= 2028 Hampshire and the Solent mayoral election =

Proposed mayoral election

- 4 May 2028
Incumbent Mayor
Did not exist

The 2028 Hampshire and the Solent mayoral election is due to be held on 4 May 2028, postponed from an originally scheduled date of 7 May 2026, to elect the first mayor of Hampshire and the Solent. It will be held at the same time as other mayoral elections in England.

== Background ==
The Isle of Wight was historically part of Hampshire. It became an administrative county in 1890, and a ceremonial county in 1974 when it gained its own Lord Lieutenant.

Previous plans in Hampshire have included a Solent Combined Authority in South Hampshire (potentially alongside the Isle of Wight) and a "Heart of Hampshire" deal including the remainder of the county. However, these plans were rejected in the south due to objections from Isle of Wight Council, and in the north of the county due to disagreements and the likelihood of the constituent authorities being reorganised.

In February 2025, the government announced that six areas had been selected to join the Devolution Priority Programme, which would include the establishment of mayoral combined authorities in each area and local government reorganisation, if necessary, to remove two-tier local government. In these areas, the councils involved were asked to submit final proposals for reorganisation at the end of September 2025. Hampshire County Council, Portsmouth and Southampton city councils, and the cabinet of the Isle of Wight Council voted in favour of bringing forward the proposal. Bournemouth, Christchurch and Poole Council considered joining Hampshire and the Solent, but ultimately voted in favour of joining Dorset, Somerset and Wiltshire in the Heart of Wessex proposal.

The formation of a mayoral combined authority for Hampshire and the Solent was agreed by the UK government in February 2025. The inaugural election was initially due to be held in May 2026, however in December 2025 the election, alongside three other new mayoral combined authorities, was delayed until 2028.

== Candidates ==
The Conservative, Green, Labour and Liberal Democrat, and Reform UK parties have all announced candidates.

=== Conservative Party ===
Donna Jones was selected in August 2025 in what was described as a "competitive process".

Name	Home Town	Experience	Announcement	Outcome of Campaign
Donna Jones	Portsmouth	Police and Crime Commissioner for Hampshire and the Isle of Wight, Former Leader of Portsmouth City Council	March 2025	Selected August 2025

=== Green Party of England and Wales ===
The Green Party of England and Wales announced that Anna Collar, who had previously stood unsuccessfully as the Green Candidate for New Forest West in the 2024 General Election, had been selected unopposed on 1 October 2025.

=== Labour Party ===
Labour announced Lorna Fielker, former Leader of Southampton City Council as their candidate on November 10.

Name	Home Town	Experience	Announcement	Outcome of Campaign
Lorna Fielker	Southampton	Former Leader of Southampton City Council	May 2025	Selected November 2025

=== Liberal Democrats ===
Martin Tod was selected in September 2025 for the Liberal Democrats.

Name	Home Town	Experience	Announcement	Outcome of Campaign
Ben Dowling (campaign website)	Portsmouth	Former Councillor, Portsmouth City Council, Currently Deputy-Ceo, Unloc	July 2025	Not selected
Jack Davies	New Forest	Councillor, New Forest District Council	May 2025	Not selected
Martin Tod (campaign website)	Winchester	Leader of Winchester City Council	July 2025	Selected September 2025

=== Reform UK ===
Rear Admiral Dr Chris Parry was announced as the Reform UK Candidate in December 2025. Reform faced calls to sack Parry over comments he made telling London-born Foreign Secretary David Lammy to "go home" to the Caribbean. He was suspended as a candidate in March 2026 after describing Jewish people as "Islamists on horseback".

=== Independent candidates ===
Several independent politicians in Hampshire and the Isle of Wight criticised the £5,000 deposit required for standing, including Paul Harvey of the Basingstoke and Deane Independents, and Kevin D'Cruze who stood as an independent parliamentary candidate in Winchester in 2024. Most Hampshire councils have independent councillors.
