= Strategic authority =

Devolved public authority in England

- Category: Foundation (2); Mayoral (7); Established mayoral (11)
- Location: England
- Number: 20
- Possible types: Combined authority (13); Combined county authority (6); Greater London Authority (1)
- Government: Board of indirectly-elected local authority councillors (6); Directly elected mayor with board of indirectly-elected councillors (13); Directly elected mayor scrutinised by the London Assembly (1)

A strategic authority is a public body introduced as part of English devolution. In December 2024, the term was applied retrospectively to refer to existing devolved public authorities in England that had been created since 2000. Strategic authorities became statutory in 2026 as part of the English Devolution and Community Empowerment Act 2026. Strategic authorities are categorised as foundation, mayoral, and established mayoral. This indicates how developed they are as structures to receive devolved powers and funding. As of June 2026, there are twenty strategic authorities made up of thirteen combined authorities, six combined county authorities and the Greater London Authority. All strategic authorities outside Greater London were voluntarily established by their constituent councils. All but foundation strategic authorities have a strategic authority mayor.

== History ==
=== Greater London Authority ===
The first strategic authority was the Greater London Authority made up of the Mayor of London and the London Assembly that was established in 2000.

=== Combined authorities and combined county authorities ===
The opportunity to create a "combined authority" was established by the Local Democracy, Economic Development and Construction Act 2009. In 2010, the Government accepted a proposal from the Association of Greater Manchester Authorities to establish a Greater Manchester Combined Authority, using the powers of the Local Democracy, Economic Development and Construction Act 2009, as an indirectly elected top-tier strategic authority for Greater Manchester. It was created on 1 April 2011. The Localism Act 2011 allowed additional transfers of powers from the Secretary of State for Communities and Local Government and gave combined authorities a general power of competence.

By 2016 combined authorities had been created covering all of the metropolitan counties which include conurbations of the largest cities outside London. (Note: These combined authorities were Liverpool City Region, North East, South Yorkshire, West Yorkshire, and the West Midlands.) In 2016 and 2017, combined authorities started to be created for smaller city regions. (Note: These combined authorities were Tees Valley, Cambridgeshire and Peterborough, and the West of England.) Any principal council can become a constituent member of a combined authority.

The Levelling-up and Regeneration Act 2023 introduced a similar type of strategic authority outside Greater London, the "combined county authority". The key difference is that these authorities must include the whole area of one or more two-tier non-metropolitan counties. They may also include unitary authorities, but two-tier non-metropolitan districts cannot be constituent members. (Note: The combined county authorities were introduced to correct a problem with earlier legislation that had enabled county and district councils to block each other from joining combined authorities.)

Since 2023 combined (county) authorities are being created for more rural areas. (Note: The combined (county) authorities created since 2023 are York and North Yorkshire, East Midlands, Devon and Torbay, Greater Lincolnshire, Hull and East Yorkshire, Lancashire, Cheshire and Warrington, Cumbria, Sussex and Brighton, and Hampshire and the Solent.)

=== English devolution act ===
In December 2024 the Starmer ministry published a white paper which proposed that the Greater London Authority, combined authorities (CAs), and combined county authorities (CCAs) would be designated as strategic authorities. These authorities would have competence over transport and local infrastructure, skills and employment support, housing and strategic planning, economic development and regeneration, environment and climate change, health, wellbeing and public service reform, and public safety. The government said it intended to "complete the map" of devolution so every part of England would be covered by one strategic authority and one principal council. (Note: Separately proposed was that the remaining parts of England with two-tier local government would be reorganised into unitary authorities)

== Categories ==
There are three categories of strategic authority in England:

Category	Description	Example	References
Foundation	Without an elected mayor. They receive basic devolved powers. (Note: There are two sub-categories of foundation strategic authority. Combined foundation strategic authorities are any combined (county) authority without a mayor and single foundation strategic authorities are a single unitary authority or county council specially designated by the government.)	Devon and Torbay Combined County Authority (Note: As of May 2026)	
Mayoral	With an elected mayor. They receive greater devolved powers.	York and North Yorkshire Combined Authority (Note: As of May 2026)	
Established mayoral	With an elected mayor in place for at least 18 months and has satisfied additional governance requirements. They receive the greatest devolved powers, notably including the Integrated Settlement, which allows more flexibility of devolved spending.	Greater Manchester Combined Authority (Note: As of May 2026)	

== Powers and functions ==
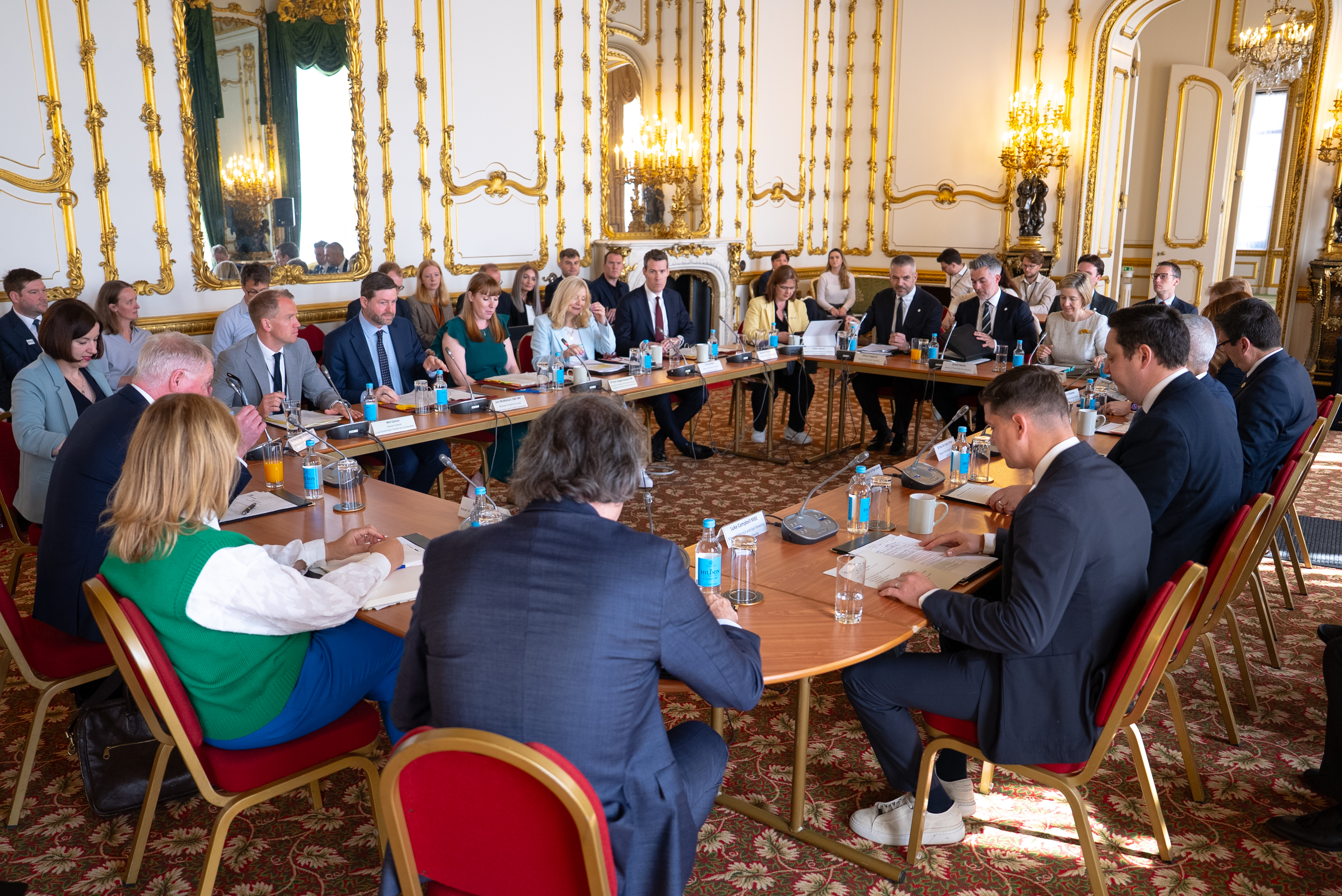
Strategic authority mayors participating in a meeting of the Mayoral Council for England, May 2025

=== Current ===
The English Devolution and Community Empowerment Act 2026 defines the competencies of strategic authorities as follows

- transport and local infrastructure, including the production of local transport plans
- skills and employment support
- housing
- strategic planning including the production of spatial development strategies
- economic development and regeneration
- the environment and climate change
- health and well-being
- public service reform
- public safety
- culture
- rural affairs and coastal communities

=== Upcoming ===
- proportion of income tax (Apr 2028)
- proportion of business rates (Apr 2027) (Note: This will replace government funding given to the strategic authorities)

== Areas ==
English strategic authority areas as of July 2026

The strategic authority areas are the geographic areas of England, made up of one or more local government area, with a strategic authority in place. These are commonly known as devolved areas, combined authority areas, areas, city regions or regions.

The Greater London strategic authority area is coterminous with the London region. Outside of Greater London, the strategic authority areas are not to be confused with the geographically larger regions of England which are statistical areas that each had a regional development agency until 2012. For example, the North East England region is covered by two strategic authority areas: North East and Tees Valley. As of June 2026, strategic authority areas cover all of northern England and some parts of the rest of England. A majority of strategic authority areas are coterminous with one or two of the ceremonial counties of England.

== List of strategic authorities ==
As of June 2026, there are twenty strategic authorities which consist of 2 foundation, 7 mayoral and 11 established:

Strategic authority						Area		
Name	Category	Type	Constituent councils	Formed	Headquarters	Name	Population (2024)	Map
Cambridgeshire and Peterborough Combined Authority	Established Mayoral (Details)	CA	Cambridge; Cambridgeshire; East Cambridgeshire; Fenland; Huntingdonshire; Peterborough; South Cambridgeshire	3 Mar 2017	Huntingdon	Cambridgeshire and Peterborough	941,740	
Cheshire and Warrington Combined Authority	Mayoral (Details)	CA	Cheshire East; Cheshire West and Chester; Warrington	24 Feb 2026	Ellesmere Port	Cheshire and Warrington	1,014,835	
Cumbria Combined Authority	Mayoral (Details)	CA	Cumberland; Westmorland and Furness	24 Feb 2026	Penrith	Cumbria	513,650	
Devon and Torbay Combined County Authority	Foundation	CCA	Devon; Torbay	5 Feb 2025	Exeter	Devon and Torbay	985,027	
East Midlands Combined County Authority	Established Mayoral (Details)	CCA	Derby; Derbyshire; Nottingham; Nottinghamshire	28 Feb 2024	Derby	East Midlands	2,290,652	
Greater Lincolnshire Combined County Authority	Mayoral (Details)	CCA	Lincolnshire; North East Lincolnshire; North Lincolnshire	5 Feb 2025	Lincoln	Greater Lincolnshire	1,125,531	
Greater London Authority	Established Mayoral (Details)	Other	—N/a	3 Jul 2000	London	Greater London	9,122,909	
Greater Manchester Combined Authority	Established Mayoral (Details)	CA	Bolton; Bury; Oldham; Manchester; Rochdale; Salford; Stockport; Tameside; Trafford; Wigan	1 Apr 2011	Manchester	Greater Manchester	3,017,590	
Hampshire and the Solent Combined County Authority	Mayoral (Details)	CCA	Hampshire; Isle of Wight; Portsmouth; Southampton	4 Jun 2026	Southampton	Hampshire and the Solent	2,063,185	
Hull and East Yorkshire Combined Authority	Mayoral (Details)	CA	East Riding of Yorkshire; Kingston upon Hull	5 Feb 2025	Hull	Hull and East Yorkshire	633,591	
Lancashire Combined County Authority	Foundation	CCA	Blackburn with Darwen; Blackpool; Lancashire	5 Feb 2025	Preston	Lancashire	1,308,567	
Liverpool City Region Combined Authority	Established Mayoral (Details)	CA	Halton; Knowsley; Liverpool; Sefton; St Helens; Wirral	1 Apr 2014	Liverpool	Liverpool City Region	1,610,919	
North East Mayoral Strategic Authority	Established Mayoral (Details)	CA	Durham; Gateshead; Newcastle upon Tyne; North Tyneside; Northumberland; South Tyneside; Sunderland	7 May 2024	Newcastle upon Tyne	North East	2,050,194	
South Yorkshire Mayoral Combined Authority	Established Mayoral (Details)	CA	Barnsley; Doncaster; Rotherham; Sheffield	1 Apr 2014	Sheffield	South Yorkshire	1,434,478	
Sussex and Brighton Strategic Authority	Mayoral (Details)	CCA	Brighton and Hove; East Sussex; West Sussex	26 Mar 2026	Chichester	Sussex and Brighton	1,767,265	
Tees Valley Combined Authority	Mayoral (Details)	CA	Darlington; Hartlepool; Stockton-on-Tees; Middlesbrough; Redcar and Cleveland	1 Apr 2016	Darlington	Tees Valley	712,552	
West Midlands Combined Authority	Established Mayoral (Details)	CA	Birmingham; Coventry; Dudley; Sandwell; Solihull; Walsall; Wolverhampton	17 Jun 2016	Birmingham	West Midlands	3,027,190	
West of England Combined Authority	Established Mayoral (Details)	CA	Bath and North East Somerset; Bristol; South Gloucestershire	9 Feb 2017	Bristol	West of England	1,004,945	
West Yorkshire Combined Authority	Established Mayoral (Details)	CA	Bradford; Calderdale; Kirklees; Leeds; Wakefield	1 Apr 2014	Leeds	West Yorkshire	2,424,324	
York and North Yorkshire Combined Authority	Established Mayoral (Details)	CA	North Yorkshire; York	20 Dec 2023	Northallerton	York and North Yorkshire	848,251	

== Partnership and cooperation ==
Where strategic authorities have mayors, they are members of the Mayoral Council for England,, the National Economic Council, and of the UK-wide Council of the Nations and Regions, both of which were established by the incoming Labour government in 2024.

=== The Great North ===
In May 2025, eight strategic authority mayors from the North of England launched a partnership known as "The Great North". The partnership comprises 11 contiguous northern strategic authorities, eight of which are currently mayoral (Greater Manchester, Hull and East Yorkshire, Liverpool City Region, North East, South Yorkshire, Tees Valley, West Yorkshire, York and North Yorkshire) and three others (Cheshire and Warrington, Cumbria, Lancashire). The partnership, whose brand is based on the Great North Run, will lead trade missions and focus on pan-North investment propositions including hosting a Northern investment summit. Transport in The Great North partnership area has been integrated under the statutory body Transport for the North since 2018.

== International relations ==
=== Representation in intergovernmental organisations ===
Some of the strategic authorities of England are represented internationally.

The mayor of London is responsible for the Greater London Authority's international relations. The London Assembly nominates one member to the Chamber of Regions of the Congress of Local and Regional Authorities. The Greater London Authority is an associate member of Eurocities and a member of the Commonwealth Local Government Forum.

Within the United Kingdom, strategic authority mayors represent their regions on the Council of Nations and Regions.

=== Missions ===
The Greater London Authority maintains a representative office in Brussels.

== See also ==
- Strategic authority mayor
- Devolution in England
- History of local government in England
- Local government in England
- Mayoral Council for England
- Corporate joint committee, a joint committee of two or more local authorities in Wales
- Strategic development planning authority, a joint committee of two or more local authorities in Scotland
- Transport Scotland#Regional transport partnerships, joint committees of two or more local authorities in Scotland
- Upcoming structural changes to local government in England
