= Wessex Mayoral Strategic Authority =

Proposed local government authority in England

- Area covered by the proposed Wessex Mayoral Strategic Authority

Type
- Type: Combined county authority

Leadership
- Mayor: TBD

Elections
- Voting system: Directly elected mayor
- Next election: 2028

The Wessex Mayoral Strategic Authority, originally proposed as the Heart of Wessex Combined Authority, is a proposed strategic authority in south-west England. The proposal is linked to the English Devolution Bill, first outlined in 2024 by the Starmer ministry. The region would have a directly elected mayor. As of October 2026, the UK Government has confirmed it plans to proceed the deal, with election of a mayor in 2028

== Background ==
In 2023, Dorset Council proposed to form a devolved authority named "Wessex" with Bournemouth, Christchurch and Poole Council (BCP), Somerset Council, North Somerset Council and Wiltshire Council. The name comes from the Anglo-Saxon kingdom.

== Proposed composition ==
In January 2025, following a vote by Wiltshire Council, the leaders of Dorset, Somerset and Wiltshire councils said they had written to the UK government to show support for devolution of powers to the proposed combined authority. This was despite reservations among Wiltshire councillors who felt that a mayor was "not right for a large rural area". The three leaders said they remained open to discussions with BCP, Swindon Borough Council and North Somerset Council.

In the same month, BCP councillors voted in favour of joining the three largely rural counties, rather than supporting the Hampshire and Solent proposal involving Hampshire, Southampton, Portsmouth and the Isle of Wight. Council leader Millie Earl described it as the "best option".

In reaction to the confirmation of the strategic authority, Mid Dorset and North Poole MP Vikki Slade revealed that a foundation authority had been considered by the government instead, covering only the Dorset Council and BCP Council areas.

== Reception ==
In December 2024, Vikki Slade MP compared a proposed Wessex mayor to the Thomas Hardy character Jude the Obscure from his Wessex fictional literary landscape.

In February 2025, Deputy Prime Minister and Secretary of State for Housing, Communities and Local Government Angela Rayner halted the devolution deal, with the Ministry of Housing, Communities and Local Government explaining that Wessex did not meet the criteria set out in the English Devolution White Paper on readiness or geography. As a result the proposed Heart of Wessex Combined Authority was not included in the Devolution Priority Programme.

In July 2026, Dorset Council leader Nick Ireland wrote to then incoming Prime Minister Andy Burnham, urging him to expedite the approval for the devolution deal, citing disappointment at losing out on funding. Then in August the Burnham ministry invited areas without a devolution settlement to "express an interest in establishing a Mayoral Strategic Authority".

In the Autumn Budget for 2026, the government confirmed it would be proceeding with the Wessex Strategic Authority, with the election of a mayor set for 2028.

== See also ==
- Devolution in the United Kingdom § England
