= Combined authorities and combined county authorities =

Devolved public authorities in England

Combined Authorities Combined County Authorities
- Location: England
- Number: 19
- Possible types: Combined authority (13); Combined county authority (6)
- Government: Board of indirectly-elected local authority councillors (6); Directly elected mayor with board of indirectly-elected councillors (13)

A combined authority (CA) and a county combined authority (CCA) are two types of strategic authority introduced in England outside Greater London.

As of 5 June 2026, there are 13 CAs and six CCAs, predominantly in areas where they are considered likely to improve transport, economic development, and regeneration. Together with the Greater London Authority, these are known as strategic authorities since 2026. 11 CAs and two CCAs are led by a directly-elected mayor. Strategic authority mayors sit on the Mayoral Council for England.

The first CA to be established was the Greater Manchester Combined Authority in 2011, and since 2022 the UK government has increased its support for the creation of CAs and CCAs. The most recently created, as of 4 June 2026, is the Hampshire and the Solent Combined County Authority.

== History ==
Following the abolition of metropolitan county councils and the Greater London Council in 1986, England had no local or regional government bodies with strategic authority over the major urban areas of the country. In 1999, following a successful referendum, the Labour government created a strategic regional authority for Greater London, but no bodies were established to replace the abolished metropolitan county councils. The Blair government instead pursued the idea of elected regional assemblies for the other eight Government Office Regions. Following an unsuccessful referendum in 2004 in the North East region, the idea of establishing elected regional assemblies outside of Greater London had few proponents.

In 2010, the Government accepted a proposal from the Association of Greater Manchester Authorities to establish a Greater Manchester Combined Authority, using the powers of the Local Democracy, Economic Development and Construction Act 2009, as an indirectly elected top-tier strategic authority for Greater Manchester.

In October 2010 the Coalition Government introduced measures to replace regional development agencies, which were described as inefficient and costly. They were superseded by local enterprise partnerships, voluntary groups whose membership was drawn from the private sector with local authority input.

Following the unsuccessful English mayoral referendums in 2012, CAs and (since 2023) CCAs have been used as an alternative means to grant additional powers and funding as part of City Deals.

In 2014, two indirectly elected CAs were established covering the metropolitan county areas of South Yorkshire and West Yorkshire, and a further two which each covered a metropolitan county and adjacent non-metropolitan districts: the Liverpool City Region CA and the North East CA (2014–2024). The Liverpool City Region Combined Authority covers Merseyside and the Borough of Halton unitary authority. The North East Combined Authority (2014–2024) initially covered all of Tyne and Wear and the unitary authorities of County Durham and Northumberland, but was reconstituted in 2018 to cover only the authorities south of the River Tyne (County Durham, Gateshead, South Tyneside, and Sunderland). The North of Tyne Combined Authority was formed (with a mayor) in 2018 to cover the authorities north of the River Tyne (Newcastle upon Tyne, North Tyneside, and Northumberland).

In 2016, a CA was formed for the West Midlands; as a consequence, all metropolitan counties are now covered by a CA. In 2016, the first CA to only cover non-metropolitan areas was formed. This was Tees Valley Combined Authority, which covers the area of the former county of Cleveland (now four unitary authorities in the ceremonial counties of Durham and North Yorkshire), together with the unitary authority of Darlington. Two further CAs in non-metropolitan areas were formed in 2017: West of England (comprising Bristol and two of the three adjacent unitary authorities in Gloucestershire and Somerset, all of which had been within the former county of Avon) and Cambridgeshire and Peterborough (comprising the ceremonial county of Cambridgeshire).

In 2019 a single Yorkshire CA, dubbed "One Yorkshire", was proposed. The proposal had support from 18 of the 20 Yorkshire councils. Sheffield and Rotherham both preferred the South Yorkshire alternative while the Mayor of South Yorkshire, Dan Jarvis, also supported a One Yorkshire proposal.

In 2020, it was reported that CAs for more non-metropolitan parts of the country – such as Cumbria, Lancashire, North Yorkshire, and Somerset – were under consideration, but the effect of the coronavirus pandemic on governance meant decisions were delayed until late 2021.

=== 2022 ===
A government white paper published in February 2022 contained invitations for nine areas to go into devolution deal negotiations:

Invited council groups	Developments
Cornwall	Deal agreed in 2023
Derbyshire and Derby	Formed East Midlands Combined County Authority
Nottinghamshire and Nottingham	Formed East Midlands Combined County Authority
Devon, Plymouth and Torbay	Devon and Torbay deal agreed in September 2024, Plymouth deal yet to be agreed
Durham	Formed North East Mayoral Strategic Authority with Northumberland and Tyne-and-Wear councils
Hull and East Yorkshire	Deal agreed in September 2024
Leicestershire	Deal yet to be agreed
Norfolk	Norfolk and Suffolk deal agreed in February 2025
Suffolk	Norfolk and Suffolk deal agreed in February 2025

=== 2023–24 (Sunak ministry) ===
The Chancellor of the Exchequer, Jeremy Hunt, announced in his 2023 budget speech that "trailblazer deals" had been struck with Greater Manchester Combined Authority and West Midlands Combined Authority which included reforms to their funding models. As part of these deals, these two CAs will be treated in a similar manner to government departments at the next spending review and each will be allocated a multi-year single settlement, replacing a large number of individual grant funding streams for which they must submit individual competitive bids.

After the Levelling-up and Regeneration Act 2023 was passed, there was an influx of new CAs and CCAs either being created or planned to be created, and further powers to be devolved to existing authorities, starting with the establishment of the York and North Yorkshire Combined Authority, the East Midlands Combined County Authority, and the North East Mayoral Combined Authority. The latter superseded and replaced both the North East Combined Authority (2014–2024) and the North of Tyne Combined Authority.

In his 2024 budget, Hunt said that soon to be established North East mayoral CA would have its own trailblazer deal. In return, CAs and CCAs would face greater oversight, including quarterly scrutiny sessions by new committees of local MPs.

=== 2024–26 (Starmer ministry) ===
In December 2024 the Starmer ministry published a white paper which is expected to lead to the creation of further CAs and CCAs. This led to the English Devolution and Community Empowerment Act 2026 which enables CAs, CCAs, and the Greater London Authority to all be designated as strategic authorities. These authorities would have competence over transport and local infrastructure, skills and employment support, housing and strategic planning, economic development and regeneration, environment and climate change, health, wellbeing and public service reform, and public safety. It is expected that eventually strategic authorities will cover the whole of England. As a first step to this goal, four further CAs and CCAs were established in February 2025.

==== Devon and Torbay ====
- Devon; Torbay

In early 2022, Devon, Plymouth and Torbay was selected as one of nine pilot areas in England by the UK government in the Levelling Up White Paper for "County Deal" negotiations. However, Plymouth City Council decided to withdraw from the deal in November 2023. Devon and Torbay proceeded without Plymouth with a joint proposal for a Level 2 Devolution Deal, a CCA without a directly elected mayor. The deal was approved by both Devon County Council and Torbay Council and submitted to the Secretary of State for approval in early May 2024. The Devon and Torbay Combined County Authority was formally approved in September 2024. There are provisions to expand the membership should Plymouth City Council join this CCA in the future, and in February 2025 Plymouth, Devon and Torbay Councils agreed to explore the creation of a mayoral CCA, which would supersede the non-mayoral CCA.

==== Hull and East Yorkshire ====
- East Riding of Yorkshire; Kingston upon Hull

After the government rejected the One Yorkshire proposal in 2019 and a cross-Humber deal with North Lincolnshire failed, a Hull and East Riding alternative was proposed. Negotiations began with government on a deal, with leaders of both unitary authorities indicating a preference for a rotating chair instead of a mayor. This deal and Greater Lincolnshire includes the last councils of Yorkshire and the Humber to not have a CA or CCA. A mayoral deal was approved in September 2024.

==== Lancashire ====
- Blackburn with Darwen; Blackpool; Lancashire

A proposal for Lancashire failed in 2017. Council leaders agreed to the concept in June 2020, with suggestions of reducing the number of districts into three unitary authorities, or implementing a single unitary authority instead of a CCA. The three proposed successor authorities would have covered the northern and coastal, central and southern, and eastern and Pennine areas. A non-mayoral county deal was approved in September 2024.

==== Greater Lincolnshire ====
- Lincolnshire; North East Lincolnshire; North Lincolnshire

A plan for Lincolnshire devolution, which would have included all constituent boroughs as well as the county council, failed in 2016 after constituent councils voted against it. There were subsequently discussions of an East Midlands devolution deal. A new Greater Lincolnshire devolution deal was announced on 13 November 2023 with the agreement of Lincolnshire County Council, North East Lincolnshire and North Lincolnshire with a directly elected mayor without the involvement of any the constituent boroughs. The deal proposed to devolve certain powers, i.e. housing, transport, education and skills as well as environmental matters to Greater Lincolnshire CCA. The consultation by the constituent councils received significant support in favour of the CCA. The three local authorities following public consultations formally agreed to the deal in March 2024. Following the outcome of the 2024 general election, the new Labour government agreed to proceed with the devolution deal on 21 September 2024. Draft statutory instruments to establish the CCA were laid before parliament on 26 November 2024.

==== Cheshire and Warrington ====
- Cheshire East; Cheshire West and Chester, Warrington

==== Cumbria ====
- Cumberland; Westmorland and Furness

==== Sussex and Brighton ====
- Brighton and Hove; East Sussex; West Sussex

==== Hampshire and the Solent ====
- Hampshire; Isle of Wight; Portsmouth; Southampton

Proposals in 2016 included a Solent CA in South Hampshire (potentially alongside the Isle of Wight) and a "Heart of Hampshire" deal for the remainder of the county. These plans were rejected in the south due to objections from Isle of Wight Council, and in the north of the county due to disagreements and the likelihood of the constituent authorities being reorganised. A Dorset CA was proposed by the county's former nine constituent councils, and was considered by the two unitary councils (Dorset and Bournemouth, Christchurch and Poole) which replaced them in April 2019. In 2021 a new plan including Hampshire, Isle of Wight, and Bournemouth, Christchurch and Poole was being pursued, though lacking appetite for a mayor. In 2024 a plan was put forward for an elected mayor and a CCA including Hampshire, the Isle of Wight, Portsmouth and Southampton; Bournemouth, Christchurch and Poole Council opted not to participate, instead favouring joining Dorset, Somerset and Wiltshire in the Heart of Wessex proposal.

== Legislation ==
The Local Democracy, Economic Development and Construction Act 2009 allowed for certain functions over transport to be transferred from central government to a new type of devolved public authority called a CA. The Localism Act 2011 allowed additional transfers of powers from the Secretary of State for Communities and Local Government and gave CAs a general power of competence. The powers and functions to be shared are agreed by the metropolitan district, non-metropolitan district or non-metropolitan county councils covered by the CA (both two-tier councils and unitary councils).

In 2014, the government consulted on changes to the legislation governing CAs. Proposed changes included extending the legislation to Greater London, Wales, and Scotland. The Cities and Local Government Devolution Act 2016 received royal assent on 28 January 2016. The act allowed for the introduction of directly elected mayors to CAs in England and Wales with powers over housing, transport, planning, and policing.

In 2020, the government planned to produce a white paper on 'Devolution and Local Recovery', which was expected to propose a new type of devolved public authority with a mayor – or "county mayors" – for non-metropolitan areas of the country. These have been tentatively suggested to be a 'Great South West' grouping of Cornwall, Devon, and Dorset (possibly with Somerset), and another in Lancashire. The white paper was delayed and was eventually published on 2 February 2022.

The Levelling-up and Regeneration Act 2023 enhanced devolution and created an alternative type of devolved public authority called a CCA. The act allowed for a broader range of functions to be devolved to new and existing CAs and CCAs, and created the power for CAs and CCAs to be allowed to change the title of their mayor.

=== Creation and amendment ===
CAs and CCAs both consist of two or more contiguous English principal areas outside Greater London. A local authority may only belong to one CA or CCA.

The creation of a CA is voluntary and all principal councils within the area must give their consent before it can be created. Any English principal council outside Greater London can join a CA, and a county council can become part of a CA even if only some of the non-metropolitan districts that make up the county are within the CA area.

There are three stages to the creation or amendment of a CA. Firstly a review must be undertaken to establish the likelihood that a CA would improve:

"...the exercise of statutory functions relating to transport in the area, the effectiveness and efficiency of transport in the area, the exercise of statutory functions relating to economic development and regeneration in the area, and economic conditions in the area."

— Local Democracy, Economic Development and Construction Act 2009, Part 6

On completion of the review, the local authorities produce and publish a proposed scheme of the proposed CA, including the area that will be covered, the constitution, and the functions. This will include details of membership of the CA, remuneration, and how meetings will be chaired and recorded. Following a period of consultation and subject to the approval of the Secretary of State for Communities and Local Government, the CA is formally created, dissolved, or altered by a statutory instrument.

CCAs can only be formed by "upper-tier" principal areas: county councils and unitary authorities. A CCA may have additional non‑constituent or associate members and allow another body to nominate such members; these additional members are non-voting unless decided otherwise. Non‑constituent members can include representatives of the CCA area’s two-tier non-metropolitan districts. The process for creating or amending a CCA is significantly different to the three stage process required for CAs. CCAs are formally created, dissolved, or altered by a statutory instrument regulation made by the Secretary of State.

== Types ==
Combined authorities were introduced by the Local Democracy, Economic Development and Construction Act 2009. CAs are created voluntarily and allow a group of principal area local authorities to pool appropriate responsibility and receive certain devolved powers from central government, creating a form of regional or sub-regional government able to deliver government functions (including transport and economic development) more effectively. In areas where local government is two-tier, all principal councils can be members of the CA.

Combined county authorities were introduced by the Levelling-up and Regeneration Act 2023. CCAs must include the whole area of one or more two-tier non-metropolitan counties. They may also include unitary authorities, but two-tier non-metropolitan districts cannot be members of a CCA.

== List of combined authorities and combined county authorities ==
=== Existing authorities ===
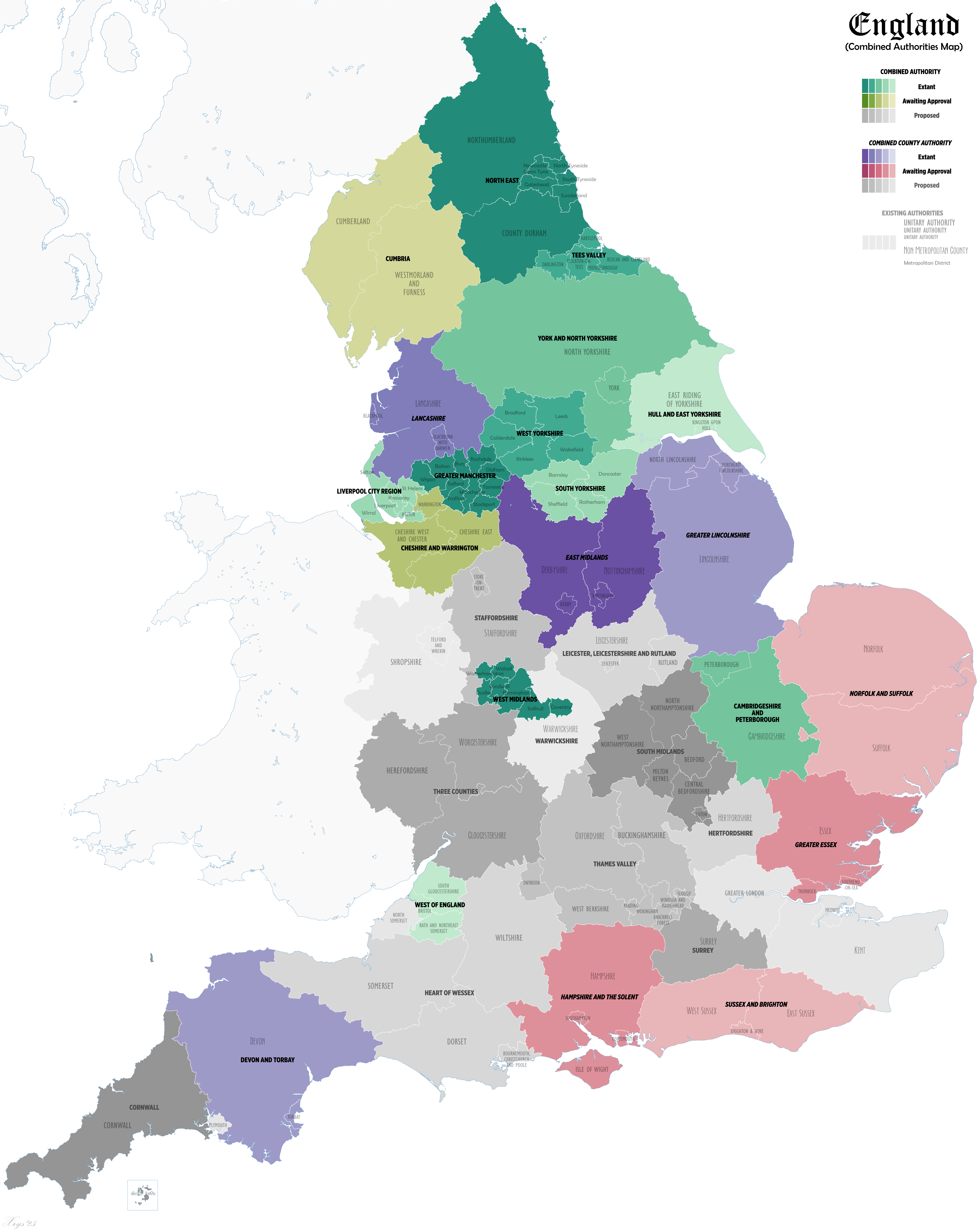
Combined authorities and combined county authorities as of August 2025

As of June 2026, there are 19 combined authorities and combined county authorities in England.

=== Upcoming combined authorities and combined county authorities ===
Six mayoral deals were approved by the UK government in February 2025, with mayors expected to be elected in May 2027 or May 2028: As of 5 June 2026, CAs or CCAs have been established for four of these areas, while the following two remain in development:

Authority	Type	Constituent councils	Composition
Greater Essex	CCA	Essex; Thurrock; Southend-on-Sea	One two-tier county and two unitary authorities
Norfolk and Suffolk	CCA	Norfolk; Suffolk	Two two-tier counties

==== Greater Essex ====
A proposed devolution deal was narrowly voted against in 2016, but re-emerged in 2020. A separate deal was also proposed for a "South Essex" CA, covering Southend, Thurrock, Basildon, Castle Point, Brentwood, and Rochford. The whole Essex plan also suggested forming four new unitary authorities, whilst the South Essex plan favoured retaining the current status. The Minister for Regional Growth and Local Government stated in a letter that he did not favour the plan for a South Essex CA, but would be willing to discuss it.

==== Norfolk and Suffolk ====
The original proposal was for a Norfolk and Suffolk CA, before it was replaced with an East Anglia proposal including Cambridgeshire and Peterborough. The East Anglia plan failed, reverting to the original two plans. Whilst the Cambridgeshire and Peterborough plan succeeded, the Norfolk and Suffolk plan failed, with King's Lynn and West Norfolk Borough Council voting to reject the deal, and Norfolk County Council cancelling a subsequent planned meeting on the topic. Attention then moved to separate single-county deals for Norfolk and Suffolk individually.

Norfolk's District and County Councils previously disagreed over the election of a mayor. The government and the county council signed a devolution agreement on 8 December 2022, which included the creation of an elected mayor with the title Elected Leader. Subject to consultation, and council and parliamentary approval, it was hoped that the first Elected Leader would have been elected in 2024 to coincide with the police and crime commissioner elections.

Suffolk County Council's plans for a county-wide deal were supported by the constituent district councils with backing from its local MPs, although opposing a mayoral deal. Suffolk County Council signed a devolution agreement with the Department for Levelling up, Housing and Communities in December 2022, which included an Elected Leader who would have led the County Council.

In September 2024, following the 2024 United Kingdom general election, the new Labour government decided against pursuing single authority devolution deals, instead preferring the formation of multi-authority CAs or CCAs. Thus plans for Elected Leaders in Norfolk and Suffolk were dropped. A joint Norfolk and Suffolk mayoral CCA was instead proposed in November 2024 alongside a reorganisation of the existing two-tier local government structures in to a smaller number of unitary authorities.

=== Former combined authorities and combined county authorities ===
Authority	Type	Constituent councils	Formed	Dissolved	Headquarters	Population (2020)	Replaced by
North of Tyne	CA (mayoral)	Newcastle upon Tyne; North Tyneside; Northumberland	2 November 2018	7 May 2024	Newcastle upon Tyne	839,500	North East Mayoral Combined Authority
North East (2014–2024)	CA (non-mayoral)	County Durham; Gateshead; South Tyneside; Sunderland	15 April 2014	7 May 2024	South Shields	1,164,100	North East Mayoral Combined Authority

== Proposals for remaining areas of England ==
=== Cornwall ===
- Cornwall

Cornwall remains in negotiations for a separate deal. Plymouth, having withdrawn from the Devon and Torbay deal in November 2023, has three options: join negotiations with Cornwall; negotiate a deal with Cornwall, Devon and Torbay or rejoin Devon and Torbay.

In July 2026, Cornwall Council decided to become a Foundation Strategic Authority in its own right, without forming a combined authority with another local authority.

=== Leicester, Leicestershire and Rutland ===
- Leicestershire; Leicester; Rutland

Leicestershire County Council proposed a CA in 2015, with discussions after including an East Midlands deal. A Leicestershire deal has also been proposed by government but without Leicester; as the whitepaper stipulates a minimum population of 500,000, Leicester or Rutland would not be able to form individual devolution deals; both Leicester and Rutland have been proposed as joining part of a deal. Rutland is open to joining a Leicestershire deal, once being a district of Leicestershire between 1974 and 1997 before becoming a unitary authority.

=== Mayoral deals ===
Short-name	Authority areas	Composition
Heart of Wessex	Bournemouth, Christchurch and Poole; Dorset; Somerset; Wiltshire	Four unitary authorities
South Midlands	Bedford; Central Bedfordshire; Luton; Milton Keynes; North Northamptonshire; West Northamptonshire	Six unitary authorities
Thames Valley	Bracknell Forest; Buckinghamshire; Oxfordshire; Reading; Slough; Swindon; West Berkshire; Windsor and Maidenhead; Wokingham	One two-tier county and 8 unitary authorities
Three Counties	Gloucestershire; Herefordshire; Worcestershire	Two two-tier counties and one unitary authority

Bedfordshire councils, Milton Keynes and Northamptonshire councils are in negotiations with a second possibility excluding Northamptonshire councils. The deal is known as South Midlands.

The Three Counties (of Gloucestershire, Herefordshire and Worcestershire) share an agricultural heritage and Hereford and Worcester was a county from 1974 until 1996.

==== Wessex ====
- Dorset; Somerset; Wiltshire

Dorset Council, Somerset Council and Wiltshire Council submitted an expression of interest in September 2024 to form a Wessex combined authority. In November 2024, all three authorities committed to the establishment of a mayoral CA, and stated that an offer to include Bournemouth, Christchurch and Poole Council (later accepting the offer) and Swindon Borough Council remained open.

==== Surrey ====
- East Surrey, West Surrey

Surrey County Council sought a mayoral combined authority for the area of Surrey, and therefore sought structural changes to replace itself with unitary councils.

In July 2026, the East Surrey Council discussed plans developed by the Ministry for Housing, Communities and Local Government for a Surrey Combined Authority.

==== Thames Valley ====
- Bracknell Forest; Buckinghamshire; Oxfordshire; Reading; Slough; Swindon; West Berkshire; Windsor and Maidenhead; Wokingham

The proposed area covers almost the same area as the Thames Valley Police does; the force was created in 1968. Oxfordshire acquired large areas of Berkshire in the 1970s, creating a further shared connection between two of the counties. Milton Keynes is in negotiations for the South Midlands deal and (after voting between Wessex and the Thames Valley) Swindon replaced Milton Keynes in the deal.

Berkshire County Council was abolished in 1998, leaving the districts as unitary authorities. In 2021 the constituent districts agreed to submit an expression of interest in a county deal. The six unitary councils formed a joint Berkshire Prosperity Board in February 2024 and submitted an expression of interest in forming a non-mayoral CA in September 2024.

If the Thames Valley deal fails, Buckinghamshire Council plan to be part of a county deal, without a mayor.

=== County deals ===
Short-name	Authority areas
Hertfordshire	Hertfordshire
Staffordshire	Staffordshire; Stoke-on-Trent
Surrey	Surrey
Warwickshire	Warwickshire

Hertfordshire districts have given support for a deal, but was not included in the 2022 white paper.

A leadership board has been formed by Staffordshire County Council; and its constituent districts, with an invitation to unitary Stoke-on-Trent. There is some interest in devolution talks, but requiring Stoke-on-Trent's participation.

For Surrey and Warwickshire, discussions are ongoing between local authorities and the government on respective eventual deals.

== See also ==
- Devolution in the United Kingdom
- Greater London Authority (which operates under different legislation)
- History of local government in England
- Local government in England
- Regions of England
- Local enterprise partnership
- Corporate Joint Committee, similar non-mayoral strategic authorities in Wales
- Mayoral Council for England
