= Heart of Wessex =

Heart of Wessex could refer to

- Heart of Wessex Combined Authority, an upcoming local authority
- Heart of Wessex Line, a railway line
