= Residuary Body for Wales =

Public body of Wales

Residuary Body for Wales Corff Gweddilliol Cymru
- Predecessor: Counties of Wales
- Successor: Principal areas of Wales
- Formation: 1995
- Founder: Local Government (Wales) Act 1994
- Dissolved: 1998
- Region served: Wales

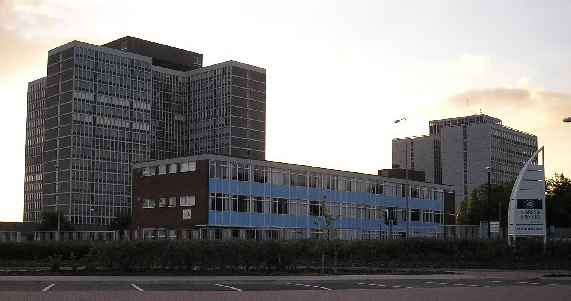
Body's Headquarters (on the left)

Residuary Body for Wales (Welsh: Corff Gweddilliol Cymru) was a non-departmental public body.

== History ==
The Residuary Body for Wales was established by Local Government (Wales) Act 1994, taking up its duties on 1 February 1995. It was formed primarily to give advice to the Secretary of State for Wales, in respect of the transfer of property, rights and liabilities and related functions from an abolished authority either to a new Principal Council or other public body or the Residuary Body. From 1 April 1996, the Body's role changed, to the management and disposal of any transferred properties.

The Body was abolished in 1998 under Government of Wales Act 1998. Its functions, property rights and liabilities were transferred to various Welsh principal areas.
