= Unitary authorities of England =

Local government in some parts of England

Unitary authority area
- Areas of England with a unitary authority system of local government as of 2026 (red)
- Category: Local government in England
- Location: England
- Found in: Strategic authority areas (some)
- Number: 132 (as of 2026)
- Possible types: London borough (32); Metropolitan district (36); Coterminous non-metropolitan district and non-metropolitan county (56); Non-metropolitan district in Berkshire (6); City of London Corporation (1); Council of the Isles of Scilly (1)
- Possible status: City; Royal borough; Borough
- Populations: 2,299–1,176,960

In England, a unitary authority or unitary council is a type of local authority that performs all local government functions, which is used in 132 of the districts of England.

The unitary authority system replaces the previous two-tier system of local government which was used near-universally across England from 1974 to 1986, in which local government responsibilities are shared between county councils and district councils. The two-tier system of local government has been replaced with the unitary system gradually over time, with the remaining two-tier areas proposed to be replaced by unitary authorities as part of the upcoming changes to local government.

The districts which are under the jurisdiction of a unitary authority are also referred to as "unitary authority areas" or "unitary areas". The terms "unitary district" and, for those which are coterminous with a former two-tier county council area, "unitary county" are also sometimes used. The term unitary authority is also sometimes used to refer to the area governed, such as in the ISO 3166-2:GB standard defining a taxonomy for subdivisions of the UK, and in colloquial usage.

== Types ==
All unitary authorities carry out all local government functions in the district in question, but they have different legal definitions depending on the law by which they were created.

=== London boroughs and metropolitan boroughs ===
The London boroughs, created in 1965, and metropolitan districts, created in 1974, originally had two-tier local government, and became unitary authorities in 1986 following the abolition of the Greater London Council and metropolitan county councils.

=== City of London and Isles of Scilly ===
The City of London and the Isles of Scilly, each having a unique form of local governance, have always been single-tier. The Council of the Isles of Scilly is a sui generis authority created in 1890, and since 1930 has held the "powers, duties and liabilities" of a county council. The City of London Corporation is also a sui generis local authority with similar functions to a London borough council.

=== Non-metropolitan districts ===
In the rest of England outside of the London boroughs, metropolitan boroughs, City of London, and Isles of Scilly, unitary authorities are constituted under the Local Government Act 1992. This act amended the Local Government Act 1972 to allow the existence of non-metropolitan counties that consist of a single non-metropolitan district, thereby giving a unitary form of government. Most of the unitary non-metropolitan districts were established during the 1990s, with more created in 2009 and 2019–23.

These are usually constituted as a coterminous non-metropolitan district and non-metropolitan county. In Berkshire, they are constituted as non-metropolitan districts in the Royal county of Berkshire, with Berkshire retaining its status as a non-metropolitan county despite having no role in government after the abolition of Berkshire County Council.

The size of the areas governed by the unitary non-metropolitan districts varies greatly. The authorities created in the 1990s are generally coterminous with one former two-tier district area and cover a single large town or city, while those created since 2009 generally cover larger areas, with some coterminous with an entire former two-tier county council area.

== History ==
=== Background ===
The term "unitary authority" was first used in the Redcliffe-Maud Report in 1969 in its current sense of a local government authority which combines the functions of a county council and a district council. Strictly speaking, the term does not necessarily mean a single level of local government within an area, because in some cases there are also parish councils in the same area.

Although the term was not applied to them, county boroughs between 1889 and 1974 were effectively unitary authority areas, that is, single-tier administrative units. Before 1889, local government authorities had different powers and functions, but from medieval times some cities and towns had a high degree of autonomy as counties corporate. Some smaller settlements also enjoyed some degree of autonomy from regular administration as boroughs or liberties.

The Local Government Act 1972 created areas for local government where large towns and their rural hinterlands were administered together. The concept of unitary units was abandoned with a two-tier arrangement of county and district councils enacted in all areas of England from 1974, except the Isles of Scilly where the small size and distance from the mainland made it impractical.

=== 1986 reform ===
The Local Government Act 1985 brought about the abolition the six metropolitan counties and Greater London in 1986, with their functions being split between central government, the borough councils and joint boards. The London boroughs and metropolitan boroughs thereby became unitary authorities, marking the first step away from the two-tier system introduced across England in 1974.

=== 1990s reform ===
A review in the 1990s was initiated to select non-metropolitan areas where new unitary authorities could be created. The resulting structural changes were implemented between 1995 and 1998. Bristol, Herefordshire, the Isle of Wight and Rutland were established as counties of a single district; the county administration of Berkshire was dissolved, though the county legally preserved to retain for its territory its royal designation, and each of its district councils became unitary; the counties of Avon, Humberside and Cleveland were broken up to create several unitary authorities; and a number of districts were split off from their associated counties. The changes caused the ceremonial counties to be defined separately, as they had been before 1974. The review caused 46 unitary authorities to be created.

=== 2009 changes ===
A further review was initiated in 2007 and was enacted in 2009. The review established Cornwall and Northumberland as counties of a single district; established unitary authorities in County Durham, Shropshire and Wiltshire covering the part of the county that was not already split off in the 1990s review; and divided the remainder of Bedfordshire and Cheshire into two unitary authority areas. The review caused nine unitary authorities to be created.

=== 2019−2023 changes ===
In 2017, it was proposed that two unitary authority areas be formed to cover the ceremonial county of Dorset. One of the authorities would consist of the existing unitary authorities of Bournemouth, Poole and the two-tier district of Christchurch, the other would be composed of the remainder of the county. In November 2017, Secretary of State for Communities and Local Government, Sajid Javid stated that he was "minded to approve the proposals" and a final decision to implement the two unitary authority model was confirmed in February 2018. Statutory instruments for the creation of two unitary authorities, to be named Bournemouth, Christchurch and Poole Council and Dorset Council, have been made and shadow authorities for the new council areas were formed ahead of their creation on 1 April 2019.

Buckinghamshire County Council and the two-tier districts of Aylesbury Vale, Chiltern, South Bucks, and Wycombe in Buckinghamshire were replaced by a single unitary authority known as Buckinghamshire Council on 1 April 2020. The existing unitary authority of Milton Keynes was not affected; from 1 April 2020, therefore, the ceremonial county of Buckinghamshire has been composed of two unitary authority areas.

Following the declaration of insolvency by Northamptonshire County Council in early 2018, government-appointed commissioners took over control of the council's affairs. A March 2018 independent report commissioned by the Secretary of State for Housing, Communities and Local Government proposed to abolish the existing county council and district councils and to create two new unitary authorities in their place. One authority, West Northamptonshire, would consist of the existing districts of Daventry, Northampton and South Northamptonshire and the other authority, North Northamptonshire would consist of Corby, East Northamptonshire, Kettering and Wellingborough districts. This was confirmed in May 2019, with the new councils being created in April 2021.

In July 2021 the Ministry of Housing, Communities and Local Government announced that in April 2023, the non-metropolitan counties of Cumbria, North Yorkshire and Somerset would be reorganised into unitary authority areas. The new authorities, Cumberland, Westmorland and Furness, North Yorkshire Council and Somerset Council were first elected in May 2022 and formally assumed their powers on 1 April 2023.

=== English Devolution Bill ===
The Labour Party returned to power following the 2024 general election, and in her Autumn budget statement, Chancellor of the Exchequer Rachel Reeves outlined that a forthcoming English Devolution Bill would include plans for "working with councils to move to simpler structures that make sense for their local areas", suggesting that a new round of local government reorganisation could be likely.

In February 2025 Jim McMahon, the Minister for Local Government and English Devolution, wrote to all two-tier and unitary councils in England stating that all local government will move to a unitary system with new council areas having a target population of at least 500,000. Councils were invited to work together and submit an interim plan by 21 March 2025 and a final proposal for reorganisation by 28 November 2025. Local elections in East Sussex, West Sussex, Essex, Thurrock, Hampshire, the Isle of Wight, Norfolk, Suffolk and Surrey were delayed in May 2025, to accommodate local reorganisation.

== Restructuring ==
The process of changing from a two-tier local government to a structure based on unitary authorities is called 'restructuring'. The Secretary of State responsible for local government invites proposals from local areas to restructure into unitary authorities, and the Secretary decides whether or not the change should be implemented. The restructuring is carried out by an Order. There are no examples in the UK of councils restructuring back into a two-tier system.

=== Criticism ===
Unitary government has been criticised for damaging local democracy. Opponents to unitary authority criticise the 'bigger is better' assumption and highlight that larger councils breed mistrust of councillors and reduction in public engagement and voter turnout. Outside the UK, multi-level local government is the prevailing system, with major towns normally having a local authority. The average size of a local authority in England is 170,000, three times that of Europe.

== Comparison ==
Unitary authorities combine the powers and functions that are delivered separately by the councils with two-tier governance. These functions are housing, waste management, waste collection, council tax collection, education, libraries, social services, transport, planning, consumer protection, licensing, cemeteries and crematoria. The breakdown of these services is as follows:

Service	Two-tier		Unitary authority
Service	Non-metropolitan county	Non-metropolitan district	Unitary authority
Education	Yes	No	Yes
Transport	Yes	No	Yes
Housing	No	Yes	Yes
Planning	Yes (Note: Planning authority for minerals, waste and county council developments)	Yes	Yes
Planning applications	No	Yes	Yes
Fire and public safety	Yes	No	Yes
Social care	Yes	No	Yes
Libraries	Yes	No	Yes
Waste management	Yes	No	Yes
Rubbish collection	No	Yes	Yes
Recycling	No	Yes	Yes
Trading standards	Yes	No	Yes
Council Tax collections	No	Yes	Yes

== Electoral arrangements ==
Electoral arrangements for unitary authorities are set-out within the act of Parliament or statutory instrument establishing the authority. Most unitary authorities in England are divided into a number of wards from which councillors are elected.

Eight unitary authorities are instead divided into electoral divisions: Cornwall, County Durham, Isle of Wight, North Yorkshire, Northumberland, Shropshire, Somerset, and Wiltshire – legally, these are continuing county councils gaining district council functions. Buckinghamshire and Dorset unitary authorities were, however, established as new councils and divided into wards.

== List of unitary authorities ==
Unitary authorities are usually named after a town, city, geographical area or county (historic and or ceremonial). With no effect on powers or functions, districts can be granted the status of royal borough, borough or city. A district having a charter is dependent on the charter's wording: as a charter trustee to a place in the district; having joint charter to the place and district or to the district itself.

As of June 2026, there are 132 unitary authorities in England.

Unitary authority area	Council	Land area		Population (2024)	Density		Created	Type	Ceremonial county	Strategic authority
Unitary authority area	Council	(km^{2})	(mi^{2})	Population (2024)	(/km^{2})	(/mi^{2})	Created	Type	Ceremonial county	Strategic authority
Barking and Dagenham	Barking and Dagenham London Borough Council	36	14	238,295	6,601	17,100	1965	Borough, London Borough	Greater London	GLA
Barnet	Barnet London Borough Council	87	34	408,087	4,703	12,180	1965	Borough, London Borough	Greater London	GLA
Barnsley	Barnsley Metropolitan Borough Council	329	127	252,784	768	1,990	1974	Borough, Metropolitan district	South Yorkshire	South Yorkshire Mayoral Combined Authority
Bath and North East Somerset	Bath and North East Somerset Council	346	134	200,898	581	1,500	1996	Non-metropolitan district, Non-metropolitan county	Somerset	West of England CA
Bedford	Bedford Borough Council	476	184	196,398	412	1,070	2009	Borough, Non-metropolitan district, Non-metropolitan county	Bedfordshire	None
Bexley	Bexley London Borough Council	61	24	257,103	4,245	10,990	1965	Borough, London Borough	Greater London	GLA
Birmingham	Birmingham City Council	268	103	1,176,960	4,395	11,380	1974	City, Borough, Metropolitan district	West Midlands	West Midlands CA
Blackburn with Darwen	Blackburn with Darwen Borough Council	137	53	163,801	1,195	3,100	1998	Borough, Non-metropolitan district, Non-metropolitan county	Lancashire	Lancashire CCA
Blackpool	Blackpool Council	35	14	143,492	4,115	10,660	1998	Borough, Non-metropolitan district, Non-metropolitan county	Lancashire	Lancashire CCA
Bolton	Bolton Metropolitan Borough Council	140	54	309,732	2,216	5,740	1974	Borough, Metropolitan district	Greater Manchester	Greater Manchester CA
Bournemouth, Christchurch and Poole	Bournemouth, Christchurch and Poole Council	162	63	405,829	2,504	6,490	2019	Non-metropolitan district, Non-metropolitan county	Dorset	None
Bracknell Forest	Bracknell Forest Borough Council	109	42	132,145	1,208	3,130	1998	Borough, Non-metropolitan district	Berkshire	None
Bradford	Bradford City Council	366	141	557,758	1,522	3,940	1974	City, Borough, Metropolitan district	West Yorkshire	West Yorkshire CA
Brent	Brent London Borough Council	43	17	352,201	8,146	21,100	1965	Borough, London Borough	Greater London	GLA
Brighton and Hove	Brighton and Hove City Council	83	32	284,170	3,431	8,890	1997	City, Borough, Non-metropolitan district, Non-metropolitan county	East Sussex	Sussex and Brighton CCA
Bristol	Bristol City Council	110	42	495,260	4,516	11,700	1996	City, Borough, Non-metropolitan district, Non-metropolitan county	Bristol	West of England CA
Bromley	Bromley London Borough Council	150	58	336,048	2,238	5,800	1965	Borough, London Borough	Greater London	GLA
Buckinghamshire	Buckinghamshire Council	1,565	604	584,296	373	970	2020	Non-metropolitan district, Non-metropolitan county	Buckinghamshire	None
Bury	Bury Metropolitan Borough Council	99	38	199,271	2,004	5,190	1974	Borough, Metropolitan district	Greater Manchester	Greater Manchester CA
Calderdale	Calderdale Metropolitan Borough Council	364	141	210,734	579	1,500	1974	Borough, Metropolitan district	West Yorkshire	West Yorkshire CA
Camden	Camden London Borough Council	22	8.5	216,658	9,948	25,770	1965	Borough, London Borough	Greater London	GLA
Central Bedfordshire	Central Bedfordshire Council	716	276	321,605	449	1,160	2009	Non-metropolitan district, Non-metropolitan county	Bedfordshire	None
Cheshire East	Cheshire East Council	1,166	450	425,459	365	950	2009	Borough, Non-metropolitan district, Non-metropolitan county	Cheshire	Cheshire and Warrington CA
Cheshire West and Chester	Cheshire West and Chester Council	920	360	373,951	406	1,050	2009	Borough, Non-metropolitan district, Non-metropolitan county	Cheshire	Cheshire and Warrington CA
Cornwall	Cornwall Council	3,545	1,369	584,782	165	430	2009	Non-metropolitan district, Non-metropolitan county	Cornwall	None
Coventry	Coventry City Council	99	38	364,766	3,698	9,580	1974	City, Borough, Metropolitan district	West Midlands	West Midlands CA
Croydon	Croydon London Borough Council	86	33	410,085	4,743	12,280	1965	Borough, London Borough	Greater London	GLA
Cumberland	Cumberland Council	3,012	1,163	282,343	94	240	2023	Non-metropolitan district, Non-metropolitan county	Cumbria	Cumbria CA
Darlington	Darlington Borough Council	197	76	113,402	574	1,490	1997	Borough, Non-metropolitan district, Non-metropolitan county	County Durham	Tees Valley CA
Derby	Derby City Council	78	30	275,344	3,529	9,140	1997	City, Borough, Non-metropolitan district, Non-metropolitan county	Derbyshire	East Midlands CCA
Doncaster	Doncaster Metropolitan Borough Council	568	219	323,016	569	1,470	1974	Borough, Metropolitan district	South Yorkshire	South Yorkshire Mayoral Combined Authority
Dorset	Dorset Council	2,491	962	391,036	157	410	2019	Non-metropolitan district, Non-metropolitan county	Dorset	None
Dudley	Dudley Metropolitan Borough Council	98	38	333,941	3,408	8,830	1974	Borough, Metropolitan district	West Midlands	West Midlands CA
County Durham	Durham County Council	2,226	859	539,146	242	630	2009	Non-metropolitan district, Non-metropolitan county	County Durham	North East Mayoral Strategic Authority
Ealing	Ealing London Borough Council	56	22	387,072	6,969	18,050	1965	Borough, London Borough	Greater London	GLA
East Riding of Yorkshire	East Riding of Yorkshire Council	2,404	928	360,334	150	390	1996	Non-metropolitan district, Non-metropolitan county	East Riding of Yorkshire	Hull and East Yorkshire CA
Enfield	Enfield London Borough Council	81	31	329,400	4,077	10,560	1965	Borough, London Borough	Greater London	GLA
Gateshead	Gateshead Metropolitan Borough Council	142	55	202,509	1,423	3,690	1974	Borough, Metropolitan district	Tyne and Wear	North East Mayoral Strategic Authority
Greenwich	Greenwich London Borough Council	47	18	301,225	6,367	16,490	1965	Royal Borough, London Borough	Greater London	GLA
Hackney	Hackney London Borough Council	19	7.3	266,241	13,980	36,200	1965	Borough, London Borough	Greater London	GLA
Halton	Halton Borough Council	79	31	131,912	1,668	4,320	1998	Borough, Non-metropolitan district, Non-metropolitan county	Cheshire	Liverpool City Region CA
Hammersmith and Fulham	Hammersmith and Fulham London Borough Council	16	6.2	190,216	11,598	30,040	1965	Borough, London Borough	Greater London	GLA
Haringey	Haringey London Borough Council	30	12	266,218	8,992	23,290	1965	Borough, London Borough	Greater London	GLA
Harrow	Harrow London Borough Council	50	19	272,612	5,402	13,990	1965	Borough, London Borough	Greater London	GLA
Hartlepool	Hartlepool Borough Council	94	36	99,656	1,063	2,750	1996	Borough, Non-metropolitan district, Non-metropolitan county	County Durham	Tees Valley CA
Havering	Havering London Borough Council	112	43	280,787	2,500	6,500	1965	Borough, London Borough	Greater London	GLA
Herefordshire	Herefordshire Council	2,180	840	192,539	88	230	1998	Non-metropolitan district, Non-metropolitan county	Herefordshire	None
Hillingdon	Hillingdon London Borough Council	116	45	326,671	2,823	7,310	1965	Borough, London Borough	Greater London	GLA
Hounslow	Hounslow London Borough Council	56	22	299,486	5,352	13,860	1965	Borough, London Borough	Greater London	GLA
Isle of Wight	Isle of Wight Council	380	150	140,777	371	960	1995	Non-metropolitan district, Non-metropolitan county	Isle of Wight	Hampshire and the Solent CCA
Isles of Scilly	Council of the Isles of Scilly	16	6.2	2,299	141	370	1890	Sui generis local government area	Cornwall	None
Islington	Islington London Borough Council	15	5.8	224,551	15,113	39,140	1965	Borough, London Borough	Greater London	GLA
Kensington and Chelsea	Kensington and Chelsea London Borough Council	12	4.6	145,734	12,019	31,130	1965	Royal Borough, London Borough	Greater London	GLA
Kingston upon Hull	Hull City Council	72	28	273,257	3,818	9,890	1996	City, Borough, Non-metropolitan district, Non-metropolitan county	East Riding of Yorkshire	Hull and East Yorkshire CA
Kingston upon Thames	Kingston upon Thames London Borough Council	37	14	172,761	4,637	12,010	1965	Borough, London Borough	Greater London	GLA
Kirklees	Kirklees Metropolitan Borough Council	409	158	445,832	1,091	2,830	1974	Borough, Metropolitan district	West Yorkshire	West Yorkshire CA
Knowsley	Knowsley Metropolitan Borough Council	87	34	163,723	1,893	4,900	1974	Borough, Metropolitan district	Merseyside	Liverpool City Region CA
Lambeth	Lambeth London Borough Council	27	10	314,298	11,724	30,370	1965	Borough, London Borough	Greater London	GLA
Leeds	Leeds City Council	552	213	840,550	1,524	3,950	1974	City, Borough, Metropolitan district	West Yorkshire	West Yorkshire CA
Leicester	Leicester City Council	73	28	383,116	5,224	13,530	1997	City, Borough, Non-metropolitan district, Non-metropolitan county	Leicestershire	None
Lewisham	Lewisham London Borough Council	35	14	301,037	8,565	22,180	1965	Borough, London Borough	Greater London	GLA
Liverpool	Liverpool City Council	112	43	507,915	4,541	11,760	1974	City, Borough, Metropolitan district	Merseyside	Liverpool City Region CA
City of London	City of London Corporation	3	1.2	15,631	5,409	14,010	886	City, Sui generis local government area	City of London	GLA
Luton	Luton Borough Council	43	17	236,380	5,452	14,120	1997	Borough, Non-metropolitan district, Non-metropolitan county	Bedfordshire	None
Manchester	Manchester City Council	116	45	588,256	5,086	13,170	1974	City, Borough, Metropolitan district	Greater Manchester	Greater Manchester CA
Medway	Medway Council	194	75	292,697	1,511	3,910	1998	Borough, Non-metropolitan district, Non-metropolitan county	Kent	None
Merton	Merton London Borough Council	38	15	218,891	5,818	15,070	1965	Borough, London Borough	Greater London	GLA
Middlesbrough	Middlesbrough Council	54	21	152,795	2,836	7,350	1996	Borough, Non-metropolitan district, Non-metropolitan county	North Yorkshire	Tees Valley CA
Milton Keynes	Milton Keynes City Council	309	119	308,866	1,001	2,590	1997	City, Borough, Non-metropolitan district, Non-metropolitan county	Buckinghamshire	None
Newcastle-upon-Tyne	Newcastle City Council	113	44	320,838	2,828	7,320	1974	City, Borough, Metropolitan district	Tyne and Wear	North East Mayoral Strategic Authority
Newham	Newham London Borough Council	36	14	376,542	10,403	26,940	1965	Borough, London Borough	Greater London	GLA
North East Lincolnshire	North East Lincolnshire Council	193	75	160,101	831	2,150	1996	Borough, Non-metropolitan district, Non-metropolitan county	Lincolnshire	Greater Lincolnshire CCA
North Lincolnshire	North Lincolnshire Council	375	145	137,365	366	950	1996	Borough, Non-metropolitan district, Non-metropolitan county	Lincolnshire	Greater Lincolnshire CCA
North Northamptonshire	North Northamptonshire Council	987	381	379,569	385	1,000	2021	Non-metropolitan district, Non-metropolitan county	Northamptonshire	None
North Somerset	North Somerset Council	374	144	227,160	608	1,570	1996	Non-metropolitan district, Non-metropolitan county	Somerset	None
North Tyneside	North Tyneside Metropolitan Borough Council	82	32	215,401	2,617	6,780	1974	Borough, Metropolitan district	Tyne and Wear	North East Mayoral Strategic Authority
North Yorkshire	North Yorkshire Council	8,037	3,103	639,133	80	210	2023	Non-metropolitan district, Non-metropolitan county	North Yorkshire	York and North Yorkshire CA
Northumberland	Northumberland County Council	5,020	1,940	333,975	67	170	2009	Non-metropolitan district, Non-metropolitan county	Northumberland	North East Mayoral Strategic Authority
Nottingham	Nottingham City Council	75	29	325,765	4,365	11,310	1998	City, Borough, Non-metropolitan district, Non-metropolitan county	Nottinghamshire	East Midlands CCA
Oldham	Oldham Metropolitan Borough Council	142	55	251,915	1,770	4,600	1974	Borough, Metropolitan district	Greater Manchester	Greater Manchester CA
Peterborough	Peterborough City Council	343	132	224,757	655	1,700	1998	City, Borough, Non-metropolitan district, Non-metropolitan county	Cambridgeshire	Cambridgeshire and Peterborough CA
Plymouth	Plymouth City Council	80	31	271,361	3,399	8,800	1998	City, Borough, Non-metropolitan district, Non-metropolitan county	Devon	None
Portsmouth	Portsmouth City Council	40	15	211,475	5,236	13,560	1997	City, Borough, Non-metropolitan district, Non-metropolitan county	Hampshire	Hampshire and the Solent CCA
Reading	Reading Borough Council	40	15	183,762	4,549	11,780	1998	Borough, Non-metropolitan district	Berkshire	None
Redbridge	Redbridge London Borough Council	56	22	321,829	5,707	14,780	1965	Borough, London Borough	Greater London	GLA
Redcar and Cleveland	Redcar and Cleveland Borough Council	245	95	139,541	569	1,470	1996	Borough, Non-metropolitan district, Non-metropolitan county	North Yorkshire	Tees Valley CA
Richmond upon Thames	Richmond upon Thames London Borough Council	57	22	196,713	3,428	8,880	1965	Borough, London Borough	Greater London	GLA
Rochdale	Rochdale Metropolitan Borough Council	158	61	237,641	1,503	3,890	1974	Borough, Metropolitan district	Greater Manchester	Greater Manchester CA
Rotherham	Rotherham Metropolitan Borough Council	287	111	279,161	974	2,520	1974	Borough, Metropolitan district	South Yorkshire	South Yorkshire Mayoral Combined Authority
Rutland	Rutland County Council	382	147	41,629	109	280	1997	Non-metropolitan district, Non-metropolitan county	Rutland	None
Salford	Salford City Council	97	37	297,004	3,056	7,920	1974	City, Borough, Metropolitan district	Greater Manchester	Greater Manchester CA
Sandwell	Sandwell Metropolitan Borough Council	86	33	352,918	4,124	10,680	1974	Borough, Metropolitan district	West Midlands	West Midlands CA
Sefton	Sefton Metropolitan Borough Council	157	61	287,583	1,837	4,760	1974	Borough, Metropolitan district	Merseyside	Liverpool City Region CA
Sheffield	Sheffield City Council	368	142	579,517	1,575	4,080	1974	City, Borough, Metropolitan district	South Yorkshire	South Yorkshire Mayoral Combined Authority
Shropshire	Shropshire Council	3,197	1,234	333,162	104	270	2009	Non-metropolitan district, Non-metropolitan county	Shropshire	None
Slough	Slough Borough Council	33	13	167,450	5,146	13,330	1998	Borough, Non-metropolitan district	Berkshire	None
Solihull	Solihull Metropolitan Borough Council	178	69	221,449	1,242	3,220	1974	Borough, Metropolitan district	West Midlands	West Midlands CA
Somerset	Somerset Council	3,450	1,330	590,972	171	440	2023	Non-metropolitan district, Non-metropolitan county	Somerset	None
South Gloucestershire	South Gloucestershire Council	497	192	308,787	621	1,610	1996	Non-metropolitan district, Non-metropolitan county	Gloucestershire	West of England CA
South Tyneside	South Tyneside Metropolitan Borough Council	64	25	151,255	2,348	6,080	1974	Borough, Metropolitan district	Tyne and Wear	North East Mayoral Strategic Authority
Southampton	Southampton City Council	50	19	259,230	5,197	13,460	1997	City, Borough, Non-metropolitan district, Non-metropolitan county	Hampshire	Hampshire and the Solent CCA
Southend-on-Sea	Southend-on-Sea City Council	42	16	185,214	4,444	11,510	1998	City, Borough, Non-metropolitan district, Non-metropolitan county	Essex	Greater Essex CCA (planned)
Southwark	Southwark London Borough Council	29	11	312,366	10,817	28,020	1965	Borough, London Borough	Greater London	GLA
St Helens	St Helens Metropolitan Borough Council	136	53	189,890	1,393	3,610	1974	Borough, Metropolitan district	Merseyside	Liverpool City Region CA
Stockport	Stockport Metropolitan Borough Council	126	49	304,879	2,419	6,270	1974	Borough, Metropolitan district	Greater Manchester	Greater Manchester CA
Stockton-on-Tees	Stockton-on-Tees Borough Council	205	79	207,158	1,011	2,620	1996	Borough, Non-metropolitan district, Non-metropolitan county	County Durham and North Yorkshire	Tees Valley CA
Stoke-on-Trent	Stoke-on-Trent City Council	93	36	272,282	2,914	7,550	1998	City, Borough, Non-metropolitan district, Non-metropolitan county	Staffordshire	None
Sunderland	Sunderland City Council	137	53	287,070	2,089	5,410	1974	City, Borough, Metropolitan district	Tyne and Wear	North East Mayoral Strategic Authority
Sutton	Sutton London Borough Council	44	17	213,972	4,880	12,600	1965	Borough, London Borough	Greater London	GLA
Swindon	Swindon Borough Council	230	89	245,286	1,066	2,760	1997	Borough, Non-metropolitan district, Non-metropolitan county	Wiltshire	None
Tameside	Tameside Metropolitan Borough Council	103	40	240,822	2,335	6,050	1974	Borough, Metropolitan district	Greater Manchester	Greater Manchester CA
Telford and Wrekin	Telford and Wrekin Borough Council	290	110	199,378	687	1,780	1998	Borough, Non-metropolitan district, Non-metropolitan county	Shropshire	None
Thurrock	Thurrock Council	164	63	181,664	1,109	2,870	1998	Borough, Non-metropolitan district, Non-metropolitan county	Essex	Greater Essex CCA (planned)
Torbay	Torbay Council	63	24	139,486	2,218	5,740	1998	Borough, Non-metropolitan district, Non-metropolitan county	Devon	Devon and Torbay CCA
Tower Hamlets	Tower Hamlets London Borough Council	20	7.7	334,240	16,906	43,790	1965	Borough, London Borough	Greater London	GLA
Trafford	Trafford Metropolitan Borough Council	106	41	240,981	2,273	5,890	1974	Borough, Metropolitan district	Greater Manchester	Greater Manchester CA
Wakefield	Wakefield City Council	339	131	369,450	1,091	2,830	1974	City, Borough, Metropolitan district	West Yorkshire	West Yorkshire CA
Walsall	Walsall Metropolitan Borough Council	104	40	295,722	2,844	7,370	1974	Borough, Metropolitan district	West Midlands	West Midlands CA
Waltham Forest	Waltham Forest London Borough Council	39	15	283,713	7,310	18,900	1965	Borough, London Borough	Greater London	GLA
Wandsworth	Wandsworth London Borough Council	34	13	339,859	9,919	25,690	1965	Borough, London Borough	Greater London	GLA
Warrington	Warrington Borough Council	181	70	215,425	1,193	3,090	1998	Borough, Non-metropolitan district, Non-metropolitan county	Cheshire	Cheshire and Warrington CA
West Berkshire	West Berkshire Council	704	272	165,523	235	610	1998	Non-metropolitan district	Berkshire	None
West Northamptonshire	West Northamptonshire Council	1,377	532	444,218	323	840	2021	Non-metropolitan district, Non-metropolitan county	Northamptonshire	None
Westminster	Westminster City Council	21	8.1	212,367	9,886	25,600	1965	City, Borough, London Borough	Greater London	GLA
Westmorland and Furness	Westmorland and Furness Council	3,756	1,450	231,307	62	160	2023	Non-metropolitan district, Non-metropolitan county	Cumbria	Cumbria CA
Wigan	Wigan Metropolitan Borough Council	188	73	347,089	1,845	4,780	1974	Borough, Metropolitan district	Greater Manchester	Greater Manchester CA
Wiltshire	Wiltshire Council	3,255	1,257	526,392	162	420	2009	Non-metropolitan district, Non-metropolitan county	Wiltshire	None
Windsor and Maidenhead	Windsor and Maidenhead Borough Council	196	76	159,776	813	2,110	1998	Royal borough, Non-metropolitan district	Berkshire	None
Wirral	Wirral Metropolitan Borough Council	161	62	329,896	2,050	5,300	1974	Borough, Metropolitan district	Merseyside	Liverpool City Region CA
Wokingham	Wokingham Borough Council	179	69	189,024	1,056	2,740	1998	Borough, Non-metropolitan district	Berkshire	None
Wolverhampton	Wolverhampton City Council	69	27	281,434	4,053	10,500	1974	City, Borough, Metropolitan district	West Midlands	West Midlands CA
York	City of York Council	272	105	209,118	769	1,990	1996	City, Borough, Non-metropolitan district, Non-metropolitan county	North Yorkshire	York and North Yorkshire CA

=== Upcoming unitary authorities ===
The Secretary of State for Housing, Communities and Local Government has decided to approve the creation of the following upcoming unitary authorities.

Unitary authority area	Council	Land area		Population (2024)	Density		Status	Creation date	Type	Ceremonial county	Strategic authority
Unitary authority area	Council	(km^{2})	(mi^{2})	Population (2024)	(/km^{2})	(/mi^{2})	Status	Creation date	Type	Ceremonial county	Strategic authority
East Surrey	East Surrey Council			563,643			Confirmed	1 April 2027	Non-metropolitan district, Non-metropolitan county	Surrey	None
West Surrey	West Surrey Council			685,006			Confirmed	1 April 2027	Non-metropolitan district, Non-metropolitan county	Surrey	None

=== Former unitary authorities ===
Unitary authority area	Council	Created	Dissolved	Type	Ceremonial county	Replaced by
Bournemouth	Bournemouth Borough Council	1997	2019	Borough, Non-metropolitan district, Non-metropolitan county	Dorset	Bournemouth, Christchurch and Poole
Poole	Poole Borough Council	1997	2019	Borough, Non-metropolitan district, Non-metropolitan county	Dorset	Bournemouth, Christchurch and Poole

== See also ==
- Local government in England
- History of local government in England
- List of county councils in England
- Political make-up of unitary authorities in England
