= Devolution Priority Programme =

The Devolution Priority Programme was announced by the UK government in 2025 in line with the English Devolution and Community Empowerment Bill. The areas included within the programme will have certain devolved functions transferred to them from central government via the establishment of new combined authorities (CAs) or combined county authorities (CCAs).

== History ==
In February 2025 six areas were announced for the programme. In December 2025, mayoral elections were delayed from 2026 to 2028 in four of the priority programme areas.

== Summary ==
As of 6 June 2026, the status of the programme is as follows:

Authority	Status	Constituent councils	LGR	S.I.	Created	First election	Ref.
Cheshire and Warrington CA	Formally established, awaiting mayoral powers	Cheshire East; Cheshire West and Chester; Warrington	None	Made	24 February 2026	2027	
Cumbria CA	Formally established, awaiting mayoral powers	Cumberland; Westmorland and Furness	None	Made	24 February 2026	2027	
Greater Essex CCA	Not yet formally established	Essex; Thurrock; Southend-on-Sea	Yes		Expected 2026	Expected 2028	
Hampshire and the Solent CCA	Formally established, awaiting mayoral powers	Hampshire; Isle of Wight; Portsmouth; Southampton	Yes	Made	4 June 2026	2028	
Norfolk and Suffolk CCA	Not yet formally established	Norfolk; Suffolk	Yes		Expected 2026	Expected 2028	
Sussex and Brighton CCA	Formally established, awaiting mayoral powers	Brighton and Hove; East Sussex; West Sussex	Yes	Made	26 March 2026	2028	

== See also ==
- Upcoming structural changes to local government in England
