= Cities and Local Government Devolution Act 2016 =

Act of the Parliament of the United Kingdom

Cities and Local Government Devolution Act 2016 (Note: Section 26.)
- Act of Parliament
- Parliament of the United Kingdom
- Long title: An Act to make provision for the election of mayors for the areas of, and for conferring additional functions on, combined authorities established under Part 6 of the Local Democracy, Economic Development and Construction Act 2009; to make other provision in relation to bodies established under that Part; to make provision about local authority governance and functions; to confer power to establish, and to make provision about, sub-national transport bodies; and for connected purposes.
- Citation: 2016 c. 1
- Introduced by: Greg Clark (Commons); Baroness Williams of Trafford (Lords)
- Territorial extent: England and Wales (Note: Section 24.)

Dates
- Royal assent: 28 January 2016
- Commencement: 28 January 2016 (sections 24–25); 25 March 2016 (rest of act); (Note: Section 25.)
Other legislation
Amends	Local Government Act 1972; Local Government Act 1985; Local Government Finance Act 1988; Local Government and Housing Act 1989; Local Government Finance Act 1992; Railways Act 1993; Environment Act 1995; Police Act 1996; Local Government Act 1999; Local Government Act 2000; Freedom of Information Act 2000; Local Government Act 2003; National Health Service Act 2006; Local Transport Act 2008; Local Democracy, Economic Development and Construction Act 2009; Equality Act 2010; Localism Act 2011; Local Audit and Accountability Act 2014
Amended by	The National Health Service (Cross-Border Healthcare and Miscellaneous Amendments etc.) (EU Exit) Regulations 2019; Health and Care Act 2022; Levelling-up and Regeneration Act 2023; English Devolution and Community Empowerment Act 2026

Status: Amended

History of passage through Parliament

Text of statute as originally enacted

Revised text of statute as amended

The Cities and Local Government Devolution Act 2016 (c. 1) is an act of the Parliament of the United Kingdom that allows for the introduction of directly elected mayors to combined authorities in England and the devolution of housing, transport, planning and policing powers to them. The bill was introduced to the House of Lords by Baroness Williams of Trafford, the Parliamentary Under Secretary of State for Communities and Local Government, on 28 May 2015.

== Background ==
The United Kingdom (UK) is a unitary state consisting of four countries. Devolution has been enacted for three of these countries (Scotland, Wales and Northern Ireland) providing each with its own legislative assembly or parliament. However, this has not happened for England which continues to be administered by the Government of the United Kingdom and legislated for by the Parliament of the United Kingdom. Proposals for the introduction of devolution to English regional governments were made at various points during the twentieth century. However, after a proposal for devolution to an elected North East Assembly was rejected in a referendum in North East England in 2004, the regional government approach was abandoned. Instead, the idea of devolution to smaller English "city regions" gained predominance, giving rise to calls for enabling legislation.

== Provisions ==
The main provisions of the act are:

- To allow for the devolution of powers from the UK government to some of England's towns, cities and counties.
- To allow for the introduction of directly elected mayors to combined authorities.
- To allow directly elected mayors to replace Police and Crime Commissioners (PCCs) in these areas.
- To remove the current statutory limitation on the functions of these local authorities. (Previously they have been limited to economic development, regeneration, and transport.)
- To enable local authority governance to be streamlined as agreed by councils.

The provisions in the act are generic (applied by government order to specified combined authorities and their areas). It is expected to apply primarily to England's largest city-regions (the Core Cities Group). However, there could be instances where the devolution of powers could be agreed to "a single county" or other local government area where a combined authority is not in place, provided all the councils in that area are in agreement. Additionally local government reorganisation may be facilitated by the bill if local authorities in an area are willing and the proposal is agreed by the Secretary of State for Communities and Local Government.

The legislation allowed Transport for the North to be put on an statutory footing and allowed for further sub-national transport bodies to be created.

== Amendments in the House of Commons ==
A clause added to the bill in the House of Commons in December 2015 confers general powers on National Park authorities for National Parks in England, along similar lines to those conferred on other local authorities by the Localism Act 2011.

== Amendments in the House of Lords ==
A number of amendments were passed in the House of Lords despite opposition from the UK Government, but were partly overturned by the House of Commons. These included:

- The requirement that an annual 'devolution report' is presented to Parliament and a 'devolution statement' is included in every Government Bill. The part of this amendment requiring an annual report became included in the act.
- The lowering of the voting age in local elections to 16. The amendment was eventually defeated and Baroness Williams commented: "It may be appropriate to have a full discussion on the franchise in the round at another time but now is not the time to do it."
- A regulation preventing the Government from making the devolution of powers conditional on the creation of an elected mayor. This amendment was subsequently overturned in the House of Commons, but any councils which object to the creation of an elected mayor may be removed from the combined authority.
- The right of a future referendum to abolish any local authority elected mayor established following a Government-mandated referendum. This amendment was included in the act, which modifies the Local Government Act 2000 to this effect.

== In Committee ==
In July 2015 the Communities and Local Government Committee announced that it would undertake an inquiry into the Bill during the autumn of 2015. The committee examined the lessons that could be learned from City Deals arranged in 2012–14, whether the GMCA devolution proposals provided a model for other areas, and how local accountability could be improved. The committee's report was published in February 2016. It proposed:

- Increasing public engagement and consultation throughout the deal-making process
- Making that process more open and transparent
- The need for a system for the monitoring and review of deals once in place
- The need for clear objectives and measures for local areas to judge the impact of their deal

The committee also believed "fiscal devolution to be essential to genuine devolution" and proposed an increase in the devolution of taxation and borrowing.

In July 2016 the Public Accounts Committee criticised the lack of clarity in the objectives and financial implications of devolution deals, as well as the shortage of local scrutiny arrangements.

== Devolution deals ==
The Act takes the form of enabling legislation and requires negotiations between the UK government and local authorities (or groups of local authorities), known as devolution deals, to bring any transfer of budgets and/or powers into effect. The negotiation of such deals initially took place during 2014–15, and by September 2015 a total of 38 towns, cities, counties and regions had submitted devolution proposals to the government (including four bids from Scotland and Wales). However, many rural areas did not submit devolution proposals and in some places devolution was rejected by local councillors. By 2017 the process of making new deals appeared to have stalled.

=== Greater Manchester ===
Three agreements made between November 2014 and July 2015 led to proposals for the transfer of a number of powers and funding streams to the Greater Manchester Combined Authority (GMCA) and other bodies in the Greater Manchester area, together with the creation of a directly elected mayor or "metro-mayor", a role similar that of the Mayor of London. The mayor is to have powers over transport, housing, strategic planning and policing. At the same time the GMCA is to acquire new powers including some control over business growth as well as health and social care budgets. In May 2015, Tony Lloyd was selected to be interim mayor by the GMCA. Devolution took place in 2017 following a Greater Manchester mayoral election, making Greater Manchester the first city region to do so.

=== South Yorkshire ===
South Yorkshire Mayoral Combined Authority came into being as a result of two agreements made between December 2014 and October 2015 proposing the transfer of powers and budgets over transport, planning, economic development, adult skills and business rates, with a directly elected mayor separate from the police and crime commissioner. The mayoralty covers four of the constituent members of the city region: the boroughs of Barnsley, Doncaster, Rotherham and Sheffield. Some of the devolution details are different from those in the case of Greater Manchester, and Health and Social Care are not to be transferred. Devolution and elections were scheduled to take place in 2018 and in May 2018 Dan Jarvis was elected as the first mayor of the authority. The devolution of powers and funding have been delayed while Jarvis and the leaders of Barnsley and Doncaster councils seek a devolution deal for the whole of Yorkshire.

=== West Yorkshire ===
An agreement announced in March 2015 proposed devolving to the West Yorkshire Combined Authority some powers over education and training, economic development, housing and transport. The agreement was finalised in March 2020.

=== Cornwall ===
In July 2015, devolution arrangements for Cornwall were announced. Cornwall was the first county in England to acquire powers devolved from London under the legislation. Cornwall Council (and the Council of the Isles of Scilly to a lesser degree) gained some new powers concerning transport, employment and skills, EU funding, business support, energy, health and social care, public estate, heritage and culture. Cornwall was not required to elect a mayor or form a combined authority. Further devolution to Cornwall Council was agreed in 2023.

=== Other areas ===
Four other existing combined authorities applied for and were awarded devolution deals: Liverpool City Region Combined Authority, North East Combined Authority, Tees Valley Combined Authority and West Midlands Combined Authority. In addition three proposed new authorities and devolution agreements were announced in the 2016 United Kingdom budget: the East Anglia Combined Authority, the Greater Lincolnshire Combined Authority and the West of England Combined Authority (Bristol and surrounding area). The proposed North Midlands Combined Authority also agreed a devolution deal.

However, failure to agree on the creation of the Greater Lincolnshire Combined Authority and the East Anglia Combined Authority led to the formation of the Cambridgeshire and Peterborough Combined Authority with its own devolution deal. Buckinghamshire, Oxfordshire and Northamptonshire have proposed the formation of a combined authority but do not have agreement of the district councils. A "Solent devolution bid" for a combined authority covering Southampton, Portsmouth and the Isle of Wight was abandoned because consensus could not be reached. A "Heart of Hampshire" devolution bid covering the rest of Hampshire county was similarly abandoned. Proposals for devolution to Cumbria and Greater Essex were rejected by council leaders. Plans for devolution to a North Midlands combined authority incorporating Derbyshire and Nottinghamshire were dropped following changes to legislation in March 2016 that allowed borough councils the option of taking part in devolution deals in neighbouring counties.

Other areas which have proposed devolution under this legislation include the London boroughs (putting forward plans for sub-regional devolution within London), Leicestershire, Gloucestershire, North Yorkshire and East Riding of Yorkshire, Surrey and Sussex, Cheshire and Warrington, Devon and Somerset, Dorset, and Lancashire.

In July 2016 the mayor of London, Sadiq Khan, announced a new Finance Commission tasked with drawing up a "wide-ranging suite of devolution requests" for further devolution to Greater London.

== Debate ==
The adoption of directly elected mayors in English local government is part of a much larger, international trend on similar lines, with European countries such as Italy, Hungary, Poland, Romania and Slovenia already making use of elected mayors. There has reportedly been widespread scepticism among existing local government leaders in England about the creation of the proposed directly elected mayors. However, most areas in England are not expected to have such mayors, meaning the majority of PCCs will remain. This has prompted senior figures in county and district councils to raise concerns about a "two-speed" approach to devolution and the Local Government Association to call for devolution to all corners of England. Sir Peter Soulsby, the city of Leicester's elected mayor, has said that it is important for rural areas not to be overlooked.

The proposals to devolve Health and Social Care have raised questions of a financial and constitutional nature:

- The budget for the Department for Communities and Local Government decreased by around 50% between 2010–11 and 2015–16, while the budget for the Department of Health increased during the same period. If no ringfencing is put in place the possibility will exist for Department of Health grant money to be spent on other local authority activities.
- Most NHS providers are allowed to run a deficit to ensure continuity of service but local authorities are required by law to balance their budgets.
- Clauses eight and 17 of the act provide for the dissolution of NHS bodies and the transfer of their functions and assets to local authorities or combined authorities through an affirmative order. There is relatively limited scope for MPs to debate such an order and no option to amend it.
- The accountability of the Secretary of State for Health is not explicitly guaranteed when the NHS provider falls under a different government department. However, clause 19 of the act (which was inserted in the House of Lords) confirms the continuation of NHS accountabilities and the regulatory responsibilities of the Care Quality Commission, Monitor (NHS) and others under devolved arrangements.

== See also ==
- Combined authority
- Local Democracy, Economic Development and Construction Act 2009
- Localism Act 2011
- Police and crime commissioner
- Devolution in the United Kingdom
