= English Devolution and Community Empowerment Act 2026 =

Act of the Parliament of the United Kingdom

English Devolution and Community Empowerment Act 2026 (Note: Section 109.)
- Act of Parliament
- Parliament of the United Kingdom
- Long title: An Act to make provision about combined authorities, combined county authorities, the Greater London Authority, local councils, police and crime commissioners and fire and rescue authorities, local audit and terms in business tenancies about rent
- Citation: 2026 c. 23
- Introduced by: Angela Rayner, Secretary of State for Housing, Communities and Local Government (Commons); Sharon Taylor, Baroness Taylor of Stevenage, Parliamentary Under-Secretary of State for Housing and Local Government (Lords)
- Territorial extent: England and Wales (Note: Section 107.)

Dates
- Royal assent: 29 April 2026
- Commencement: Various (Note: Section 108.)
Other legislation
Amends	Representation of the People Act 1983; Town and Country Planning Act 1990; Planning (Hazardous Substances) Act 1990; Police Act 1996; Education Act 1996; Greater London Authority Act 1999; Local Government Act 2000; Local Democracy, Economic Development and Construction Act 2009; Localism Act 2011; Police Reform and Social Responsibility Act 2011; Cities and Local Government Devolution Act 2016; Elections Act 2022; Levelling-up and Regeneration Act 2023

Status: Current legislation

History of passage through Parliament

Text of statute as originally enacted

The English Devolution and Community Empowerment Act 2026 (c. 23) is an act of Parliament which establishes a new framework for devolution of powers to strategic authorities, local authorities, police and crime commissioners, and fire and rescue authorities in England.

== Background ==
Powers were devolved to varying degrees to Scotland, Wales and Northern Ireland by Tony Blair's Labour government in the late 1990s through the establishment of the Scottish Parliament, the Senedd and the Northern Ireland Assembly. A devolved legislature and government was not created for England, which remained under the full jurisdiction of the United Kingdom parliament and government based in Westminster.

A strategic regional authority for Greater London, known as the Greater London Authority (GLA) was established in 2000. Plans for elected regional assemblies in the eight English regions outside Greater London were abandoned following an unsuccessful referendum held in the North East region in 2004. Instead, sub-regional combined authorities (CAs) were gradually established after the Conservatives came to power in 2010, starting in 2011, under the terms of the Local Democracy, Economic Development and Construction Act 2009 and Localism Act 2011.

Initially, CAs were led by boards of local authority leaders. The Cities and Local Government Devolution Act 2016 allowed for the creation of directly elected CA mayors. Further competencies were granted to CAs by the Levelling-up and Regeneration Act 2023 which also introduced an alternative model of devolved public authority, combined county authorities (CCAs). As of June 2026, 13 CAs and six CCAs have been established in England, with additional proposals in development. Directly elected mayors of the GLA, CAs, and CCAs regularly meet UK government ministers through the Mayoral Council for England and the Council of the Nations and Regions, which were established in October 2024.

In 2023, the Labour Party under Keir Starmer pledged to introduce a "Take Back Control Bill" in its first term if it returned to power, which would devolve more powers to communities in England on issues such as housing, transport, employment support, energy and childcare. Starmer pledged that this bill would be detailed in Labour's first King's Speech, and after its victory in the 2024 general election, plans by the Labour government for this bill, now officially named the English Devolution Bill, were outlined in the King's Speech at the State Opening of Parliament in July 2024.

== White paper ==
The English Devolution White Paper published in December 2024 (click to read all pages)

An English devolution white paper was published on 16 December 2024, outlining key provisions expected in the English Devolution Bill.

=== Proposals ===
- Designation of the GLA, CAs, and CCAs as strategic authorities.
- Strategic authorities to be given competencies over transport and local infrastructure; skills and employment support; housing and strategic planning; economic development and regeneration; environment and climate change; health, wellbeing and public service reform; and public safety.
- Police and crime commissioner or police, fire and crime commissioner powers to be granted to strategic authority mayors where police and fire boundaries align with strategic authority boundaries.
- Structural changes to local government in England to move two-tier areas to a unitary structure.

=== Structural changes to local government ===
Jim McMahon, Minister for Local Government and English Devolution, wrote to the following two-tier local authorities and neighbouring unitary authorities in February 2025 to set out a timetable for reorganisation proposals to be submitted: an interim plan by 21 March 2025 and a full proposal by 28 November 2025. The letters included guidance that proposals should seek to establish one or more unitary authorities per area, with a "sensible geography which will help to increase housing supply and meet local needs" and with a rough population of 500,000 or more, including evidence of local engagement activity.

- Cambridgeshire and Peterborough
- Derbyshire and Derby
- Devon, Plymouth, and Torbay
- East Sussex and Brighton
- Essex, Southend-on-Sea, and Thurrock
- Gloucestershire
- Hampshire, Isle of Wight, Portsmouth, and Southampton
- Hertfordshire
- Kent and Medway
- Lancashire, Blackburn with Darwen, and Blackpool
- Leicestershire, Leicester, and Rutland
- Lincolnshire, North Lincolnshire, and North East Lincolnshire
- Norfolk
- Nottinghamshire and Nottingham
- Oxfordshire
- Staffordshire and Stoke-on-Trent
- Suffolk
- Surrey
- Warwickshire
- West Sussex
- Worcestershire

=== Devolution for further areas ===
Devolution in England was expanded to newly created CAs and CCAs.

- Devon and Torbay Combined County Authority (non mayoral)
- Greater Lincolnshire Combined County Authority
- Hull and East Yorkshire Combined Authority
- Lancashire Combined County Authority (non mayoral)

Six areas were accepted onto the Devolution Priority Programme, which also included local government reorganisation and (in four areas) delayed elections:

- Cheshire and Warrington Combined Authority
- Cumbria Combined Authority
- Greater Essex Combined County Authority
- Hampshire and the Solent Combined County Authority
- Norfolk and Suffolk Combined County Authority
- Sussex and Brighton Combined County Authority

== Provisions ==
The bill was introduced on 10 July 2025 by Angela Rayner, Secretary of State for Housing, Communities and Local Government. It was also renamed, taking on the title of English Devolution and Community Empowerment Bill. According to The Observer newspaper, the legislation is "steeped in the ideology of the Co-operative Party".

=== Strategic authorities ===
The act establishes strategic authorities as single foundation strategic authorities, combined authorities, combined county authorities and the Greater London Authority.

The act sets out what "areas of competence" strategic authorities are responsible for.

The act allows for the creation of single strategic foundation authorities.

The act allows for combined authority decision making to be made on the basis of a simple majority.

Combined authority mayors can appoint commissioners.

The act establishes scrutiny committees to oversee combined authority mayors.

The act enables all combined authorities to make use of Council Tax precepts.

Mayors are prohibited from taking seats in the House of Commons, the Scottish Parliament, Senedd Cymru and the Northern Ireland Assembly. Previously this only applied to mayors with police and crime commissioner functions such as the Mayor of Greater Manchester.

=== Functions of strategic authorities and mayors ===
The act established a general power of competence for strategic authorities. The act allows mayors to convene meetings with "local partners". The act places a duty on mayors to collaborate with each other.

The act establishes a regulatory framework for micromobility schemes, to be used by Transport for London and other transport authorities. Transport for London is enabled to dispose of land without the consent of the government. Strategic authorities are enabled by the act to establish key network road maps.

The act confers adult education functions on combined authorities to:

- secure appropriate facilities for the education and training of adults over the age of 19
- secure appropriate facilities for adults who lack certain skills to obtain relevant qualifications
- ensure certain individuals who are not required to pay tuition fees for their legal entitlements to specific qualifications

Mayors can intervene in planning applications of potential strategic importance. Combined authority mayors are enabled to make development orders in the same way as the Mayor of London. The act enables mayors to raise a mayoral community infrastructure levy. The act transfers the existing powers held by Homes England and local authorities to combined authorities and combined county authorities. The act confers the existing housing and land function on local authorities onto combined authorities and combined county authorities. Mayors are enabled to establish mayoral development corporations.

Combined authorities and combined county authorities are required to assess economic conditions in their areas, exercising this power jointly with the unitary authorities and county councils in their areas, who already had this responsibility. Combined authorities and combined county authorities are enabled to pay grants to their constituent authorities. Combined authorities are enabled to make "local growth plans" with the goal of improving economic growth in their area. Combined authorities are required to cooperate with the relevant local government pension scheme.

The act places a duty on mayors to address health inequalities and to improve the health of individuals in their area.

The act simplifies the procedure for transferring police and crime commissioner functions to mayors. Alongside this, the government announced that police and crime commissioners would be abolished at the end of the term ending in 2028. Their functions would be transferred to councillors in places without a mayor. The act also simplifies the procedure for transferring fire and rescue authority functions to combined authorities and combined county authorities.

When a combined authority or combined county authority is a fire and rescue authority, its functions are exercised by its mayor and none of its constituent authorities can exercise fire and rescue authority functions.

The act makes combined authorities and combined county authorities relevant authorities for the purposes of the Crime and Disorder Act 1998, which enables police to share information with them.

The act allows the Mayor of London to publish a strategic licensing policy statement which licensing authorities (London boroughs, the City of London, Inner Temple, Middle Temple) must consider when carrying out their licensing functions.

The act requires combined authorities and combined county authorities to encourage and promote visitors to their areas.

The act allows strategic authority mayors a "right to request" additional powers, where the government must issue a response.

The act retains a prohibition on strategic authorities exercising certain functions relating to the health service.

The act allows the government to publish guidance which strategic authorities must follow when exercising their functions.

The act simplifies the procedure for transferring property to a strategic authority.

Secondary legislation cannot remove powers from combined authorities and combined county authorities.

=== Other measures about local authorities and PCCs ===
==== Reorganisation, governance, elections and councillors ====
The act allows the government to restructure local government in two-tier areas into unitary authorities.

The transfer of powers to new shadow local authorities after reorganisation, which means the previous local authorities do not need to consent to the transfer of powers to a combined authority or combined county authority.

The act restricts councils using the committee system for their executive arrangements.

The act required councils to implement effective neighbourhood governance.

The act restores the supplementary vote for police and crime commissioner elections and mayoral elections.

The act ends the publication of councillors' addresses in local authority registers.

==== Other provisions ====
The act establishes London Councils as a statutory joint committee, and enables the government to make grants to it.

The act establishes a community right to buy, and enables councils to designate assets of community value.

The act allows councils to prohibit pavement parking in areas that they designate.

The act enables the government to discharge statutory trusts.

The act allows for the government to establish national standards for the licensing of taxi and private hire vehicles.

The act allows councils to conduct gambling impact assessments when licensing gambling establishments under the Gambling Act 2005.

The act gives national park authorities and the Broads Authority a general power of competence.

=== Local audit ===
The act established the Local Audit Office.

=== Upwards-only rent reviews ===
The act prohibits upwards-only rent reviews in commercial leases.

== Implementation ==
Combined Authorities (Mayoral Elections) (Amendment) Order 2026
- Statutory Instrument
- Parliament of the United Kingdom
- Citation: SI 2026/652
- Territorial extent: England and Wales

Dates
- Made: 17 June 2026
- Laid before Parliament: 21 May 2026
Other legislation
Made under	English Devolution and Community Empowerment Act 2026

Status: Current legislation

The government implemented the Combined Authorities (Mayoral Elections) (Amendment) Order 2026 (SI 2026/652) enabling the reintroduction of the supplementary vote to be in force for strategic authority mayors in time for the 2026 Greater Manchester mayoral by-election.
