= Chris Parry (Royal Navy officer) =

Royal Navy Rear Admiral (born 1953)

Rear Admiral Chris Parry CBE

Chair of the Marine Management Organisation
- In office April 2010 – November 2010
- Preceded by: Office established
- Succeeded by: Derek Langslow (interim)

Personal details
- Born: 29 November 1953 (age 72)
- Party: Reform UK (2025–2026)
- Education: Portsmouth Grammar School; Jesus College, Oxford (MA); University of Reading (PhD)
- Military career
- Allegiance: United Kingdom
- Branch: Royal Navy
- Service years: 1972–2008
- Rank: Rear Admiral
- Commands: Amphibious Task Group; HMS Fearless; HMS Gloucester
- Conflicts: Falklands War
- Awards: Commander of the Order of the British Empire; Mentioned in Despatches

Rear Admiral Christopher John Parry, CBE (born 29 November 1953) is a British retired Royal Navy officer who was the first chair of the British Government's Marine Management Organisation until November 2010.

== Education ==
Parry was educated at Portsmouth Grammar School, Jesus College, Oxford, where he read modern history, and the University of Reading, where his Doctor of Philosophy degree was awarded in 2017 for a thesis titled "Do Norman Dixon's theories about incompetence apply to senior naval commanders?"

== Naval career ==
Parry joined the Royal Navy as a seaman officer in 1972 and then became an observer in the Fleet Air Arm in 1979.

He saw service in the Fleet Carrier HMS Ark Royal as a trainee officer during the course of which he appeared in the BBC fly on the wall documentary, Sailor.

Showing life on board the ship during a February-to-July 1976 Western Atlantic deployment, Parry ostensibly features in the episode "Officer Territory" which details his training with him holding educational English lessons for members of the ship's company in addition to taking his role on the bridge evading a Russian spy ship as well as taking advice on the handling of men from the Fleet Master At Arms.

Parry again features in the penultimate episode of the series, Sailor (Eight Years On) where having transferred to the Fleet Air Arm he gives an account of his role in the attack on the Argentine submarine ARA Santa Fe during the retaking of South Georgia.

In 1982, he was mentioned in despatches for his actions during the Falklands War, his part in rescuing sixteen SAS troopers from Fortuna Glacier in South Georgia and for the detection and disabling of the Argentinian submarine Santa Fe. He believes depth charges he launched were the first "shots" fired in the recapture of the Falklands.

In 1989, he was promoted to commander. He commanded the air defence destroyer HMS Gloucester and the Maritime Warfare Centre. In June 1997, he was promoted to captain and in January 2000 was posted as commanding officer of HMS Fearless. As a commodore, he was Director Operational Capability in the Ministry of Defence (2000–2003) and then Commander Amphibious Task Group from September 2003. He was appointed Commander of the Order of the British Empire (CBE) in the 2004 Birthday Honours. He was promoted to rear admiral in January 2005 when he became Director General, Development, Concepts and Doctrine, a role he held until 2008.

== Post-2008 activities ==
Since June 2008, Parry has worked in the private sector and as a writer, broadcaster and speaker. He served as the first chair of the British Government's Marine Management Organisation from April 2010 to November 2010.

On 12 June 2010, in an interview on BBC Radio 4's Today programme, he described the planning for the UK's 2006 deployment of 3,300 troops to Helmand Province in Afghanistan as flawed, relying too much on lessons from Borneo, Malaya and Northern Ireland. The subsequent BBC News article quotes him as saying that senior commanders had obdurately resisted "ditching the lessons from the past", preferring these to the "radical and progressive ideas" which were needed.

Since 2024, Parry has co-hosted a YouTube series entitled History Undone, providing historical observations and analysis on battles and campaigns and how history may have played out differently including the wider historical and geopolitical consequences that could have resulted.

In December 2025, he was selected as candidate for Reform UK in the 2026 election for mayor of the Hampshire and the Solent Combined Authority. Parry faced calls to resign by the Labour Party after saying the David Lammy (born in London) ought to "go home to the Caribbean", accusing the region as being the place where his "loyalty lies" in response to the issue of reparations. Parry later apologised for the words, saying they were "clumsy", and that the issue was "about reparations" rather than being racially motivated. He was suspended as candidate in March 2026 after comparing members of a Jewish neighbourhood watch group with "Islamists on horseback".

== Works ==
- Parry, Chris (2012). Down South: A Falklands War Diary. Viking. ISBN 978-0241959626.
- Parry, Chris (2014). Super Highway: Sea Power in the 21st Century. Elliott & Thompson. ISBN 978-1908739841.
