= Metropolitan county =

Type of county-level administrative division of England

- Category: Counties
- Location: England
- Found in: Regions
- Created by: Local Government Act 1972
- Created: 1 April 1974
- Number: 6
- Additional status: Ceremonial counties
- Populations: 1.2–2.8 million
- Subdivisions: Metropolitan district

Metropolitan counties are a subdivision of England which were originally used for local government. There are six metropolitan counties: Greater Manchester, Merseyside, South Yorkshire, Tyne and Wear, West Midlands and West Yorkshire.

The metropolitan counties were created in 1974 as part of a reform of local government in England and Wales. They were the top tier of a two-tier system of counties and metropolitan boroughs, and were created to govern large urban areas. In 1986 their county councils were abolished, and since then the metropolitan counties have had no local government role. The local government functions were largely taken over by the metropolitan boroughs, with joint boards created to co-ordinate some county-wide services. The metropolitan counties are all ceremonial counties which share their borders.

All of the metropolitan boroughs belong to combined authorities, which are a type of strategic authority introduced in 2011 that allow local authorities to voluntarily pool responsibilities and collaborate. The combined authorities for Greater Manchester, South Yorkshire, West Midlands and West Yorkshire cover the same areas as the metropolitan counties; the boroughs of Merseyside are part of the Liverpool City Region, and those of Tyne and Wear are part of the North East Mayoral Strategic Authority.

== History ==
=== Creation ===
The idea of creating administrative areas based upon the large conurbations outside London, modelled on the County of London or Greater London, was mooted several times in the 20th century. In 1948, the Local Government Boundary Commission proposed several new counties, including 'South East Lancashire North East Cheshire' ("Selnec"), and 'South West Lancashire North West Cheshire'. In the 1960s the Local Government Commission for England proposed such an arrangement for Tyneside and draft proposals considered it for Selnec. For the West Midlands conurbation, the commission proposed instead a group of contiguous county boroughs with no overall metropolitan authority.

The Redcliffe-Maud Report of 1969 proposed the creation of three large "metropolitan areas" based upon the conurbations surrounding Manchester, Liverpool and Birmingham (Selnec, Merseyside, and West Midlands), which were to have both metropolitan councils covering the entire areas, and district councils covering parts. Harold Wilson's government published a white paper broadly accepting these recommendations, and adding South Yorkshire and West Yorkshire as metropolitan areas.

The proposals were radically altered when Edward Heath's Conservative government came to power in 1970. The Conservatives' local government white paper was published in February 1971, naming the metropolitan areas "metropolitan counties", and giving them as "Merseyside, south-east Lancashire and north-east Cheshire, the West Midlands, West Yorkshire, South Yorkshire, and the Tyne and Wear area".

The proposed counties were also far smaller than in the original proposals; they were trimmed at each successive stage. The Redcliffe-Maud Report had included Chester in Merseyside and Redditch and Stafford in West Midlands. The Conservative policy favoured retaining historic boundaries as far as was practicable, and the new white paper proposals generally reduced the metropolitan counties to the continuously built up area. Many areas on the edges were excluded from the metropolitan counties when the bill was passed: Easington, Harrogate, Knaresborough, Ellesmere Port, Neston, New Mills, Whaley Bridge and Glossop; other areas were excluded during the bill's passage, such as Seaham, Skelmersdale and Holland, Poynton and Wilmslow. One area, the county borough of Southport, was added to Merseyside in the bill, at the local council's request.

Several other proposals for metropolitan counties were made during the bill's passage, including a revival of the proposal for Hampshire (either the southern part or all of it) and central Lancashire. A Thamesside metropolitan county, covering areas of north Kent and south Essex on the Thames Estuary (and now considered part of the Thames Gateway) was also proposed.

The metropolitan counties were created by the Local Government Act 1972. The county councils were first elected in 1973, and were formally established in April 1974.

=== Structure ===
The metropolitan counties were first created with a two-tier structure of local government. Local government functions were divided between the metropolitan district councils as lower tier authorities and metropolitan county councils as the upper tier.

The structure differed from the non-metropolitan counties in the allocation of powers between the county and district councils. The metropolitan districts had more powers than non-metropolitan districts, in that they were additionally responsible for education and social services, responsibilities allocated to county councils elsewhere.

The metropolitan county councils were intended to be strategic authorities that ran regional services such as main roads, public transport, emergency services, civil protection, waste disposal, and strategic town and country planning. The metropolitan county councils functioned between 1974 and 1986.

=== Abolition of the county councils ===
Just a decade after they were established, the mostly Labour-controlled metropolitan county councils (MCCs) and the Greater London Council (GLC) had several high-profile clashes with the Conservative government of Margaret Thatcher about overspending and high rates. Government policy on the issue was considered throughout 1982, and the Conservative Party put a "promise to scrap the metropolitan county councils", and the GLC, in their manifesto for the 1983 general election.

The exact details of the reform caused problems. In October 1983, Thatcher's government published a white paper entitled Streamlining the cities which set out detailed plans for the abolition of the MCCs, together with the abolition of the GLC.

The bill was announced in the Queen's Speech and was introduced into Parliament soon afterwards. It became the Local Government Act 1985; the MCCs and the GLC were abolished at midnight on 31 March 1986.

The last elections to the councils were held in May 1981; elections that would have been held in 1985 were abandoned under the Local Government (Interim Provisions) Act 1984; the original plan had been for councillors' terms to expire in April 1985, and for councillors to be replaced by nominees from borough councils until 1986.

While the abolition of the GLC was highly controversial, the abolition of the MCCs was much less so. The Liberal Party leader David Steel had supported abolition of the MCCs in his 1981 conference speech. The government's stated reasons for the abolition of the MCCs were based on efficiency and their overspending.

However the fact that all of the county councils were controlled by the Labour Party led to accusations that their abolition was motivated by party politics: the general secretary of the National and Local Government Officers' Association described it as a "completely cynical manoeuvre". Merseyside in particular put up a struggle against abolition. Most of the functions of the MCCs passed either to the metropolitan borough councils, or to joint boards. Some assets were given to residuary bodies for disposal. The split of functions from the metropolitan county councils was as follows:

Special joint arrangements	Grants to voluntary bodies, roads and traffic management, waste disposal, airports
Joint boards	Fire, police, public transport
Quangos	Arts, pensions and debt, sport
District councils	Arts, civil defence, planning, trading standards, parks, tourism, archives, industrial assistance, highways

=== Current status ===
Map of the situation in 2023 metropolitan borough London borough or the City of London unitary authority two-tier non-metropolitan county

The metropolitan counties are sometimes referred to as "former metropolitan counties", although this description is not entirely correct. The county councils were abolished, but under the Local Government Act 1972, the counties themselves remain in existence, although they no longer exist in ISO 3166-2:GB as extant administrative subdivisions.

By virtue of the Lieutenancies Act 1997 they remain as ceremonial counties (sometimes called 'geographic counties') which have an appointed Lord Lieutenant. They are also used in certain government statistics, although they no longer appear on Ordnance Survey maps, which show the individual metropolitan boroughs.

Some local services are still run on a metropolitan county-wide basis, administered by statutory joint boards and special joint arrangements; these include policing (by joint police authorities), fire services, public transport (by passenger transport executives) and waste disposal (in Merseyside and Greater Manchester). These joint boards are made up of councillors appointed by the boroughs. Since 2000, the metropolitan counties have been used as the areas of joint local transport plans.

In 1999, following a successful referendum, the Labour government under Tony Blair legislated to create a strategic authority for London (the Greater London Authority). Despite some talk of doing so, no bodies were established to replace the MCCs. The Blair government instead pursued the idea of elected regional assemblies, although after an unsuccessful referendum in the most positive region, the North East, this idea now has few proponents. The idea of city regions has been proposed subsequently, although the 2006 local government white paper had no firm proposals for formal recognition of this concept. This changed in 2010 when the Government accepted a proposal from the Association of Greater Manchester Authorities to establish a Greater Manchester Combined Authority as an indirectly elected, top tier, strategic authority for Greater Manchester. In 2014 similar indirectly elected combined authorities were established for the metropolitan counties of South Yorkshire and West Yorkshire, and two combined authorities were established which each covered a metropolitan county and adjacent non-metropolitan districts: the Liverpool City Region Combined Authority for Merseyside and the Borough of Halton unitary authority, and the North East Combined Authority (2014–2024) for Tyne and Wear and the unitary authorities of County Durham and Northumberland. In 2017 the West Midlands Combined Authority was established for the West Midlands county. Many of these new combined authorities have elected or are in the process of electing authority-wide regional mayors.

Since 1995, the cities of Birmingham, Bristol, Leeds, Liverpool, Manchester, Newcastle, Nottingham and Sheffield have assembled together in the Core Cities Group. This organisation accords no distinct legal status on these councils over any other city council in England but appears to be organically moving towards some kind of recognition of their role as regional capitals outside London.

== List of metropolitan counties ==
Metropolitan counties of England
County	Region	Largest settlement	Metropolitan boroughs
Greater Manchester	North West England	Manchester	Bolton; Bury; Manchester; Oldham; Rochdale; Salford; Stockport; Tameside; Trafford; Wigan
Merseyside	North West England	Liverpool	Knowsley; Liverpool; Sefton; St Helens; Wirral
South Yorkshire	Yorkshire and the Humber	Sheffield	Barnsley; Doncaster; Rotherham; Sheffield
Tyne and Wear	North East England	Newcastle upon Tyne	Gateshead; Newcastle upon Tyne; North Tyneside; South Tyneside; Sunderland
West Midlands	West Midlands	Birmingham	Birmingham; Coventry; Dudley; Sandwell; Solihull; Walsall; Wolverhampton
West Yorkshire	Yorkshire and the Humber	Leeds	Bradford; Calderdale; Kirklees; Leeds; Wakefield

== See also ==
- List of local governments in the United Kingdom
