= Principal area =

Formal legal term for a county in England and Wales

In England and Wales local government legislation, a principal area is one of the sub-national areas established for control by a principal council. They include most of the areas governed by the lowest level of local government above that of Parish or Community council.

== England ==
In England the principal areas are defined by the Local Government Act 1992 as,

- the non-metropolitan counties
- the districts
- the London boroughs

Note that while the local authority bodies of the City of London, Inner Temple, Middle Temple, civil parishes and the Isles of Scilly are not included within this definition, they otherwise remain defined as "local government areas".

While the phrase exists as a specific term in legislation such as the 1992 Act to refer to the geographical area governed by a principal council the usual descriptive title otherwise used for such an area is one of County, Borough, District, City.

== Wales ==
A principal area in Wales is any one of the areas governed by a unit of local government created by the Local Government (Wales) Act 1994 that amended the Local Government Act 1972. The first-named Act allocated the English-language descriptive titles of,

- County or County Borough – one of the subdivisions of Wales

Not all councils include their description as a County or Borough within the name used for normal public presentation, an example being Gwynedd which uses the simple Gwynedd Council and/or Cyngor Gwynedd, typically combined in logos and headings as the bilingual Cyngor Gwynedd Council (with Gwynedd emphasised) until 2022, when it dropped the English name to only use Cyngor Gwynedd universally.

The plural Welsh translation as used in legislation such as Reg. 2 The Local Authorities (Conduct of Referendums) (Wales) Regulations 2004 is Prif Ardaloedd.
