= Local Democracy, Economic Development and Construction Act 2009 =

Act of the Parliament of the United Kingdom

Local Democracy, Economic Development and Construction Act 2009 (Note: Section 150.)
- Act of Parliament
- Parliament of the United Kingdom
- Long title: An Act to make provision for the purposes of promoting public involvement in relation to local authorities and other public authorities; to make provision about bodies representing the interests of tenants; to make provision about local freedoms and honorary titles; to make provision about the procedures of local authorities, their powers relating to insurance and the audit of entities connected with them; to establish the Local Government Boundary Commission for England and to make provision relating to local government boundary and electoral change; to make provision about local and regional development; to amend the law relating to construction contracts; and for connected purposes.
- Citation: 2009 c. 20
- Introduced by: Hazel Blears (Commons); Baroness Andrews (Lords)
- Territorial extent: England and Wales; Scotland (part 8); (Note: Section 147.)

Dates
- Royal assent: 12 November 2009
- Commencement: Various (Note: Section 148.)
Other legislation
| Amends | Local Government Act 1966; Employers' Liability (Compulsory Insurance) Act 1969; House of Commons Disqualification Act 1975; Rent Act 1977; Protection from Eviction Act 1977; Public Passenger Vehicles Act 1981; County Courts Act 1984; Housing Associations Act 1985; Town and Country Planning Act 1990; Access to Justice Act 1999; Political Parties, Elections and Referendums Act 2000; Railways Act 2005; Government of Wales Act 2006; National Health Service Act 2006 |
| Amended by | Co-operative and Community Benefit Societies Act 2014; Cities and Local Government Devolution Act 2016; Policing and Crime Act 2017; Elections Act 2022; English Devolution and Community Empowerment Act 2026 |

Status: Amended

History of passage through Parliament

Text of statute as originally enacted

Revised text of statute as amended

The Local Democracy, Economic Development and Construction Act 2009 (c. 20), or LDEDCA, is an act of the Parliament of the United Kingdom.

The legislation places a duty on local authorities to promote understanding of the functions and democratic arrangements of the authority among local people. It establishes the framework for the establishment and functioning of the local authority leaders' boards that had been set up in the eight English regions outside London.

It allows the creation of appointed combined authorities covering multiple local authority areas. The act requires a combined authority to be made up of at least 2 local authorities,

Part 8 of the act amends part 2 of the Housing Grants, Construction and Regeneration Act 1996 in relation to "construction contracts" entered into after 1 October 2011.

== Provisions ==
Part 3 of the Act provides for the establishment of the Local Government Boundary Commission for England (LGBCE), and for the transfer to it of all the boundary-related functions of the Boundary Committee for England of the Electoral Commission. Part 3 also repeals the parts of the Political Parties, Elections and Referendums Act 2000 which could have transferred the functions of each of the UK boundary commissions to the Electoral Commission.

The act placed a duty on local authorities to promote democracy. The act established the National Tenant Voice.

=== Section 59 ===
The following orders have been made under section 59(1):

- The Cornwall (Electoral Changes) Order 2011 (SI 2011/1)
- The Northumberland (Electoral Changes) Order 2011 (SI 2011/2)
- The Cheshire East (Electoral Changes) Order 2011 (SI 2011/3)
- The Cheshire West and Chester (Electoral Changes) Order 2011 (SI 2011/4)
- The Cumbria (Electoral Changes) Order 2012 (SI 2012/3113)

== Combined authorities ==
Sections 103-107 provide for the Secretary of State to establish combined authorities covering the whole of two or more local government areas in England.

=== Established in 2011 ===
- Greater Manchester Combined Authority was the first combined authority to be established.

=== Established in 2014 ===
- South Yorkshire Mayoral Combined Authority - Barnsley, Doncaster, Rotherham and Sheffield
- Liverpool City Region Combined Authority
- North East Combined Authority - Durham, Gateshead, Newcastle upon Tyne, North Tyneside, Northumberland, South Tyneside and Sunderland
- West Yorkshire Combined Authority

== Part 8 ==
Part 8 relates to construction contracts and in particular:

- fees for adjudication (section 141)
- payment notices and amounts due for payment (sections 142–145).
