= Greater Manchester Combined Authority =

Strategic authority and combined authority in England

- Greater Manchester within England

Type
- Type: Combined authority of Greater Manchester
- Houses: Unicameral
- Term limits: None

History
- Founded: 1 April 2011
- Preceded by: AGMA

Leadership
- Mayor: Bev Craig since 3 August 2026
- Group Chief Executive (interim): Andrew Lightfoot since 24 July 2026
- Deputy Mayor of Greater Manchester: Paul Dennett, Labour since 8 December 2021
- Deputy Mayor for Safer and Stronger Communities: Kate Green, Labour since 9 January 2023
- GMCA Managing Director: Andrew Lightfoot since June 2024
- TfGM Managing Director: Steve Warrener since January 2024
- GMFRS Chief Fire Officer: Dave Russel since September 2020

Structure
- Seats: 11 constituent members
- Graph of the party split among 11 seats.
- Political groups: Labour (10) Liberal Democrats (1)

Elections
- Voting system: Indirect election (10 of 11 seats), directly elected mayor
- First election: 4 May 2017
- Last election: 30 July 2026
- Next election: 4 May 2028

Meeting place
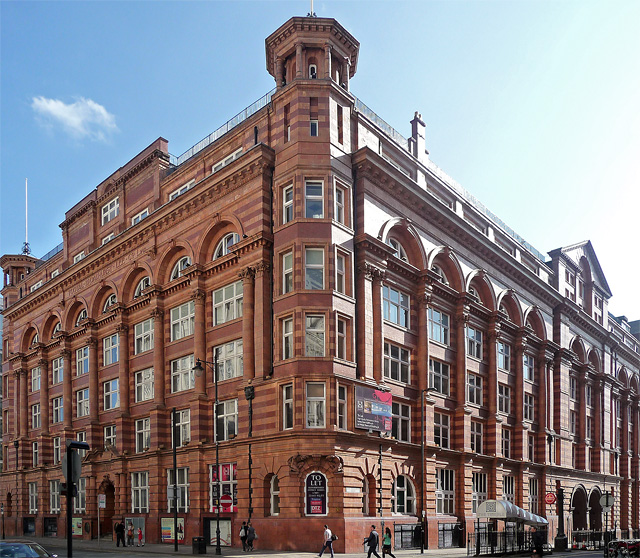
- Tootal Buildings, 56 Oxford Street, Manchester M1 6EU

Website
- www.greatermanchester-ca.gov.uk

The Greater Manchester Combined Authority (GMCA) is the combined authority for Greater Manchester, England. It consists of 11 members: ten indirectly elected members from each constituent council and the directly elected mayor of Greater Manchester. The GMCA is a strategic authority with powers over public transport, skills, housing, regeneration, waste management, carbon neutrality and planning permission.

To guide planning policy in the region, the authority publishes the Greater Manchester Strategy, which was first developed in the 2000s by the Association of Greater Manchester Authorities. Functional executive bodies such as Transport for Greater Manchester deliver some of the GMCA's powers. The GMCA appoints a Chair and Vice-Chairs from among its ten executive members.

The authority was established on 1 April 2011, replacing a range of single-purpose joint boards and quangos. It derives most of its powers from the Local Government Act 2000 and Local Democracy, Economic Development and Construction Act 2009. On its establishment, it was the first formal administrative authority for Greater Manchester since the abolition of Greater Manchester County Council in 1986.

The GMCA is funded by multiple sources. Its transport functions are funded by a precept levy on Council Tax in Greater Manchester; other funding comes from direct government grant or its constituent councils.

== History ==
=== Background ===
Greater Manchester was created as a metropolitan county composed of ten metropolitan boroughs on 1 April 1974 as a result of the Local Government Act 1972. From its investiture through to 31 March 1986, the county had a two-tier system of local government; district councils shared power with Greater Manchester County Council. The county council was abolished in 1986 as a result of the Local Government Act 1985, effectively making the ten metropolitan boroughs unitary authority areas. The Association of Greater Manchester Authorities (AGMA) was established in 1986 as a voluntary association to make representations and bids on behalf of Greater Manchester and continue to manage strategic public services that were delegated to it by the councils, such as public transport and waste management. In the late-2000s, AGMA began actively seeking a formal government structure for Greater Manchester under the appellation Manchester City Region.

=== Development and formation ===
Following a bid from AGMA highlighting the potential benefits in combatting the 2008 financial crisis, it was announced in the 2009 United Kingdom Budget that Greater Manchester and the Leeds City Region would be awarded Statutory City Region Pilot status, allowing (if they desired) for their constituent district councils to pool resources and become statutory combined authorities with powers comparable to the Greater London Authority. The aim of the pilot was to evaluate the contributions to economic growth and sustainable development by combined authorities. The Local Democracy, Economic Development and Construction Act 2009, passed with reference to the 2009 United Kingdom Budget, enabled the creation of a combined authority for Greater Manchester with devolved powers on public transport, skills, housing, regeneration, waste management, carbon neutrality and planning permission, pending approval from the ten, councils.

Between late-2009 and February 2010, AGMA debated the constitution and functions of the new combined authority, including matters such as name, voting system and remit. From February 2010 through to April 2010, the ten metropolitan district councils were consulted for their recommendations before submission of their constitution to central government; changes included extra powers for controlling further education, additional provisions for scrutinising the authority, and swapping the draft name 'Manchester City Region Authority' (MCRA) for the 'Greater Manchester Combined Authority' (GMCA), a name approved by the executive board of AGMA.

Consultations made with district councils in March 2010 recommended that all GMCA matters requiring a vote would be decided on via a majority rule system involving ten members appointed from among the councillors of the ten metropolitan boroughs (one representing each borough of Greater Manchester with each council also nominating one substitute) without the input of the UK's central government. The Transport for Greater Manchester committee would be formed from a pool of 33 councillors allocated by council population, roughly one councillor for every 75,000 residents to scrutinise the running of the Transport for Greater Manchester committee (Manchester has five councillors, Wigan and Stockport four, Bury two and all other boroughs three). The ten district councils of Greater Manchester approved the creation of the GMCA on 29 March 2010, and submitted its final recommendations for its constitution to the Department for Communities and Local Government (DCLG) and the Department for Transport. On 31 March 2010, the then Communities Secretary John Denham approved the constitution and launched a 15-week public consultation on the draft bill together with the approved constitution. The replacement of AGMA by the GMCA, was requested to take place from 1 April 2011.

On 16 November 2010, the DCLG announced that it had accepted the combined authority proposal and that an order to establish the GMCA would be laid before Parliament. The Greater Manchester Combined Authority Order 2011, which formally established the combined authority, was made on 22 March 2011 and came into force on 1 April 2011.

== Schemes and strategies ==
=== Localism Act 2011 ===
Following the passage of the Localism Act 2011 on 15 November 2011, the DCLG began negotiating with groups of local councils for tailored deals to be included in the 2012 United Kingdom budget. The GMCA sought provision for a further transfer of powers that would result in an additional delegation of authority from the UK's central government. This step-change would mean that, instead of the GMCA bidding for government funding on a project-by-project basis, it will receive a sum of money from government ministers and would be able to determine, locally, how it is used. The UK Government is considering a further plan to allow passenger transport executives to raise local rail fares in their areas, and directly invest the money raised in infrastructure and rolling stock alongside the specification of additional or improved rail services.

=== Greater Manchester City Deal ===
A "City Deal" for Greater Manchester was announced in March 2012 by the then Deputy Prime Minister Nick Clegg and Cities Minister Greg Clark. The deal included:

- A "Revolving Infrastructure Fund" allowing the GMCA to earn-back up to £30 million per year against spending on infrastructure projects.
- The formation of a "Greater Manchester Investment Framework" allowing Greater Manchester to make better use of Central Government and EU funding.
- The establishment of a "Greater Manchester Housing Investment Board" to build new housing in the area.
- The creation of a "City Apprenticeship and Skills Hub" to increase the number of apprenticeships available in the area.
- The formation of a "Low Carbon Hub" to integrate multiple carbon reduction measures.

=== Reduced carbon and economic growth ===
In November 2012, the then Energy and Climate Change Secretary Edward Davey MP, signed an agreement between the GMCA and the Department of Energy and Climate Change, in recognition of its deliverance of low carbon initiatives (such as bulk-buying energy from suppliers for consumers in Greater Manchester), and committing the Government to design and deliver new green initiatives in Greater Manchester releasing millions in funding to pioneer new low carbon technologies.

The GMCA was praised in November 2012 as a model for other city regions by Sir Howard Bernstein and Michael Heseltine, for its economic benefits.

=== Planning and housing ===
The GMCA has produced a joint strategic plan for Greater Manchester (excluding Stockport) called Places for Everyone, which includes land allocation for housing, infrastructure and other development. It is the first joint plan of its kind by a city region outside of London.

The original scheme, called the Greater Manchester Spatial Framework, was published in 2016 following public consultations in 2014 and 2015. After Andy Burnham's election as Mayor of Greater Manchester in 2017 the plan underwent a "radical rewrite" with a revised plan being published in 2019. In December 2020 Stockport withdrew from the scheme and the plan was re-scoped and renamed as Places for Everyone.

The plans were submitted to the Secretary of State for Levelling Up, Housing and Communities in 2022, and were the subject of an examination by the Planning Inspectorate during 2022 and 2023. Following the examination, Places for Everyone came in to effect on 21 March 2024 after it was formally adopted by all nine participating districts.

The GMCA also established a housebuilder, Hive Homes, with local housing associations.

=== Transport ===
In May 2012, the GMCA proposed to set up a franchisor body with neighbouring metropolitan authorities in West Yorkshire and South Yorkshire, to take over the Northern and TransPennine Express rail franchises, and, from 2014/15, operate their routes under a single franchise, sharing financial risk and operational responsibilities.

The GMCA lobbied the government for two stations in Manchester on the proposed High Speed 2 railway from London; at Manchester Piccadilly and Manchester Airport.

==== Bee Network ====
In 2020, the GMCA and TfGM set out the Transport Strategy 2040, which lays out the city region's ambitions for transport and active travel, including the hope that by 2040, 50% of all journeys made in Greater Manchester, should be made by walking, cycling and public transport.

In 2023, GMCA and TfGM started the process of re-regulating the bus network, capping the fare price for a single journey and starting to bring routes under the jurisdiction of TfGM in three 'tranches'. This process completed on 5 January 2025, with all bus routes falling under TfGM's control. This was followed by the introduction of a London-style tap-and-go payment system on 23 March and an announcement of plans to bring eight commuter rail lines and 64 railway stations into the Bee Network by 2028.

=== Integrated Settlement ===
In March 2023, the GMCA agreed a significant "trailblazer" devolution deal with the UK Government, securing new responsibilities over transport, housing, and regeneration. As part of this deal, it was agreed that Greater Manchester would be granted a single funding settlement, similar to that of Scotland and Wales. The single settlement will cover the entire Spending Review period and be agreed directly through a single process with the government. It will increase GMCA’s autonomy, ability to prioritise decisions locally, and ability to reprioritise across its own budgets and will be structured around responsibility and accountability for five functions: local growth and place, local transport, housing and regeneration, adult skills and buildings’ retrofit for decarbonisation.

Implemented in April 2025, the Greater Manchester Combined Authority will receive £630,876,501 in the financial year 2025/26 through the integrated settlement, split across the five functions and guided by an outcomes framework, which sets out targets for the combined authority based on the functional areas of financial settlement. Funding for future years is anticipated to be set out in the Chancellor's Spending Review.

== Mayor of Greater Manchester ==
In November 2014, it was announced that Greater Manchester, along with several other city regions, would elect a 'metro-mayor' with similar powers to the Mayor of London. In May 2015 an interim mayor was appointed by GMCA: there were two candidates for this post; Peter Smith, leader of Wigan Borough Council and incumbent chairman of the Greater Manchester Combined Authority and Tony Lloyd, the Greater Manchester Police and Crime Commissioner. Tony Lloyd was selected to be interim mayor on 29 May 2015. The first Greater Manchester mayoral election was held on 4 May 2017. Andy Burnham was elected as the inaugural Mayor of Greater Manchester. The mayor is a member of the Mayoral Council for England and the Council of the Nations and Regions.

== Organisation ==
=== Greater Manchester Combined Authority ===
The GMCA is made up of 11 constituent members - the mayor of Greater Manchester together with one councillor appointed by each of Greater Manchester's ten local authorities. Each member has one vote and each council also appoints one substitute member in the case of absence. The appointing council may at any time terminate the membership of its appointee, and the appointee will also cease to be a member if they cease to be an elected representative. The Mayor is the GMCA's chairperson, and a member of the second and third largest political groups on the authority, if applicable, are automatically appointed as vice-chairs.

Most questions arising before the GMCA are decided by a simple majority vote, and if a vote is tied it is considered to be lost. The chairperson does not have a casting vote. However, several subjects require an enhanced majority of eight votes in favour. These are:

- The adoption of a sustainable community strategy (known as the Greater Manchester Strategy),
- Approval of new schemes to be financed by the Greater Manchester Transport Fund
- The approval of the local economic assessment
- The GMCA's annual budget
- The approval of borrowing limits, the treasury management strategy, the investment strategy and the capital budget
- The setting of the transport levy
- The acceptance of any proposed delegation of functions and budgets to the GMCA
- The amendment of the GMCA's rules of procedure
- The approval of the mayor's transport policy
- The approval of the mayor's local transport plan
- Such other plans and strategies as are determined by the GMCA

Any question relating to road user charging require a unanimous vote in favour by all 11 members.

=== Transport for Greater Manchester ===
Transport for Greater Manchester (TfGM) is the executive body of the GMCA for the execution of transport functions and is the executive agency responsible for the running of Greater Manchester's transport services and infrastructure such as Metrolink, subsidised bus and rail services as well as carrying out transport and environmental planning. The organisation carries out the previous functions of the Greater Manchester Passenger Transport Executive (GMPTE). The organisation absorbed the previously separate ITA Policy Unit, the GM Joint Transport Unit, the GMTU and GMUTC. It is supervised by the members of the Bee Network Committee.

=== Greater Manchester Fire and Rescue Service ===
The GMCA is the parent organisation of the Greater Manchester Fire and Rescue Service, with the chief fire officer, currently Dave Russel, reporting to the GMCA group chief executive. GMFRS is the statutory emergency fire and rescue service for Greater Manchester and covers an area of 496 square miles (1,280 km^{2}).

=== Bee Network committee ===
The Bee Network committee is a joint committee of the GMCA, mayor of Greater Manchester and the ten Greater Manchester local authorities established to provide oversight of TfGM and create transport policy on behalf of the combined authority. It is named after Greater Manchester's integrated transport network, the Bee Network.

The committee has four key responsibilities: Decision-making over significant operational matters across the network, monitoring the performance and financial stability of the network, developing policy to support the local transport plan, and facilitating coordination between the ten local authorities around highways maintenance and infrastructure delivery.

Each local authority appoints one of its executive members with responsibility for transport matters to sit alongside the mayor, a member of the GMCA, and up to four other councillors appointed by the mayor. These additional mayoral appointees allow the committee's political make-up to reflect the political make-up of Greater Manchester's councils as a whole.

=== Joint Overview and Scrutiny Committee ===
A Joint Overview and Scrutiny Committee (JOSC) provides scrutiny of the combined authority, Bee Network Committee, TfGM and CNE, each constituent council appoints three of its elected members to JOSC and sub committees can be formed to examine specific issues.

=== Greater Manchester Business Board ===
The Greater Manchester Business Board provides an independent business voice to support the combined authority the delivery of its economic priorities. The board consists of four members of the GMCA and up to fifteen members from the private sector. The chair has the right to attend and speak at meetings of the combined authority, but does not receive a vote.

The Business Board was previously known as the Greater Manchester Local Enterprise Partnership, which operated independently from the GMCA until April 2024 when it was integrated into the combined authority.

=== Cabinet ===
The GMCA is made up of 11 constituent members: the elected Mayor of Greater Manchester and ten members who are elected councillors, nominated by each of Greater Manchester's constituent authorities. The mayor is also supported by a non-constituent Deputy Mayor for Policing and Crime – the only salaried portfolio holder. In most cases, each council's nominee is the leader of the council, although there is no requirement for them to be so; for example, between 2018 and 2020, Peter Smith, Lord Smith of Leigh, continued to serve as Wigan Council's representative on the combined authority despite having retired as leader of the council.

As of September 2026, the composition of the cabinet is as follows:

Name	Position within nominating authority	Nominating authority	Portfolio
Bev Craig	Mayor of Greater Manchester	Directly elected	Policy and Reform, Transport, and Healthy Lives
Kate Green	Deputy Mayor	Appointed by the mayor (Note: Under the Police Reform and Social Responsibility Act 2011, as modified by the Greater Manchester Combined Authority (Transfer of Police and Crime Commissioner Functions to the Mayor) Order 2017, and the Greater Manchester Combined Authority (Fire and Rescue Functions) Order 2017 as amended by The Greater Manchester Combined Authority (Fire and Rescue Functions) (Amendment) Order 2020.)	Deputy Mayor, Safer and Stronger Communities
Akhtar Zaman	Leader	Bolton Council	Digital City-Region
Eamonn O'Brien	Leader	Bury Council	Technical Education and Skills
Garry Bridges	Leader	Manchester City Council	Economy, Good Growth & Business
		Oldham Council	
Neil Emmott	Leader	Rochdale Borough Council	Culture
Paul Dennett	Mayor of Salford	Salford City Council	Deputy Mayor, Housing First
Mark Roberts	Leader	Stockport Council	Children and Young People
Eleanor Wills	Leader	Tameside Council	Anti-Poverty, Equalities and Communities
Tom Ross	Leader	Trafford Council	Transport, Clean Air and Green City-Region
Nazia Rehman	Leader	Wigan Council	Resources and Investment

Colour key (for political parties): Labour Liberal Democrats
