= Hampshire and the Solent Combined County Authority =

Strategic authority and combined county authority in England

- Logo

- Area covered by the Hampshire and the Solent Combined Authority

Type
- Type: Combined county authority and strategic authority

History
- Founded: 4 June 2026

Leadership
- Chair of the HSCCA Board: Nick Adams-King, Conservative since 13 July 2026

Elections
- Voting system: Directly elected strategic authority mayor
- Next election: 2028 Hampshire and the Solent mayoral election

Meeting place
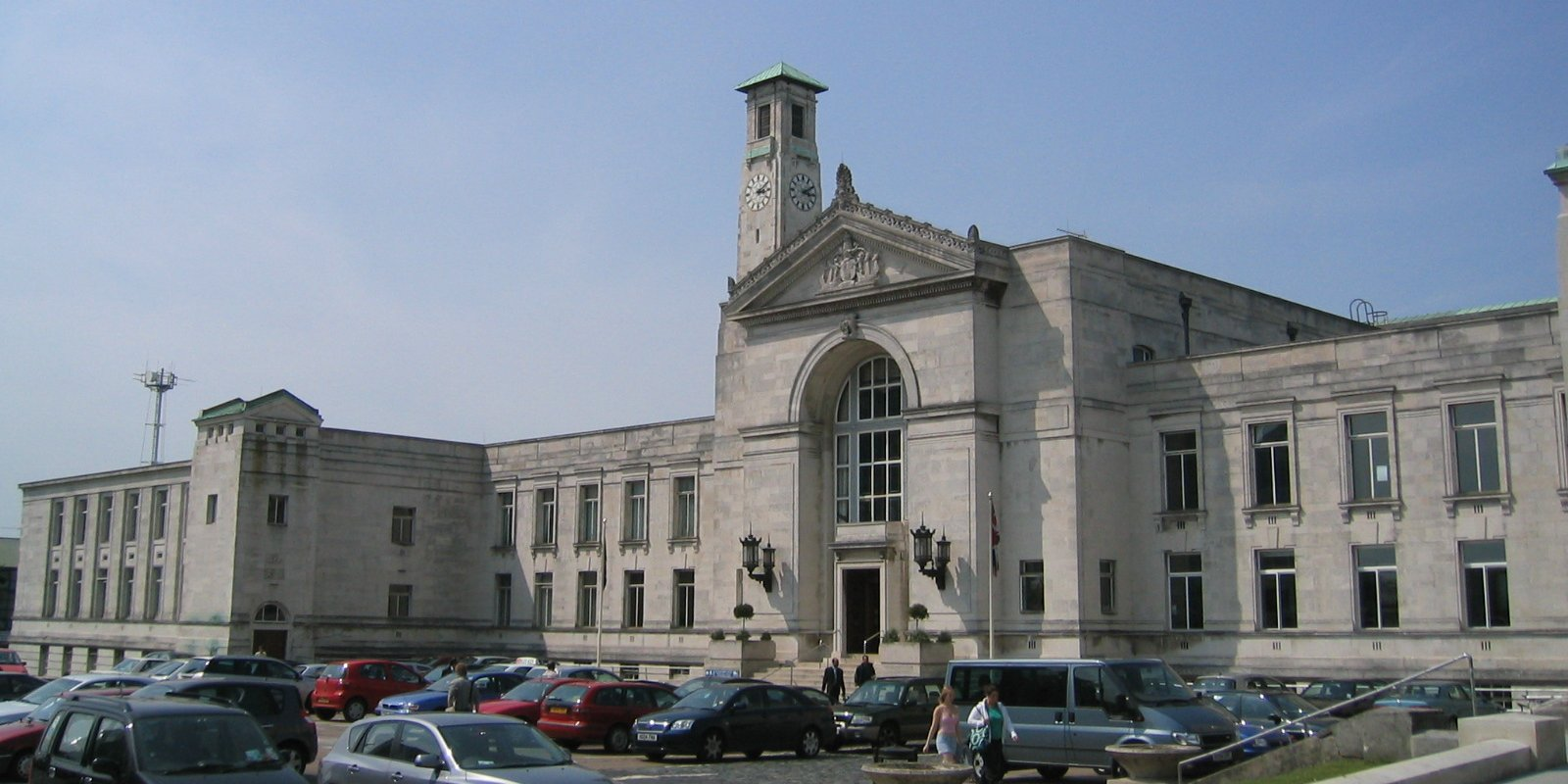
- Civic Centre, Civic Centre Road, Southampton, SO14 7LY

Website
- https://hantsandsolent-ca.gov.uk/

The Hampshire and the Solent Combined County Authority (HSCCA) is a strategic authority and combined county authority for the ceremonial counties of Hampshire and the Isle of Wight in the south of England that was established on 4 June 2026. Its creation is linked to the English Devolution and Community Empowerment Act 2026, first outlined in a white paper in 2024 by the Starmer ministry. HSCCA will have a directly elected mayor, with the first mayoral election scheduled for May 2028.

== Establishment ==
The Isle of Wight was historically part of Hampshire. It became an administrative county in 1890, and a ceremonial county in 1974 when it gained its own Lord Lieutenant.

Previous plans in Hampshire have included a Solent Combined Authority in South Hampshire (potentially alongside the Isle of Wight) and a "Heart of Hampshire" deal including the remainder of the county. However, these plans were rejected in the south due to objections from Isle of Wight Council, and in the north of the county due to disagreements and the likelihood of the constituent authorities being reorganised. A Dorset combined authority was proposed by the county's former nine constituent councils, and was being considered by the two unitary councils (Dorset and Bournemouth, Christchurch and Poole) which replaced them in April 2019. In 2021 a new plan including Hampshire, Isle of Wight, and Bournemouth Christchurch and Poole was being pursued, though lacking appetite for a mayor.

In February 2025, the government announced that six areas had been selected to join the Devolution Priority Programme, which would include the establishment of mayoral combined authorities and combined county authorities in each area and local government reorganisation, if necessary, to remove two-tier local government. In these areas, the councils involved were asked to submit final proposals for reorganisation at the end of September 2025.

Hampshire County Council, Portsmouth and Southampton city councils, and the cabinet of the Isle of Wight Council voted in favour of bringing forward the proposal. Bournemouth, Christchurch and Poole Council considered joining Hampshire and the Solent, but ultimately voted in favour of joining Dorset, Somerset and Wiltshire in the Heart of Wessex proposal.

The formation of a mayoral combined authority for Hampshire and the Solent was agreed by the UK government in February 2025. The inaugural election was initially due to be held in May 2026 but in December 2025 the election, alongside those for three other new mayoral combined authorities, was delayed until 2028.

The combined county authority was established by a statutory instrument which came into force on 4 June 2026.

== Mayor of Hampshire and the Solent ==
The first Mayor of Hampshire and the Solent was initially due to be elected in 2026; in December 2025, it was announced that the election would take place in 2028. The mayor will be a member of the Mayoral Council for England and the Council of the Nations and Regions.

== Membership ==
=== Constituent local authorities ===
Initial constituent membership:

- Hampshire County Council
- Isle of Wight Council
- Portsmouth City Council
- Southampton City Council

=== Board members ===
The combined county authority board consists of the following representatives. The five constituent board members nominate a chair from amongst themselves until the first mayor is elected in May 2028. The inaugural meeting in July 2026 saw the first board members appointed.

Name	Membership	Nominating authority
Vacant until May 2028	Mayor of Hampshire and the Solent, constituent	Direct election
Nick Adams-King	Constituent; Chair	Hampshire County Council
George Madgwick	Constituent	Hampshire County Council
Jonathan Bacon	Constituent; Vice Chair	Isle of Wight Council
Steve Pitt	Constituent	Portsmouth City Council
Sarah Bogle	Constituent	Southampton City Council
