= Principal council =

Legal local government term used in England & Wales

A principal council is a local government authority carrying out statutory duties in a principal area in England and Wales.

The term "principal council" was first defined in the Local Government Act 1972, Section 270. This act created great reforms in local government in England and Wales, partially implementing the recommendations of the Redcliffe-Maud Report and greatly reducing the number of councils with significant powers, especially the number of rural and urban districts.

In England the principal councils are now defined by the Local Government Act 1992 as non-metropolitan counties, districts, and London boroughs. They do not include the Corporation of London, the Council of the Isles of Scilly, or the parish councils.

In Wales a principal council is now one of the unitary authorities created by the Local Government (Wales) Act 1994, referred to collectively as the County and County Borough Councils, although some of them do not include those terms in their names. The definition does not include the community councils, which have a mainly consultative role.
