= Devon and Torbay Combined County Authority =

Strategic authority and combined county authority in England

- The combined county authority area within England

Type
- Type: Combined county authority of Devon

History
- Founded: 5 February 2025

Leadership
- Chair: David Thomas, Conservative since 19 March 2025
- Vice-chair: Julian Brazil, Liberal Democrat since 29 May 2025

Structure
- Seats: 12 members
- Political groups: Constituent members Liberal Democrats (3) Conservatives (2) Reform UK (1) Non-constituent members Conservatives (1) Labour (1) Vacant (2) Associate members Non-political (2)
- Committees: Governance and Audit; Overview and Scrutiny
- Joint committees: Team Devon Joint Committee

Elections
- Voting system: Indirect election
- Last election: 19 March 2025

Meeting place
- Various locations in Devon

Website
- www.devonandtorbay-cca.gov.uk

Constitution
- Devon and Torbay Combined County Authority Constitution

The Devon and Torbay Combined County Authority (DTCCA) is a non-mayoral combined county authority covering most of the ceremonial county of Devon.

== History ==
Following the Local Government Act 1972 which introduced a uniform national system of "two-tier" local government, the entirety of Devon was governed by Devon County Council and a set of non-metropolitan districts. This changed when in 1998, Plymouth and Torbay were separated from the county council to become unitary authorities.

In early 2022, Devon, Plymouth and Torbay were selected as one of nine pilot areas in England by the UK government in the Levelling Up White Paper for "County Deal" negotiations. However, Plymouth City Council decided to withdraw from the deal in November 2023.

Devon and Torbay proceeded without Plymouth with a joint proposal for a Level 2 Devolution Deal, a Combined Authority without a directly elected mayor. The deal was approved by both Devon County Council and Torbay Council and submitted to the Secretary of State for approval in early May 2024. Proposals for a non-mayoral combined county authority were approved by the new Labour government on 19 September 2024 and the authority was formally launched on 5 February 2025. There are provisions to expand the membership should Plymouth City Council join the DTCCA in the future, and in February 2025 Plymouth, Devon and Torbay Councils agreed to explore the creation of a Mayoral Authority, which would supersede the non-mayoral Combined County Authority.

== Membership ==
There are 12 members: 6 constituent members with full voting rights, 4 non-constituent members who do not have voting powers unless extended to them by the constituent members, and 2 associate members who cannot vote under any circumstance.

The six constituent members are chosen by Devon County Council and Torbay Council, who will each choose half. Two of the non-constituent members are selected collectively by the various district councils of Devon to represent their interests, and one is reserved for the Devon and Cornwall Police and Crime Commissioner. The remaining non-constituent member and the two associate members are elected by the constituent members of the DTCCA.

The composition as of 29 May 2025 was as follows:

| Name | Membership | Nominating authority |
|---|---|---|
| Julian Brazil (Vice Chair) | Constituent | Devon County Council |
| Paul Arnott | Constituent | Devon County Council |
| Michael Fife Cook | Constituent | Devon County Council |
| David Thomas (Chair) | Constituent | Torbay Council |
| Chris Lewis | Constituent | Torbay Council |
| Swithin Long | Constituent | Torbay Council |
| Phil Bialyk | Non-constituent | District Councils of Devon |
| Vacant | Non-constituent | District Councils of Devon |
| Alison Hernandez | Non-constituent | Devon and Cornwall Police and Crime Commissioner |
| Vacant | Non-constituent | Devon and Torbay Combined County Authority |
| Alan Dykes | Associate | Business Advisory Group |
| Laurence Frewin | Associate | Skills and Employment Advisory Group |
