= Ryedale District Council elections =

Local government elections in North Yorkshire, England

Ryedale District Council in North Yorkshire, England was established in 1974 and abolished in 2023. It was elected every four years. Since the last boundary changes in 2003, 30 councillors were elected from 20 wards.

== Political control ==
The first election to the council was held in 1973, initially operating as a shadow authority alongside the outgoing authorities until it came into its powers on 1 April 1974. Political control from 1974 until its abolition in 2023 was as follows:

Party in control	Years
Independent	1973–1987
No overall control	1987–1995
Liberal Democrats	1995–1999
No overall control	1999–2011
Conservative	2011–2017
No overall control	2017–2023

=== Leadership ===
Ryedale operated on a committee system, and decided at each annual meeting whether to appoint a leader of the council that year or not. When no leader was appointed, political leadership was exercised by the chair of the policy and resources committee; the role of chair of the council was largely ceremonial. From 2007 until the abolition of the council in 2023, the leaders, or chairs of the policy and resources committee when there was no leader, were:

Councillor	Party	From	To	Title
Keith Knaggs	Conservative	2007	December 2012	Leader
Linda Cowling	Conservative	10 January 2013	18 May 2017	Leader
Luke Ives	Conservative	18 May 2017	May 2019	Chair of policy and resources committee
Keane Duncan	Conservative	16 May 2019	25 February 2021	Leader
John Clark	Liberal	18 March 2021	11 August 2021	Chair of policy and resources committee
Dinah (Di) Keal	Liberal Democrats	9 September 2021	31 March 2023	Chair of policy and resources committee

== Council elections ==
- 1973 Ryedale District Council election
- 1976 Ryedale District Council election
- 1979 Ryedale District Council election
- 1983 Ryedale District Council election (New ward boundaries)
- 1987 Ryedale District Council election
- 1991 Ryedale District Council election
- 1995 Ryedale District Council election
- 1999 Ryedale District Council election
- 2003 Ryedale District Council election (New ward boundaries increased the number of seats by 7)
- 2007 Ryedale District Council election
- 2011 Ryedale District Council election
- 2015 Ryedale District Council election
- 2019 Ryedale District Council election

== Council composition ==
Year	Conservative	Liberal Democrats	Liberal	Independent	Council control after election
2003	13	8	2	7	No overall control
2007	14	8	1 (Note: Only 1 candidate nominated for the 2-seat ward of Pickering East. The Liberal Party won the subsequent by-election held on 21 June 2007.)	6	No overall control
2011	20	2	4	4	Conservative
2015	20	2	3	5	Conservative
2019	12	2	5	11	No overall control

== Results maps ==
2003 results map

2007 results map

2011 results map

2015 results map

2019 results map

== By-election results ==
=== 2003–2007 ===
Sheriff Hutton By-Election 18 September 2003
Party	Candidate	Votes	%	±%
Independent		439	77.2	−7.2
Conservative		130	22.8	+7.2
Majority		309	54.4	
Turnout		569	41.5	
Independent hold		Swing		

Wolds By-Election 15 July 2004
Party	Candidate	Votes	%	±%
Conservative		232	55.9	
Liberal Democrats	Mike Beckett	183	44.1	
Majority		49	11.8	
Turnout		415	31.9	
Conservative hold		Swing		

=== 2007–2011 ===
Pickering East By-Election 21 June 2007
Party	Candidate	Votes	%	±%
Liberal	Thomas Woodward	577	53.7	+53.7
Conservative	Ena Dent	313	29.1	+4.7
Independent	Juliet Hepworth	185	17.2	−15.7
Majority		264	24.6	
Turnout		1,075	40.3	
Liberal gain from Independent		Swing		

Sheriff Hutton By-Election 16 August 2007
Party	Candidate	Votes	%	±%
Conservative	Eric Hope	348	53.8	+2.5
Independent	Gillian Stilwell	299	46.2	−2.5
Majority		49	7.6	
Turnout		647	46.9	
Conservative hold		Swing		

Pickering East By-Election 8 October 2009
Party	Candidate	Votes	%	±%
Liberal	Sue Cowan	392	42.8	
Liberal Democrats	Charles Downes	274	29.9	
Independent	William Oxley	213	23.3	
Independent	Ann Hopkinson	37	4.0	
Majority		118	12.9	
Turnout		916	34.3	
Liberal gain from Liberal Democrats		Swing		

Norton West By-Election 6 May 2010
Party	Candidate	Votes	%	±%
Liberal Democrats	Hugh Spencer	579	50.7	
Conservative	Judith Denniss	455	39.9	
BNP	Trevor Moss	107	9.4	
Majority		124	10.8	
Turnout		1141		
Liberal Democrats gain from Independent		Swing		

=== 2015–2019 ===
Derwent By-Election 17 December 2015
Party	Candidate	Votes	%	±%
Liberal	Mike Potter	283	35	
Conservative	Kerry Ennis	278	35	
Independent	Stephen Shaw	124	16	
Independent	Darren Allanson	81	10	
Yorkshire	Tobias Barran	32	4	
Majority		5	0	
Turnout		798		
Liberal gain from Conservative		Swing		

=== 2019–2023 ===
Cropton By-Election 18 November 2021
Party	Candidate	Votes	%	±%
Liberal	Alasdair Clark	202	39.6	−15.5
Conservative	Greg White	155	30.4	+10.9
Green	Richard McLane	121	23.7	+23.7
Labour	Jill Wells	32	6.3	6.3
Majority		47	9.2	
Turnout		510		
Liberal hold		Swing		
