= York and North Yorkshire =

Strategic authority area in England

- Strategic authority area
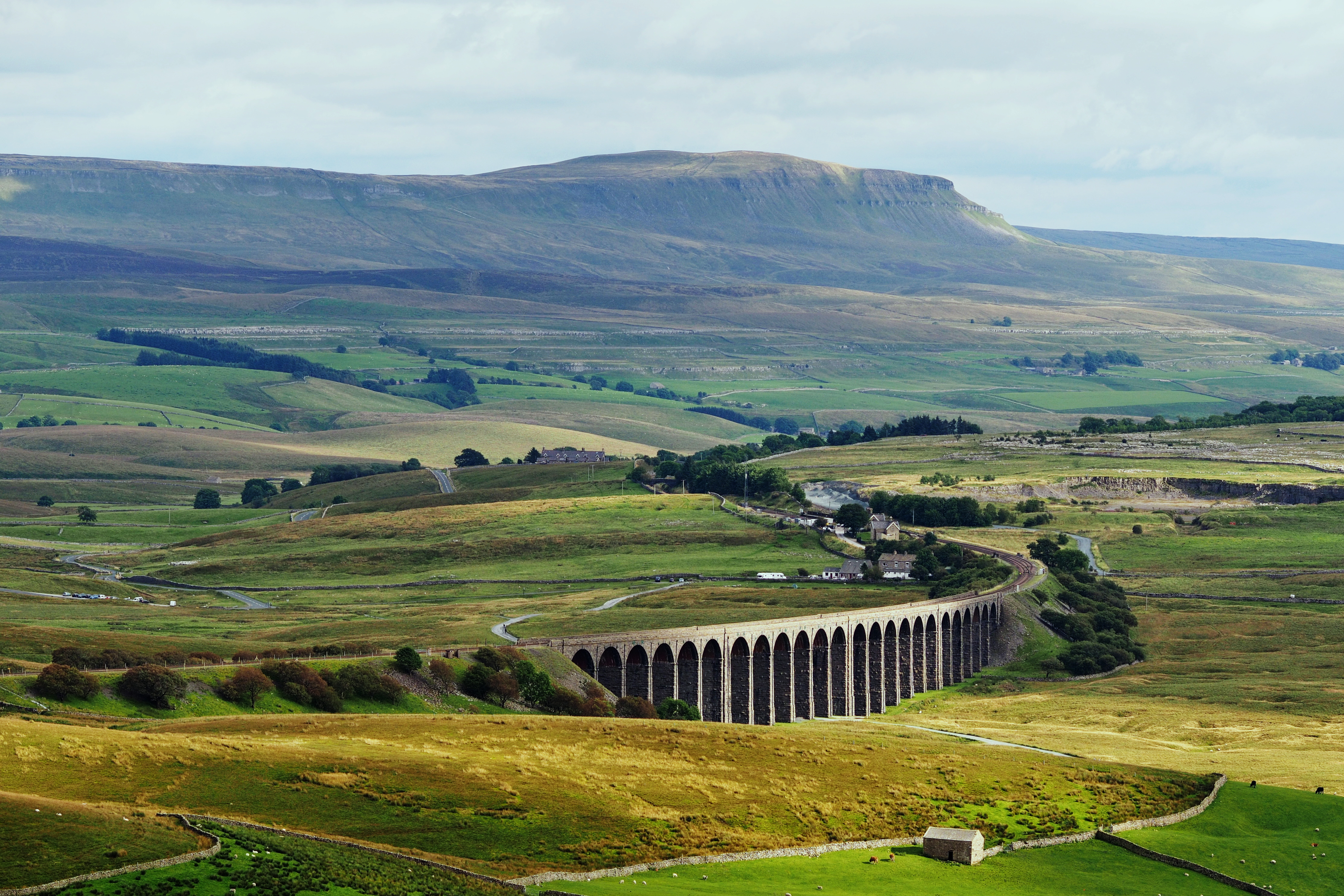
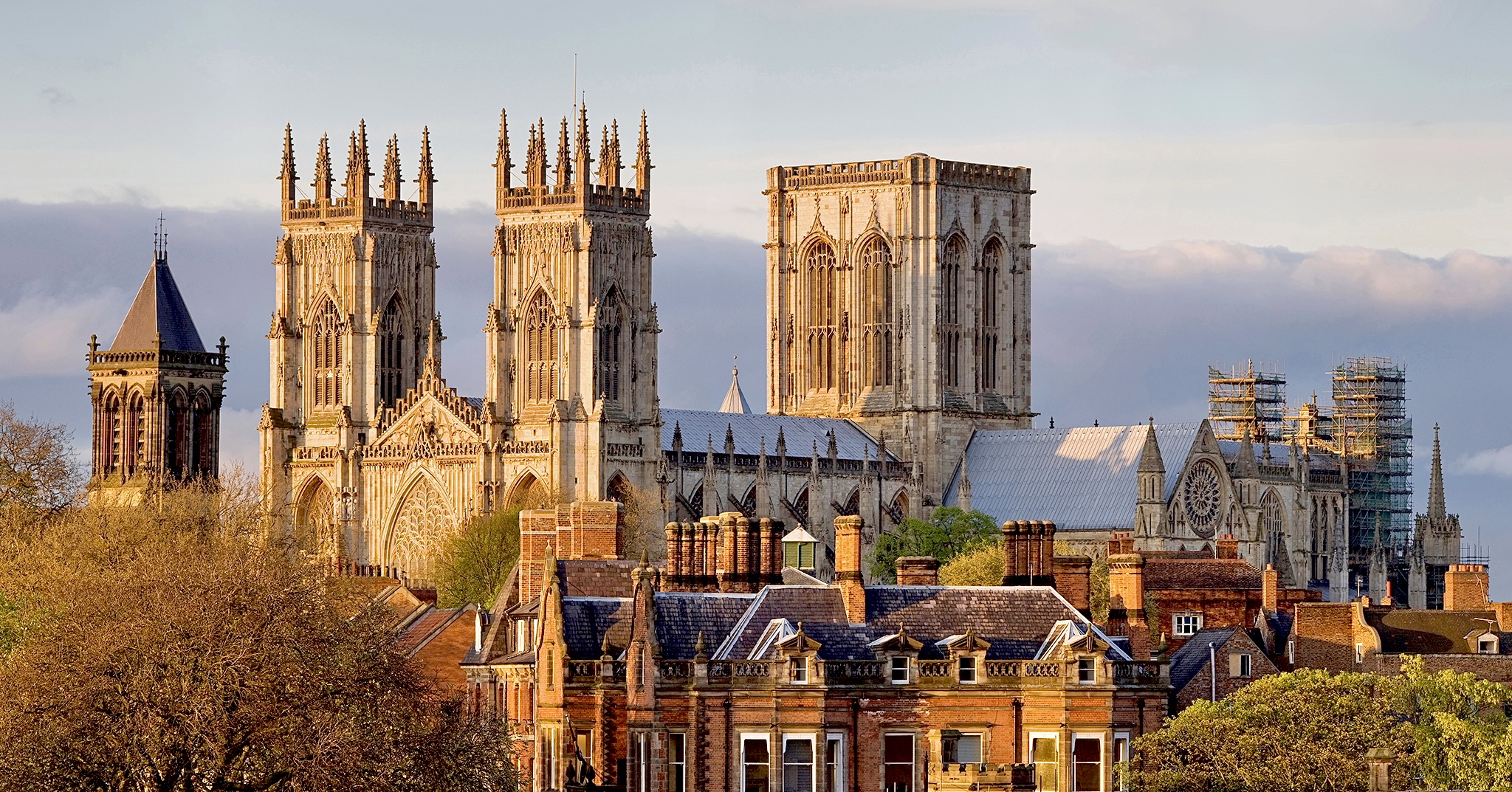
- Top: Ribblehead Viaduct in the Yorkshire Dales; Bottom: York Minster in York

- York and North Yorkshire shown within England
- Coordinates: 54.16°N 1.33°W
- Sovereign state: United Kingdom
- Country: England
- Established: 20 December 2023
- Administrative HQ: County Hall, Northallerton
- Local authorities: List: York; North Yorkshire

Government
  - Type: Strategic authority
  - Body: York and North Yorkshire Combined Authority
  - Mayor: David Skaith (Labour Co-op)

Area
  - Land: 3,208 sq mi (8,309 km^{2})

Population (2025)
  - Total: 848,251
  - Rank: 17th of 20
  - Density: 260/sq mi (102/km^{2})
- Time zone: UTC+0 (GMT)
  - Summer (DST): UTC+1 (BST)
- Postcode areas: YO; BD; DL; HG; LA; TS
- GSS code: E47000012
- Website: yorknorthyorks-ca.gov.uk

York and North Yorkshire is a strategic authority area in England.. It has two council unitary authority areas: North Yorkshire and York. It had a population of 848,251 in 2025. Its largest settlement is York and administrative HQ is Northallerton.

The Mayor of York and North Yorkshire and York and North Yorkshire Combined Authority (EMCCA) have a devolution deal which was established on 20 December 2023.

== History ==
The Local Democracy, Economic Development and Construction Act 2009 provided the basis for the creation of combined authorities, a form of strategic authority.

Discussion of a devolution deal involving North Yorkshire County Council and the City of York council authorities began in 2022, although with some concerns from York that the mayoralty would be dominated by North Yorkshire. A deal for a York and North Yorkshire Combined Authority and Mayor of York and North Yorkshire between the UK government and the two councils was struck on 1 August 2022.

Legislation to establish the authority, encompassing the unitary authority areas of York and North Yorkshire, was made on 19 December 2023. The combined authority assumed its powers on 20 December 2023 and held its first meeting on 22 January 2024. It held a launch event on 1 February 2024.

The first mayor of York and North Yorkshire, David Skaith, was elected in the 2024 York and North Yorkshire mayoral election in May 2024. The mayor is a member of the Mayoral Council for England and the Council of the Nations and Regions.

== Governance ==
=== Combined authority ===
As of June 2026, the board of the East Midlands Combined County Authority comprises:

Name	Membership	Position within nominating authority	Nominating authority
David Skaith	Constituent	Mayor of York and North Yorkshire	Direct election
Carl Les	Constituent	Leader of the Council	North Yorkshire Council
Claire Douglas	Constituent	Leader of the Council	City of York Council
Gareth Dadd	Constituent	Deputy Leader of the Council	North Yorkshire Council
Robert Webb	Constituent	Deputy Leader of the Council	City of York Council

=== Mayor of York and North Yorkshire ===
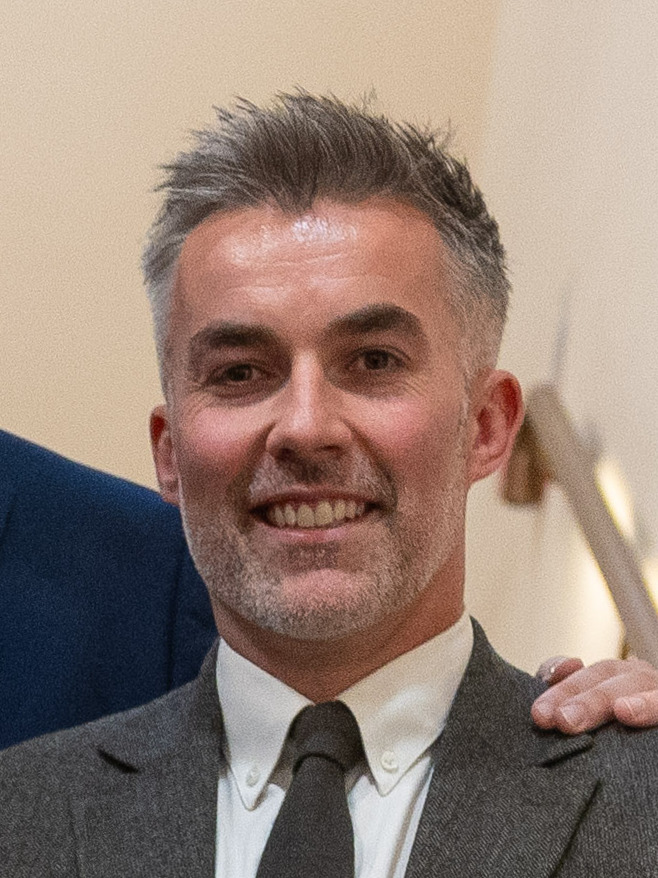
Mayor of York and North Yorkshire David Skaith (Labour Co-op)

In 2016 the Cities and Local Government Devolution Act 2016 provided the provisions for combined authorities to establish directly elected mayors to lead their respective regions. The first mayor, David Skaith, was elected on 2 May 2024 in the 2024 East Midlands mayoral election.

=== Members of Parliament ===
Constituency	Local authority	Member of Parliament	Political party
Harrogate and Knaresborough	North Yorkshire	Tom Gordon	Liberal Democrats
Richmond and Northallerton	North Yorkshire	Rishi Sunak	Conservative Party
Scarborough and Whitby	North Yorkshire	Alison Hume	Labour Party
Selby	North Yorkshire	Keir Mather	Labour Party
Skipton and Ripon	North Yorkshire	Julian Smith	Conservative Party
Thirsk and Malton	North Yorkshire	Kevin Hollinrake	Conservative Party
Wetherby and Easingwold	North Yorkshire	Alec Shelbrooke	Conservative Party
York Central	York	Rachael Maskell	Labour Party
York Outer	York	Luke Charters	Labour Party

== Demography ==
=== Population ===
The area had a population of 848,251 in 2025.

== See also ==
- 2024 York and North Yorkshire mayoral election
