= National Economic Council (United Kingdom) =

Intergovernmental body in the United Kingdom

- Formation: July 2026; 4 months ago
- Region served: United Kingdom
- Field: Intergovernmental relations in the United Kingdom, economic policy
- Chair: Rotates between members

The National Economic Council is a quasi-intergovernmental relations body established in 2026 by the Burnham ministry.

A cabinet commitee of the same name was first created in 2008 by the Brown ministry, but this was discontinued by the Cameron–Clegg coalition following the 2010 United Kingdom general election.

Following his appointment as Prime Minister, Andy Burnham established a new body of the same name in July 2026. Its first meeting in the same month was between the UK Government and the strategic authority mayors in England. The next meeting in October 2026 was between the UK Government and the first ministers of Scotland and Wales.

== History ==
The National Economic Council was a cabinet committee in the UK Government created in 2008 by the Brown ministry, replacing the Economic Development Committee. It was not continued by the Cameron-Clegg coalition.

In its interaction as a cabinet committee, its purpose was to respond to the 2008 financial crisis, acting as the UK's "economic war council".

The first meeting in its iteration as an intergovernmental relations body took place at Number 10 North on 24 July 2026 brought together UK government ministers and strategic authority mayors of England. In August 2026, it was announced that next council would be between the first ministers of Scotland and Wales and the first and deputy first ministers of Northern Ireland. The meeting between the leaders of the devolved nations and the UK government was held in Glasgow on 30 October 2026, but the first minister and deputy first minister of Northern Ireland could not attend after the Democratic Unionist Party confirmed deputy first minister Emma Little-Pengelly would not attend, and no permission was given by the party for First Minister Michelle O'Neill to attend alone.

== Members ==
The members of the council are:

Name	Authority	Position within authority
Andy Burnham (Chair)	Government of the United Kingdom	Prime Minister of the United Kingdom; Minister for the Union; Minister for the Civil Service
Louise Haigh	Government of the United Kingdom	First Secretary of State; Chancellor of the Duchy of Lancaster; Minister for the Cabinet Office
John Healey	Government of the United Kingdom	Chancellor of the Exchequer
Devolved nations
John Swinney	Scottish Government	First Minister of Scotland
Rhun ap Iorwerth	Welsh Government	First Minister of Wales
Michelle O'Neill	Northern Ireland Executive	First Minister of Northern Ireland
Emma Little-Pengelly	Northern Ireland Executive	Deputy First Minister of Northern Ireland
English mayors
The Lord Khan of Tooting	Greater London Authority	Mayor of London
Paul Bristow	Cambridgeshire and Peterborough Combined Authority	Mayor of Cambridgeshire and Peterborough
Claire Ward	East Midlands Combined County Authority	Mayor of the East Midlands
Andrea Jenkyns	Greater Lincolnshire Combined Authority	Mayor of Greater Lincolnshire
Bev Craig	Greater Manchester Combined Authority	Mayor of Greater Manchester
Luke Campbell	Hull and East Yorkshire Combined Authority	Mayor of Hull and East Yorkshire
Steve Rotheram	Liverpool City Region Combined Authority	Mayor of the Liverpool City Region
Kim McGuinness	North East Combined Authority	Mayor of the North East
Oliver Coppard	South Yorkshire Mayoral Combined Authority	Mayor of South Yorkshire
The Lord Houchen of High Leven	Tees Valley Combined Authority	Mayor of the Tees Valley
Richard Parker	West Midlands Combined Authority	Mayor of the West Midlands
Helen Godwin	West of England Combined Authority	Mayor of the West of England
Tracy Brabin	West Yorkshire Combined Authority	Mayor of West Yorkshire
David Skaith	York and North Yorkshire Combined Authority	Mayor of York and North Yorkshire

== Meetings ==
Meetings of the National Economic Council
Date	Location	Chair	Members present
24 July 2026	Number 10 North, Manchester	Andy Burnham	English mayors
30 October 2026	Glasgow	Andy Burnham	Devolved nations (except Northern Ireland)

== See also ==
- Intergovernmental relations in the United Kingdom
