= Mayoral Council for England =

English forum of ministers and mayors

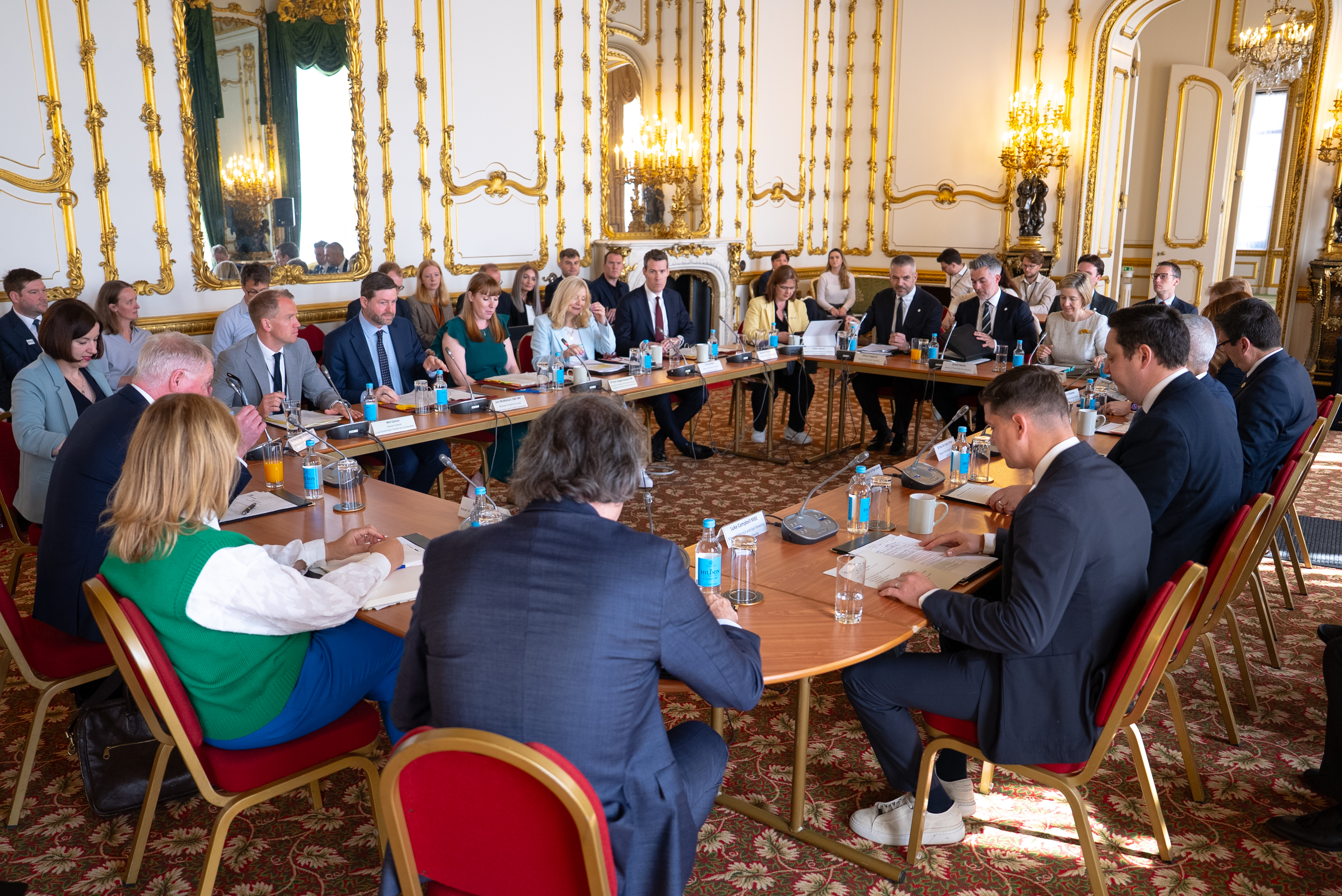
- Meeting of the Mayoral Council in London, 23 May 2025
- Formation: 10 October 2024; 2 years ago
- Region served: England
- Field: Coordination between UK government ministers and strategic authority mayors in England
- Chair: Angela Rayner

The Mayoral Council for England is a forum for UK government ministers and England's strategic authority mayors.

== Purpose ==
The English Devolution White Paper published in December 2024, stated that the functions and aims of the Mayoral Council are as follows:

"The Council will be the key forum for engagement between central government and Mayors on Local Growth Plans, pushing the frontier on devolution, feeding back on how best to deliver on the ground, and identifying opportunities to better coordinate national and local policy."

== Membership ==
At establishment in October 2024, 48% of the population and 26% of the land area of England was represented on the council. This increased to more than half of the population of England following mayoral elections in Greater Lincolnshire and Hull and East Yorkshire in May 2025.

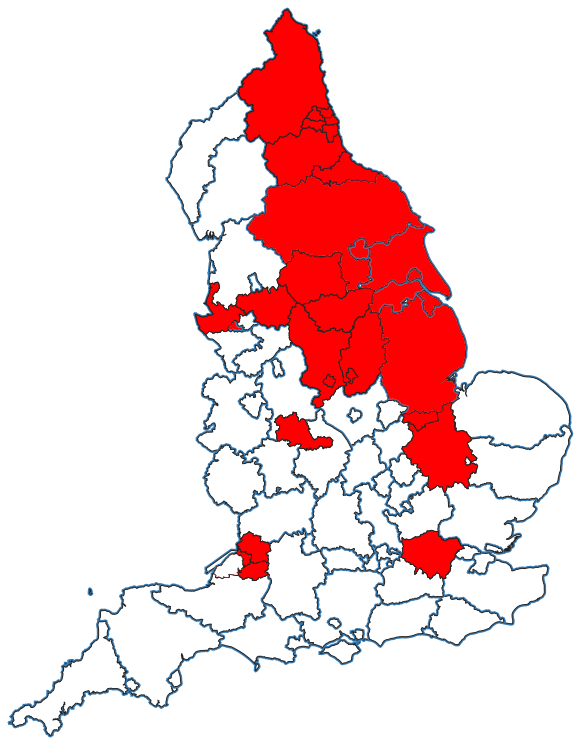
Areas of England represented on the Mayoral Council are shown in red

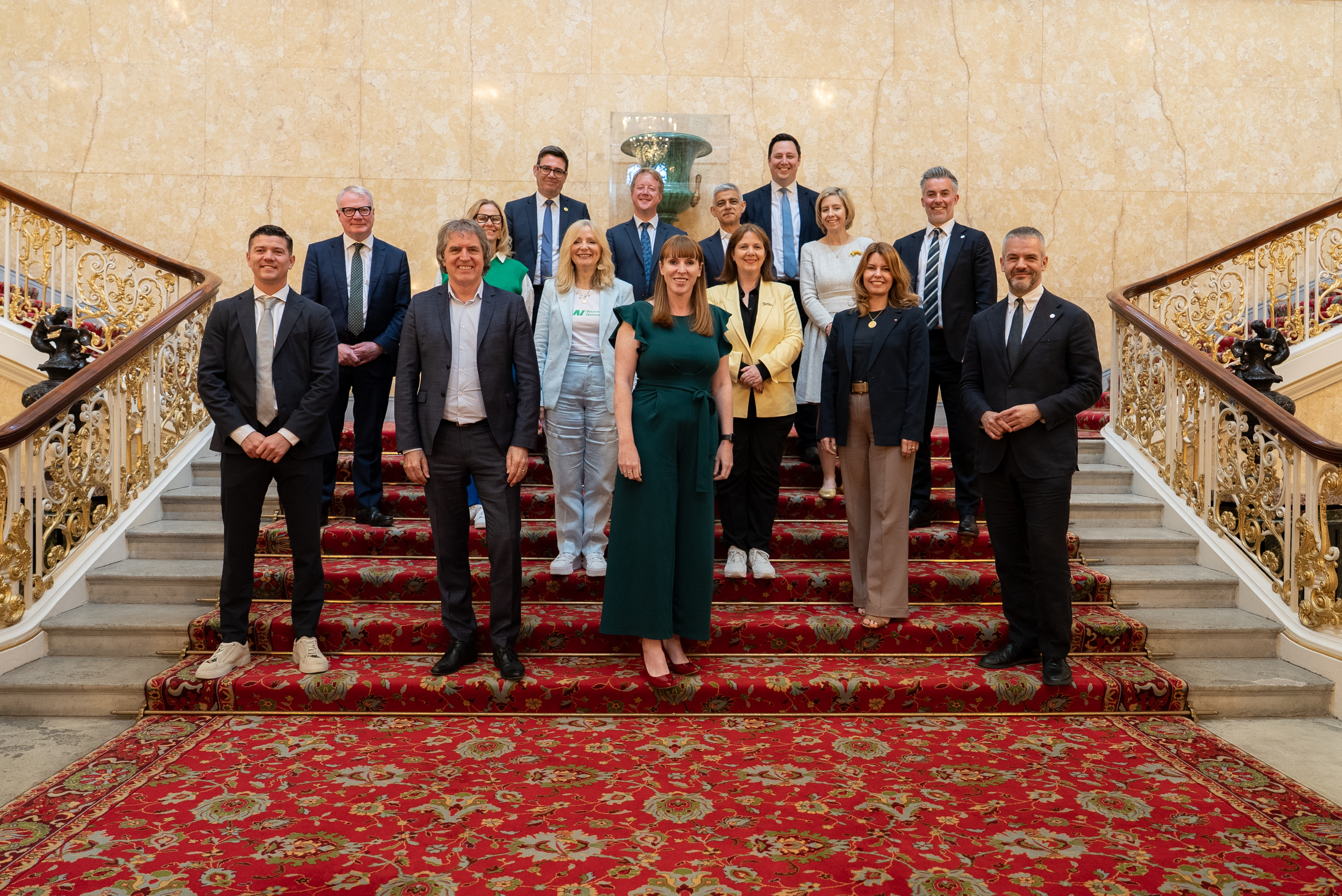
Council members in May 2025

The membership of the Mayoral Council is as follows:

| Name | Authority | Position within authority |
|---|---|---|
| Angela Rayner | Government of the United Kingdom | Secretary of State for Housing, Communities and Local Government |
| Jim McMahon | Government of the United Kingdom | Minister for Local Government, Devolution and Regional Growth |
| The Lord Khan of Tooting | Greater London Authority | Mayor of London |
| Paul Bristow | Cambridgeshire and Peterborough Combined Authority | Mayor of Cambridgeshire and Peterborough |
| Claire Ward | East Midlands Combined County Authority | Mayor of the East Midlands |
| Andrea Jenkyns | Greater Lincolnshire Combined County Authority | Mayor of Greater Lincolnshire |
| Bev Craig | Greater Manchester Combined Authority | Mayor of Greater Manchester |
| Luke Campbell | Hull and East Yorkshire Combined Authority | Mayor of Hull and East Yorkshire |
| Steve Rotheram | Liverpool City Region Combined Authority | Mayor of the Liverpool City Region |
| Kim McGuinness | North East Mayoral Strategic Authority | Mayor of the North East |
| Oliver Coppard | South Yorkshire Mayoral Combined Authority | Mayor of South Yorkshire |
| The Lord Houchen of High Leven | Tees Valley Combined Authority | Mayor of the Tees Valley |
| Richard Parker | West Midlands Combined Authority | Mayor of the West Midlands |
| Helen Godwin | West of England Combined Authority | Mayor of the West of England |
| Tracy Brabin | West Yorkshire Combined Authority | Mayor of West Yorkshire |
| David Skaith | York and North Yorkshire Combined Authority | Mayor of York and North Yorkshire |

The membership of the council will increase as new strategic authority mayoralties are created. As of June 2026, new strategic authorities have been established in Cheshire and Warrington, Cumbria, Sussex and Brighton, and Hampshire and the Solent. Mayors of these new strategic authorities are scheduled to be elected in 2027 or 2028.

== Meetings ==
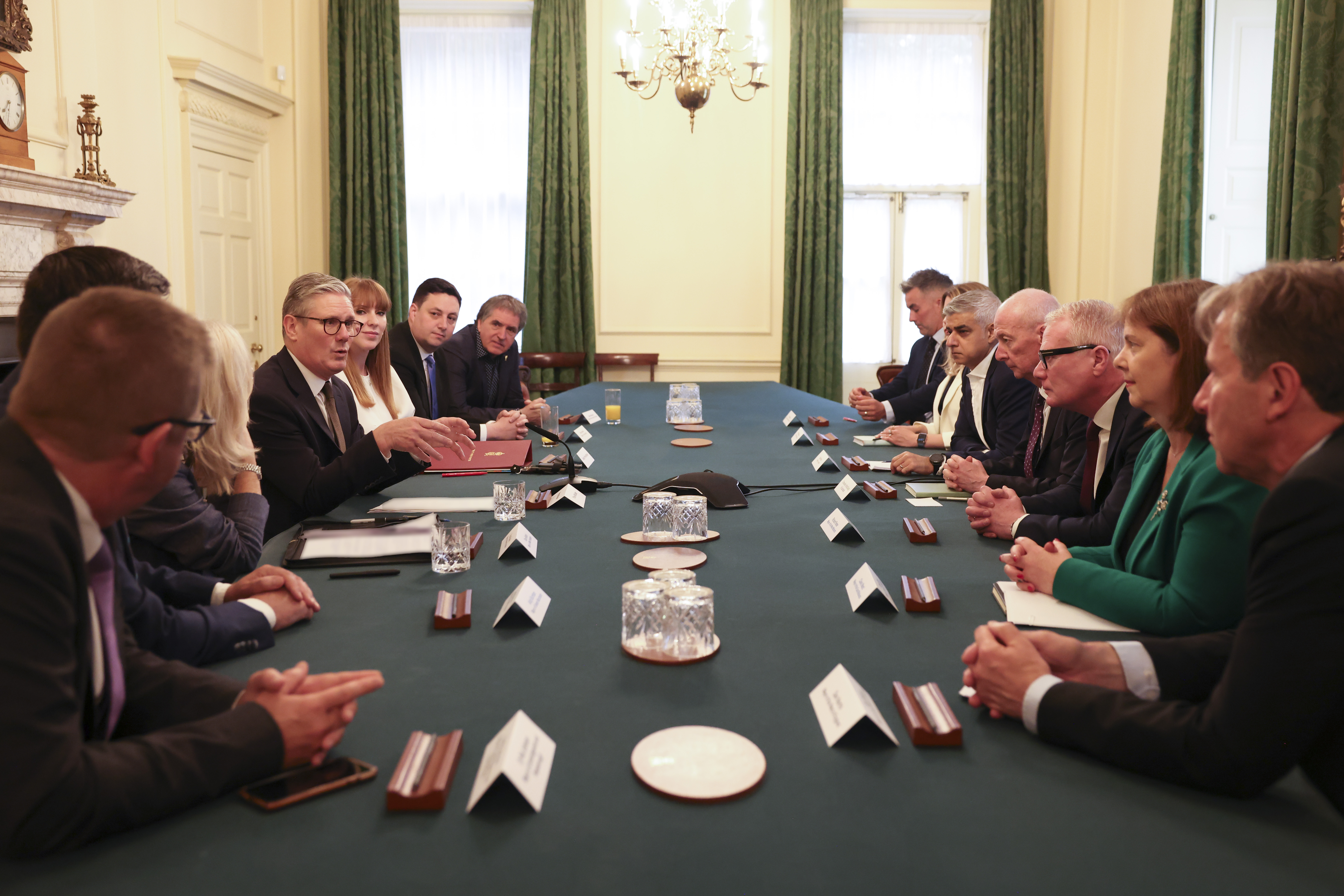
Unofficial meeting of Mayors in July 2024

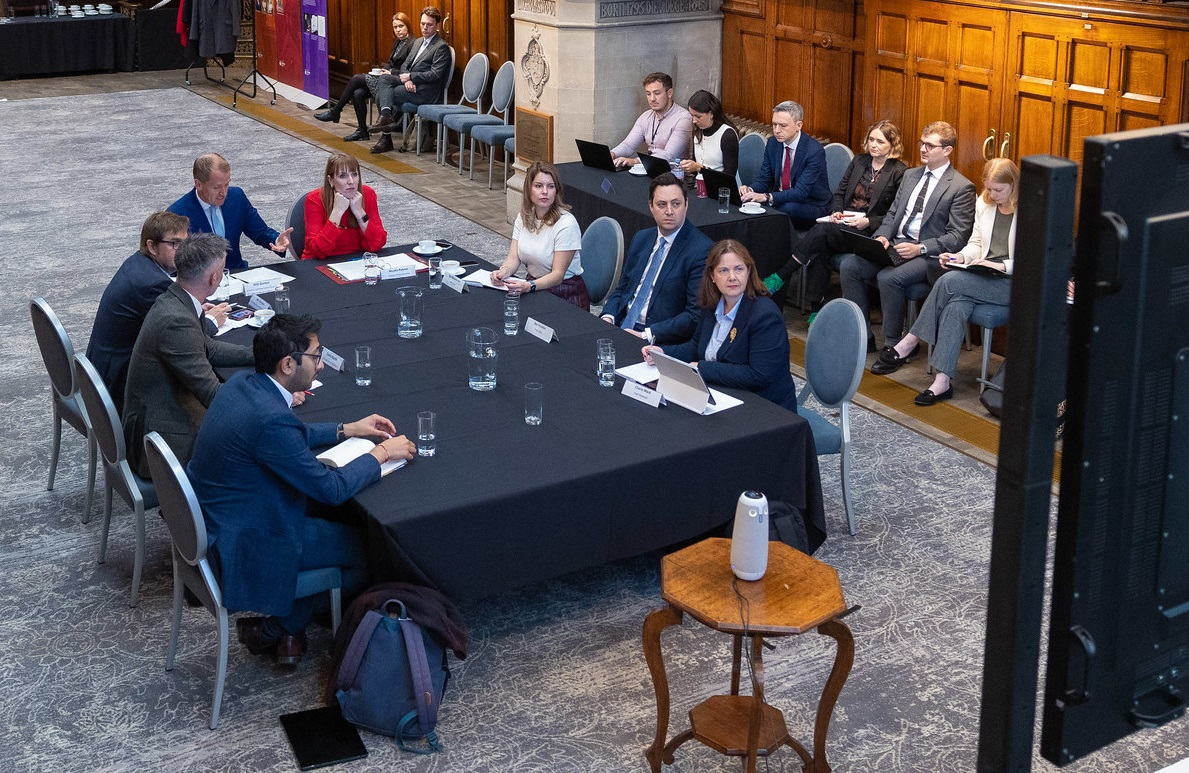
First official meeting of the Mayoral Council in Newcastle-upon-Tyne, 10 October 2024

An unofficial meeting of mayors was held in July 2024 and the first formal meeting of the council took place in October 2024. The council meets up to four times a year.

Meetings of the Mayoral Council for England
| Date | Location | Chair |
|---|---|---|
| 9 July 2024 (unofficial) | 10 Downing Street, London | Keir Starmer |
| 10 October 2024 | The Common Room, Newcastle-upon-Tyne | Angela Rayner |
| 23 January 2025 | Advanced Manufacturing Park, Rotherham | Angela Rayner |
| 23 May 2025 | Lancaster House, London | Angela Rayner |
| 4 September 2025 | Chatsworth House, Bakewell | Angela Rayner |
| 19 March 2026 | Bristol and Bath Science Park, South Gloucestershire | Steve Reed |
| 4 June 2026 | National STEM Learning Centre, University of York; York | Steve Reed |
| 10 September 2026 | Number 10 North, Manchester | Angela Rayner |

== History ==
=== Background ===
==== David Cameron's proposed English Cabinet of Mayors ====
UK prime minister David Cameron proposed in 2012 that England's directly elected local authority mayors sit within an "English Cabinet of Mayors", giving them the opportunity to share ideas and represent their areas at English national level. This proposed cabinet of mayors would have been chaired by the prime minister and meet at least twice a year. However, following the 2012 English mayoral referendums, no action was taken to form such a body.

==== Proposed English Leaders' Forum ====
An "English Leader's Forum" was proposed by a report titled "Intergovernmental Relations in the UK: Time for a Radical Overhaul?" published in The Political Quarterly in 2020. The English Leaders' Forum would bring together combined authority mayors and local government representatives and would focus on matters relevant to English sub-national government, such as regional funding, further devolution of powers, and the regulation of the internal market in areas where devolution has taken place. The report also proposed the creation of the position of "Minister for England" with responsibility for representing English interests within intergovernmental bodies.

==== Gordon Brown's proposed Council of England ====
Plans for a "Council of England" featured in a 2022 Labour Party report on constitutional reform by Gordon Brown titled A New Britain: Renewing our Democracy and Rebuilding our Economy. The proposed council would be chaired by the prime minister and would include leaders of combined authorities, the mayor of London, representatives of English local government and other stakeholders. Earlier, Labour's manifesto for the 2017 general election included a commitment to establish the post of a "Minister for England" within the Department of Communities and Local Government.

==== Dunlop Review's proposed English Regions Forum ====
The 2021 The Dunlop Review into UK Government Union Capability suggested that consideration could be given to establishing an "English Regions Forum" to "feed views in from sub-national governments in England to UK Government ministers".

==== Electoral Reform Society's proposed English Leaders' Forum ====
A 2022 report by the Electoral Reform Society suggested the establishment of an "English Leaders' Forum" to bring together UK ministers with combined authority mayors, single local authority mayors and council leaders. It also suggested the creation of an "England Office" to act as a representative for English local government to the UK government and serve to coordinate between central and local government on English devolved matters.

==== Onward's proposed National Mayors Association ====
Conservative leaning think tank Onward proposed the formation of a National Mayors Association and creation of various Joint Delivery Taskforces involving the UK central government, metro mayors and local authorities in a report titled Give Back Control published in 2022.

==== Institute for Government and Bennett Institute's proposed English Devolution Council ====
In a report titled Devolving English Government published in April 2023, to counter what they described as over-centralisation and a democratic deficit in England, the Institute for Government and the University of Cambridge's Bennett Institute for Public Policy proposed the formation of an "English Devolution Council", and the establishment of an "Office for England" led by a "Secretary of State for England". Under the proposals the English Devolution Council would include the mayor of London and existing combined authority mayors. An interim mechanism would be put in place for the participation of local leaders in areas of England without a mayoral combined authority. The role of the council would be to debate issues related to local and regional governance in England, to call ministers and experts to provide evidence and to advise the UK central Government on English affairs. The Existing Ministry for Housing, Communities and Local Government would be split into a Department for Housing and Communities and an Office for England, which would take on responsibility for oversight of devolved and local governance in England. The Secretary of State for England would chair a cabinet committee for England including other secretaries of state from departments whose remits mainly apply to England only.

=== Establishment ===
Following Labour's victory in the 2024 United Kingdom general election, the new prime minister Keir Starmer informally met the directly elected mayors of London, the combined authorities and combined county authorities on 9 July. The first formal meeting of the Mayoral Council for England, chaired by the Secretary of State for Housing, Communities and Local Government, Angela Rayner, took place on 10 October 2024 in Newcastle-upon-Tyne and the council is expected to meet on a quarterly basis. The Ministry of Housing, Communities and Local Government said it set up the Mayoral Council to "strengthen the relationships between central government and the mayors" ahead of publishing a white paper on devolution. The first meeting of the Council of the Nations and Regions, which also included these mayors took place the following day.

Unlike the proposed "Council of England", the Mayoral Council does not include local government representatives or other stakeholders to represent areas without a strategic authority mayor. At the 2024 Labour Party Conference, government ministers reiterated their commitment to English devolution, saying that all areas of England "should eventually be covered by mayoral devolution", which would mean that the Mayoral Council would eventually evolve into an all-England forum.

In February 2026, English Liberal Democrat peer Lord Wallace of Saltaire proposed an amendment to the English Devolution and Community Empowerment Bill that would have enshrined the Mayoral Council for England in law.

A report published by the Re:State think tank in July 2026 recommended transforming the Mayoral Council into a "Council of Strategic Authorities" chaired by the prime minister or a minister in charge of the new Number 10 North.

==== Ministerial responsibility ====
Meetings of the Mayoral Council for England were chaired by the Secretary of State for Housing, Communities and Local Government. A junior minister for English Devolution was also first appointed in July 2024. In July 2026, prime minister Andy Burnham transferred responsibility for English devolution from the Ministry of Housing, Communities and Local Government to the newly established Number 10 North in Manchester.

==== Mayoral Data Council ====
A Mayoral Data Council was outlined in the English Devolution White Paper and was established in November 2024. Katherine Fairclough, Chief Executive of the Liverpool City Region Mayoral Strategic Authority, was appointed chair of the Mayoral Data Council in February 2026.

==== Virtual Situation Room ====
On 21 August 2026, prime minister Andy Burnham held the first online meeting with England's strategic authority mayors via a "Virtual Situation Room" at Number 10 North.

== See also ==
- Strategic authority
- National Economic Council (United Kingdom)
- Council of the Nations and Regions
- Leaders' Council (United Kingdom)
- Governance of England
- Politics of England
- Devolved English parliament
- Council of the North (1484–1641)
- Council of the West (1539–1540)
