= Council of the Nations and Regions =

Intergovernmental body in the United Kingdom

- Logo

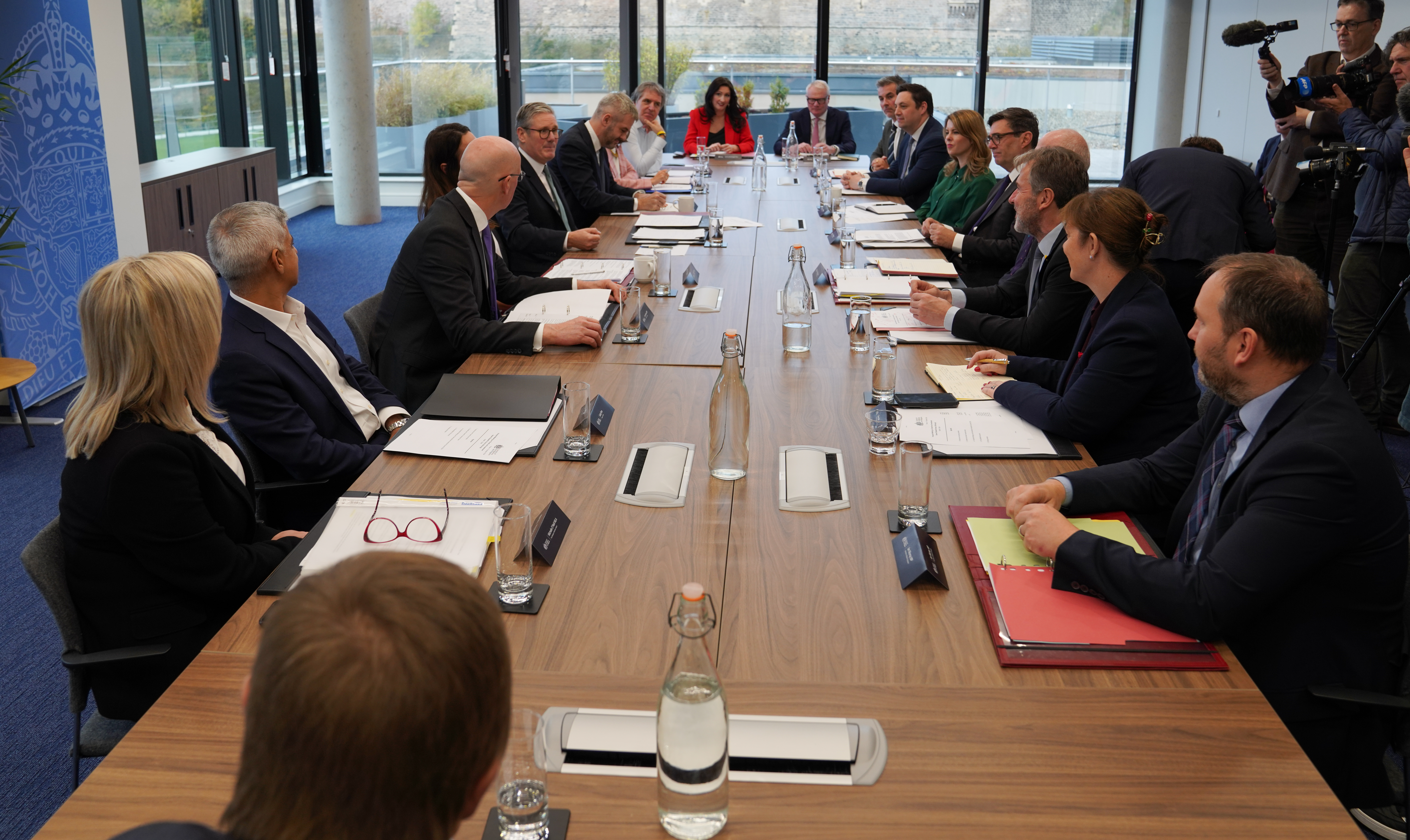
- First meeting of the council in Edinburgh, Scotland, 11 October 2024
- Formation: 11 October 2024; 2 years ago
- Region served: United Kingdom
- Field: Intergovernmental relations
- Chair: Andy Burnham; Prime Minister
- Website: www.gov.uk/government/collections/council-of-the-nations-and-regions

The Council of the Nations and Regions (Welsh: Cyngor y Cenhedloedd a’r Rhanbarthau) is a quasi-intergovernmental political body in the United Kingdom.

The council's members are the holders of the offices of prime minister of the United Kingdom, first minister of Scotland, first minister of Wales, first and deputy first minister of Northern Ireland, and the 14 English strategic authority mayors.

The council is separate from the Prime Minister and Heads of Devolved Governments Council, which brings together only the heads of the UK's central and devolved governments, or from the British-Irish Council, which brings together the heads of the UK's central and devolved governments, the governments of the Crown dependencies, and the government of the Republic of Ireland.

== History ==
=== Background ===
In 2022, the Labour Party published a report on constitutional reform proposals by Gordon Brown titled A New Britain: Renewing our Democracy and Rebuilding our Economy.

A chapter of the report was dedicated to the matter of improving intergovernmental relations and devolution. One proposal was for the formation of a "Council of the UK", which would bring together the UK prime minister and the heads of the devolved governments of Scotland, Wales and Northern Ireland to manage relations and coordinate efforts between the four governments. A second proposed body was a "Council of England", chaired by the prime minister, which would bring together the mayor of London, combined authority mayors, representatives of English local government, and other English stakeholders. A third proposed body was the Council of the Nations and Regions, which would bring together the UK prime minister, the heads of the three devolved governments, the mayor of London, and England's combined authority mayors.

=== Establishment ===
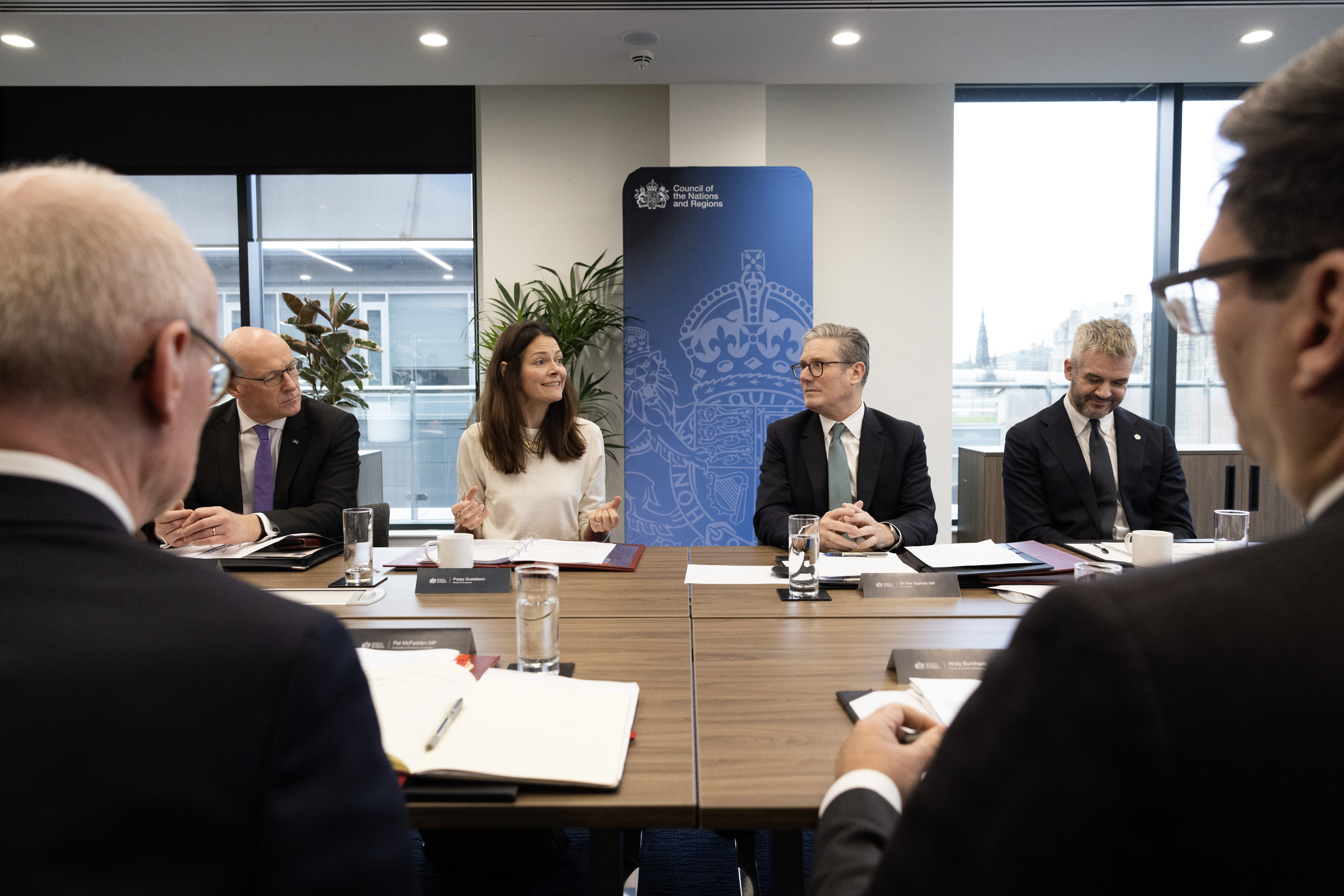
First meeting of the council, 11 October 2024

Plans for a council of the nations and regions were included in the Labour manifesto for the 2024 UK general election. Following Labour's victory in the election, on 9 July the new Prime Minister Keir Starmer met the mayors of England's combined authorities and combined county authorities and the mayor of London and announced plans to establish a council of the nations and regions. The Scottish Government said that they had not been informed of the plans prior to the announcement.

At the 2024 Labour Party Conference, Labour reiterated its commitment to the proposals, saying that all areas of England "should eventually be covered by mayoral devolution", which would then mean all areas of England would be represented on the Council.

The first meeting of the Council of the Nations and Regions took place on 11 October 2024 in Edinburgh. The work of the council will be supported by a secretariat of UK government officials.

== Membership ==
The council's members are the holders of the offices of prime minister of the United Kingdom, first minister of Scotland, first minister of Wales, first and deputy first minister of Northern Ireland, and the English strategic authority mayors.

According to a press release issued by the UK government, the deputy prime minister and the minister for intergovernmental relations will also attend the council, and that other ministers may be invited to attend on an ad hoc basis. The membership of the council is expected increase as new strategic authorities with a directly elected mayor are established in England.

The current members of the council are:

Name	Authority	Position within authority
Andy Burnham (Chair)	Government of the United Kingdom	Prime Minister of the United Kingdom; Minister for the Union; Minister for the Civil Service
John Swinney	Scottish Government	First Minister of Scotland
Rhun ap Iorwerth	Welsh Government	First Minister of Wales
Michelle O'Neill	Northern Ireland Executive	First Minister of Northern Ireland
Emma Little-Pengelly	Northern Ireland Executive	Deputy First Minister of Northern Ireland
The Lord Khan of Tooting	Greater London Authority	Mayor of London
Paul Bristow	Cambridgeshire and Peterborough Combined Authority	Mayor of Cambridgeshire and Peterborough
Claire Ward	East Midlands Combined County Authority	Mayor of the East Midlands
Andrea Jenkyns	Greater Lincolnshire Combined Authority	Mayor of Greater Lincolnshire
Bev Craig	Greater Manchester Combined Authority	Mayor of Greater Manchester
Luke Campbell	Hull and East Yorkshire Combined Authority	Mayor of Hull and East Yorkshire
Steve Rotheram	Liverpool City Region Combined Authority	Mayor of the Liverpool City Region
Kim McGuinness	North East Combined Authority	Mayor of the North East
Oliver Coppard	South Yorkshire Mayoral Combined Authority	Mayor of South Yorkshire
The Lord Houchen of High Leven	Tees Valley Combined Authority	Mayor of the Tees Valley
Richard Parker	West Midlands Combined Authority	Mayor of the West Midlands
Helen Godwin	West of England Combined Authority	Mayor of the West of England
Tracy Brabin	West Yorkshire Combined Authority	Mayor of West Yorkshire
David Skaith	York and North Yorkshire Combined Authority	Mayor of York and North Yorkshire

== Meetings ==
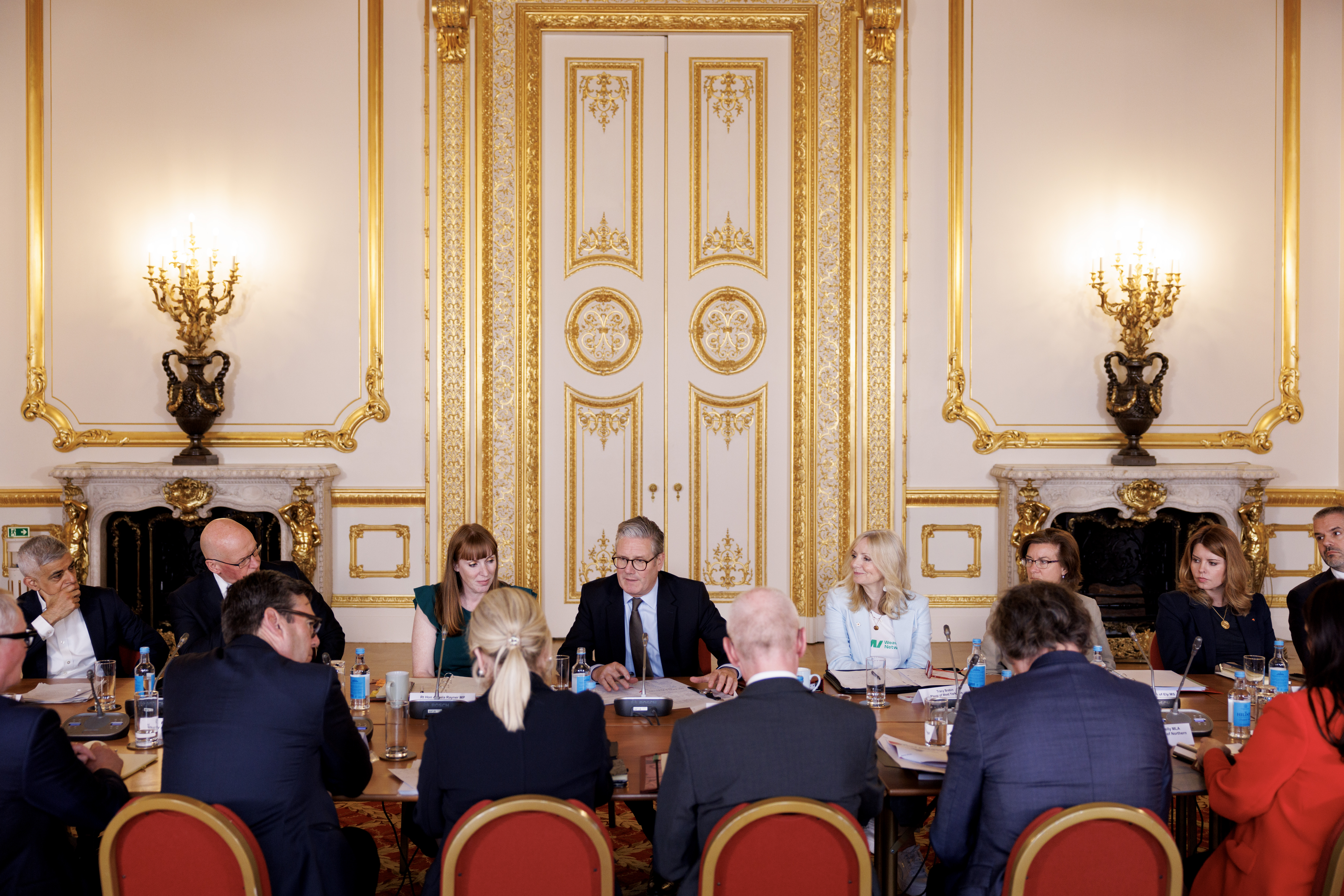
A meeting of the council in May 2025

The first meeting of the council took place in October 2024. The council meets twice a year.

Meetings of the Council of the Nations and Regions
Date	Location	Host
11 October 2024	Queen Elizabeth House, Edinburgh	Scotland
23 May 2025	Lancaster House, London	England

== See also ==
- East–West Council
- Inter-Parliamentary Forum
- Intergovernmental relations in the United Kingdom
- Leaders' Council (United Kingdom)
- Mayoral Council for England
- National Economic Council (United Kingdom)
- Prime Minister and Heads of Devolved Governments Council
- List of current heads of government in the United Kingdom and dependencies
