= 2011 Ryedale District Council election =

2011 UK local government election

The 2011 Ryedale District Council election was held on Thursday 5 May 2011 to elect all 30 members of Ryedale District Council to a four-year term, the same day as other local elections in the United Kingdom. It was preceded by the 2007 election and followed by the 2015 election. The Conservative Party gained the council from no overall control. The turnout across the contested wards was 50.2%.

== Results summary ==
2011 Ryedale District Council election
Party	Seats	Net gain/loss	Seats %	Votes %	Votes	+/−
Conservative	20	▲6	66.7			
Independent	4	▼2	13.3			
Liberal	4	▲2	13.3			
Liberal Democrats	2	▼6	6.7			
Labour	0	Steady	0.0			

== Ward results ==
=== Amotherby ===
Amotherby (1 seat)
Party	Candidate	Votes	%	±%
Conservative	John Hicks	451	64.1	▲15.8
Liberal Democrats	Jane Wilford*	253	35.9	▼15.8
Majority		198	28.1	N/A
Total valid votes		704	98.5	
Rejected ballots		11	1.5	
Turnout		715	45.6	
Registered electors		1,568		
Conservative gain from Liberal Democrats		Swing	▲15.8	

=== Ampleforth ===
Ampleforth (1 seat)
Party	Candidate	Votes	%	±%
Conservative	Jim Bailey*	Unopposed		
Registered electors		1,512		
Conservative hold				

=== Cropton ===
Cropton (1 seat)
Party	Candidate	Votes	%	±%
Liberal	John Clark*	359	46.7	▼0.2
Conservative	Ena Dent	353	45.9	▲4.6
Liberal Democrats	Allan Reynolds	57	7.4	▼4.4
Majority		6	0.8	▼4.8
Total valid votes		769	99.4	
Rejected ballots		5	0.6	
Turnout		774	60.6	
Registered electors		1,278		
Liberal hold		Swing	▼2.4	

=== Dales ===
Dales (1 seat)
Party	Candidate	Votes	%	±%
Conservative	Janet Frank*	Unopposed		
Registered electors		1,194		
Conservative hold				

=== Derwent ===
Derwent (2 seats)
Party	Candidate	Votes	%	±%
Conservative	James Fraser	719		
Conservative	Caroline Goodrick	628		
Independent	Judith Scott	410		
Liberal Democrats	Marian Hodgson*	329		
Labour	Heather Milner	265		
Total valid votes				
Rejected ballots		9		
Turnout				
Registered electors		2,786		
Conservative hold				
Conservative gain from Liberal Democrats				

=== Helmsley ===
Helmsley (2 seats)
Party	Candidate	Votes	%	±%
Conservative	Stephen Arnold*	Unopposed		
Conservative	George Hawkins*	Unopposed		
Registered electors		2,595		
Conservative hold				
Conservative hold				

=== Hovingham ===
Hovingham (1 seat)
Party	Candidate	Votes	%	±%
Independent	Robert Wainwright*	Unopposed		
Registered electors		1,447		
Independent hold				

=== Kirkbymoorside ===
Kirkbymoorside (2 seats)
Party	Candidate	Votes	%	±%
Liberal	Sarah Ward	730		
Conservative	David Cussons*	662		
Conservative	Val Arnold*	632		
Liberal	Nelly Trevelyan	562		
Liberal Democrats	Peter Lerew	129		
Total valid votes				
Rejected ballots		12		
Turnout				
Registered electors		2,829		
Liberal gain from Conservative				
Conservative hold				

=== Malton ===
Malton (3 seats)
Party	Candidate	Votes	%	±%
Independent	Paul Andrews*	639		
Liberal Democrats	Lindsay Burr*	559		
Conservative	Ann Hopkinson	518		
Independent	Howard Croft	451		
Liberal Democrats	Stephen Preston	361		
Conservative	Martin Beaumont	351		
Liberal Democrats	David White	292		
Labour	Tim Prest	260		
Total valid votes				
Rejected ballots		2		
Turnout				
Registered electors		3,923		
Independent hold				
Liberal Democrats hold				
Conservative gain from Independent				

=== Norton East ===
Norton East (2 seats)
Party	Candidate	Votes	%	±%
Independent	Peter Walker	418		
Liberal Democrats	Elizabeth Shields*	405		
Liberal Democrats	Howard Keal*	332		
Conservative	Stephen Shaw	270		
Conservative	Hilary Lockwood	154		
Total valid votes				
Rejected ballots		10		
Turnout				
Registered electors		3,065		
Independent gain from Liberal Democrats				
Liberal Democrats hold				

=== Norton West ===
Norton West (2 seats)
Party	Candidate	Votes	%	±%
Conservative	Judith Denniss	353		
Conservative	Luke Ives	327		
Liberal Democrats	Dinah Keal*	306		
Liberal Democrats	Hugh Spencer	287		
Independent	Jeremy Powell	263		
Labour	Karl Reveley	137		
Liberal	Phil Hancock	102		
Total valid votes				
Rejected ballots		2		
Turnout				
Registered electors		2,723		
Conservative gain from Liberal Democrats				
Conservative gain from Independent				

=== Pickering East ===
Pickering East (2 seats)
Party	Candidate	Votes	%	±%
Conservative	Vivienne Knaggs	529		
Liberal	Tommy Woodward	474		
Conservative	Nick King	432		
Liberal	Sue Cowan	419		
Liberal Democrats	John Stott	192		
Labour	Geoff Randall	181		
Total valid votes				
Rejected ballots		32		
Turnout				
Registered electors		2,690		
Conservative gain from Liberal Democrats				
Liberal hold				

=== Pickering West ===
Pickering West (2 seats)
Party	Candidate	Votes	%	±%
Conservative	Linda Cowling*	588		
Liberal	Luke Richardson	472		
Independent	Natalie Warriner*	360		
Labour	Fred Downes	225		
Independent	Adrian Wilford	76		
Total valid votes				
Rejected ballots		11		
Turnout				
Registered electors		2,871		
Conservative hold				
Liberal gain from Independent				

=== Rillington ===
Rillington (1 seat)
Party	Candidate	Votes	%	±%
Independent	Brian Maud*	Unopposed		
Registered electors		1,446		
Independent hold				

=== Ryedale South West ===
Ryedale South West (1 seat)
Party	Candidate	Votes	%	±%
Conservative	Keith Knaggs*	458	64.1	▼14.8
Independent	Denys Townsend	256	35.9	New
Majority		202	28.3	▼29.6
Total valid votes		714	98.8	
Rejected ballots		9	1.2	
Turnout		723	53.0	
Registered electors		1,363		
Conservative hold		Swing	▼25.3	

=== Sherburn ===
Sherburn (1 seat)
Party	Candidate	Votes	%	±%
Conservative	John Raper*	362	65.6	▲10.1
Liberal Democrats	Mike Beckett	190	34.4	▼10.1
Majority		172	31.2	▲20.3
Total valid votes		552	96.8	
Rejected ballots		18	3.2	
Turnout		570	36.0	
Registered electors		1,582		
Conservative hold		Swing	▲10.1	

=== Sheriff Hutton ===
Sheriff Hutton (1 seat)
Party	Candidate	Votes	%	±%
Conservative	Eric Hope	Unopposed		
Registered electors		1,431		
Conservative hold				

=== Sinnington ===
Sinnington (1 seat)
Party	Candidate	Votes	%	±%
Conservative	Snowy Windress*	533	73.8	▲11.8
Liberal Democrats	Abigail Stokell Beckett	189	26.2	▼11.8
Majority		344	47.6	▲23.6
Total valid votes		722	96.1	
Rejected ballots		29	3.9	
Turnout		751	52.4	
Registered electors		1,434		
Conservative hold		Swing	▲11.8	

=== Thornton Dale ===
Thornton Dale (2 seats)
Party	Candidate	Votes	%	±%
Conservative	Janet Sanderson	794		
Conservative	Geoff Acomb*	763		
Liberal Democrats	David Porter	557		
Total valid votes				
Rejected ballots		24		
Turnout				
Registered electors		2,732		
Conservative gain from Liberal Democrats				
Conservative hold				

=== Wolds ===
Wolds (1 seat)
Party	Candidate	Votes	%	±%
Conservative	Edward Legard*	Unopposed		
Registered electors		1,426		
Conservative hold				
