= Keane Duncan =

English Conservative politician

Leader of Ryedale District Council
- In office May 2019 – February 2021
- Preceded by: Linda Cowling
- Succeeded by: Vacant (February 2021 – April 2023)

Personal details
- Born: 1 January 1995 (age 31)
- Party: Conservative Party (UK)
- Education: University of York
- Profession: Journalist
- Website: www.keane4mayor.co.uk

Keane Charles Duncan (born 1 January 1995) is an English Conservative politician who was the Conservative Party's 2024 candidate to be Mayor of York and North Yorkshire.

He served as Leader of Ryedale District Council from May 2019 to February 2021, taking the role at the age of 24, making him the youngest council leader in the country.

He lives in Malton, is openly LGBT+ and previously worked as a deputy news editor for the Daily Star.

== Political career ==
Duncan studied at the University of York and was Chairman of the University of York Conservative and Unionist Association for 2014–2015.

He was elected in the 2015 Ryedale District Council election, aged 20. In the 2017 North Yorkshire County Council election he became the youngest member of North Yorkshire County Council.

Duncan stood for re-election in the 2019 Ryedale District Council election. He retained his ward and was appointed Leader of the Council. During his term, Conservative councillors stated their opposition to fracking and called for a moratorium in Ryedale. He supported proposals to create two new unitary authorities for York and North Yorkshire but stood down as Leader in protest at proposals to increase Council Tax.

In 2022, he was elected for the Norton-on-Derwent division of the new, unitary North Yorkshire Council. He was subsequently appointed to North Yorkshire County Council's Executive with responsibility for highways and transportation, a role he continued to hold at North Yorkshire Council.

Duncan was selected by the Conservative Party as its candidate in the May 2024 election for Mayor of York and North Yorkshire.

Duncan took a novel approach to campaigning, carrying out a tour of North Yorkshire, aiming to visit 1,000 communities in 100 days. His policy of nationalising the Grand Hotel in Scarborough raised concerns over its feasibility, and how conservative the threat of compulsory purchase was. In response, Duncan claimed that a new Mayoral Development Corporation would be established with the legal powers to seize the hotel from Britannia, then to deliver the necessary private sector investment for the plan to work. His campaign was highlighted in The Guardian for its policies designed as “click bait” to attract attention on social media, and he was criticised in the same article by a local journalist for failing to answer questions about the feasibility of his policies.

== Election result ==
2024 York & North Yorkshire mayoral election
Party	Candidate	Votes	%	±%
Labour Co-op	David Skaith	66,761	35.1	N/A
Conservative	Keane Duncan	51,967	27.3	N/A
Liberal Democrats	Felicity Cunliffe-Lister	30,867	16.2	N/A
Green	Kevin Foster	15,188	8.0	N/A
Independent	Keith Tordoff	13,250	7.0	N/A
Independent	Paul Haslam	12,370	6.5	N/A
Majority		14,794	7.8	N/A
Turnout		191,279	29.89	N/A

=== By local authority ===
==== York ====
2024 York & North Yorkshire mayoral election
Party	Candidate	Votes	%	±%
Labour Co-op	David Skaith	25,639	54.0	N/A
Conservative	Keane Duncan	7,173	15.1	N/A
Liberal Democrats	Felicity Cunliffe-Lister	5,945	12.5	N/A
Green	Kevin Foster	3,609	7.6	N/A
Independent	Keith Tordoff	2,543	5.4	N/A
Independent	Paul Haslam	2,357	5.0	N/A
Turnout		47,513	30.67	N/A

==== North Yorkshire ====
2024 York & North Yorkshire mayoral election
Party	Candidate	Votes	%	±%
Conservative	Keane Duncan	44,794	31.2	N/A
Labour Co-op	David Skaith	41,122	28.6	N/A
Liberal Democrats	Felicity Cunliffe-Lister	24,922	17.3	N/A
Green	Kevin Foster	11,579	8.1	N/A
Independent	Keith Tordoff	10,707	7.4	N/A
Independent	Paul Haslam	10,013	7.0	N/A
Turnout		143,766	29.64	N/A
