= 2025 Hull and East Yorkshire mayoral election =

Local election in England

- 1 May 2025
- Registered: 454,462
- Turnout: 135,383 (29.8%)
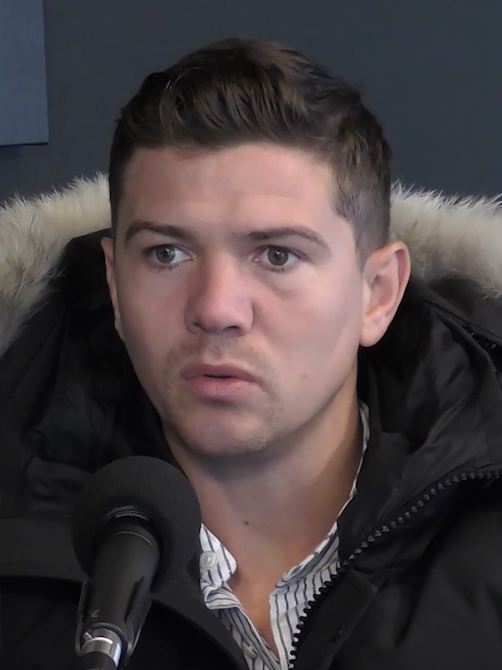
Candidate	Luke Campbell	Mike Ross	Anne Handley
Party	Reform	Liberal Democrats	Conservative
Popular vote	48,491	37,510	21,393
Percentage	35.8%	27.7%	15.8%
Candidate	Margaret Pinder	Kerry Harrison	Rowan Halstead
Party	Labour	Green	Yorkshire
Popular vote	18,568	5,049	4,372
Percentage	13.7%	3.7%	3.2%
- Area covered by election
Mayor before election
Did not exist
Elected Mayor
Luke Campbell
Reform UK

The 2025 Hull and East Yorkshire mayoral election was held on 1 May 2025 to elect the inaugural mayor of Hull and East Yorkshire, on the same day as other local elections across the country. The mayor was elected using first past the post. Luke Campbell of Reform UK was declared the winner on 2 May 2025.

== Background ==
The election covers the ceremonial county of East Riding of Yorkshire, which is governed by two councils: East Riding of Yorkshire Council and Hull City Council. Those councils remain in place, with some powers being transferred to the new mayor.

== Electoral system ==
The election used the voting system of first past the post to elect the mayor, in this system the candidate with the most votes wins. The Electoral Reform Society described the move towards first past the post as one lowering the bar for politicians and thus damaging British democracy.

== Candidates ==
Anne Handley, the leader of East Riding of Yorkshire Council, was the Conservative Party's candidate for mayor.

Margaret Pinder, the former mayor of Beverley, was the Labour Party candidate. She was the party’s candidate for Beverley and Holderness in the 2024 general election, where she was narrowly beaten by the incumbent Conservative MP, Graham Stuart.

Mike Ross, the leader of Hull City Council, was announced as the Liberal Democrat candidate for mayor in November 2024.

Kerry Harrison was announced as the Green Party candidate for mayor in December 2024. She was the party's candidate for Kingston upon Hull North and Cottingham in the 2024 general election.

Rowan Halstead was announced as the Yorkshire Party candidate for Mayor on 30 January 2025. He is an engineer and ex-soldier and has previously stood for the Bricknell Ward in the 2024 Hull City Council election, and also stood for the party in the 2024 UK general election for the Kingston upon Hull North and Cottingham Constituency.

Luke Campbell was announced as Reform UK's candidate at a rally in Connexin Live Arena on 27 February 2025. He was a professional boxer who won a gold medal for Team GB at the London 2012 Olympic Games in the 56 kg Bantamweight division.

== Opinion polls ==
Dates conducted	Pollster	Client	Sample size	Campbell Ref	Handley Con	Ross LD	Pinder Lab	Harrison Grn	Halstead Yorks	Lead
2 May 2025	2025 election		–	50.4%	35.8%	27.7%	13.7%	3.7%	3.2%	14.6
29–30 Apr	Find Out Now	N/A	746	40%	14%	21%	17%	5%	3%	19
15–23 Apr	More in Common	The Observer	963	27%	24%	22%	17%	7%	4%	3
9–23 Apr	YouGov	N/A	940	34%	15%	21%	20%	7%	3%	13

== Results ==
2025 Hull and East Yorkshire mayoral election
Party	Candidate	Votes	%
Reform	Luke Campbell	48,491	35.8
Liberal Democrats	Mike Ross	37,510	27.7
Conservative	Anne Handley	21,393	15.8
Labour	Margaret Pinder	18,568	13.7
Green	Kerry Harrison	5,049	3.7
Yorkshire	Rowan Halstead	4,372	3.2
Majority		10,981	8.1
Rejected ballots		317	
Turnout		135,383	29.8
Reform win (new seat)			
