= 2003 Ryedale District Council election =

2003 UK local government election

Map of the results

Elections to Ryedale District Council were held on 1 May 2003 in the United Kingdom. The whole council was up for election with boundary changes since the last election in 1999 increasing the number of seats by 7. The council stayed under no overall control.

== Election result ==
Ryedale local election result 2003
| Party | Seats | Gains | Losses | Net gain/loss | Seats % | Votes % | Votes | +/− |
|---|---|---|---|---|---|---|---|---|
| Conservative | 13 | | | +2 | 43.3 | 40.6 | 8,862 | |
| Liberal Democrats | 8 | | | +3 | 26.7 | 27.5 | 6,006 | |
| Independent | 7 | | | +1 | 23.3 | 21.1 | 4,601 | |
| Liberal | 2 | | | +2 | 6.7 | 3.5 | 762 | |
| Labour | 0 | | | -1 | 0 | 7.4 | 1,605 | |

1 Conservative candidate was unopposed.

== Ward results ==
Amotherby
| Party | Candidate | Votes | % | ±% |
|---|---|---|---|---|
| Conservative | Pamela Anderson | 318 | 66.9 | |
| Liberal Democrats | Florence Ford | 157 | 33.1 | |
| Majority | | 161 | 33.8 | |
| Turnout | | 475 | 33.8 | |

Ampleforth
| Party | Candidate | Votes | % | ±% |
|---|---|---|---|---|
| Conservative | James Bailey | 366 | 66.8 | |
| Liberal Democrats | Anne Carter | 182 | 33.2 | |
| Majority | | 184 | 33.6 | |
| Turnout | | 548 | 42.8 | |

Cropton
| Party | Candidate | Votes | % | ±% |
|---|---|---|---|---|
| Liberal | John Clark | 368 | 54.6 | |
| Conservative | Gregory White | 306 | 45.4 | |
| Majority | | 62 | 9.2 | |
| Turnout | | 674 | 55.8 | |

Dales
| Party | Candidate | Votes | % | ±% |
|---|---|---|---|---|
| Liberal | Nelly Trevelyan | 394 | 59.4 | |
| Conservative | Charles Scott | 269 | 40.6 | |
| Majority | | 125 | 18.8 | |
| Turnout | | 663 | 58.3 | |

Derwent (2)
| Party | Candidate | Votes | % | ±% |
|---|---|---|---|---|
| Conservative | Brian Cottam | 603 | | |
| Conservative | David Clarkson | 510 | | |
| Liberal Democrats | Ronald King | 419 | | |
| Turnout | | 1,532 | 36.2 | |

Helmsley (2)
| Party | Candidate | Votes | % | ±% |
|---|---|---|---|---|
| Conservative | Richard Murray-Wells | 633 | | |
| Conservative | Christopher Parkin | 597 | | |
| Independent | Edward Wardle | 557 | | |
| Turnout | | 1,787 | 44.2 | |

Hovingham
| Party | Candidate | Votes | % | ±% |
|---|---|---|---|---|
| Independent | Charles Wainwright | 562 | 90.4 | |
| Labour | David Fearnhead | 60 | 9.6 | |
| Majority | | 502 | 80.8 | |
| Turnout | | 622 | 45.1 | |

Kirkbymoorside (2)
| Party | Candidate | Votes | % | ±% |
|---|---|---|---|---|
| Conservative | David Cussons | 677 | | |
| Conservative | Valerie Arnold | 549 | | |
| Labour | Garfield Hobbs | 545 | | |
| Labour | Susan Balf | 417 | | |
| Turnout | | 2,188 | 43.9 | |

Malton (3)
| Party | Candidate | Votes | % | ±% |
|---|---|---|---|---|
| Liberal Democrats | Lindsay Burr | 589 | | |
| Liberal Democrats | Stephen Preston | 537 | | |
| Liberal Democrats | Paul Andrews | 417 | | |
| Independent | Ann Hopkinson | 400 | | |
| Conservative | Martin Dales | 385 | | |
| Conservative | Patricia Moore | 378 | | |
| Conservative | Anne Edwards | 338 | | |
| Turnout | | 3,098 | 30.7 | |

Norton East (2)
| Party | Candidate | Votes | % | ±% |
|---|---|---|---|---|
| Liberal Democrats | Elizabeth Shields | 407 | | |
| Liberal Democrats | Howard Keal | 290 | | |
| Conservative | Stephen Shaw | 186 | | |
| Labour | Ann Beaumont | 112 | | |
| Labour | Stephen Langton | 87 | | |
| Turnout | | 1,082 | 22.9 | |

Norton West (2)
| Party | Candidate | Votes | % | ±% |
|---|---|---|---|---|
| Independent | Allin Jenkins | 456 | | |
| Liberal Democrats | Dinah Keal | 456 | | |
| Liberal Democrats | Stuart Collins | 296 | | |
| Labour | James Urquhart | 99 | | |
| Turnout | | 1,227 | 27.1 | |

Pickering East (2)
| Party | Candidate | Votes | % | ±% |
|---|---|---|---|---|
| Independent | Joan Taylor | 486 | | |
| Liberal Democrats | Arthur Aslett | 466 | | |
| Conservative | Angela Huggan | 360 | | |
| Labour | Judith Dixon | 165 | | |
| Labour | Jill Murkett | 120 | | |
| Turnout | | 1,597 | 35.2 | |

Pickering West (2)
| Party | Candidate | Votes | % | ±% |
|---|---|---|---|---|
| Conservative | Linda Cowling | 528 | | |
| Independent | Natalie Warriner | 475 | | |
| Liberal Democrats | Krystina Meinardi | 290 | | |
| Turnout | | 1,293 | 30.2 | |

Rillington
| Party | Candidate | Votes | % | ±% |
|---|---|---|---|---|
| Independent | Brian Maud | 384 | 69.6 | |
| Conservative | James Robinson | 168 | 30.4 | |
| Majority | | 216 | 39.2 | |
| Turnout | | 552 | 40.5 | |

Ryedale South West
| Party | Candidate | Votes | % | ±% |
|---|---|---|---|---|
| Conservative | Keith Knaggs | 448 | 77.5 | |
| Liberal Democrats | Barbara Kerrison | 130 | 22.5 | |
| Majority | | 318 | 55.0 | |
| Turnout | | 578 | 44.7 | |

Sherburn
| Party | Candidate | Votes | % | ±% |
|---|---|---|---|---|
| Conservative | John Raper | 298 | 54.2 | |
| Liberal Democrats | Percy Spaven | 252 | 45.8 | |
| Majority | | 46 | 8.4 | |
| Turnout | | 550 | 38.0 | |

Sheriff Hutton
| Party | Candidate | Votes | % | ±% |
|---|---|---|---|---|
| Independent | Alan Farnaby | 621 | 84.4 | |
| Conservative | James Cleary | 115 | 15.6 | |
| Majority | | 506 | 68.8 | |
| Turnout | | 736 | 54.3 | |

Sinnington
| Party | Candidate | Votes | % | ±% |
|---|---|---|---|---|
| Conservative | Phillip Huntington | 419 | 68.4 | |
| Liberal Democrats | Adrian Bishop | 194 | 31.6 | |
| Majority | | 225 | 36.8 | |
| Turnout | | 613 | 45.4 | |

Thornton Dale (2)
| Party | Candidate | Votes | % | ±% |
|---|---|---|---|---|
| Independent | Wilfred Garbutt | 660 | | |
| Liberal Democrats | Helen Schroeder | 579 | | |
| Conservative | Ronald Haigh | 411 | | |
| Liberal Democrats | Allan Monkhouse | 345 | | |
| Turnout | | 1,995 | 43.5 | |

Wolds
| Party | Candidate | Votes | % | ±% |
|---|---|---|---|---|
| Conservative | Allan Howard | unopposed | | |
