= York and North Yorkshire Combined Authority =

Strategic authority and combined authority in England

- Area covered by the York and North Yorkshire Combined Authority

Type
- Type: Combined authority
- Houses: Unicameral
- Term limits: None

History
- Founded: 20 December 2023

Leadership
- Mayor: David Skaith, Labour

Structure
- Graph of the party split among 5 seats.
- Political groups: Labour (3) Conservative (2)

Elections
- Voting system: Directly elected mayor
- Last election: 2 May 2024
- Next election: 2028

Meeting place
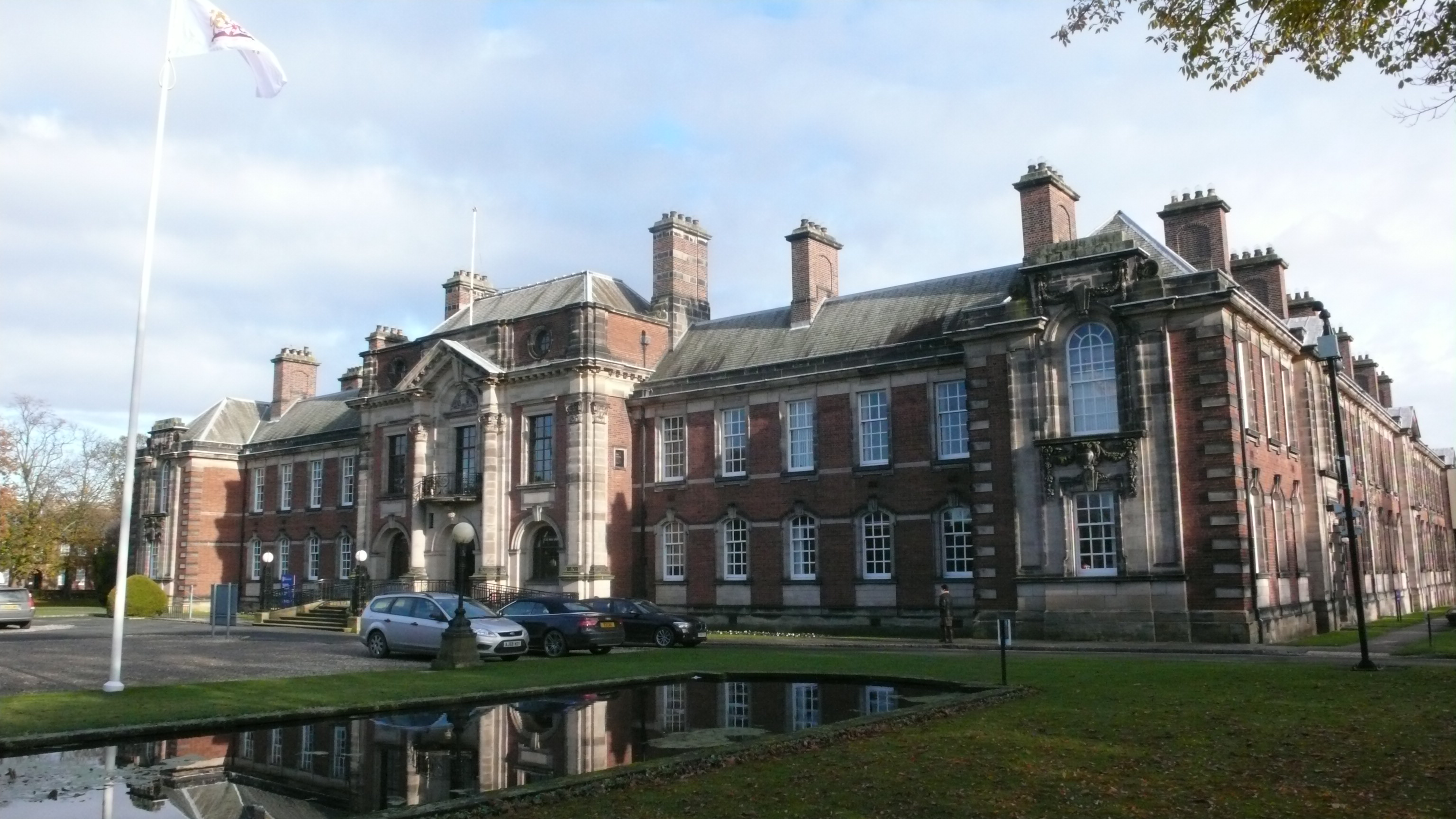
- County Hall, Northallerton

Website
- https://yorknorthyorks-ca.gov.uk/

The York and North Yorkshire Combined Authority (Y&NYCA) is the combined authority for York and North Yorkshire, England. It is composed of two local authorities: the City of York Council and North Yorkshire Council.

== History ==
Discussion of a devolution deal involving North Yorkshire County Council and the City of York council authorities began in 2022, although with some concerns from York that the mayoralty would be dominated by North Yorkshire. A deal for a York and North Yorkshire Combined Authority and Mayor of York and North Yorkshire between the UK government and the two councils was struck on 1 August 2022.

Legislation to establish the authority, encompassing the unitary authority areas of York and North Yorkshire, was made on 19 December 2023. The combined authority assumed its powers on 20 December 2023 and held its first meeting on 22 January 2024. It held a launch event on 1 February 2024.

The first mayor of York and North Yorkshire, David Skaith, was elected in the 2024 York and North Yorkshire mayoral election in May 2024. The mayor is a member of the Mayoral Council for England and the Council of the Nations and Regions.

== Membership ==
The cabinet of the combined authority is made up of the mayor of York and North Yorkshire and two members from each constituent council.

| Name | Membership | Position within nominating authority | Nominating authority |
|---|---|---|---|
| David Skaith | Constituent | Mayor of York and North Yorkshire | Direct election |
| Carl Les | Constituent | Leader of the Council | North Yorkshire Council |
| Claire Douglas | Constituent | Leader of the Council | City of York Council |
| Gareth Dadd | Constituent | Deputy Leader of the Council | North Yorkshire Council |
| Robert Webb | Constituent | Deputy Leader of the Council | City of York Council |

== List of mayors ==
The first mayor of York and North Yorkshire was elected in the 2024 York and North Yorkshire mayoral election. The mayor is a member of the Mayoral Council for England and the Council of the Nations and Regions.

== See also ==
- North Yorkshire Police
- North Yorkshire Police, Fire and Crime Commissioner
