= Hull and East Yorkshire Combined Authority =

Strategic authority and combined authority in England

- Logo

- Area covered by the Hull and East Yorkshire Combined Authority

Type
- Type: Combined authority of the East Riding of Yorkshire
- Term limits: None

History
- Founded: 5 February 2025

Leadership
- Mayor: Luke Campbell, Reform UK since 6 May 2025

Structure
- Graph of the party split among 5 seats.

Elections
- Voting system: Directly elected mayor
- Last election: 1 May 2025
- Next election: 3 May 2029

Meeting place
- Two Humber Keys, Wellington Street West, Kingston upon Hull, HU1 2BN

Website
- https://www.hullandeastyorkshire.gov.uk/

The Hull and East Yorkshire Combined Authority (HEYCA) is a combined authority covering the ceremonial county of East Riding of Yorkshire, England. The authority represents two local authorities: Hull City Council and East Riding of Yorkshire Council. The first election for the mayor of Hull and East Yorkshire, who chairs the combined authority, took place on 1 May 2025. On 6 May 2025, Luke Campbell took office as the first mayor, representing Reform UK.

== History ==
The Hull and East Yorkshire devolution deal was announced on 22 November 2023. The deal proposes to devolve certain powers, i.e. housing, transport, education and skills as well as environmental matters to the Hull and East Yorkshire Mayoral Combined Authority (HEYMCA). The consultation by the constituent councils received significant support in favour of the HEYMCA.

In March 2024 it was decided to replace the local enterprise partnership for the combined authority's area with a Business, Growth and Skills Hub, and board member vacancies for the hub were advertised in July 2024. A business board for Hull and East Yorkshire was formed in November 2024.

A decision by the Secretary of State for Housing, Communities and Local Government was required to allow the creation of the combined authority to proceed, followed by secondary legislation to set out its powers, duties, and governance arrangements. The two councils involved gave their approval to present the final draft order for the creation of the combined authority before Parliament, with East Yorkshire doing so in May 2024 and Hull in June. The plans were announced by Jeremy Hunt in the 2023 Autumn Statement. It was hoped that the combined authority would be formally established in autumn 2024, and following the 2024 general election, the newly elected Labour Government agreed the plans on 19 September 2024. Draft statutory instruments to establish the combined authority were laid before parliament on 27 November 2024 and came into effect on 5 February 2025.

The mayor is a member of the Mayoral Council for England and the Council of the Nations and Regions.

The first meeting of the authority took place on 5 March 2025.

The first election for the Mayor of Hull and East Yorkshire took place on 1 May 2025. The election was won by the Reform UK candidate, Luke Campbell. He took office on 6 May 2025.

== Membership ==
The executive board of the combined authority board is made up of the directly elected Mayor of Hull and East Yorkshire, two members from each of the constituent authorities and up to four non-constituent members.

Executive board

| Name | Nominating authority | Position within authority |
|---|---|---|
| Luke Campbell | Hull and East Yorkshire Combined Authority | Mayor of Hull and East Yorkshire |
Constituent members
| Anne Handley | East Riding of Yorkshire Council | Leader of the Council |
| David Tucker | East Riding of Yorkshire Council | Member of the Council |
| Mike Ross | Hull City Council | Leader of the Council |
| Jackie Dad | Hull City Council | Member of the Council |
Non-constituent member
| Jonathan Evison | Humberside Police | Humberside Police and Crime Commissioner |
Advisory Members
| Jason Speedy | HEY Business Board | Chair |
| Jayne Adamson | HEY Skills Board | Chair |
