= York Central =

York Central may refer to:

- York Central (development), a brownfield regeneration site next to York railway station in England
- York Central (UK Parliament constituency)
- York Central Market, in York, Pennsylvania, U.S.
- York Central Hospital, now Mackenzie Richmond Hill Hospital, in Richmond Hill, Ontario, Canada

== See also ==
- Central York, a rural community in New Brunswick, Canada
- York (disambiguation)
- York Centre, a federal electoral district in Ontario, Canada
  - York Centre (provincial electoral district)
