= 2024 York and North Yorkshire mayoral election =

York and North Yorkshire mayoral election, 2024
- 2 May 2024
- Turnout: 29.89%
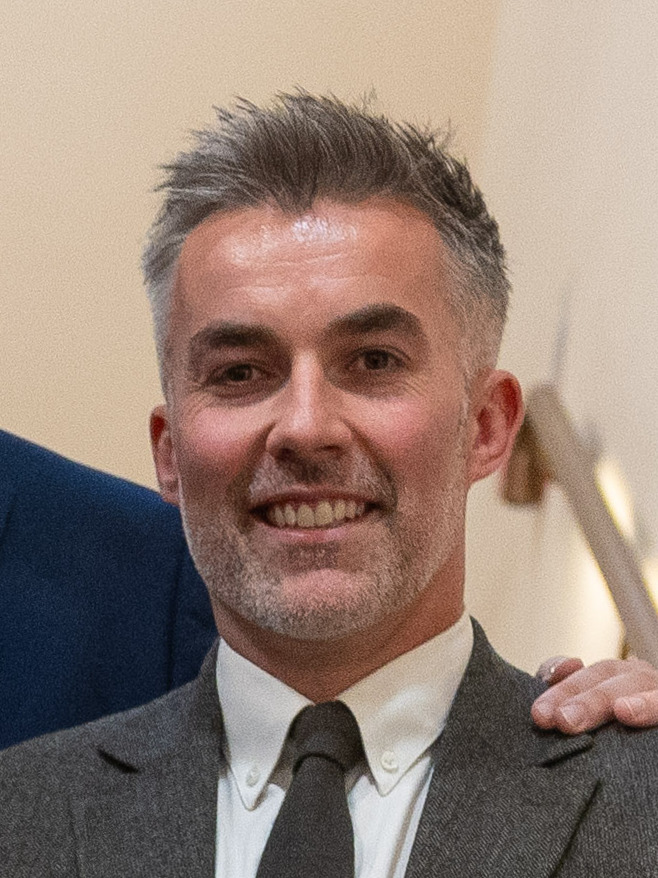

Candidate	David Skaith	Keane Duncan	Felicity Cunliffe-Lister
Party	Labour Co-op	Conservative	Liberal Democrats
Popular vote	66,761	51,967	30,867
Percentage	35.1%	27.3%	16.2%
Candidate	Kevin Foster	Keith Tordoff	Paul Haslam
Party	Green	Independent	Independent
Popular vote	15,188	13,250	12,370
Percentage	8.0%	7.0%	6.5%
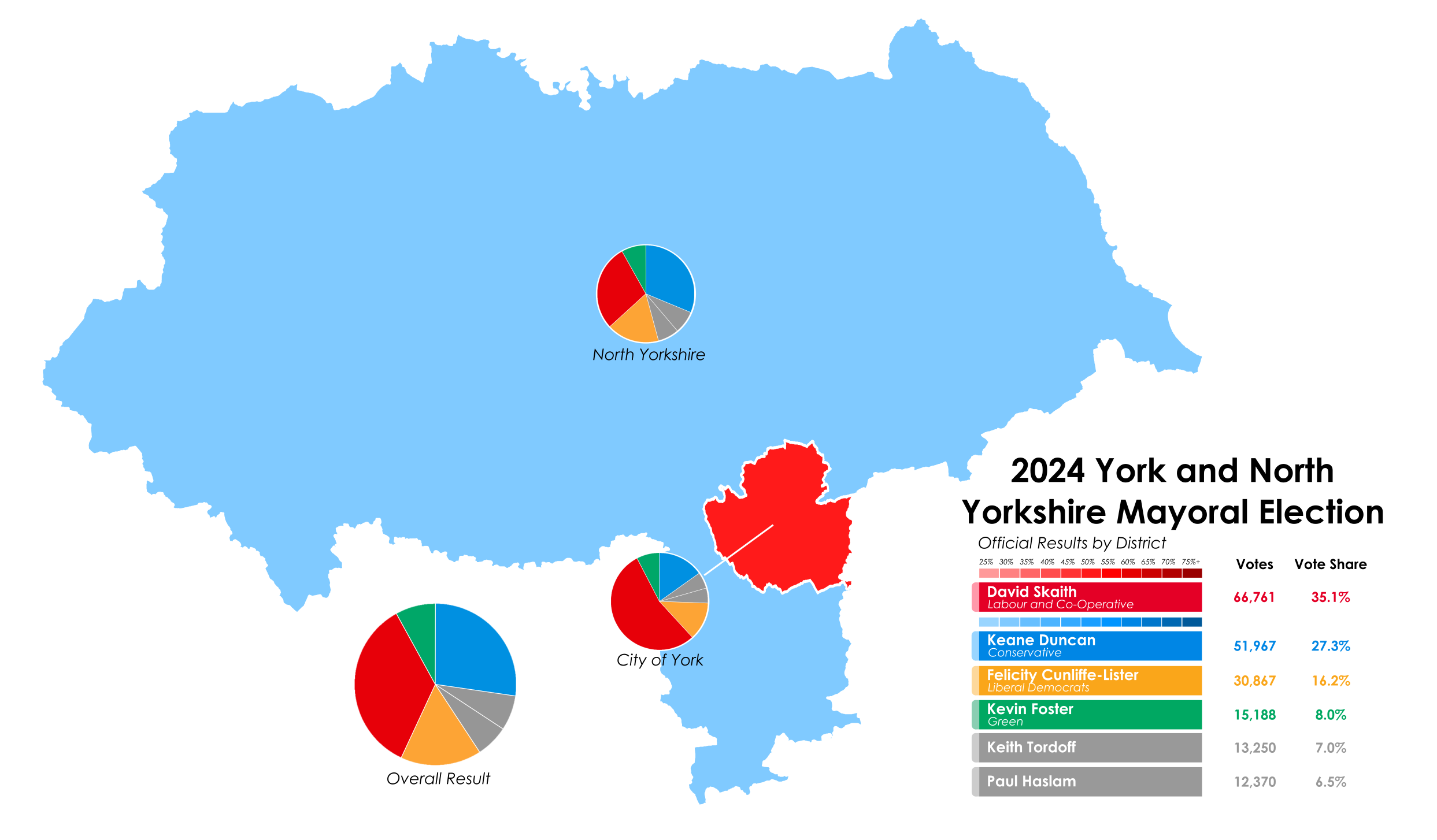
- Map of results by district.
mayor before election
Position established
Elected mayor
David Skaith
Labour Co-op

The 2024 York and North Yorkshire mayoral election was held on 2 May 2024 to elect the first mayor of York and North Yorkshire. It took place simultaneously with local elections across England and Wales and was won by the Labour candidate David Skaith.

== Background ==
The Cities and Local Government Devolution Act 2016 introduced directly elected mayors for collections of local authorities in England. A devolution deal to create the York and North Yorkshire Combined Authority encompassing the unitary authority areas of the City of York and North Yorkshire was signed on 1 August 2022, coinciding with the celebration of Yorkshire Day.

== Electoral system ==
The election used first-past-the-post to elect the mayor in accordance with the Elections Act 2022. All registered electors living in York and North Yorkshire aged 18 or over on 2 May 2024 were entitled to vote in the mayoral election. It cost £2.2 million.

== Campaign ==
The Conservative candidate Keane Duncan said he would encourage more new-build houses to be sold under a national policy that would permanently discount their prices by up to 50% for first-time buyers. He said he would spend 100 days travelling in a camper van around the area covered by the combined authority ahead of the election. He said he would consider introducing bus franchising, were it to be cost effective. He promised to fund two hours of free parking in all council car parks for a year. Duncan has also promised to purchase the Grand Hotel in Scarbrough using mayoral funds and renovate it.

David Skaith, the Labour candidate, said he would support the development of local businesses and supported a transport model similar to Andy Burnham's in Greater Manchester. He has pledged to fund a cost of living recovery plan for the region, and fight for more GP and dentist appointments if elected.

Felicity Cunliffe-Lister, the Liberal Democrat candidate, said she would support food banks and establish a scheme to deliver food to people unable to access them. She published an election manifesto in April 2024, saying "My policies are to generate sustainable economic growth, create more affordable homes, and improve the health and wellbeing of all who live here."

The independent candidate Paul Haslam said he would build houses on brownfield sites and support regenerative agriculture. The independent candidate Keith Tordoff said he would cancel plans to include two offices for the combined authority in favour of a single office in York. He also promised to supply free chickens to 2,000 households.

Duncan and Tordoff both committed to not adding a levy to council tax to fund the combined authority.

== Candidates ==
Nominations closed on 5 April 2024 with six candidates standing for election.

=== Conservative Party ===
The former Daily Star journalist, councillor and former council leader Keane Duncan, the police, fire and crime commissioner Zoë Metcalfe and the businessperson Matthew Freckelton sought the Conservative Party nomination. The party announced that Duncan had been selected in July 2023.

=== Green Party ===
The Green Party selected Kevin Foster, a councillor and former soldier, as its candidate.

=== Labour Party ===
Labour selected David Skaith, a Harrogate-born clothing shop owner and chair of the York High Street Forum, as its candidate.

=== Liberal Democrats ===
The Liberal Democrats selected Felicity Cunliffe-Lister, the Countess of Swinton, a councillor and hotel owner, as their candidate.

=== Independents ===
Paul Haslam, a management consultant who had served as a councillor on Harrogate Borough Council from 2014 until its abolition in 2023 and a councillor on North Yorkshire Council since 2017, resigned from the Conservative Party to stand as an independent candidate.

Keith Tordoff, a former police officer and sweet shop owner, was selected to be the Yorkshire Party's candidate in June 2023. He left the party after disagreeing with its leadership about his plan to supply thousands of free chickens.

== Opinion polling ==
Dates conducted	Pollster	Client	Sample size	Skaith Lab	Duncan Con	Foster Green	Cunliffe-Lister Lib Dems	Tordoff Ind	Haslam Ind	Lead
2 May 2024	2024 election		–	35.1%	27.3%	8%	16.2%	7%	6.5%	7.8
26–30 Apr 2024	Labour Together	N/A	823	41%	27%	11%	11%	6%	4%	14

== Election result ==
2024 York & North Yorkshire mayoral election
Party	Candidate	Votes	%	±%
Labour Co-op	David Skaith	66,761	35.1	N/A
Conservative	Keane Duncan	51,967	27.3	N/A
Liberal Democrats	Felicity Cunliffe-Lister	30,867	16.2	N/A
Green	Kevin Foster	15,188	8.0	N/A
Independent	Keith Tordoff	13,250	7.0	N/A
Independent	Paul Haslam	12,370	6.5	N/A
Majority		14,794	7.8	N/A
Turnout		191,279	29.89	N/A

=== By local authority ===
==== York ====
2024 York & North Yorkshire mayoral election
Party	Candidate	Votes	%	±%
Labour Co-op	David Skaith	25,639	54.0	N/A
Conservative	Keane Duncan	7,173	15.1	N/A
Liberal Democrats	Felicity Cunliffe-Lister	5,945	12.5	N/A
Green	Kevin Foster	3,609	7.6	N/A
Independent	Keith Tordoff	2,543	5.4	N/A
Independent	Paul Haslam	2,357	5.0	N/A
Turnout		47,513	30.67	N/A

==== North Yorkshire ====
2024 York & North Yorkshire mayoral election
Party	Candidate	Votes	%	±%
Conservative	Keane Duncan	44,794	31.2	N/A
Labour Co-op	David Skaith	41,122	28.6	N/A
Liberal Democrats	Felicity Cunliffe-Lister	24,922	17.3	N/A
Green	Kevin Foster	11,579	8.1	N/A
Independent	Keith Tordoff	10,707	7.4	N/A
Independent	Paul Haslam	10,013	7.0	N/A
Turnout		143,766	29.64	N/A
