= 2019 Ryedale District Council election =

2019 UK local government election

Map of the results

The 2019 Ryedale District Council election took place on 2 May 2019 to elect members of the Ryedale District Council in England. It was held on the same day as other local elections.

== Results summary ==
2019 Ryedale District Council election
| Party | Seats | Gains | Losses | Net gain/loss | Seats % | Votes % | Votes | +/− |
|---|---|---|---|---|---|---|---|---|
| Conservative | 12 | | | ▼8 | 40.0 | 39.4 | 9,311 | |
| Independent | 11 | | | ▲6 | 36.7 | 28.3 | 6,694 | |
| Liberal | 5 | | | ▲2 | 16.7 | 10.7 | 2,537 | |
| Liberal Democrats | 2 | | | Steady | 6.7 | 11.8 | 2,782 | |
| Labour | 0 | | | Steady | 0.0 | 5.8 | 1,378 | |
| Green | 0 | | | Steady | 0.0 | 4.0 | 954 | |

== Ward results ==
=== Amotherby ===
Amotherby
| Party | Candidate | Votes | % | ±% |
|---|---|---|---|---|
| Liberal Democrats | Steven Mason | 307 | 55.5 | N/A |
| Conservative | Fiona Farnell* | 246 | 44.5 | −9.5 |
| Majority | | | | |
| Turnout | | 566 | | |
| Liberal Democrats gain from Conservative | | Swing | | |

=== Ampleforth ===
Ampleforth
| Party | Candidate | Votes | % | ±% |
|---|---|---|---|---|
| Conservative | Jim Bailey* | 259 | 50.8 | −14.2 |
| Liberal Democrats | Christopher Pickles | 251 | 49.2 | N/A |
| Majority | | | | |
| Turnout | | 519 | | |
| Conservative hold | | Swing | | |

=== Cropton ===
Cropton
| Party | Candidate | Votes | % | ±% |
|---|---|---|---|---|
| Liberal | John Clark* | 352 | 54.4 | +1.6 |
| Independent | Richard Dent | 167 | 25.8 | N/A |
| Conservative | Truda Lansdowne | 128 | 19.8 | −27.4 |
| Majority | | | | |
| Turnout | | 655 | | |
| Liberal hold | | Swing | | |

=== Dales ===
Dales
| Party | Candidate | Votes | % | ±% |
|---|---|---|---|---|
| Independent | Janet Frank* | 333 | 63.7 | −1.8 |
| Conservative | Fabia Tate | 190 | 36.3 | −29.2 |
| Majority | | | | |
| Turnout | | 546 | | |
| Independent gain from Conservative | | Swing | | |

=== Derwent ===
Derwent
| Party | Candidate | Votes | % | ±% |
|---|---|---|---|---|
| Conservative | Michael Cleary | 518 | 50.4 | |
| Conservative | Susan Graham | 453 | 44.1 | |
| Liberal Democrats | Naomi Cox | 444 | 43.2 | |
| Labour | Angela Cole | 296 | 28.8 | |
| Majority | | | | |
| Turnout | | 1,060 | | |
| Conservative hold | | | | |
| Conservative hold | | | | |

=== Helmsley ===
Helmsley
| Party | Candidate | Votes | % | ±% |
|---|---|---|---|---|
| Independent | Snowy Windress | 501 | 48.6 | |
| Independent | Steve Arnold | 461 | 44.8 | |
| Conservative | Joanne Welford | 311 | 30.2 | |
| Conservative | Donald Wallace | 304 | 29.5 | |
| Green | Barbara Hickman | 271 | 26.3 | |
| Majority | | | | |
| Turnout | | 1,039 | | |
| Independent gain from Conservative | | | | |
| Independent gain from Conservative | | | | |

=== Hovingham ===
Hovingham
| Party | Candidate | Votes | % | ±% |
|---|---|---|---|---|
| Conservative | Claire Docwra | 207 | 34.8 | N/A |
| Independent | Abbie Knowlson | 184 | 30.9 | N/A |
| Liberal Democrats | Barry Doyle | 143 | 24.0 | N/A |
| Labour | Helen Yellen | 61 | 10.3 | N/A |
| Majority | | | | |
| Turnout | | 598 | | |
| Conservative gain from Independent | | Swing | | |

=== Kirkbymoorside ===
Kirkbymoorside
| Party | Candidate | Votes | % | ±% |
|---|---|---|---|---|
| Independent | Tony Riby | 405 | 37.3 | |
| Independent | David Cussons | 285 | 26.3 | |
| Liberal Democrats | Derek Chapman | 271 | 25.0 | |
| Conservative | Bob Gardiner | 259 | 23.9 | |
| Conservative | Paul Ashley | 258 | 23.8 | |
| Green | Martin Brampton | 238 | 21.9 | |
| Labour | David Yellen | 164 | 15.1 | |
| Majority | | | | |
| Turnout | | 1,093 | | |
| Independent gain from Conservative | | | | |
| Independent gain from Conservative | | | | |

=== Malton ===
Malton
| Party | Candidate | Votes | % | ±% |
|---|---|---|---|---|
| Independent | Lindsay Burr | 896 | 55.5 | |
| Independent | Paul Andrews | 721 | 44.7 | |
| Independent | Angela Kirkham-Raine | 607 | 37.6 | |
| Conservative | Rory Queen | 499 | 30.9 | |
| Independent | Stephen Shaw | 427 | 26.5 | |
| Conservative | Luke Campbell | 383 | 23.7 | |
| Conservative | Sammie Delaney | 377 | 23.4 | |
| Labour | Jack Ashton | 316 | 19.6 | |
| Majority | | | | |
| Turnout | | 1,637 | | |
| Independent hold | | | | |
| Independent hold | | | | |
| Independent hold | | | | |

=== Norton East ===
Norton East
| Party | Candidate | Votes | % | ±% |
|---|---|---|---|---|
| Conservative | Keane Duncan | 745 | 73.1 | |
| Conservative | Raymond King | 554 | 54.4 | |
| Liberal Democrats | Elizabeth Shields | 264 | 25.9 | |
| Liberal Democrats | Nick Witteveen | 130 | 12.8 | |
| Labour | Rosalie Wilkinson | 127 | 12.5 | |
| Majority | | | | |
| Turnout | | 1,030 | | |
| Conservative hold | | | | |
| Conservative gain from Liberal Democrats | | | | |

=== Norton West ===
Norton West
| Party | Candidate | Votes | % | ±% |
|---|---|---|---|---|
| Liberal Democrats | Di Keal | 481 | 52.3 | |
| Conservative | John Mackenzie | 427 | 46.4 | |
| Conservative | Tom Pinder | 413 | 44.9 | |
| Liberal Democrats | Howard Keal | 382 | 41.5 | |
| Majority | | | | |
| Turnout | | 942 | | |
| Liberal Democrats hold | | | | |
| Conservative hold | | | | |

=== Pickering East ===
Pickering East
| Party | Candidate | Votes | % | ±% |
|---|---|---|---|---|
| Liberal | Joy Andrews | 630 | 51.1 | |
| Liberal | Clive Wass | 396 | 32.1 | |
| Independent | Charles Hopkinson | 376 | 30.5 | |
| Conservative | Paul Littlewood | 345 | 28.0 | |
| Conservative | Greg White | 285 | 23.1 | |
| Labour | Douglas Sutherland | 122 | 9.9 | |
| Liberal Democrats | Peter Winter | 109 | 8.8 | |
| Majority | | | | |
| Turnout | | 1,242 | | |
| Liberal hold | | | | |
| Liberal gain from Conservative | | | | |

=== Pickering West ===
Pickering West
| Party | Candidate | Votes | % | ±% |
|---|---|---|---|---|
| Liberal | Carrie Brackstone | 592 | 57.9 | |
| Liberal | Mike Potter | 567 | 55.4 | |
| Independent | Linda Cowling | 297 | 29.0 | |
| Conservative | Philip Hall | 209 | 20.4 | |
| Conservative | Matthew Haynes | 206 | 20.1 | |
| Majority | | | | |
| Turnout | | 1,037 | | |
| Liberal hold | | | | |
| Liberal gain from Conservative | | | | |

=== Rillington ===
Rillington
| Party | Candidate | Votes | % | ±% |
|---|---|---|---|---|
| Conservative | Nathan Garbutt-Moore | | | |
| Majority | | | | |
| Turnout | | | | |
| Conservative gain from Independent | | Swing | | |

=== Ryedale South West ===
Ryedale South West
| Party | Candidate | Votes | % | ±% |
|---|---|---|---|---|
| Conservative | Caroline Goodrick | Unopposed | N/A | N/A |
| Majority | | | | |
| Turnout | | | | |
| Conservative hold | | Swing | | |

=== Sherburn ===
Sherburn
| Party | Candidate | Votes | % | ±% |
|---|---|---|---|---|
| Independent | John Raper* | 217 | 51.3 | +4.8 |
| Conservative | Paul Emberley | 206 | 48.7 | +2.2 |
| Majority | | | | |
| Turnout | | 436 | | |
| Independent gain from Conservative | | Swing | | |

=== Sheriff Hutton ===
Sheriff Hutton
| Party | Candidate | Votes | % | ±% |
|---|---|---|---|---|
| Independent | Eric Hope | 319 | 62.7 | −5.6 |
| Conservative | Jeremy Bleasdale | 190 | 37.3 | −31.0 |
| Majority | | | | |
| Turnout | | 529 | | |
| Independent gain from Conservative | | Swing | | |

=== Sinnington ===
Sinnington
| Party | Candidate | Votes | % | ±% |
|---|---|---|---|---|
| Independent | Simon Thackray | 498 | 77.2 | N/A |
| Conservative | Angela Egan | 147 | 22.8 | −39.9 |
| Majority | | | | |
| Turnout | | 649 | | |
| Independent gain from Conservative | | Swing | | |

=== Thornton Dale ===
Thornton Dale
| Party | Candidate | Votes | % | ±% |
|---|---|---|---|---|
| Conservative | Christopher Delaney | 623 | 55.4 | |
| Conservative | Will Oxley | 569 | 50.6 | |
| Green | Sandra Bell | 445 | 39.6 | |
| Labour Co-op | Mick Johnston | 292 | 26.0 | |
| Majority | | | | |
| Turnout | | 1,145 | | |
| Conservative hold | | | | |
| Conservative hold | | | | |

=== Wolds ===
Wolds
| Party | Candidate | Votes | % | ±% |
|---|---|---|---|---|
| Conservative | Tracie Middleton | Unopposed | N/A | N/A |
| Majority | | | | |
| Turnout | | | | |
| Conservative hold | | Swing | | |

== Changes 2019–2023 ==
- On 28 October 2020, Tracie Middleton left the Conservative Party to sit as an independent councillor for Wolds ward.
- In February 2022, Caroline Goodrick left the Conservative Party to sit as an independent councillor for Ryedale South West ward.
- On 1 April 2023, Ryedale District Council was abolished and its functions transferred to North Yorkshire Council.

== By-elections ==
=== Cropton ===
Cropton by-election, 18 November 2021
| Party | Candidate | Votes | % | ±% |
|---|---|---|---|---|
| Liberal | Alasdair Clark | 202 | 39.6 | −14.8 |
| Conservative | Greg White | 155 | 30.4 | +10.6 |
| Green | Richard McLane | 121 | 23.7 | N/A |
| Labour | Jill Wells | 32 | 6.3 | N/A |
| Majority | | 47 | 9.2 | |
| Turnout | | 510 | | |
| Liberal hold | | Swing | ▼13.2 | |

The by-election followed the death of Liberal councillor John Clark in August 2021. Clark had been elected in 2019 to represent Cropton ward.
