= 2007 Ryedale District Council election =

2007 UK local government election

Map of the results (including Pickering East by-election)

The 2007 Ryedale District Council election to the Ryedale District Council in North Yorkshire, England was held on 3 May 2007. The whole council was up for election and the council stayed under no overall control. One seat was vacant in Pickering East until a by-election in June.

== Election result ==
Ryedale local election result 2007
| Party | Seats | Gains | Losses | Net gain/loss | Seats % | Votes % | Votes | +/− |
|---|---|---|---|---|---|---|---|---|
| Conservative | 14 | 3 | 2 | +1 | 48.3 | 48.3 | 8,806 | +7.7% |
| Liberal Democrats | 8 | 2 | 2 | 0 | 27.6 | 30.2 | 5,507 | +2.7% |
| Independent | 6 | 2 | 2 | 0 | 20.7 | 15.7 | 2,865 | -5.4% |
| Liberal | 1 | 0 | 1 | -1 | 3.4 | 3.3 | 609 | -0.2% |
| Retired | 0 | 0 | 0 | 0 | 0 | 2.5 | 461 | +2.5% |

3 Independent, 2 Conservative and 1 Liberal Democrat candidates were unopposed.

== Ward results ==
Amotherby
| Party | Candidate | Votes | % | ±% |
|---|---|---|---|---|
| Liberal Democrats | Jane Wilford | 314 | 51.7 | +18.6 |
| Conservative | Pamela Anderson | 293 | 48.3 | −18.6 |
| Majority | | 21 | 3.4 | |
| Turnout | | 607 | 42.8 | +9.0 |
| Liberal Democrats gain from Conservative | | Swing | | |

Ampleforth
| Party | Candidate | Votes | % | ±% |
|---|---|---|---|---|
| Conservative | Jim Bailey | unopposed | | |
| Conservative hold | | Swing | | |

Cropton
| Party | Candidate | Votes | % | ±% |
|---|---|---|---|---|
| Liberal | John Clark | 342 | 46.9 | −7.7 |
| Conservative | Ena Dent | 301 | 41.3 | −4.1 |
| Liberal Democrats | Linda Clarke | 86 | 11.8 | +11.8 |
| Majority | | 41 | 5.6 | −3.6 |
| Turnout | | 729 | 58.6 | +2.8 |
| Liberal hold | | Swing | | |

Dales
| Party | Candidate | Votes | % | ±% |
|---|---|---|---|---|
| Conservative | Janet Frank | 372 | 54.9 | +14.3 |
| Liberal | Nelly Trevelyan | 267 | 39.4 | −20.0 |
| Liberal Democrats | Abigail Beckett | 39 | 5.8 | +5.8 |
| Majority | | 105 | 15.5 | |
| Turnout | | 678 | 58.5 | +0.2 |
| Conservative gain from Liberal | | Swing | | |

Derwent (2)
| Party | Candidate | Votes | % | ±% |
|---|---|---|---|---|
| Conservative | Brian Cottam | 753 | | |
| Liberal Democrats | Marian Hodgson | 444 | | |
| Independent | Nigel Wilson | 401 | | |
| Turnout | | 1,598 | 42.7 | +6.5 |
| Conservative hold | | Swing | | |
| Liberal Democrats gain from Conservative | | Swing | | |

Helmsley (2)
| Party | Candidate | Votes | % | ±% |
|---|---|---|---|---|
| Conservative | George Hawkins | 706 | | |
| Conservative | Steve Arnold | 596 | | |
| Retired | Tot Wardle | 461 | | |
| Turnout | | 1,763 | 43.6 | −0.6 |
| Conservative hold | | Swing | | |
| Conservative hold | | Swing | | |

Hovingham
| Party | Candidate | Votes | % | ±% |
|---|---|---|---|---|
| Independent | Robert Wainwright | uncontested | | |
| Independent hold | | Swing | | |

Kirkbymoorside (2)
| Party | Candidate | Votes | % | ±% |
|---|---|---|---|---|
| Conservative | David Cussons | 811 | | |
| Conservative | Val Arnold | 716 | | |
| Liberal Democrats | Peter Lerew | 448 | | |
| Turnout | | 1,975 | 43.9 | +0.0 |
| Conservative hold | | Swing | | |
| Conservative hold | | Swing | | |

Malton (3)
| Party | Candidate | Votes | % | ±% |
|---|---|---|---|---|
| Liberal Democrats | Lindsay Burr | 618 | | |
| Independent | Tony Hemesley | 554 | | |
| Independent | Paul Andrews | 485 | | |
| Liberal Democrats | Stephen Preston | 481 | | |
| Conservative | Stephen Shaw | 392 | | |
| Independent | David Wright | 333 | | |
| Conservative | Pauline Reeve | 325 | | |
| Liberal Democrats | Carl Wain | 274 | | |
| Turnout | | 3,462 | 35.6 | +4.9 |
| Liberal Democrats hold | | Swing | | |
| Independent gain from Liberal Democrats | | Swing | | |
| Independent gain from Liberal Democrats | | Swing | | |

Norton East (2)
| Party | Candidate | Votes | % | ±% |
|---|---|---|---|---|
| Liberal Democrats | Elizabeth Shields | 402 | | |
| Liberal Democrats | Howard Keal | 384 | | |
| Conservative | Patricia Dumbill | 249 | | |
| Turnout | | 1,035 | 24.4 | +1.5 |
| Liberal Democrats hold | | Swing | | |
| Liberal Democrats hold | | Swing | | |

Norton West (2)
| Party | Candidate | Votes | % | ±% |
|---|---|---|---|---|
| Liberal Democrats | Dinah Keal | 408 | | |
| Independent | David Jackson | 288 | | |
| Conservative | Patricia Moore | 284 | | |
| Liberal Democrats | Mags Normington | 216 | | |
| Turnout | | 1,196 | 27.7 | +0.6 |
| Liberal Democrats hold | | Swing | | |
| Independent hold | | Swing | | |

Pickering East
| Party | Candidate | Votes | % | ±% |
|---|---|---|---|---|
| Liberal Democrats | Arthur Aslett | uncontested | | |
| Liberal Democrats hold | | Swing | | |

Pickering West (2)
| Party | Candidate | Votes | % | ±% |
|---|---|---|---|---|
| Conservative | Linda Cowling | uncontested | | |
| Independent | Natalie Warriner | uncontested | | |
| Conservative hold | | Swing | | |
| Independent hold | | Swing | | |

Rillington
| Party | Candidate | Votes | % | ±% |
|---|---|---|---|---|
| Independent | Brian Maud | uncontested | | |
| Independent hold | | Swing | | |

Ryedale South West
| Party | Candidate | Votes | % | ±% |
|---|---|---|---|---|
| Conservative | Keith Knaggs | 442 | 78.9 | +1.4 |
| Liberal Democrats | Allison Kerrison | 118 | 21.1 | −1.4 |
| Majority | | 224 | 57.8 | +2.8 |
| Turnout | | 560 | 42.6 | −2.1 |
| Conservative hold | | Swing | | |

Sherburn
| Party | Candidate | Votes | % | ±% |
|---|---|---|---|---|
| Conservative | John Raper | 316 | 55.4 | +1.2 |
| Liberal Democrats | Anne Pilgrim | 254 | 44.6 | −1.2 |
| Majority | | 62 | 10.8 | +2.4 |
| Turnout | | 570 | 39.2 | +1.2 |
| Conservative hold | | Swing | | |

Sheriff Hutton
| Party | Candidate | Votes | % | ±% |
|---|---|---|---|---|
| Conservative | Robert Wood | 386 | 51.3 | +35.7 |
| Independent | Gillian Stilwell | 367 | 48.7 | −35.7 |
| Majority | | 19 | 2.6 | |
| Turnout | | 753 | 54.9 | +0.6 |
| Conservative gain from Independent | | Swing | | |

Sinnington
| Party | Candidate | Votes | % | ±% |
|---|---|---|---|---|
| Conservative | Snowy Windress | 405 | 62.0 | −6.4 |
| Liberal Democrats | Martin Baxter | 248 | 38.0 | +6.4 |
| Majority | | 157 | 24.0 | −12.8 |
| Turnout | | 653 | 47.0 | +1.6 |
| Conservative hold | | Swing | | |

Thornton Dale (2)
| Party | Candidate | Votes | % | ±% |
|---|---|---|---|---|
| Conservative | Geoffrey Acomb | 617 | | |
| Liberal Democrats | Jane Fenton | 540 | | |
| Conservative | Claire Hundsal | 465 | | |
| Independent | David Porter | 437 | | |
| Turnout | | 2,059 | 46.6 | +3.1 |
| Conservative gain from Independent | | Swing | | |
| Liberal Democrats hold | | Swing | | |

Wolds
| Party | Candidate | Votes | % | ±% |
|---|---|---|---|---|
| Conservative | Edward Legard | 377 | 61.8 | |
| Liberal Democrats | Michael Beckett | 233 | 38.2 | |
| Majority | | 144 | 23.6 | |
| Turnout | | 610 | 45.1 | |
| Conservative hold | | Swing | | |
