= 2015 Ryedale District Council election =

2015 UK local government election

Map of the results

The 2015 Ryedale District Council election took place on 7 May 2015 to elect members of the Ryedale District Council in England. It was held on the same day as other local elections.

== Party results ==
Ryedale local election result 2015
| Party | Seats | Gains | Losses | Net gain/loss | Seats % | Votes % | Votes | +/− |
|---|---|---|---|---|---|---|---|---|
| Conservative | 20 | 2 | 2 | 0 | 66.6 | 45.1 | 16,943 | -3.2 |
| Independent | 5 | 2 | 1 | +1 | 16.6 | 18.4 | 6,911 | +2.7 |
| Liberal | 3 | 0 | 1 | -1 | 10.0 | 11.3 | 4,234 | +7.0 |
| Liberal Democrats | 2 | 1 | 1 | 0 | 6.6 | 6.5 | 2,459 | -23.7 |
| Green | 0 | 0 | 0 | 0 | 0.0 | 7.4 | 2,794 | +7.4 |
| Labour | 0 | 0 | 0 | 0 | 0.0 | 6.3 | 2,369 | +6.3 |
| UKIP | 0 | 0 | 0 | 0 | 0.0 | 5.0 | 1,875 | +5.0 |

The Conservative Party fielded 26 candidates for the 30 vacancies - 20 of whom were elected. There were 13 Independent candidates with 5 elected. Two Independent Groups were formed on the Council - one with the three members for Malton and one with the two members for Hovingham and Rillington. The Liberal Party fielded 10 candidates with 3 elected and the Liberal Democrats fielded 6 candidates with 2 elected.

The Green Party fielded 8 candidates, none of whom were elected. Likewise, the Labour Party fielded 7 unsuccessful candidates and the UK Independence Party fielded 6 unsuccessful candidates.

== Ward results ==
30 Members were elected across 20 Wards.

Amotherby
| Party | Candidate | Votes | % | ±% |
|---|---|---|---|---|
| Conservative | Fiona Farnell | 570 | 54 | |
| Independent | Darren Allanson | 485 | 46 | |
| Turnout | | 1055 | 69 | {{{change}}} |
| Conservative hold | | Swing | {{{swing}}} | |

Ampleforth
| Party | Candidate | Votes | % | ±% |
|---|---|---|---|---|
| Conservative | Jim Bailey | 619 | 65 | |
| Green | Barbara Hickman | 334 | 35 | |
| Turnout | | 953 | 72 | {{{change}}} |
| Conservative hold | | Swing | {{{swing}}} | |

Cropton
| Party | Candidate | Votes | % | ±% |
|---|---|---|---|---|
| Liberal | John Clark | 526 | 53 | |
| Conservative | Lorraine Allanson | 471 | 47 | |
| Turnout | | 997 | 77 | {{{change}}} |
| Liberal hold | | Swing | {{{swing}}} | |

Dales
| Party | Candidate | Votes | % | ±% |
|---|---|---|---|---|
| Conservative | Janet Frank | 534 | 66 | |
| Liberal | Nelly Trevelyan | 281 | 34 | |
| Turnout | | 815 | 74 | {{{change}}} |
| Conservative hold | | Swing | {{{swing}}} | |

Derwent (2)
| Party | Candidate | Votes | % | ±% |
|---|---|---|---|---|
| Conservative | Michael Cleary | 1077 | 35 | |
| Conservative | Phil Evans | 750 | 25 | |
| Independent | Stephen Shaw | 659 | 22 | |
| Liberal Democrats | Abigail Stokell-Beckett | 574 | 19 | |
| Turnout | | 3,060 | 71 | {{{change}}} |
| Conservative hold | | Swing | {{{swing}}} | |
| Conservative hold | | Swing | {{{swing}}} | |

Helmsley (2)
| Party | Candidate | Votes | % | ±% |
|---|---|---|---|---|
| Conservative | Steve Arnold | 982 | 35 | |
| Conservative | Snowy Windress | 832 | 30 | |
| Independent | George Hawkins | 584 | 21 | |
| Green | Erica Rose | 407 | 15 | |
| Turnout | | 2,805 | 65 | {{{change}}} |
| Conservative hold | | Swing | {{{swing}}} | |
| Conservative hold | | Swing | {{{swing}}} | |

Hovingham
| Party | Candidate | Votes | % | ±% |
|---|---|---|---|---|
| Independent | Robert Wainwright | 599 | 58 | |
| Green | Nicholas Burton | 439 | 42 | |
| Turnout | | 1,038 | 72 | {{{change}}} |
| Independent hold | | Swing | {{{swing}}} | |

Kirkbymoorside (2)
| Party | Candidate | Votes | % | ±% |
|---|---|---|---|---|
| Conservative | Bob Gardiner | 763 | 25 | |
| Conservative | David Cussons | 757 | 25 | |
| Green | Martin Brampton | 477 | 15 | |
| Labour | Jill Wells | 436 | 14 | |
| Liberal | Luke Richardson | 374 | 12 | |
| Liberal | Nicky Hollins | 280 | 9 | |
| Turnout | | 3,087 | 66 | {{{change}}} |
| Conservative gain from Liberal | | Swing | {{{swing}}} | |
| Conservative hold | | Swing | {{{swing}}} | |

Malton (3)
| Party | Candidate | Votes | % | ±% |
|---|---|---|---|---|
| Independent | Lindsay Burr | 1020 | 18 | |
| Independent | Paul Andrews | 838 | 15 | |
| Independent | Ed Jowitt | 664 | 12 | |
| Conservative | Kerry Ennis | 624 | 11 | |
| Conservative | David Hoggard | 566 | 10 | |
| Conservative | Ann Hopkinson | 558 | 10 | |
| UKIP | Peter Ash | 532 | 9 | |
| Labour | Sam Prest | 456 | 8 | |
| Labour | Tim Prest | 385 | 7 | |
| Turnout | | 5,643 | 63 | {{{change}}} |
| Independent hold | | Swing | {{{swing}}} | |
| Independent gain from Liberal Democrats | | Swing | {{{swing}}} | |
| Independent gain from Conservative | | Swing | {{{swing}}} | |

- Lindsay Burr was previously elected as a Liberal Democrat and retained her seat.

Norton East (2)
| Party | Candidate | Votes | % | ±% |
|---|---|---|---|---|
| Conservative | Keane Duncan | 745 | 29 | |
| Liberal Democrats | Elizabeth Shields | 440 | 17 | |
| UKIP | Kevin Anderson | 402 | 16 | |
| Liberal Democrats | Ben Mehrtens | 320 | 13 | |
| Conservative | Jane Harrison | 319 | 13 | |
| Independent | Ray King | 309 | 12 | |
| Turnout | | 2,535 | 53 | {{{change}}} |
| Conservative gain from Independent | | Swing | {{{swing}}} | |
| Liberal Democrats hold | | Swing | {{{swing}}} | |

Norton West (2)
| Party | Candidate | Votes | % | ±% |
|---|---|---|---|---|
| Conservative | Luke Ives | 704 | 23 | |
| Liberal Democrats | Di Keal | 631 | 20 | |
| Conservative | Liz Johnson | 518 | 17 | |
| Independent | Jeremy Powell | 388 | 13 | |
| Liberal Democrats | Howard Keal | 325 | 11 | |
| UKIP | Philip Mooring | 200 | 6 | |
| UKIP | Chris Cooper | 181 | 6 | |
| Liberal | Alasdair Clark | 82 | 3 | |
| Liberal | Eddie Thornton | 52 | 2 | |
| Turnout | | 3,081 | 63 | {{{change}}} |
| Conservative hold | | Swing | {{{swing}}} | |
| Liberal Democrats gain from Conservative | | Swing | {{{swing}}} | |

Pickering East (2)
| Party | Candidate | Votes | % | ±% |
|---|---|---|---|---|
| Conservative | Will Oxley | 739 | 26 | |
| Liberal | Joy Andrews | 643 | 23 | |
| Liberal | Tommy Woodward | 496 | 18 | |
| Independent | Susan Cowan | 373 | 13 | |
| Labour | Eileen Randall | 247 | 9 | |
| Liberal Democrats | Jane Haigh | 169 | 6 | |
| Independent | Charles Hopkinson | 163 | 6 | |
| Turnout | | 2,830 | 64 | {{{change}}} |
| Conservative hold | | Swing | {{{swing}}} | |
| Liberal hold | | Swing | {{{swing}}} | |

Pickering West (2)
| Party | Candidate | Votes | % | ±% |
|---|---|---|---|---|
| Liberal | Tim Thornton | 893 | 34 | |
| Conservative | Linda Cowling | 817 | 31 | |
| Liberal | Mike Potter | 607 | 23 | |
| Labour | Geoff Randall | 314 | 12 | |
| Turnout | | 2,631 | 66 | {{{change}}} |
| Liberal hold | | Swing | {{{swing}}} | |
| Conservative hold | | Swing | {{{swing}}} | |

Rillington
| Party | Candidate | Votes | % | ±% |
|---|---|---|---|---|
| Independent | Brian Maud | 492 | 57 | |
| UKIP | Trevor Golding | 220 | 26 | |
| Green | Janice Every | 145 | 17 | |
| Turnout | | 857 | 63 | {{{change}}} |
| Independent hold | | Swing | {{{swing}}} | |

Ryedale South West
| Party | Candidate | Votes | % | ±% |
|---|---|---|---|---|
| Conservative | Caroline Goodrick | unopposed | | |
| Conservative hold | | Swing | {{{swing}}} | |

Sherburn
| Party | Candidate | Votes | % | ±% |
|---|---|---|---|---|
| Conservative | John Raper | 464 | 47 | |
| UKIP | Barry Waite | 340 | 34 | |
| Green | Selma Khan | 193 | 19 | |
| Turnout | | 997 | 65 | {{{change}}} |
| Conservative hold | | Swing | {{{swing}}} | |

Sheriff Hutton
| Party | Candidate | Votes | % | ±% |
|---|---|---|---|---|
| Conservative | Eric Hope | 726 | 68 | |
| Independent | Chris Pickles | 337 | 32 | |
| Turnout | | 1063 | 77 | {{{change}}} |
| Conservative hold | | Swing | {{{swing}}} | |

Sinnington
| Party | Candidate | Votes | % | ±% |
|---|---|---|---|---|
| Conservative | Val Arnold | 664 | 63 | |
| Green | Glyn Wild | 289 | 27 | |
| Labour | Mike Martin | 106 | 10 | |
| Turnout | | 1,059 | 73 | {{{change}}} |
| Conservative hold | | Swing | {{{swing}}} | |

Thornton Dale (2)
| Party | Candidate | Votes | % | ±% |
|---|---|---|---|---|
| Conservative | Geoff Acomb | 1099 | 36 | |
| Conservative | Janet Sanderson | 1045 | 34 | |
| Green | Sandra Bell | 510 | 17 | |
| Labour | Mick Johnston | 425 | 14 | |
| Turnout | | 3,079 | 93 | {{{change}}} |
| Conservative hold | | Swing | {{{swing}}} | |
| Conservative hold | | Swing | {{{swing}}} | |

Wolds
| Party | Candidate | Votes | % | ±% |
|---|---|---|---|---|
| Conservative | Tharik Jainu-Deen | unopposed | | |
| Conservative hold | | Swing | {{{swing}}} | |
