= 1999 Ryedale District Council election =

1999 UK local government election

The 1999 Ryedale District Council election to the Ryedale District Council was held on 6 May 1999. The whole council was up for election and the council stayed under no overall control.

== Election result ==
Ryedale local election result 1999
Party	Seats	Gains	Losses	Net gain/loss	Seats %	Votes %	Votes	+/−
Conservative	11			+6	47.8			
Independent	6			-3	26.1			
Liberal Democrats	5			-3	21.7			
Labour	1			0	4.3			
