= Mayor of York and North Yorkshire =

Elected mayor in England

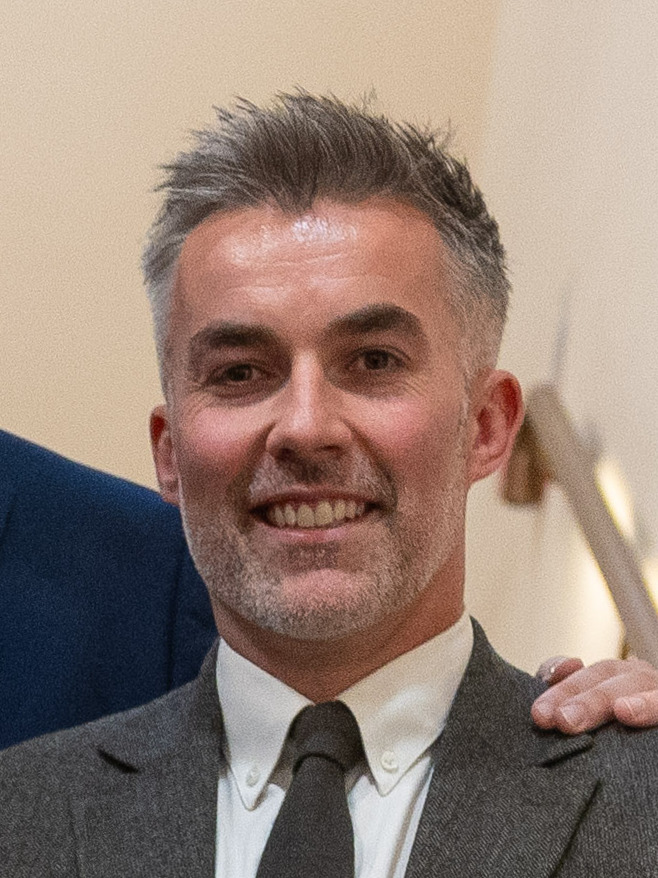
- Incumbent; David Skaith since 7 May 2024
- Style: Mayor
- Appointer: Electorate of York and North Yorkshire
- Term length: Four years
- Inaugural holder: David Skaith
- Formation: 7 May 2024
- Website: https://yorknorthyorks-ca.gov.uk/mayor/

The mayor of York and North Yorkshire is the strategic authority mayor of the York and North Yorkshire Combined Authority covering the City of York and North Yorkshire unitary authority areas and was elected for the first time in May 2024.

An agreement signed on 1 August 2022 (Yorkshire Day) by Greg Clark, Secretary of State for Levelling Up, Housing and Communities, and leaders of City of York Council and North Yorkshire County Council, created a new combined authority across the region led by a directly elected mayor who has the power to spend public money on local priorities such as transport, education and housing and who will be vested with the police and crime commissioner functions for the North Yorkshire Police area from 7 May 2024.

The mayor will receive an annual allowance of £81,300, which will be reviewed in May 2025. The election in May 2024 was won by the Labour candidate David Skaith.

== Powers and responsibilities ==
=== Policing and crime ===
The North Yorkshire Police, Fire and Crime Commissioner was an elected official tasked with supervising North Yorkshire Police and North Yorkshire Fire and Rescue Service. The position, which replaced the North Yorkshire Police Authority, was created in November 2012, following an election held on 15 November 2012, and was first held by Julia Mulligan. It replaced the North Yorkshire Fire Authority. It became defunct in May 2021, its powers and responsibility being transferred to the mayor of York and North Yorkshire as a part of the York and North Yorkshire Yorkshire Devolution deal as signed by Greg Clark, and the two leaders of the constituent councils. As of the Election result of the mayor in 2024, the role is incorporated into the mayor's responsibilities, with the power to appoint a deputy mayor to support in this role.

Deputy Mayor of York and North Yorkshire for Policing, Fire and Crime
Name	Term start	Term end
Jo Coles	8 July 2024	

=== Intergovernmental relations ===
The mayor is a member of the Mayoral Council for England and the Council of the Nations and Regions.

== List of mayors ==
Name	Term of office		Elected	Political party
David Skaith	7 May 2024	Incumbent	2024	Labour and Co-operative
