= Mayor of Hull and East Yorkshire =

Elected head of local government body in England

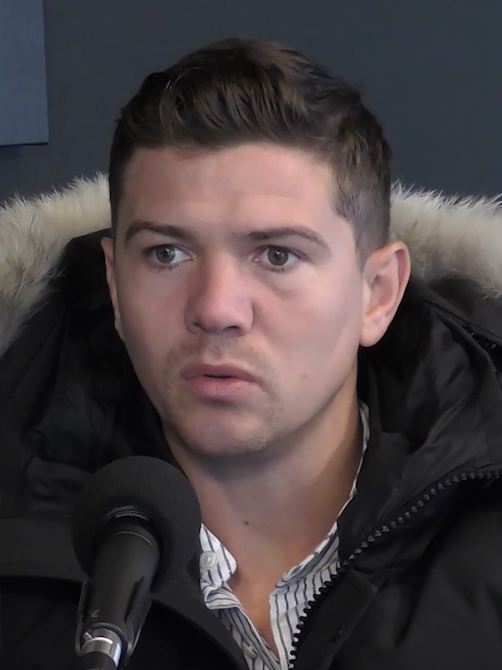
- Incumbent; Luke Campbell since 6 May 2025
- Style: Mayor
- Member of: Hull and East Yorkshire Combined Authority
- Appointer: Electorate of Hull and East Yorkshire
- Term length: Four years
- Inaugural holder: Luke Campbell
- Formation: 6 May 2025

The mayor of Hull and East Yorkshire is the strategic authority mayor who leads the Hull and East Yorkshire Combined Authority. The body, a combined authority, is responsible for the strategic administration of Hull and East Yorkshire.

The first mayoral election was held in 2025 and the first elected mayor was Luke Campbell of Reform UK.

The mayoralty covers the whole of the ceremonial county of the East Riding of Yorkshire, including the Hull City Council and East Riding of Yorkshire Council administrative areas.

== Elections ==
=== Elections in the 2020s ===
2025 Hull and East Yorkshire mayoral election
Party	Candidate	Votes	%
Reform	Luke Campbell	48,941	35.8
Liberal Democrats	Mike Ross	37,510	27.7
Conservative	Anne Handley	21,393	15.8
Labour	Margaret Pinder	18,568	13.7
Green	Kerry Harrison	5,049	3.7
Yorkshire	Rowan Halstead	4,372	3.2
Majority		10,981	8.1
Rejected ballots		317	
Turnout		135,383	29.8
Reform win (new seat)			
