= David Skaith =

British politician (born 1985)

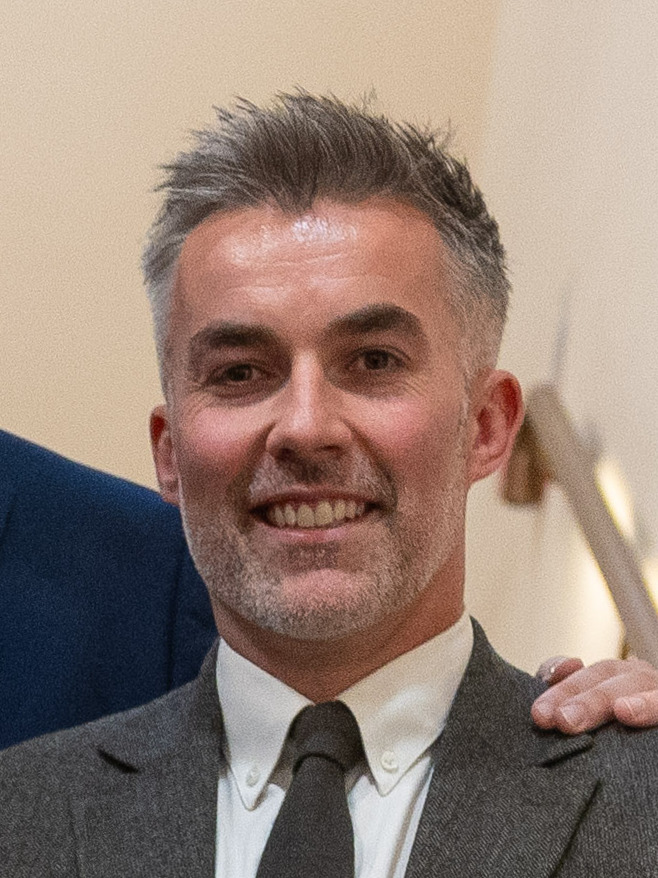
- Skaith in 2024

Mayor of York and North Yorkshire
- Incumbent
- Assumed office 7 May 2024
- Preceded by: Office established

Personal details
- Born: David Robert Skaith; December 1985 (age 40) Harrogate, North Yorkshire, England
- Party: Labour Co-op
- Spouse: Alice Skaith
- Children: 2
- Education: York St John University

David Robert Skaith (born December 1985) is a British Labour and Co-operative Party politician who has served as the strategic authority mayor for York and North Yorkshire since May 2024.

== Early life ==
Skaith was born in December 1985. He was raised in Harrogate and was a keen cricketer in his youth before studying sport at York St John University.

== Career ==
He moved to Brighton while his future wife studied to be a teacher before returning to North Yorkshire where he started a small business, Winstons of York menswear store, in York in 2015 and, in the same year, joined the Labour Party. He also served as the chair of the York High Street Forum.

Skaith resolved to get into politics after his father died during the Covid pandemic. He unsuccessfully stood for election for City of York Council in May 2023 before being elected as the first-ever mayor of York and North Yorkshire in May 2024. Campaign pledges included turning the A1237 road into a dual carriageway, expanding affordable housing and more police and police community support officers.

== Personal life ==
Skaith is married to Alice; they have two children, and live in Wheldrake. His brother is a police officer in Harrogate.

He is dyslexic and has a stammer.
