= Middlesbrough Development Corporation =

Regeneration body in England

Middlesbrough Development Corporation (MDC)
- Formation: 27 February 2023
- Type: Mayoral development corporation
- Purpose: Regeneration
- Region served: Middlesbrough, Teesside
- Chair: Ben Houchen
- Parent organization: Tees Valley Combined Authority

Middlesbrough Development Corporation (MDC) is a publicly-owned mayoral development corporation created to fund, manage, and accelerate regeneration in Middlesbrough town centre and Middlehaven, England.

It was established on 27 February 2023 by statutory instrument 2023/103, and is a part of Tees Valley Combined Authority, with board comprising elected and private-sector members.

== History ==
The establishment was first proposed in August 2022 by the Tees Valley Combined Authority as a publicly owned statutory body with increased powers (including planning, business rate relief, and acquisition of land by compulsory purchase order). Initially, the corporation was planned to be in operation by the end of 2022.

The proposals included £10 million of investment from the Tees Valley Combined Authority, as well as £8 million from the Department for Levelling Up, Housing and Communities to transform the area of Gresham. Following the consultation, a shadow board for the corporation was established comprising elected and private-sector members from:

- Tees Valley Combined Authority (mayor Ben Houchen, a chief executive)
- Middlesbrough Council (mayor Andy Preston, deputy mayor, a chief executive) (Note: Initially both Preston and the deputy mayor were to serve on the board in a personal capacity, however this was since renegotiated.)
- Cleveland Police (commissioner Steve Turner, a chief constable)
- Teesside University (vice chair)
- and a member of a local non-profit youth organisation

At a meeting on 24 February 2023, Middlesbrough Council voted 16 to 12 in a non-binding vote against the planned development corporation. All 16 Labour party councillors opposed the plans, and many councillors (including mayor Andy Preston) did not attend. The major concerns voiced were around a loss of planning powers for the council, the transfer of council assets to the new entity, and a 'lack of expertise' on the board. The proposed council assets for transfer to the MDC include:

- Middlehaven – including brownfield sites, Middlesbrough Dock, and surrounding land of around 40 acres
- Middlesbrough bus station
- The Crown (former pub) and neighbouring units (Linthorpe Road)
- Broadcasting House Enterprise Centre and freehold of Sainsbury's site (Wilson Street)
- Units under A66 along Wilson Street
- and a number of sites and council owned car parks (Station Street, Amber Street, Buxton Street, and Leonardo Hotel) earmarked for redevelopment.

On 27 February 2023, the Department for Levelling Up, Housing and Communities confirmed the development corporation would go ahead despite not receiving backing from Middlesbrough Council. The corporation was established by statutory instrument 2023/103. Middlesbrough MP Andy McDonald called it a “scandalous denial of democracy". However, the legislation came after 25 of the 46 councillors (54%) signed an open letter of support for the MDC sent to the secretary of state Michael Gove.

== See also ==
- South Tees Development Corporation
- Tees Valley Regeneration
