= Redcar =

Town in North Yorkshire, England

Coordinates: 54.618°N 1.069°W

- Town
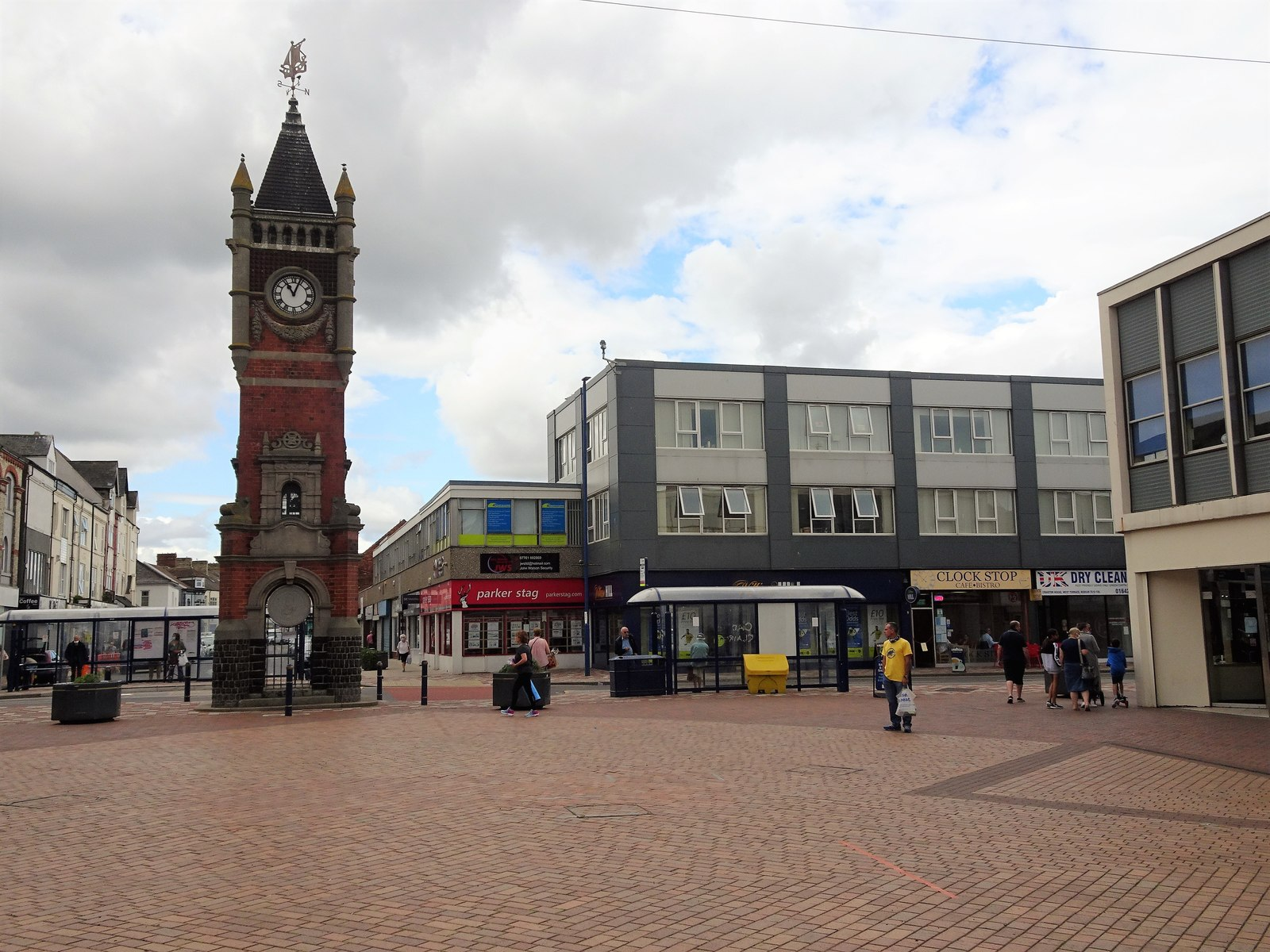
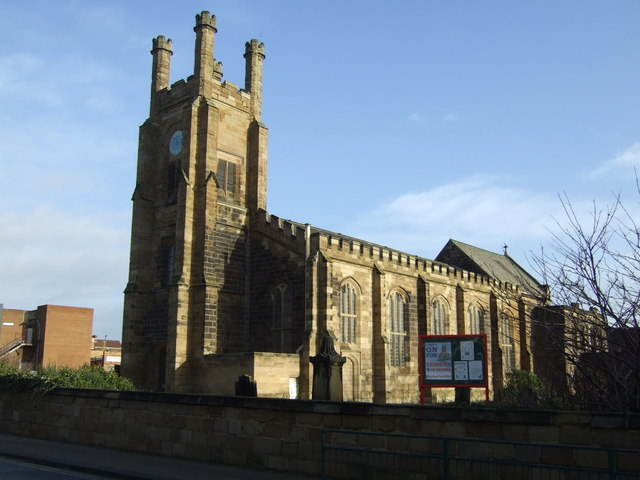
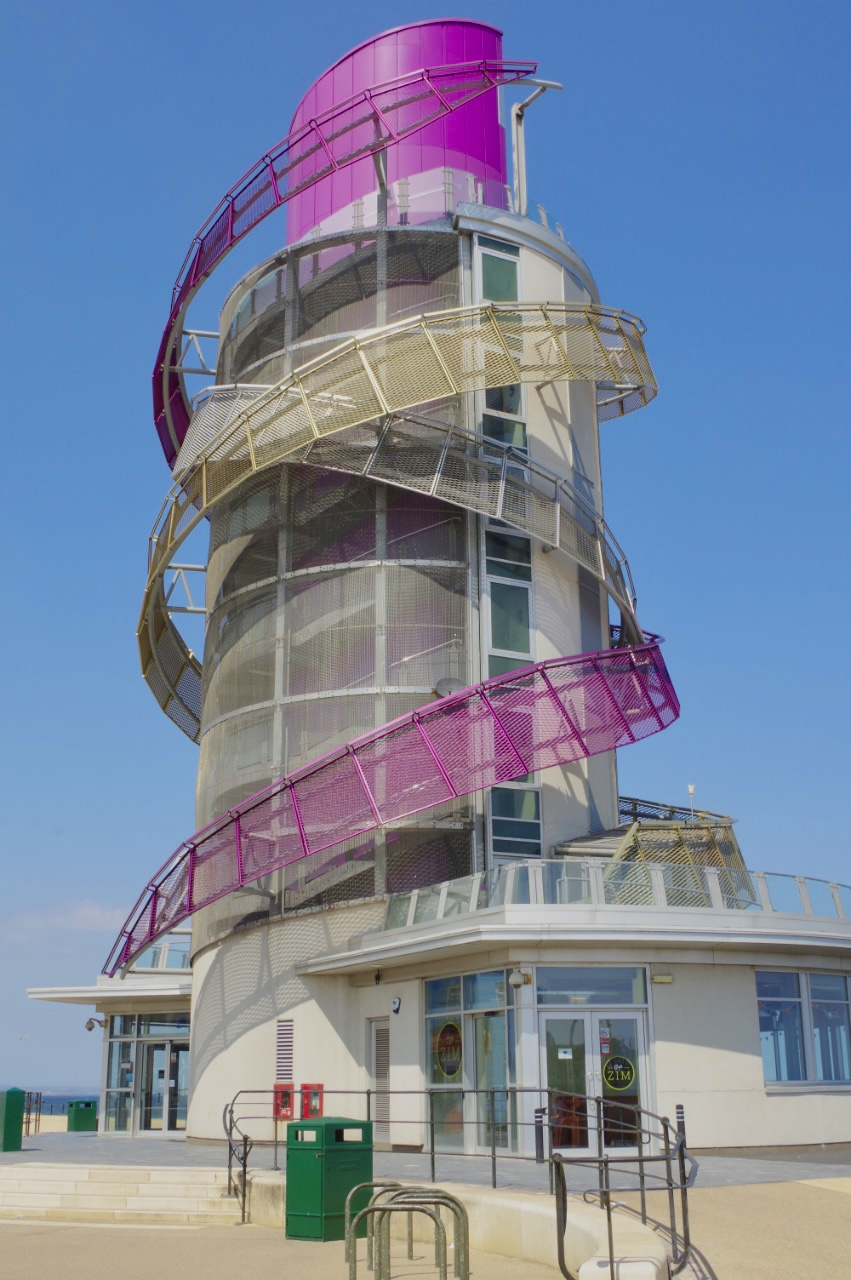
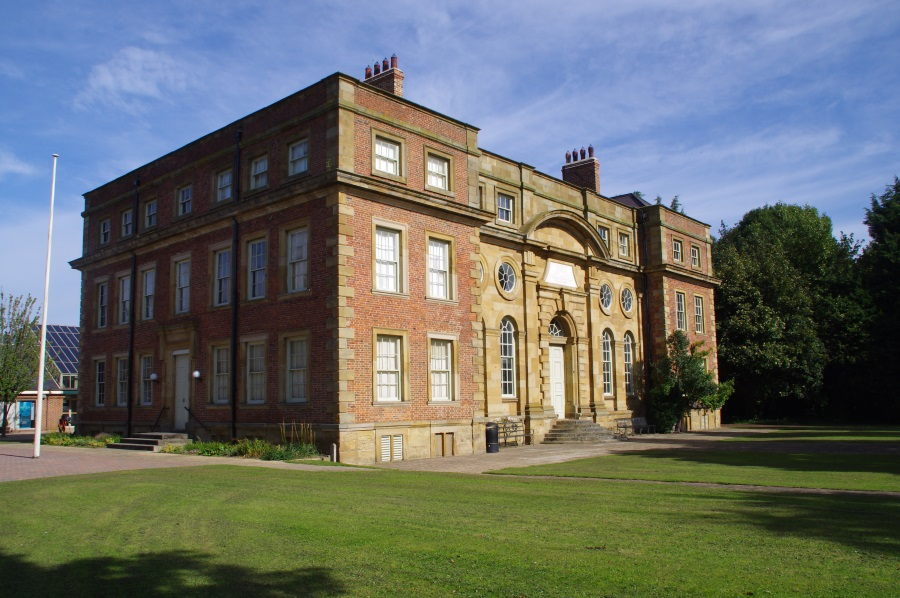
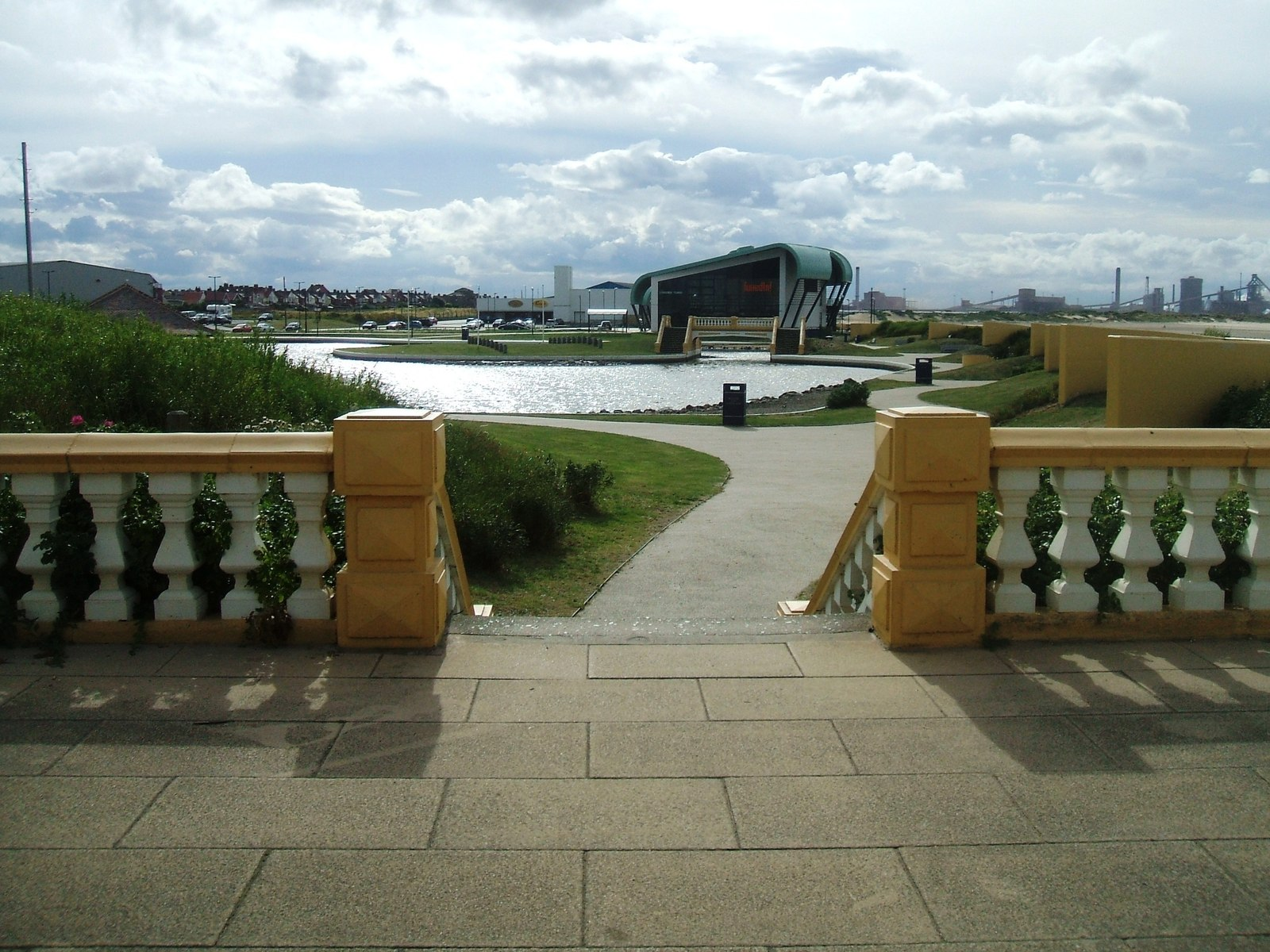
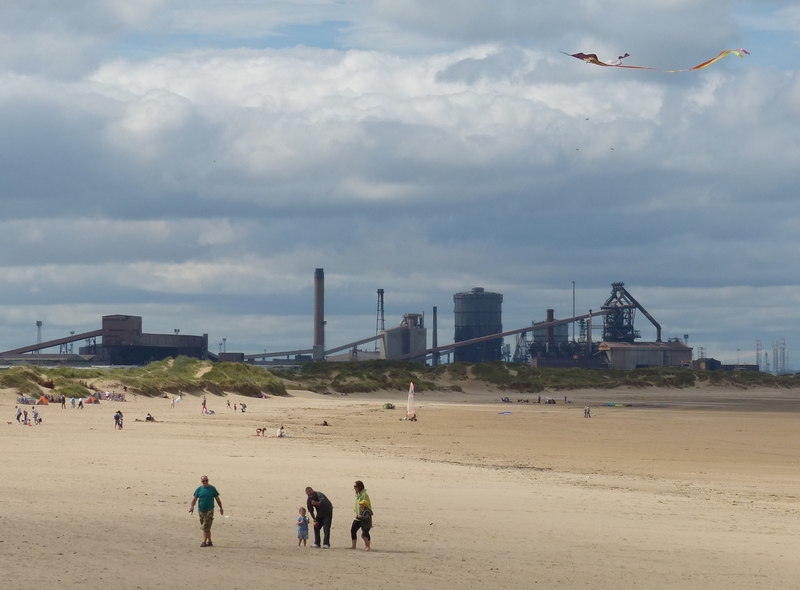
- The High Street St Peter's Church The Beacon Kirkleatham Hall Boating Lake Coatham Sands

- Location within North Yorkshire
- Population: 37,660
- OS grid reference: NZ601252
  - London: 220 mi (350 km) SSE
- Unitary authority: Redcar and Cleveland
- Ceremonial county: North Yorkshire
- Region: North East
- Country: England
- Sovereign state: United Kingdom
- Places: List: Coatham; Dormanstown; Kirkleatham; Warrenby
- Post town: REDCAR
- Postcode district: TS10–TS11
- Dialling code: 01642
- Police: Cleveland
- Fire: Cleveland
- Ambulance: North East
- UK Parliament: Redcar

Redcar /ˈrɛdkər/ /rɛdkɑːr/ is a seaside town on the Yorkshire Coast in the Redcar and Cleveland district. It is in the ceremonial county of North Yorkshire, England, and is located 7 miles (11 km) east of Middlesbrough.

The population of the Redcar (built-up area) was 37660 at the 2021 census. The town is made up of Coatham, Dormanstown, Kirkleatham, Newcomen, West Dyke, Wheatlands and Zetland.

It gained a town charter in 1922, from then until 1968 it was governed by the municipal borough of Redcar. Since the abolition of County Borough of Teesside, which existed from 1968 until 1974, the town has been unparished.

== History ==
=== Origins ===
Redcar occupies a low-lying site by the sea; the second element of its name is from Old Norse kjarr, meaning 'marsh', and the first may be either Old English (Anglo-Saxon) rēad meaning 'red' or OE hrēod 'reed'. The town originated as a fishing hamlet in the 14th century, trading with the larger adjacent hamlet of Coatham. Until the mid-19th century it was within the parish of Marske-by-the-Sea – mentioned in the Domesday Book of 1086.

=== Zetland lifeboat ===
Numerous ships have foundered off the Redcar coastline and many of their wrecks remain. The Zetland is the world's oldest surviving lifeboat. It was built by Henry Greathead of South Shields and is housed in a volunteer-led sea-front museum. The lifeboat was first stationed at Redcar in 1802.

=== Victorian era ===
As seaside holidays became fashionable in the early 19th century, Redcar's facilities expanded. By 1841, Redcar had 794 inhabitants. In 1846, work was completed on the Middlesbrough and Redcar Railway and the presently named Redcar Central station, created to attract tourism and trade.

Redcar's population expansion corresponded with Middlesbrough's, with the discovery in 1850 of iron ore in the Eston area of Cleveland Hills. Redcar prospered as a seaside town drawing tourists attracted by 8 miles (13 km) of sands stretching from South Gare to Saltburn-by-the-Sea.

Plans for a pier were drawn up in 1866, but lay dormant until prompted by the announcement of plans to build a pier at Coatham in 1871. Coatham Pier was wrecked before it was completed when two sailing ships were driven through it in a storm. It had to be shortened because of the cost of repairs and was re-opened with an entrance with two kiosks and a roller-skating rink on the Redcar side, and a bandstand halfway along its length.

Redcar Racecourse was created in 1875. Redcar Pier, another pier as well as Coatham Pier, was built in the late 1870s. In October 1880 the brig Luna caused £1,000 worth of damage to this pier. In New Year's Eve 1885 SS Cochrane demolished the landing stage. and in 1897 the schooner Amarant went through the pier. A year later, its head and bandstand burned down.

In October 1898 the Coatham Pier was almost wrecked when the barque Birger struck it and the pier was thereafter allowed to disintegrate. An anchor from the Birger can be seen on the sea front pavement close to the Zetland Lifeboat Museum.

In 1907 a pavilion ballroom was built on Redcar Pier behind the entrance kiosks and in 1928 it was extended. A glass house for concerts was added to the remains of Coatham Pier's entrance. The presently named Redcar East railway station was built in 1929.

In 1929 Coatham Pier's glasshouse was replaced by the New Pavilion theatre. After the war, comedian and entertainer Larry Grayson coined his catchphrase "Shut that Door!" while performing there, since the stage door was open to the cold North Sea breeze.

=== Second World War ===
Redcar Pier was deliberately breached (sectioned) in 1940 to prevent its use by enemy invasion forces. As a result of sectioning, damage by a mine explosion and deterioration it was never reconnected and instead allowed to become even more dilapidated.

=== Post war ===
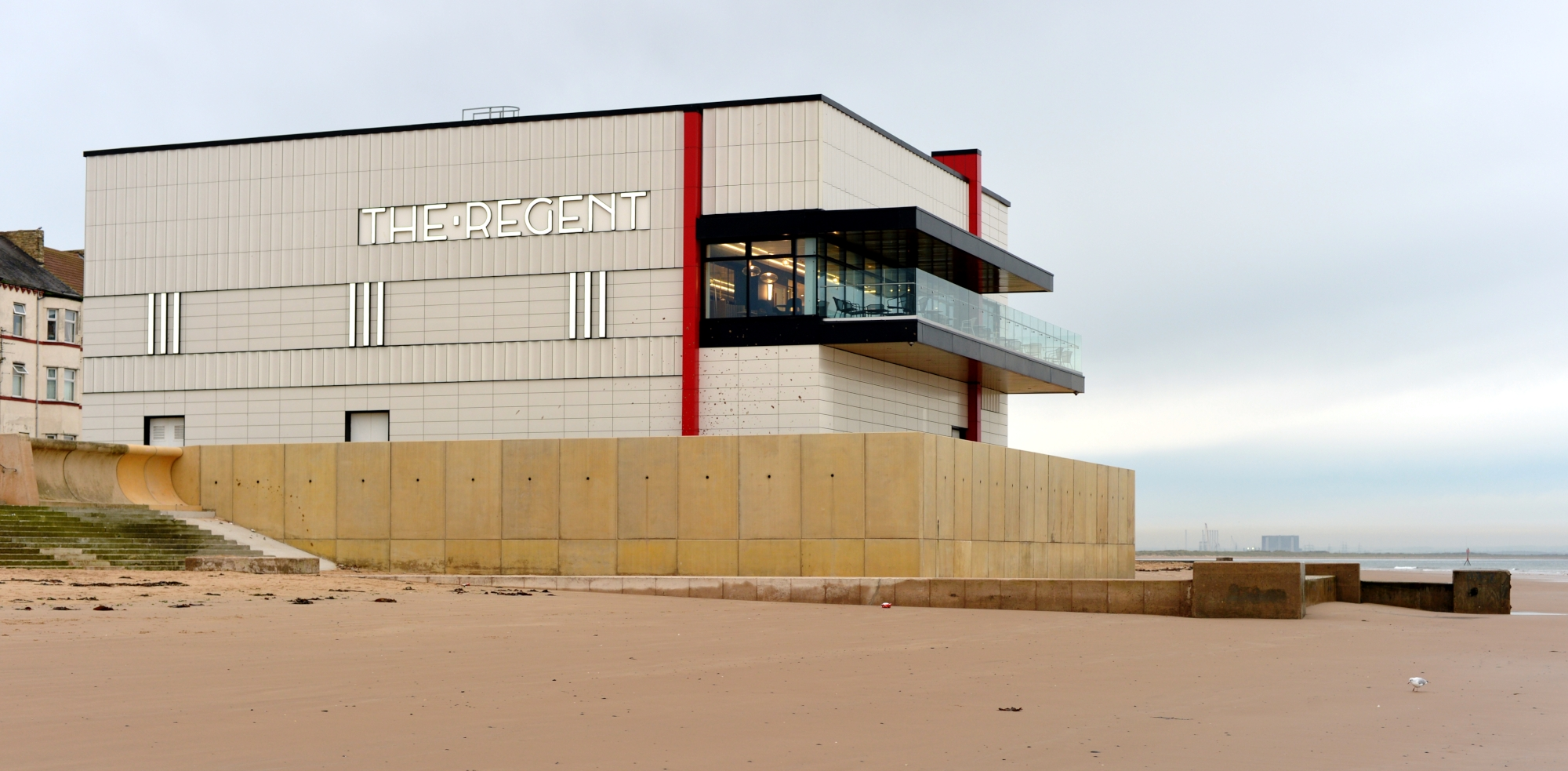
Regent Cinema at the location of Coatham Pier

In 1964 the New Pavilion Theatre was transformed into the Regent Cinema. The Redcar Pier pavilion continued in use after the war but storm damage led to it being declared unsafe and it was demolished in 1980–1981.

=== Redcar Steelworks ===
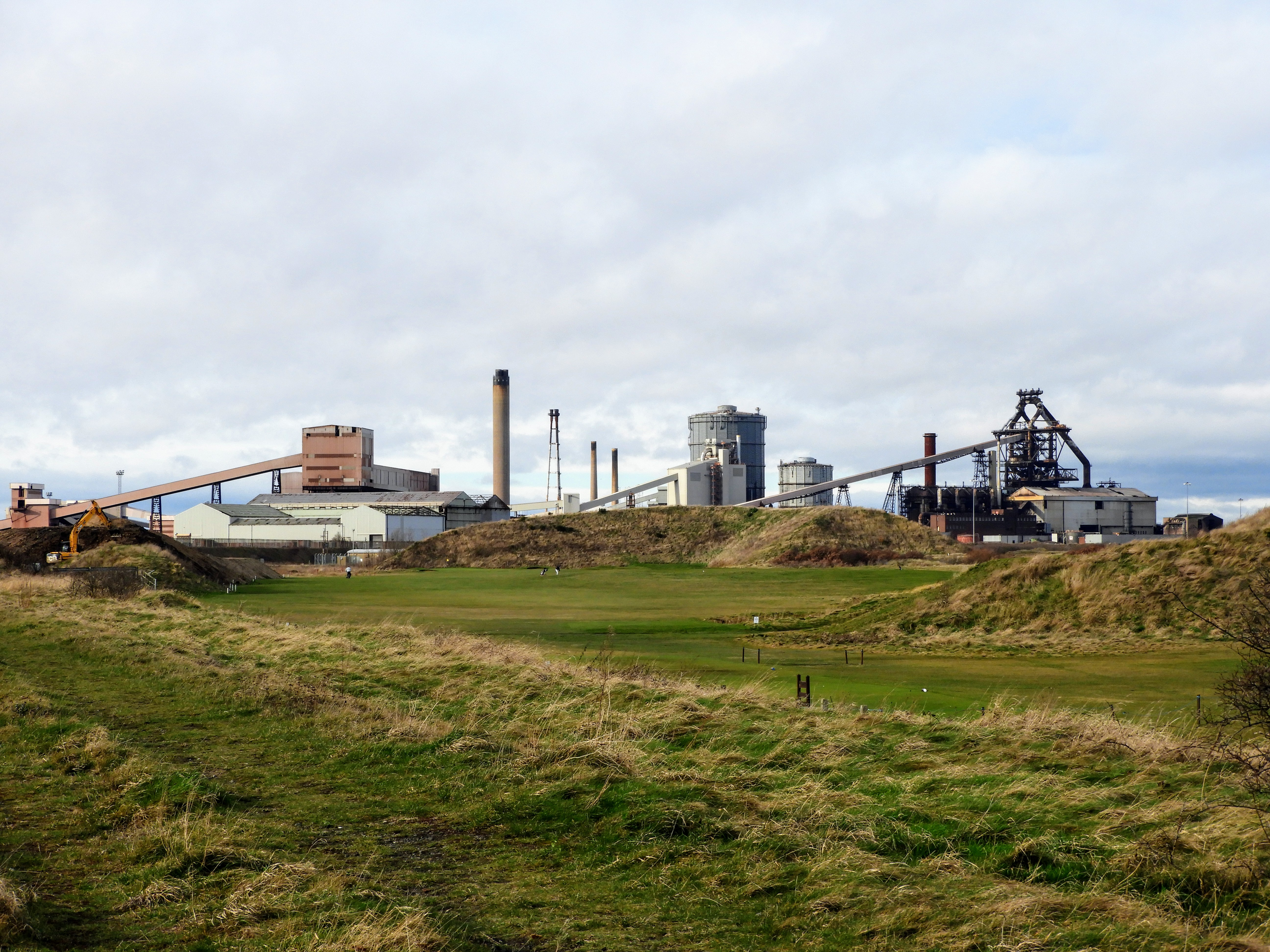
The steelworks in 2020

The town's main employers in the post-war era were the nearby Teesside Steelworks at Warrenby, founded by Dorman Long in 1917, and the ICI chemical works in Wilton. The steel produced at Dorman Long was used to build the Sydney Harbour Bridge, Tyne Bridge, Auckland Harbour Bridge and many others. At its height, the steelworks formed a continuous stretch along the south bank of the Tees, with 91 blast furnaces within a 10-mile radius of the area. The Redcar blast furnace, opened in 1979, was the second largest in Europe.

Both the Warrenby and Lackenby sites became part of Tata Steel when Corus was taken over in 2007, and the plant was mothballed in 2010. Sahaviriya Steel Industries (SSI) bought the plant from Tata Steel in 2011, for £320 million, and re-ignited the blast furnace. Production ceased again in 2015 with a loss of 1,700 jobs in the area.

== Governance ==
=== Wards and areas ===
Wards periodically change, as of 2018 the town is made up of Coatham, Dormanstown, Kirkleatham, Newcomen, West Dyke, Wheatlands and Zetland. Redcar is made up of areas that do not lend their name to a ward: Warrenby, Lakes Estate, Redcar East, The Ings, Ings Farm, Mickledales and Westfield.

=== Authority ===
Redcar was formerly a township and chapelry in the parishes of Marske and Upleatham. In 1866, Redcar became a separate civil parish. A district in Redcar's name formed in 1885. Three years after the district was formed, the centuries-old Yorkshire authority was replaced by the North Riding of Yorkshire county council. The district became an urban district in 1894.

The County Borough of Teesside is shown in red. Previous authorities are shown with dotted lines.

The settlement's town charter occurred in 1922, the district was able to be styled as a municipal borough and the settlement as a town. On 1 April 1974 the parish was abolished and merged with Teesside and Marske.

The 1974 reform created the non-metropolitan County of Cleveland, under the Langbaurgh non-metropolitan district. The county was also inserted into the North East England region. After further changes in 1996, the district became a unitary authority called Redcar and Cleveland in the ceremonial county of North Yorkshire, the county straddling two regions of England.

The North East England region was sub-divided into combined authorities. In May 2017, the Tees Valley which includes Redcar, elected its first mayor. Ben Houchen has been Tees Valley Mayor since 2017, winning the inaugural mayoral election in the combined authority. Houchen was re-elected in 2021 and won a third term in 2024.

=== Parliament ===
The town of Redcar is within the Redcar parliamentary constituency, which also includes neighbouring South Bank, Eston, Ormesby (part), Nunthorpe (part) and Guisborough.

Election	Member	Party
Feb 1974	James Tinn	Labour
1987	Mo Mowlam	Labour
2001	Vera Baird	Labour
2010	Ian Swales	Liberal Democrats
2015	Anna Turley	Labour Co-op
2019	Jacob Young	Conservative
2024	Anna Turley	Labour Co-op

== Culture and community ==
=== Culture ===
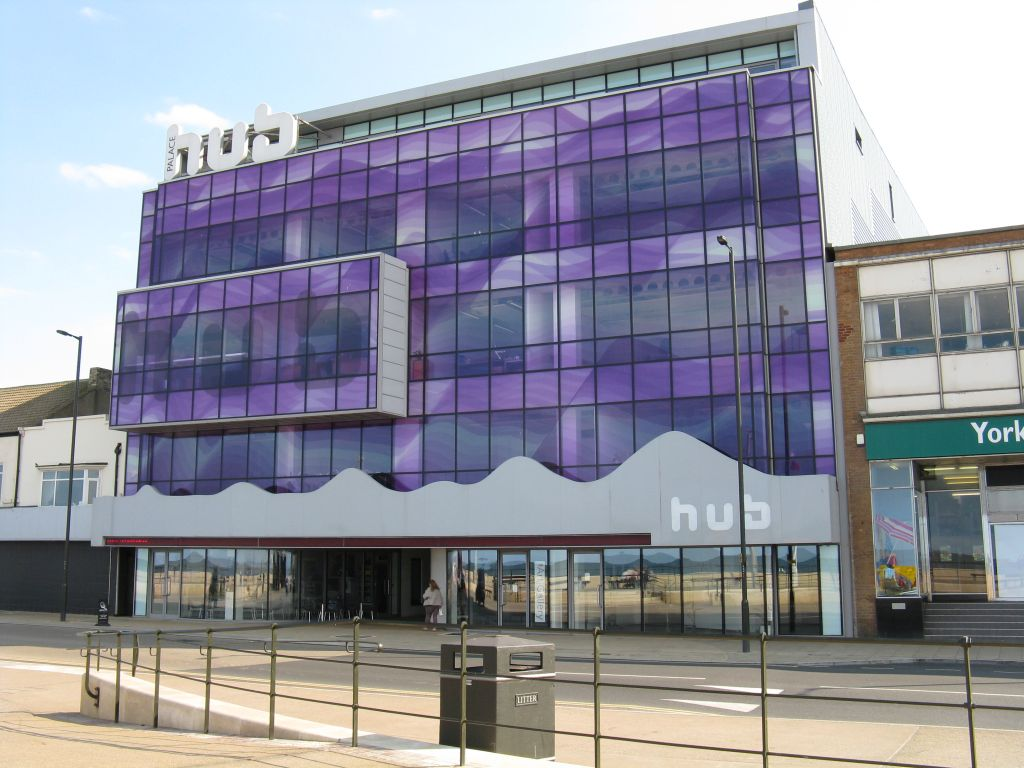
The Palace Hub Gallery and business start up centre

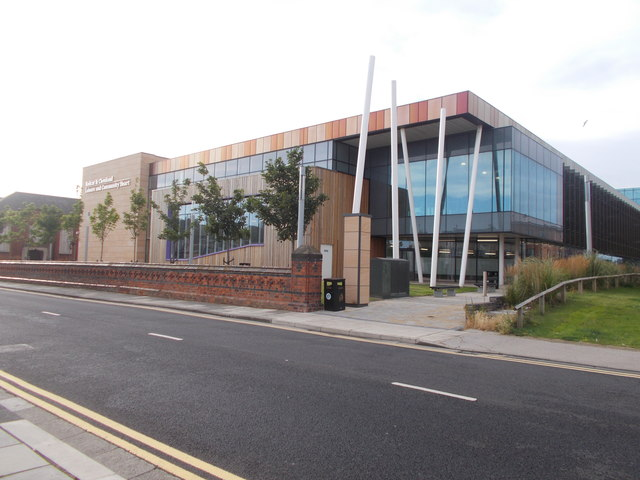
Redcar Leisure Centre

The Palace Hub, located on Redcar’s seafront, opened in 2013 as an £8.3 million development providing purpose-built business space for the creative industries. An art gallery and business start up centre are located in the building. The main library is in the Redcar Heart building in the centre of the town and there is a long-standing Redcar Literary Institute, which was founded in 1896.

Redcar is home to the Tuned In! Centre, which opened in 2012 and overlooks the sea front. The multi purpose venue hosts live music as well as creative workshops for young people. The annual event Clubland on the Beach, which showcases dance acts attracting visitors from across the country, has been held at Majuba Road in Redcar on a number of occasions starting in 2017.

=== Parks ===
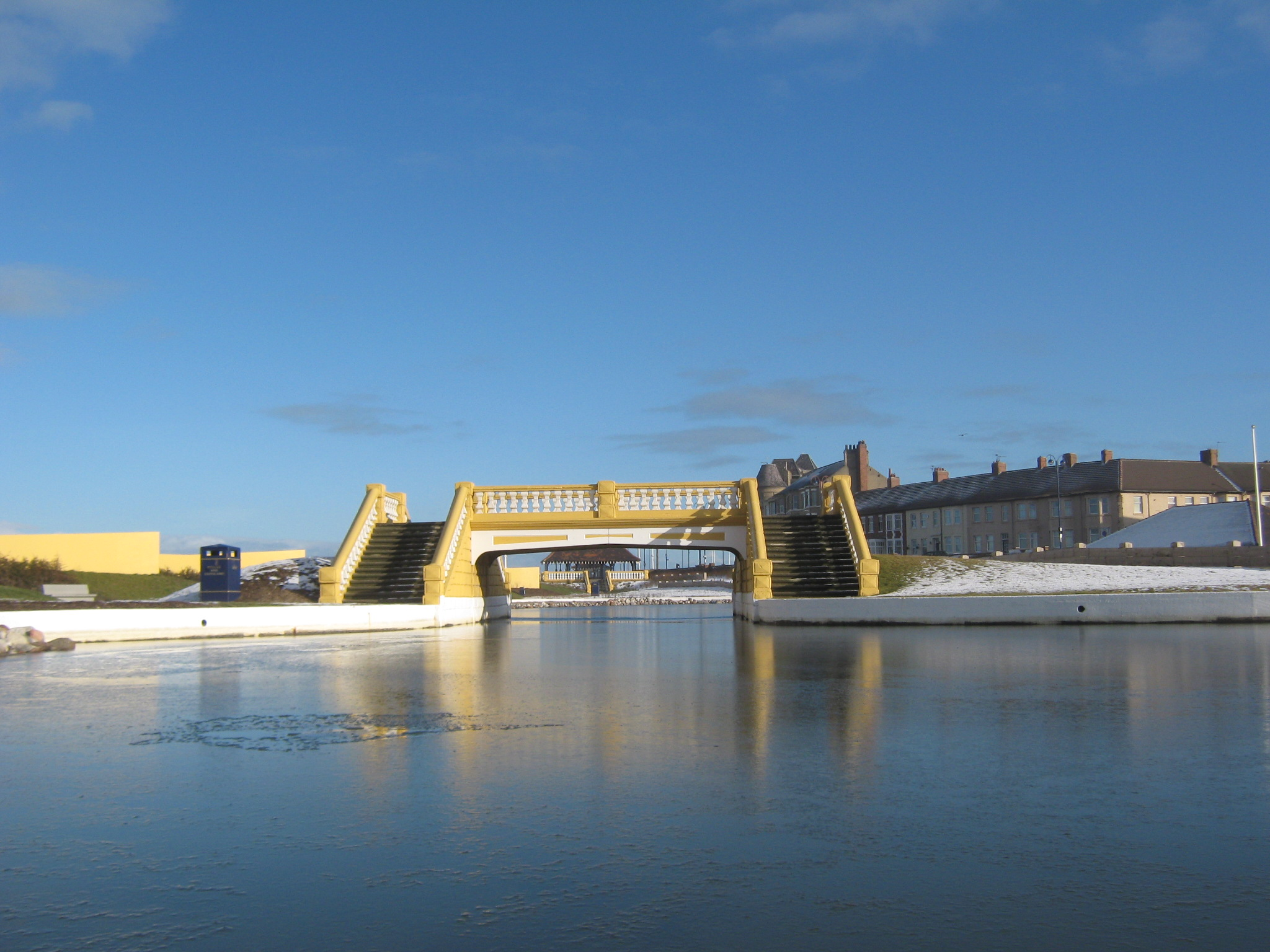
Coatham Enclosure boating lake

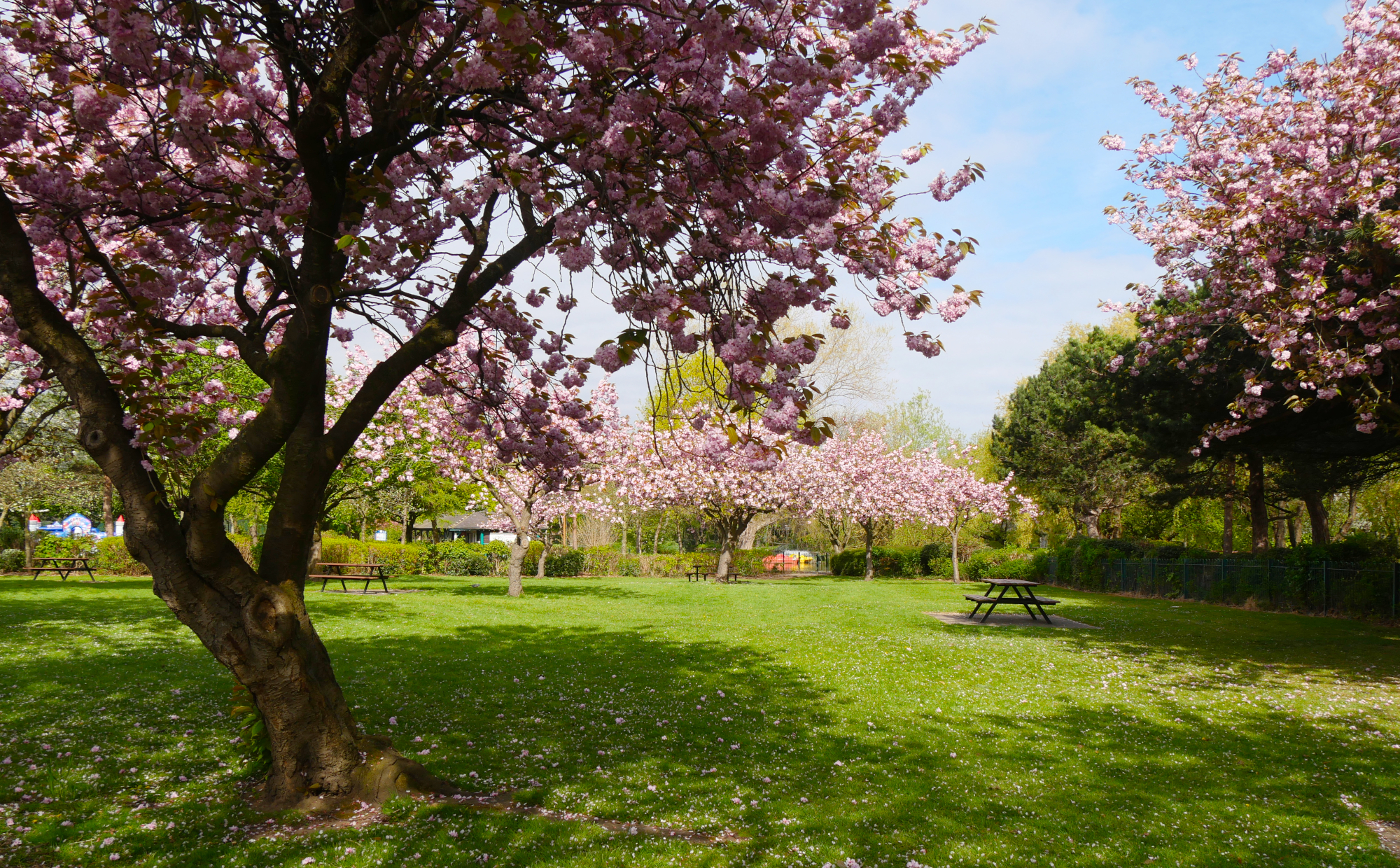
Locke Park

The town has had several parks built for tourism: Coatham Enclosure, Locke Park, Zetland Park, Borough Park, Lily Park, an Amusement Park with a roller coaster, and a small sea front park known locally as Titty Bottle Park. The Amusement Park near the railway closed decades ago, and Titty Bottle Park was absorbed into the redeveloped sea front around Redcar Beacon.

== Landmarks ==
=== Towers ===
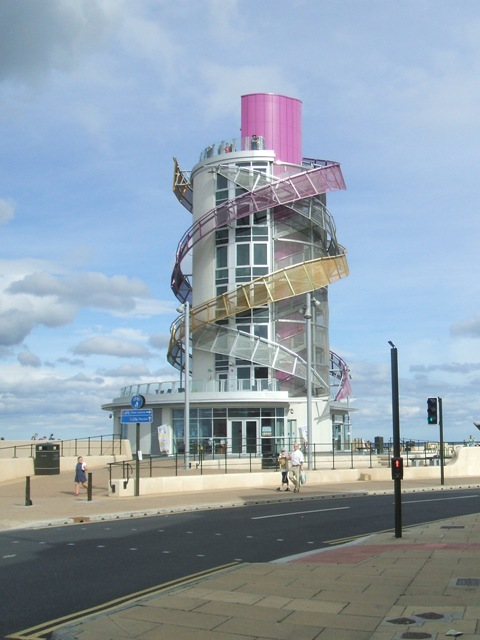
Redcar Beacon

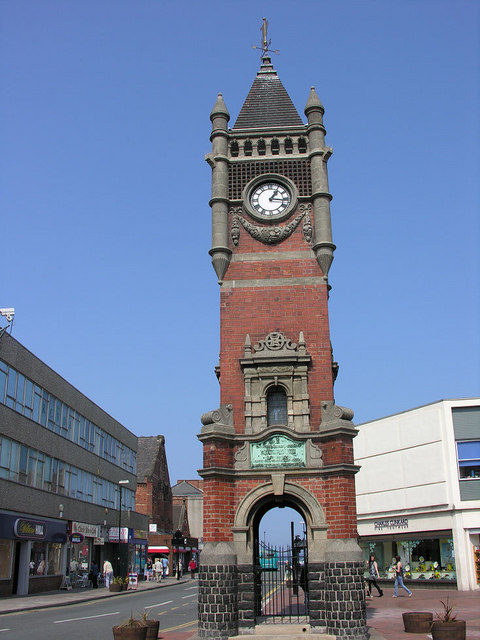
The town's clock tower

At the west end of High Street is a grade II listed clock tower, a memorial to King Edward VII.

Construction of the Redcar Beacon started in 2011. In 2013, when the building had been completed, it was nominated for the Building Design Carbuncle Cup for worst new building. It came third in the whole of the UK. In December 2015, the Beacon was damaged by winds from Storm Desmond, with several large pieces of panelling falling onto the beach below. It was also damaged in winter 2016, where a panel from the top fell off in a storm.

=== Buildings ===
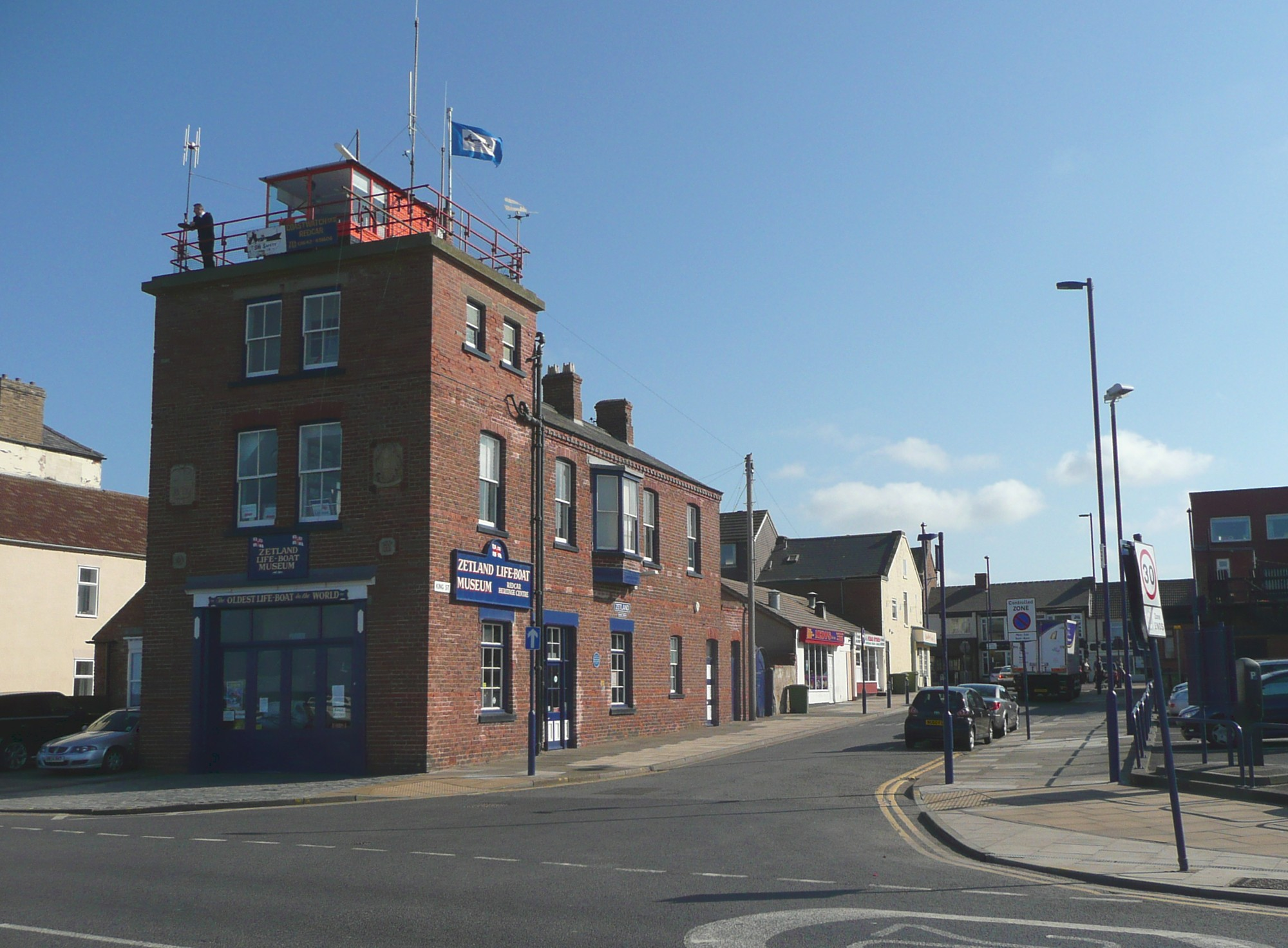
Zetland Lifeboat Museum, Esplanade

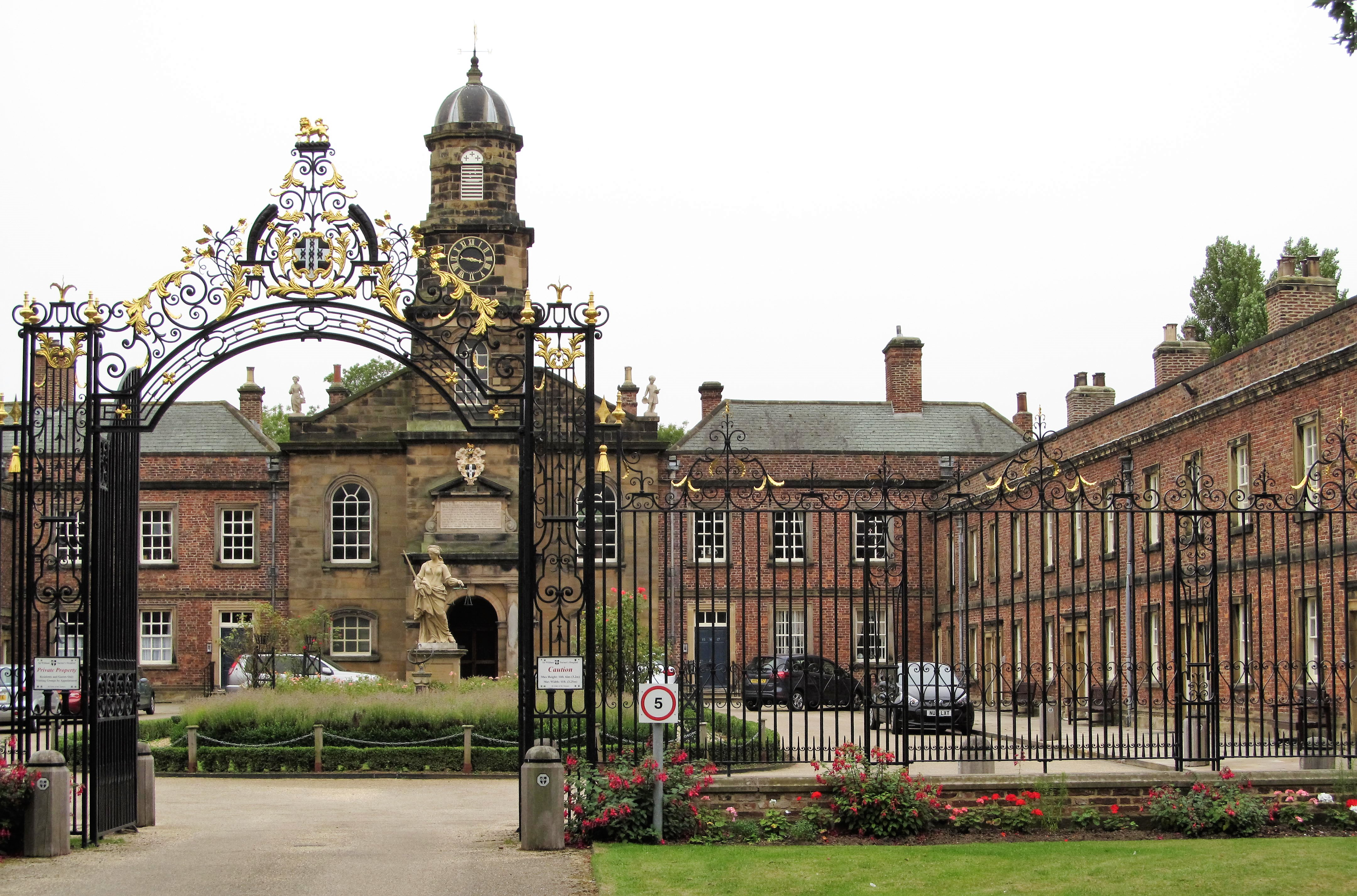
Turner's Hospital, Kirkleatham

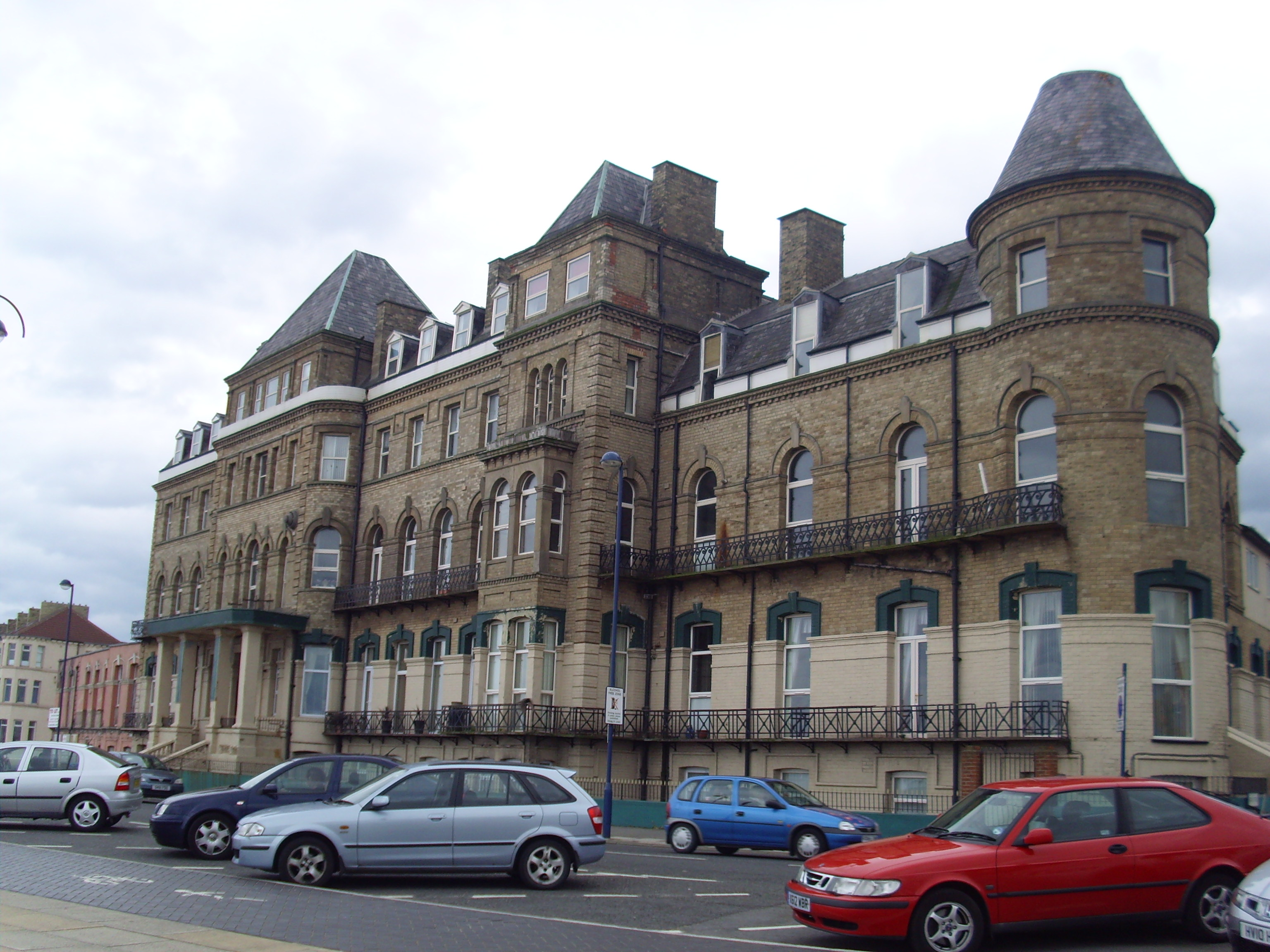
Former Coatham Hotel

There are 23 listed buildings in Redcar. The grade I Listed Sir William Turner's Hospital in Kirkleatham was built between 1674–1676 and listed on the 14 June 1952.

On the Esplanade is the grade II-Listed Zetland Lifeboat Museum housing the world's oldest lifeboat, Zetland.

The Victorian, former Coatham Hotel stands on Newcomen Terrace sea front. The ballroom of the hotel was home to the Redcar Jazz Club, a venue for bands of the late 1960s and early 1970s.

=== Structures and sculptures ===
In the south-east of Redcar is an aircraft listening post. This was built in 1916, during the First World War, as part of a regional defence system to give early warning of approaching aircraft, principally Zeppelins. It is an example of an acoustic mirror, similar to others found along the east coast of Britain. The mirror was used up until the invention of radar. It is now a grade II listed building.

== Religion ==
=== Catholic churches ===
In 1874, four furnaces were built at the nearby Warrenby ironworks, which attracted many Irish Catholic workers, and a school-chapel dedicated to the Sacred Heart was built to welcome Redcar's Catholics to Mass. This building later became a Methodist chapel. The present Sacred Heart Church was built in 1913-14, in "the fully-developed Gothic Revival" style. It opened in 1914.

The architect Frank Spinks was commissioned to build St Augustine's Church, serving the eastern part of the town, in 1937. These parishes were followed by St William's Church in Dormanstown and St Alban's Church, which was built amongst the newer housing estates of the 1960s and 70s.

With declining congregations, the number of parishes was reduced. In 2011, St Alban's closed, and in 2012, St William's also closed. The new parish of Blessed Nicholas Postgate was formed through the union of the parishes of the Sacred Heart and St Augustine in 2015. Five years later, in 2020, the nearby Saltburn parish of St Bede's Church, was also absorbed into the Parish of Blessed Nicholas Postgate.

=== Church of England ===
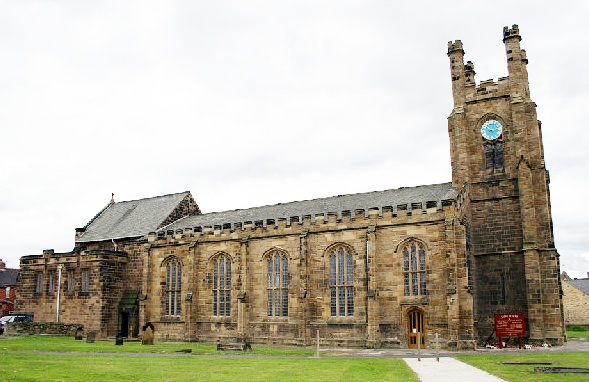
St Peter's Anglican Church

To the east of Redcar there is the Anglican Church of St Peter, designed by Ignatius Bonomi and built 1822–29 on land given by Lord Dundas. It is a grade II listed building. The foundation stone was laid by Lady Turner of Kirkleatham in 1823. Formerly, it was part of Marske Parish, but became an independent parish in 1867. It has a window commemorating local benefactor Sir William Turner.

== Transport ==
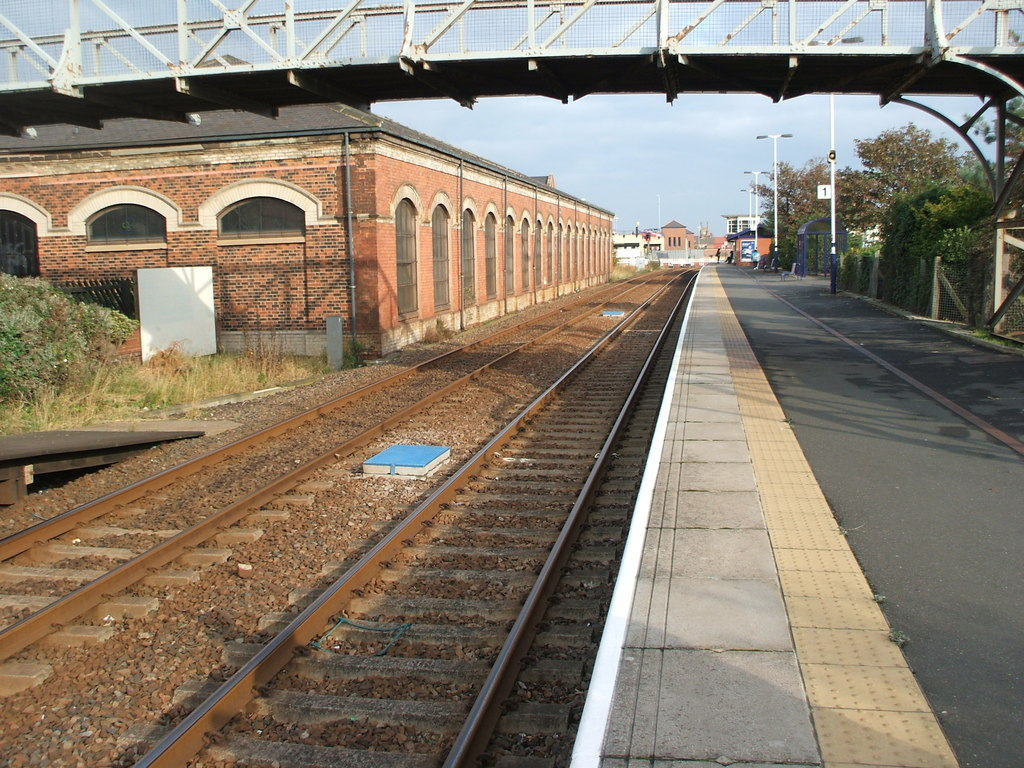
Redcar Central

Redcar has two railway stations, on the Tees Valley line, with trains operated by Northern and TransPennine Express, namely Redcar Central and Redcar East. A third station Redcar British Steel, which closed in December 2019, served the steelworks.

The main roads through the town are the A1085 and the A1042, with the A174 bypassing. Redcar is served primarily by Arriva North East buses, connecting Redcar with the surrounding towns and villages.

The Pangea North and CANTAT-3 submarine telecommunication cables both come ashore between Redcar and Marske-by-the-Sea.

== Education ==
The town's further education college is Redcar & Cleveland College.

The town's secondary schools are: Outwood Academy Redcar, Sacred Heart Catholic Secondary and Rye Hills Academy.

There are eleven primary schools in Redcar: Coatham, Dormanstown, Green Gates, Ings Farm, John E Batty, Lakes, Newcomen, Riverdale, St Benedict's, Wheatlands and Zetland.

== Media ==
Local news and television programmes are provided by BBC North East and Cumbria and ITV Tyne Tees, the local television station TalkTeesside also broadcasts to the area. Television signals are received from the Bilsdale TV transmitter.

Local radio stations are BBC Radio Tees, Heart North East, Capital North East, Smooth North East, Greatest Hits Radio Teesside, and Zetland FM, a community based radio station which broadcast from its studios on Newcomen Terrace in the town.

The town is served by the local newspapers, East Cleveland Herald & Post which is published by the TeessideLive. The Northern Echo also covers the area.

== Sport ==
In Coatham is Cleveland Golf Club, the first golf club to be formed in Yorkshire. It was established in 1887 and is a links course. Also in Coatham is Redcar Cricket Club, which play in the NYSD league, and Redcar Running Club.

In association football, Redcar Athletic currently compete in the Northern Premier League Premier Division while Redcar Town play in Northern League Division One. Redcar Rugby Union Football club play at Mackinlay Park.

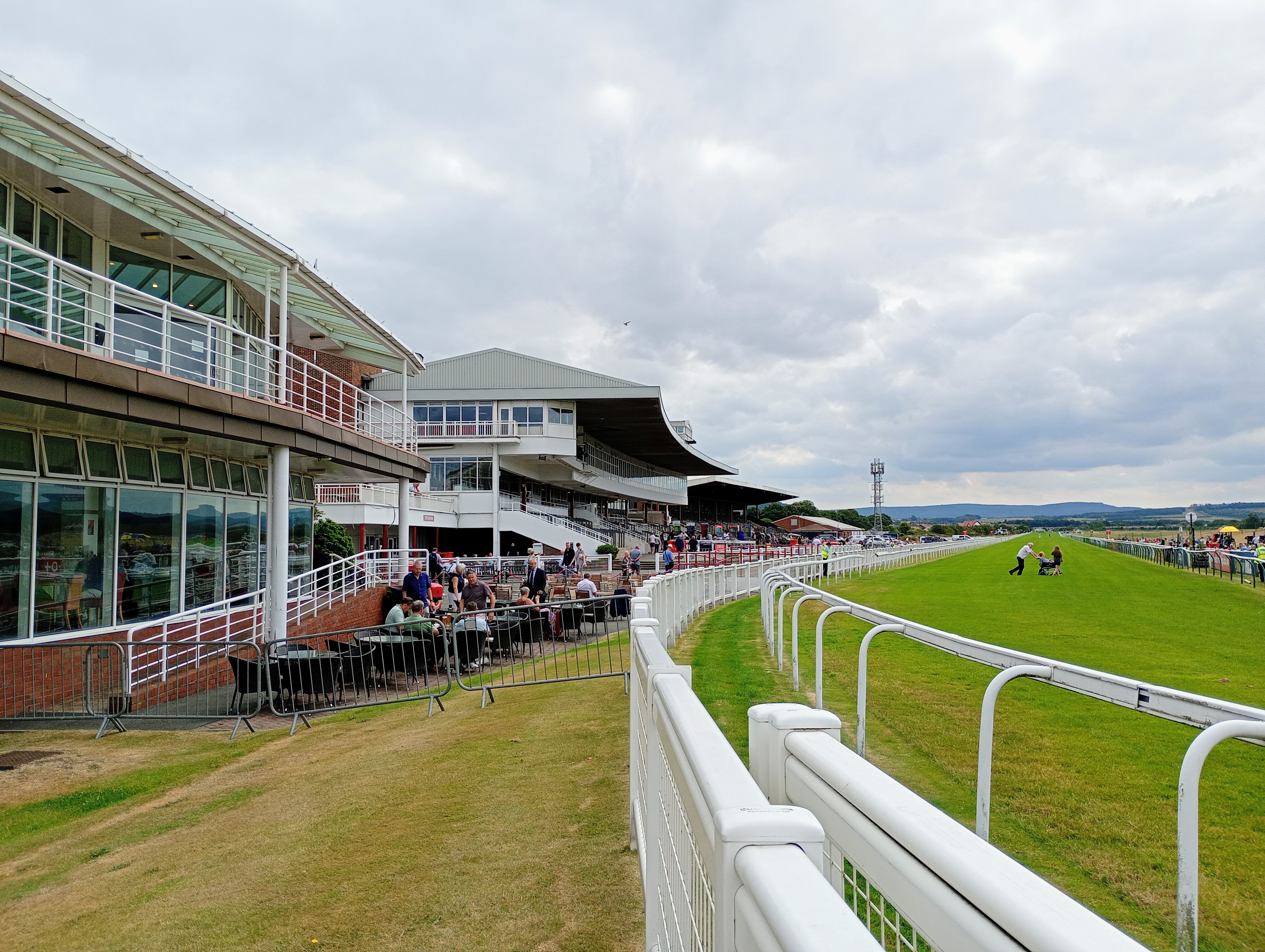
Redcar Racecourse

Redcar Racecourse is one of nine thoroughbred horse racecourses in Yorkshire. There is also a motorcycle speedway racing team, the Redcar Bears racing in the SGB Championship. The race track is at the South Tees Motorsport Park in Southbank Street, South Bank and is unusual in that one bend is more highly banked than the other..

The town hosted stage four of the 2022 Tour of Britain Men's, a UCI ProSeries cycling race. The town was previously set to host a stage of the Tour de Yorkshire, the event was affected by the COVID-19 pandemic.

== Notable people ==
- Gertrude Bell, colonial administrator and contemporary of Lawrence of Arabia spent her youthful years at Red Barns House in Coatham, which became, for a time, the Red Barns Hotel and a listed building.
- Roy Chubby Brown, Stand up comedian, lived in Redcar
- Dylan Cartlidge, singer and multi-instrumentalist, lived in Redcar
- David Coverdale, lead singer with Deep Purple and Whitesnake, worked in Redcar
- Pip Donaghy, actor, born in Redcar
- Mike Dunn, snooker player, lives Redcar
- Felicity Finch, actor, born Redcar
- Tanni Grey-Thompson, paralympian, lived in Redcar
- Hayden Hackney, footballer
- Danny Hart, mountain biker
- Rex Hunt, governor of the Falkland Islands during the 1982 invasion by Argentina, attended Coatham School.
- Jordan Jones, Rangers FC and Northern Ireland national football team midfielder was born in Redcar.
- June Laverick, actor
- Mo Mowlam represented Redcar parliamentary constituency in the House of Commons.
- Chris Norman, founder member and former lead singer of Smokie
- Anne Reid, actor
- Cole Robinson, international documentary filmmaker
- David Wheater, former footballer
- Pete York, drummer with the Spencer Davis Group and session drummer

== Film and television ==
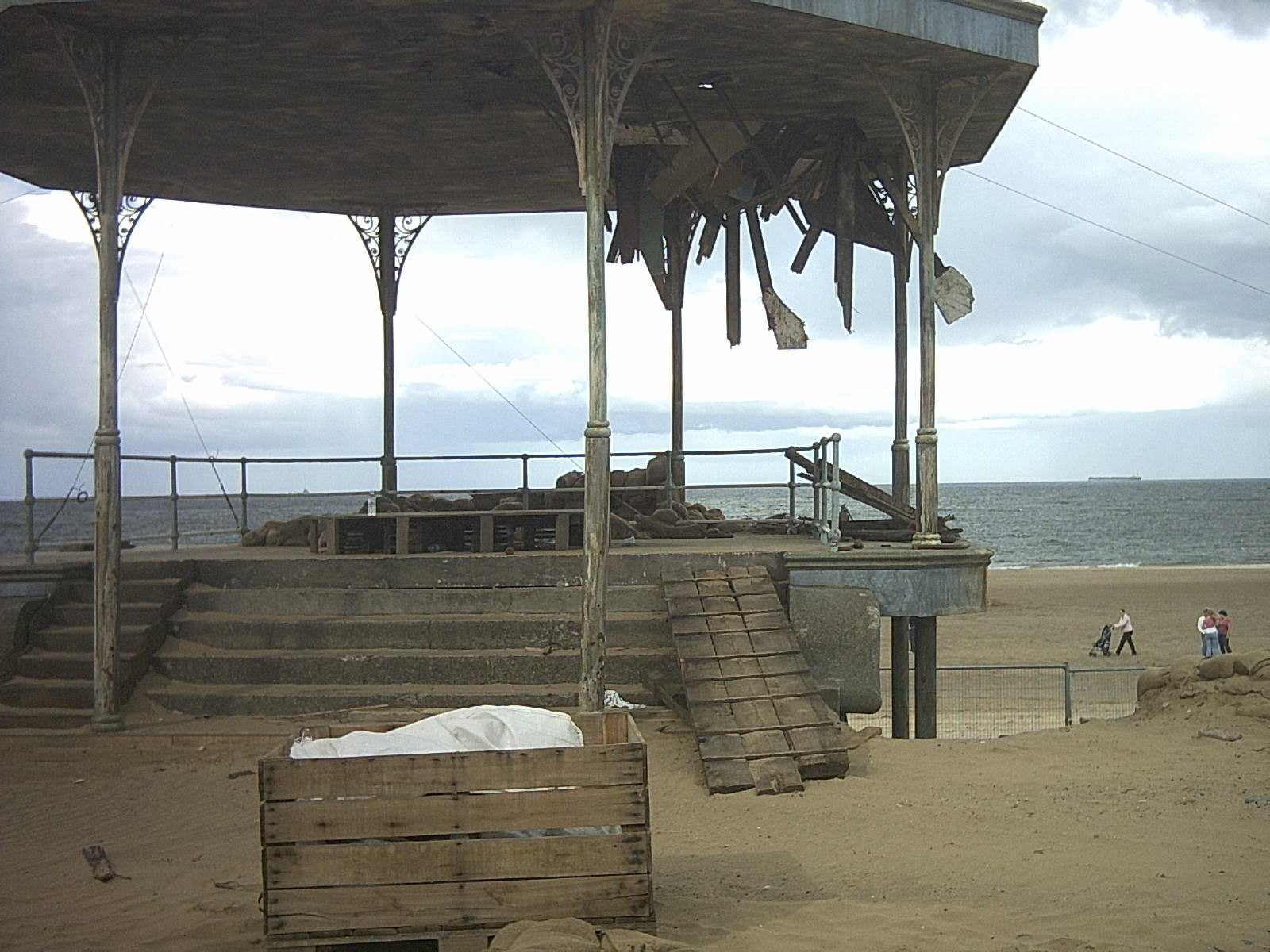
A location from the film Atonement

In 2006, Redcar was used as a location for the film adaptation of the Ian McEwan novel Atonement. The Coatham Hotel, Regent Cinema, a section of Newcomen Terrace and part of the beach were dressed as 1940s Dunkirk. Filming took place across three days in August 2006, with local men playing the soldiers.

In 2010, Redcar was featured on the Channel 4 television programme The Secret Millionaire. David Jamilly a humanitarian, philanthropist and self-made millionaire, visited the Redcar community and gave £25,000 to Zoë's Place for a sensory room, £25,000 to Redcar Amateur Boxing Club to start an Olympic fund, and £25,000 to Sid's Place for special counselling. The documentary featured the closure of the nearby Corus steelworks as well as the charities. In 2011, Jamilly opened a day care for adults with learning difficulties, the Redcar Primary Care Hospital and the new Sid's Place.

The town was filmed for the 2018 BBC television documentary The Mighty Redcar. The four-part series followed young people from Redcar and surrounding towns as they completed their studies and looked for work.

== See also ==
- Redcar Rocks, a Site of Special Scientific Interest in Redcar.
- South Gare & Coatham Sands SSSI, a Site of Special Scientific Interest north of Redcar.
