= Teesside Freeport =

Freeport in the United Kingdom

Teesside Freeport is the largest Freeport in the United Kingdom, where special arrangements apply for taxation and customs. It was launched in 2021.

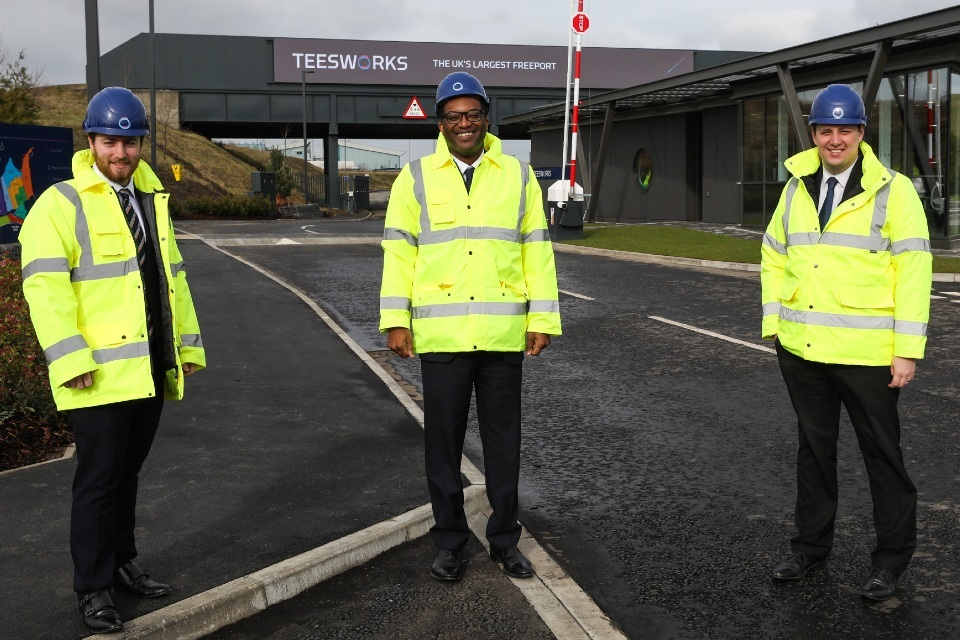
A ministerial visit by Kwasi Kwarteng to the Teesworks site in 2021

The freeport covers 4,500 acres across multiple sites including:

- Teesworks, a former steelworks described as Europe's largest brownfield site
- Wilton International (a former ICI site in Redcar and Cleveland)
- Teesside International Airport,
- the sea ports of Hartlepool and Teesport.

South Tees Development Corporation, which predates the freeport, has made substantial investments at the Teesworks site. With the announcement of the freeport, and the anticipated demand for land within it, the programme of demolition and remediation work was accelerated.

== Developments ==
In 2022 work began on a £400m factory for SeAh Wind to make offshore wind turbine bases on part of the Teesworks site acquired by Teesworks Ltd for £100. Other projects have been announced.

The Net Zero Teesside Power project broke ground in 2023. NZT Power is a gas-fired power station with carbon capture and storage, aiming to become part of a de-carbonised industrial cluster.

== Criticisms of the project ==
Politicians and the media have criticised Teesworks for possible pollution of the Tees in the context of an unexplained shellfish die-off near Teesside and for a perceived lack of transparency in the transfer of assets.

=== Pollution concerns ===
In October 2021 work started on the 1.2 km South Bank Quay project to provide a deep water facility. In the same month thousands of dead crabs and lobsters were washed up on the Tees estuary and beaches along the North-East coast of England. The deaths were first reported in Seaton Carew, Redcar and Seaham. Some people blamed dredging of the Tees, but this was not supported by government enquiries.

=== Corruption allegations, transparency concerns and inquiry ===
The corporate structure behind the freeport includes multiple subsidiary companies of which several have local business owners Chris Musgrave and Martin Corney as directors. MPs have alleged that significant assets have been transferred to these directors without a formal tendering process as is usual for public-sector development projects in the UK. Middlesbrough MP Andy McDonald, citing a Private Eye article in Parliament, said that the only economic growth being delivered at Teesworks "is into the accounts of Ben Houchen's pals, Messrs Musgrave and Corney". He alleged that for a £100 investment, the developers would "benefit to the tune of £100m".

==== Teesworks independent inquiry ====
The government announced an independent inquiry in May 2023. On the same day the freeport's director, Nolan Gray, announced that he was leaving; the Tees Valley Combined Authority (TVCA) said that the role which was created in 2021 was no longer necessary and that Gray would not be replaced. The inquiry reported in January 2024, finding no evidence of corruption, but criticised the lack of transparency.

Some people would have liked more involvement on the part of the National Audit Office.

== See also ==
- Freeports in the United Kingdom
