= 2024 Tees Valley mayoral election =

- 2 May 2024
- Turnout: 30.80%
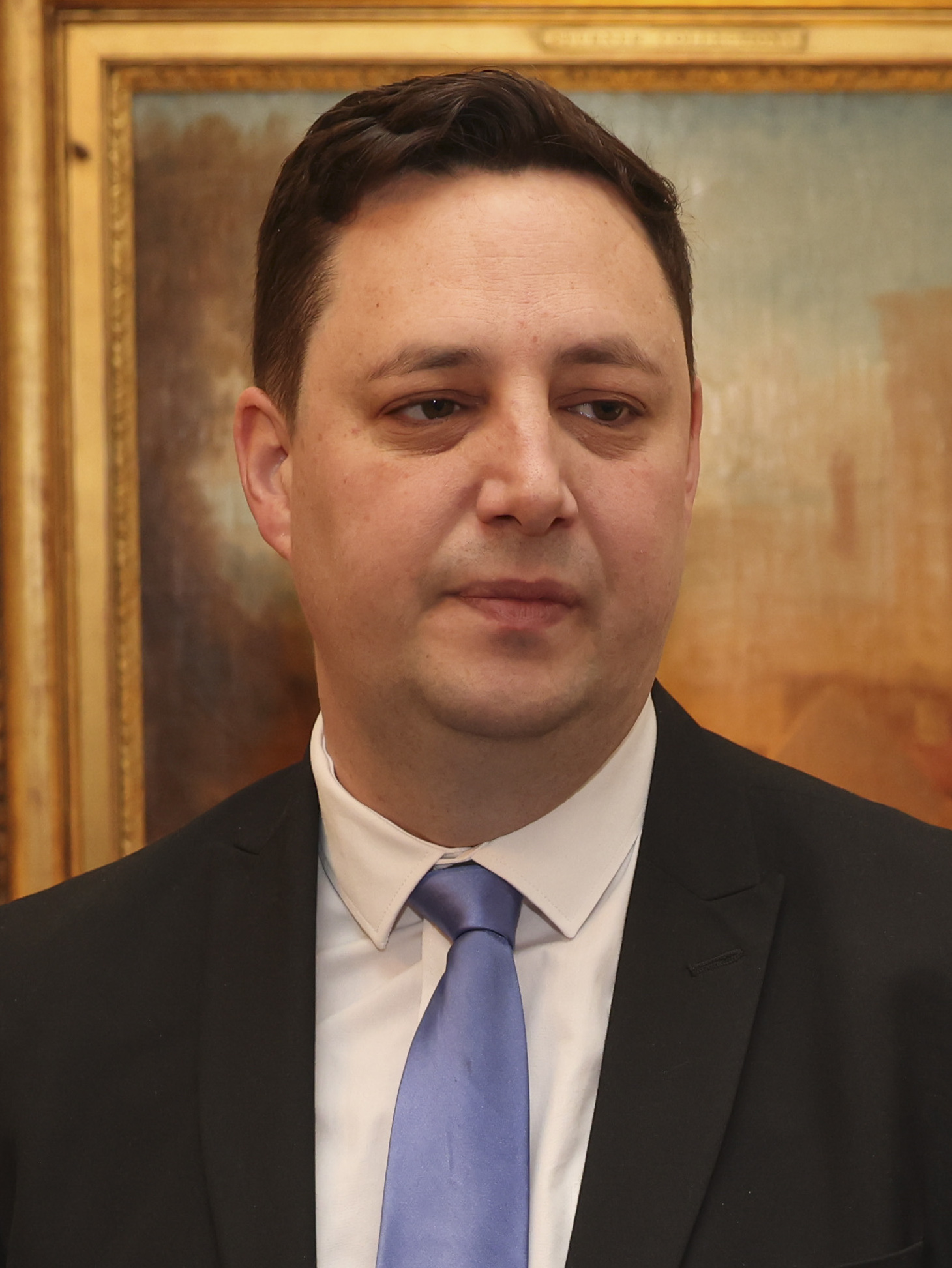
Candidate	Ben Houchen	Chris McEwan	Simon Thorley
Party	Conservative	Labour Co-op	Liberal Democrats
Popular vote	81,930	63,141	7,679
Percentage	53.6%	41.3%	5.0%
Swing	▼19.2 pp	▲14.1 pp	N/A
- Result by local authorities
Mayor before election
Ben Houchen
Conservative
Elected Mayor
Ben Houchen
Conservative

The 2024 Tees Valley mayoral election was held on 2 May 2024 to elect the mayor of the Tees Valley, part of the 2024 United Kingdom local elections. The Conservative incumbent mayor and member of the House of Lords, Ben Houchen, was re-elected with 53.6% of the vote.

== Background ==
The mayor serves as the directly elected leader of the Tees Valley Combined Authority and has powers considered lesser than those of other mayors such as Greater Manchester and the West of England. The mayor has power over an annual £15 million investment from the national government over a 30-year period, as well as control over adult skills training, social care and a consolidated transport budget- giving the ability to acquire bus services. The mayor does not supersede or overrule the five boroughs within the Tees Valley city-region.

The first election for the role in 2017 resulting in a victory for the Conservative candidate Ben Houchen, who was re-elected with an increased majority in the 2021 election. That election had originally been due to be held in 2020, but had been delayed due to the COVID-19 pandemic.

== Electoral system ==
Following the Elections Act 2022, the 2024 election took place using first-past-the-post voting. Prior elections had employed the supplementary vote system.

== Opinion polling ==
Dates conducted	Pollster	Client	Sample size	Con	Lab	Reform	Lib Dems	Green	Others	Lead
2 May 2024	2024 election		–	53.6%	41.3%	–	5.0%	–	–	12.3
12–29 Apr 2024	YouGov	N/A	924	51%	44%	–	5%	–	–	7
17–19 Apr 2024	Redfield and Wilton	N/A	1,000	47%	47%	–	6%	–	–	Tie
9–19 Feb 2024	Censuswide (Note: This poll was unweighted, and included 16–17 year olds.)	Yasper	1,000	23%	55%	9%	6%	6%	1%	32
6 May 2021	2021 election		–	72.8%	27.2%	–	–	–	–	45.6

== Candidates ==
=== Conservative ===
Ben Houchen, who had served as mayor since the inaugural election in 2017, was re-selected as the Conservative candidate in March 2023. Houchen said that if re-elected he would replace the University Hospital of North Tees with a new hospital, however the government later confirmed that the mayor does not have the powers to build a hospital.

=== Labour ===
Chris McEwan who previously worked for the NHS is the deputy leader of Darlington Borough Council. He was announced as Labour's candidate in November 2023. McEwan was selected by members over the trade union organiser Luke Henman.

McEwan who was raised in Middlesbrough said that his priorities would be transport and community, and also said he would bring more openness and transparency to the Tees Valley Combined Authority.

=== Liberal Democrats ===
Simon Thorley, a businessman from Darlington, general election candidate for Darlington, was selected to also stand for the Lib Dems for Tees Valley mayor.

=== Green Party ===
Sally Bunce was selected to stand as the Green Party candidate but withdrew at close of nominations for personal reasons, with insufficient time to nominate a different candidate. The local Green Parties have not endorsed any other candidates, despite unsubstantiated allegations made by local Conservative MP Simon Clarke of an electoral pact with Labour.

== Result ==
2024 Tees Valley Combined Authority Mayor
Party	Candidate	Votes	%	±%
Conservative	Ben Houchen	81,930	53.6	▼19.1
Labour Co-op	Chris McEwan	63,141	41.3	▲14.1
Liberal Democrats	Simon Thorley	7,679	5.0	▲5.0
Turnout		153,591	30.8	▼3.2

=== By local authority ===
==== Darlington ====
2024 Tees Valley Combined Authority Mayor
Party	Candidate	Votes	%	±%
Conservative	Ben Houchen	14,233	54.5	▼20.0
Labour Co-op	Chris McEwan	10,014	38.4	▲12.9
Liberal Democrats	Simon Thorley	1,849	7.1	▲7.1

==== Hartlepool ====
2024 Tees Valley Combined Authority Mayor
Party	Candidate	Votes	%	±%
Conservative	Ben Houchen	10,074	50.9	▼23.6
Labour Co-op	Chris McEwan	8,732	44.2	▲16.8
Liberal Democrats	Simon Thorley	972	4.9	▲4.9

==== Middlesbrough ====
2024 Tees Valley Combined Authority Mayor
Party	Candidate	Votes	%	±%
Conservative	Ben Houchen	13,285	48.4	▼20.2
Labour Co-op	Chris McEwan	12,749	46.5	▲15.1
Liberal Democrats	Simon Thorley	1,390	5.1	▲5.1

==== Redcar and Cleveland ====
2024 Tees Valley Combined Authority Mayor
Party	Candidate	Votes	%	±%
Conservative	Ben Houchen	15,987	53.9	▼21.1
Labour Co-op	Chris McEwan	12,015	40.5	▲15.5
Liberal Democrats	Simon Thorley	1,639	5.5	▲5.5

==== Stockton-on-Tees ====
2024 Tees Valley Combined Authority Mayor
Party	Candidate	Votes	%	±%
Conservative	Ben Houchen	28,351	56.9	▼15.8
Labour Co-op	Chris McEwan	19,631	39.4	▲12.1
Liberal Democrats	Simon Thorley	1,829	3.7	▲3.7
