= South Tees Development Corporation =

Regeneration body in England

- Formation: 1 August 2017
- Type: Mayoral development corporation
- Headquarters: Teesside Management Offices, Redcar TS10 5QW; United Kingdom
- Coordinates: 54.6113°N 1.1152°W
- Chair: Ben Houchen
- Chief executive: David Allison
- Website: www.southteesdc.com

The South Tees Development Corporation (STDC) is the first mayoral development corporation outside of Greater London, established under the Cities and Local Government Devolution Act 2016. It was created to "promote the economic growth and commercial development of Tees Valley by converting assets in the South Tees area into opportunities for business investment and economic growth".

The jurisdiction comprises approximately 1,800 hectares of land to the south of the River Tees in the Borough of Redcar and Cleveland. The land includes former Teesside Steelworks and other industrial sites and is close to Teesport.

== Board members ==
There are 16 members; the Tees Valley Mayor, Leader of Redcar and Cleveland Borough Council, and the Mayor of Middlesbrough have statutory posts on the board.

== Activities ==
The corporation made a Compulsory purchase order for land at the former Redcar Steel Works in April 2019. The £11.5m valuation of the site was contested by the owners Sahaviriya Steel Industries.

== See also ==
- Teesside Development Corporation
- Tees Valley Regeneration
