= Freeports in the United Kingdom =

Freeports in the United Kingdom are a series of government assigned special economic zones where customs rules such as taxes do not apply until goods leave the specified zone. The theoretical purpose of such freeports is to encourage economic activity in the surrounding area and increase manufacturing. Critics of such schemes, including the parliamentary opposition, see them as possible tax havens and open to money laundering.

Goods imported into freeports do not incur usual import procedures on entry and re-exit. Import duties are not payable until the goods are put into free circulation or used within the free zone.

The first freeport in the United Kingdom opened in the 1980s under Margaret Thatcher, as an attempt to combat de-industrialisation and a declining economy. Several freeports operated throughout the United Kingdom, but by 2012 the Conservative-led government decided not to renew their licences.

During the 2021 United Kingdom budget, Chancellor of the Exchequer, Rishi Sunak announced the first eight new freeports would be created.

== History ==
In their 1983 manifesto, The Challenge of Our Times, the Conservative government outlined its plans to establish 'experimental' freeports as a part of its regional policies to modernise the British economy following the early 1980s recession. After winning a second term at the general election Margaret Thatcher's government assigned freeport status to six areas; namely Belfast, Birmingham, Cardiff, Liverpool, Glasgow Prestwick Airport and Southampton. These freeports experienced limited success during their lifetime and by 2012 Prime Minister David Cameron decided not to renew the freeport licences. Teesside MP Simon Clarke blamed the failed experiment on "an uncharacteristic lack of ambition by the Thatcher Government" and "the regulatory constraints placed on them by the EU".

== 21st century ==
In 2016, the then backbench MP—and later Chancellor of the Exchequer—Rishi Sunak published a white paper for the Centre for Policy Studies outlining his ideas for post-Brexit freeports similar to those in the United States. The paper titled The Free Ports Opportunity suggested that creation of such ports could create 86,000 jobs and help fuel the Northern Powerhouse by bringing increased trade to deprived areas. After the Conservative Party's victory in the 2019 general election, plans were announced for ten freeports to be set up by 2021 with regions bidding for free status. Up to 40 bids for freeport status were received during the process.

As part of the 2021 United Kingdom budget, Chancellor of the Exchequer Rishi Sunak announced that eight new freeports would be created in England. They are East Midlands Airport, Felixstowe and Harwich, Humber region, Liverpool City Region, Plymouth, Solent, Thames and Teesside.

The UK government named three aims behind creating freeports, promoting regeneration and job creation, creating a hub for global trade and to create a hotbed for innovation.

Other devolved governments within the United Kingdom were invited to establish freeports, one or two each. The Scottish government announced plans for so called sustainable "green ports", the Welsh government said it would continue, providing it received the same level of funding as England and the Northern Ireland Executive said it was working with the HM Treasury to implement its own site.

In October 2024, the Keir Starmer Labour government announced official clearance for five existing freeports to have customs sites, which is needed to class them as operational.

== List of UK Freeports ==
Location	Port(s) and customs sites	Country	Operational	Note	Website
Anglesey Freeport (Welsh: Porthladd Rhydd Ynys Môn)	Holyhead, Anglesey Prosperity Zone, Rhosgoch, M-Sparc	Wales	pending		
Celtic Freeport (Welsh: Porthladd Rhydd Celtaidd)	Milford Haven and Port Talbot	Wales	pending		
East Midlands Freeport	East Midlands Airport	England	April 2023		
Forth Green Freeport	Grangemouth, Rosyth and Leith ports, Edinburgh Airport, Burntisland	Scotland	pending		
Freeport East	Port of Felixstowe, Harwich International Port	England	January 2023		
Humber Freeport	Port of Immingham, Port of Hull, Port of Grimsby, Goole	England	pending		
Inverness and Cromarty Firth Green Freeport	Inverness, Cromarty Firth, Nigg and Inverness Airport.	Scotland	pending		
Liverpool City Region Freeport	Liverpool Waters, Wirral Waters	England	January 2023		
Plymouth and South Devon Freeport	Devonport	England	December 2022		
Solent Freeport	Port of Southampton, Southampton Airport, Portsmouth International Port	England	December 2022		
Teesside Freeport	Teesport, Hartlepool, Teesside Airport	England	December 2022		
Thames Freeport	London Gateway, Port of Tilbury, Ford Dagenham	England	March 2023		11]

== Rules regarding freeports ==
- Maximum of 45 km in diameter.
- Freeports receive up to £25 million initial seed funding.
- Each Freeport has a number of sites, which may have different tax rules and are limited to 6 km^{2} per Freeport.
- Each Freeport will contain between one and three tax and customs locations.
- Temporary tax incentives to encourage investment
  - Stamp Duty Land Tax relief in England until March 2026.
  - Enhanced capital allowances until 30 September 2026.
  - Employment tax incentives and National Insurance Contributions reliefs on low paid employees, until April 2026.
  - Business rates relief for 5 years.
- Allow certain specific developments without requiring planning permission, the same permitted development rights as those available to airports.
- Simplified import and export procedures.
- Deferrals and exemptions from duty payments
- VAT suspension within customs site

== Criticism ==
Proposal for freeports in the United Kingdom have been heavily criticised by opposition parties, trade unions, think tanks and various economists. Reasons for this include the possibility for use as tax havens, smuggling and a way to erode worker's rights.

Despite claims of a cross party consensus, Labour Party members showed opposition to the idea with a speaker at a Labour conference describing them as "job-destroying". Further to this, Labour party leader Keir Starmer called it "giving up" and "blind faith". Former Shadow Chancellor of the Exchequer John McDonnell suggested it to be '"a revival of a failed Thatcherite plan from the 1980s, designed to cut away at regulation and our tax base."

At a Liberal Democrat conference in 2019, members passed a motion for the abolition of freeports due to the increased risk of money-laundering and tax evasion. Similarly the then Home Affairs spokesperson—and later leader— Sir Ed Davey suggested the UK could become the world capital of money laundering.

In Scotland, the Scottish National Party (SNP) was sceptical, with trade minister Ivan McKee calling them a "shiny squirrel" to distract from the consequences of Brexit. adding "the reputation of freeports across the world is mixed, with concerns about deregulation and risks of criminality, tax evasion and reductions in workers’ rights". First Minister Nicola Sturgeon also raised concern over them being "low-cost, low-wage, low-value opportunities". Despite these remarks, in 2021 the SNP announced its own version of freeports, called 'green ports', which they say will adopt "best practice which helps deliver our net-zero emissions and fair work principles, alongside supporting regeneration and innovation ambitions".

== Freeport developments ==
=== East Midlands Freeport ===
An inland Freeport, comprising 533 hectares at three sites, East Midlands Airport, East Midlands Intermodal Park and the Ratcliffe-on-Soar Power Station redevelopment site. Given £25m of initial capital to develop transport infrastructure and a Hydrogen Skills Academy. The airport is investing £120m in a 5-year modernisation programme.

=== Freeport East ===
Funding of £25m was provided in 2023 to start the process of generating 13,500 new jobs at two sites at the Port of Felixstowe and Harwich International Port and four customs sites including Bathside Bay. 50% of business rates that would have gone to central government can be used by the local authority for training and local developments.

=== Liverpool City Region Freeport ===
One of the customs sites, in Sefton will hold Atlantic Park a highly specified industrial and logistics development, built on a former Rolls Royce factory site. Another named Arc Royal, located next to the ship builder Cammell Laird, will be a carbon neutral distribution/production building.

=== Plymouth and South Devon Freeport ===
Three sites were acquired in late 2023 for £7.8m at Beaumont Way in Langage, Sherford and Millbay Docks using the £20m provided by the Department for Levelling Up, Housing and Communities. The target is to generate 3,500 jobs, mainly in the defence and maritime industries.

=== Solent Freeport ===
Eight locations for the Solent Freeport, the Navigator quarter next to Southampton Airport and Eastleigh rail depot, Portsmouth has the port and Dunsbury Park, with five zones in Southampton at Fawley, the Exxonmobil oil terminal, two sites on the New Forest side of the water and a 30-acre site at Redbridge. Portico Shipping providing a new HMRC customs facility at Portsmouth.

=== Teesside Freeport ===
Comprising 4,500 acres it is the largest Freeport in the UK, with sites at Teesworks, Teesside International Airport, PD Teesport, Wilton International, Port of Middlesbrough, the Port of Hartlepool, Able Seaton Port, Redcar Bulk Terminal and LV Shipping. Plans have been submitted for British Steel to open a new steel production plant, with an electric arc furnace, inside the Teesworks Freeport area.

=== Thames Freeport ===
Thames Freeport comprises 1,700 acres of land over three sites, the Port of Tilbury, Ford’s Dagenham plant and the London Gateway. Thames Freeport at Tilbury 2 has had a new daily ferry link to Rotterdam (Europoort) since March 2024.

== See also ==
- List of free economic zones
- Special economic zone
