= St Peter's Church, Redcar =

Anglican church in Redcar, North Yorkshire, England

St Peter's Anglican Church, Redcar
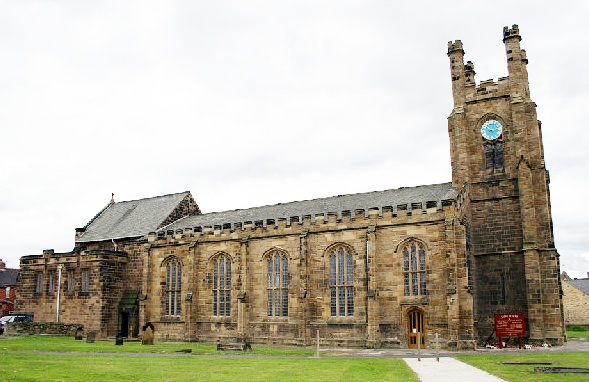
- St Peter's Anglican Church, Redcar
- 54.6163°N 1.0595°W
- OS grid reference: NZ 60852 24978
- Location: Redcar, Redcar and Cleveland, North Yorkshire.
- Country: England
- Denomination: Anglican
- Website: www.stpeterschurchredcar.co.uk

History
- Status: Parish church

Architecture
- Functional status: Active
- Heritage designation: Grade II
- Architect: Ignatius Bonomi
- Architectural type: Church of England
- Style: Gothic Revival

Administration
- Province: York
- Diocese: York
- Archdeaconry: Cleveland
- Parish: Redcar

St Peter's Church is an Anglican parish church in Redcar, Redcar and Cleveland, North Yorkshire, England. It was designed in 1829 by Ignatius Bonomi from Durham and is dedicated to St. Peter. It is near the seafront and coastline of the North Sea and Yorkshire Coast. It is an active place of worship in the Diocese of York.
