= Ben Houchen =

British politician (born 1986)

The Right Honourable The Lord Houchen of High Leven
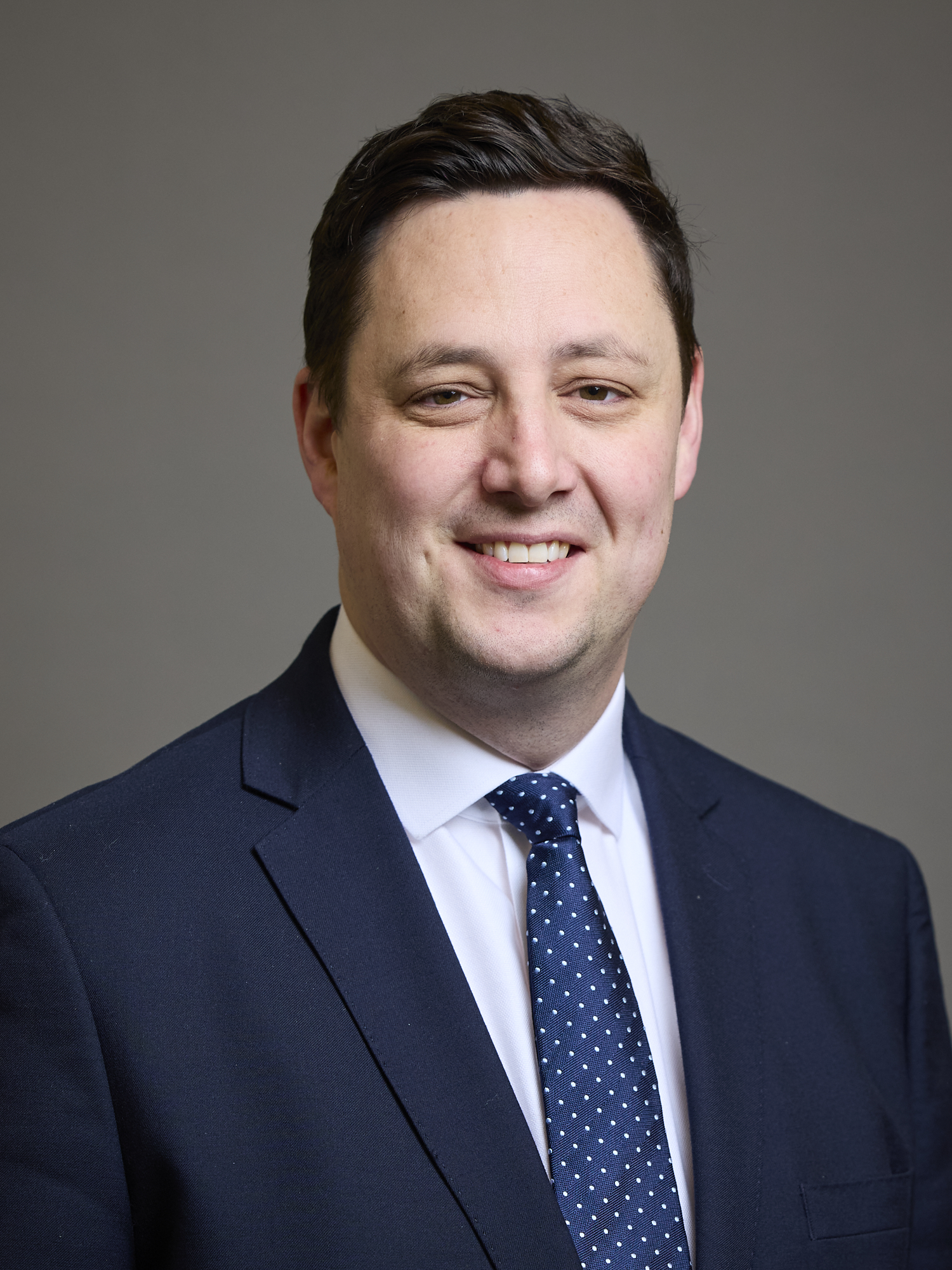
- Official portrait, 2024

Tees Valley Mayor
- Incumbent
- Assumed office 8 May 2017
- Preceded by: Office established

Member of the House of Lords
- Lord Temporal
- Life peerage 12 July 2023

Personal details
- Born: 9 December 1986 (age 39) Stockton-on-Tees, England
- Party: Conservative
- Spouse: Rachel Flanagan (m. 2011)
- Education: Northumbria University
- Website: Official website

Ben Houchen, Baron Houchen of High Leven (born 9 December 1986) is a British Conservative politician and life peer. He has been strategic authority mayor for Tees Valley Mayor since 2017, winning the inaugural mayoral election in the combined authority. Houchen was re-elected in 2021 and won a third term in 2024.

As mayor, Houchen represents the five local authority areas in the Tees Valley: Middlesbrough, Stockton-on-Tees, Redcar and Cleveland, Hartlepool, and Darlington, and he also acts as chairman of the Tees Valley Combined Authority, the body tasked with driving economic growth and job creation in the area.

After the May 2024 local elections, Houchen was the Conservative Party's only combined authority mayor in England, until Paul Bristow won the Cambridgeshire and Peterborough mayoral election in May 2025.

== Early life ==
Born at Stockton-on-Tees, Houchen grew up in Ingleby Barwick and attended Conyers' School in Yarm before going to study law at Northumbria University. He is the nephew of Keith Houchen, a former football player for Coventry City F.C.

== Political career ==
Houchen served as a Councillor on Stockton-on-Tees Borough Council, representing Yarm Ward, between 2011 and 2017. In 2012 he stood as the Conservative parliamentary candidate in the Middlesbrough by-election, finishing fourth of eight candidates with 1,063 votes (6.3%), only three votes ahead of the Peace Party. In the 2014 European Parliament elections, Houchen was the Conservative candidate for the North East region.

Houchen was selected as the Conservative Party candidate for Tees Valley Mayor in December 2016. Houchen would go on to win the 2017 Tees Valley mayoral election. Upon taking office, he became styled as Mayor.

In 2019, he appeared on LBC's list of the "Top 100 Most Influential Conservatives", at number 100. He was accused of pork barrel politics in the run-up to the Hartlepool by-election of 2021.

At the 2021 Tees Valley mayoral election, Houchen was re-elected with 72.8% of the vote.

Nominated as a Life Peer in Boris Johnson's resignation honours of June 2023, on 12 July 2023, he was created Baron Houchen of High Leven, of Ingleby Barwick in the Borough of Stockton-on-Tees. Introduced to the House of Lords on 24 July, where he sits on the Conservative benches, Lord Houchen of High Leven made his maiden speech on 8 November 2023.

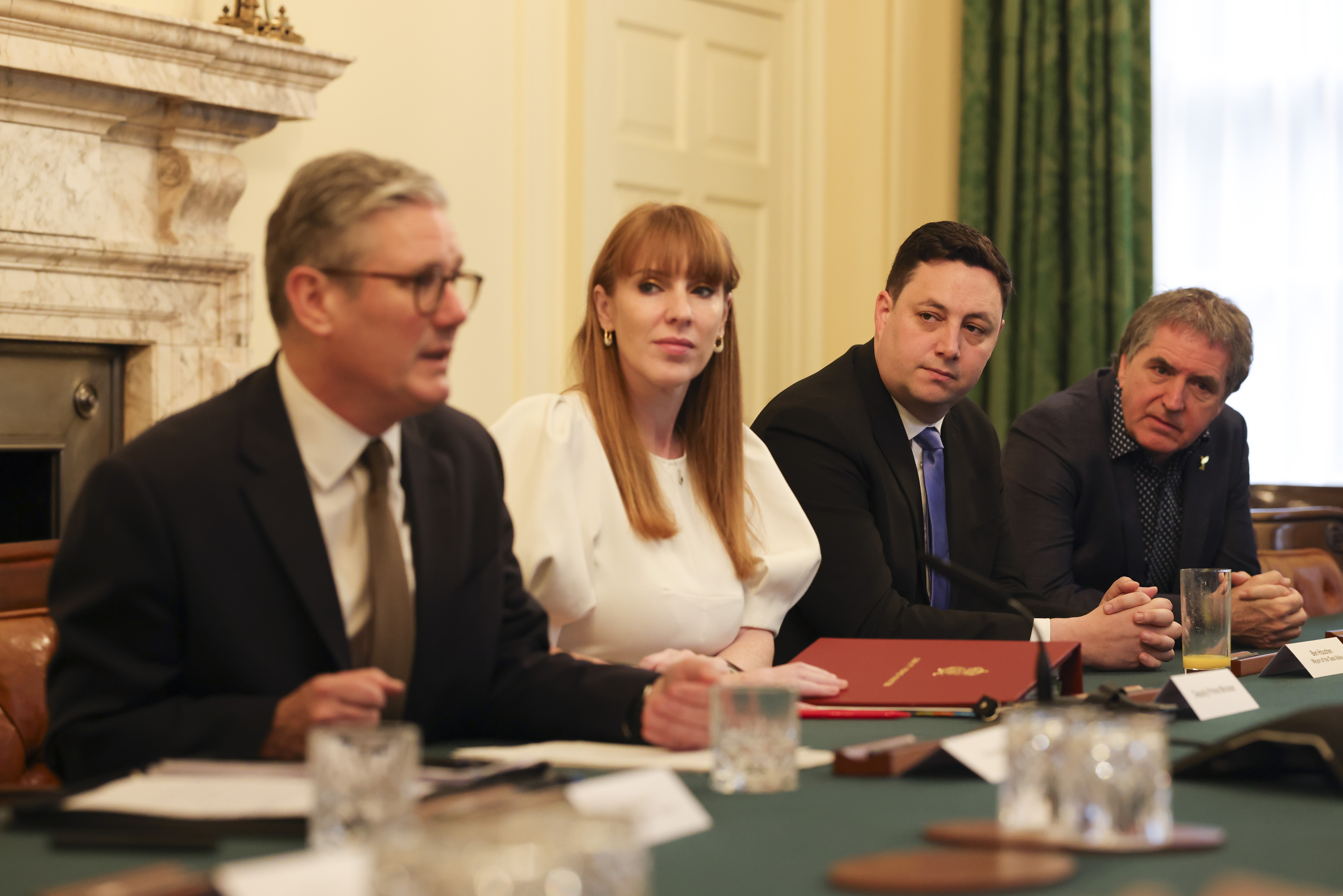
Houchen with Keir Starmer, Angela Rayner and Steve Rotheram in 2024 whilst visiting Downing Street

Houchen was reelected for a third time in May 2024 on a reduced majority. Following his reelection, Houchen criticised prime minister Rishi Sunak, blaming him for infighting and chaos within the Conservative Party.

=== Teesside Airport ===
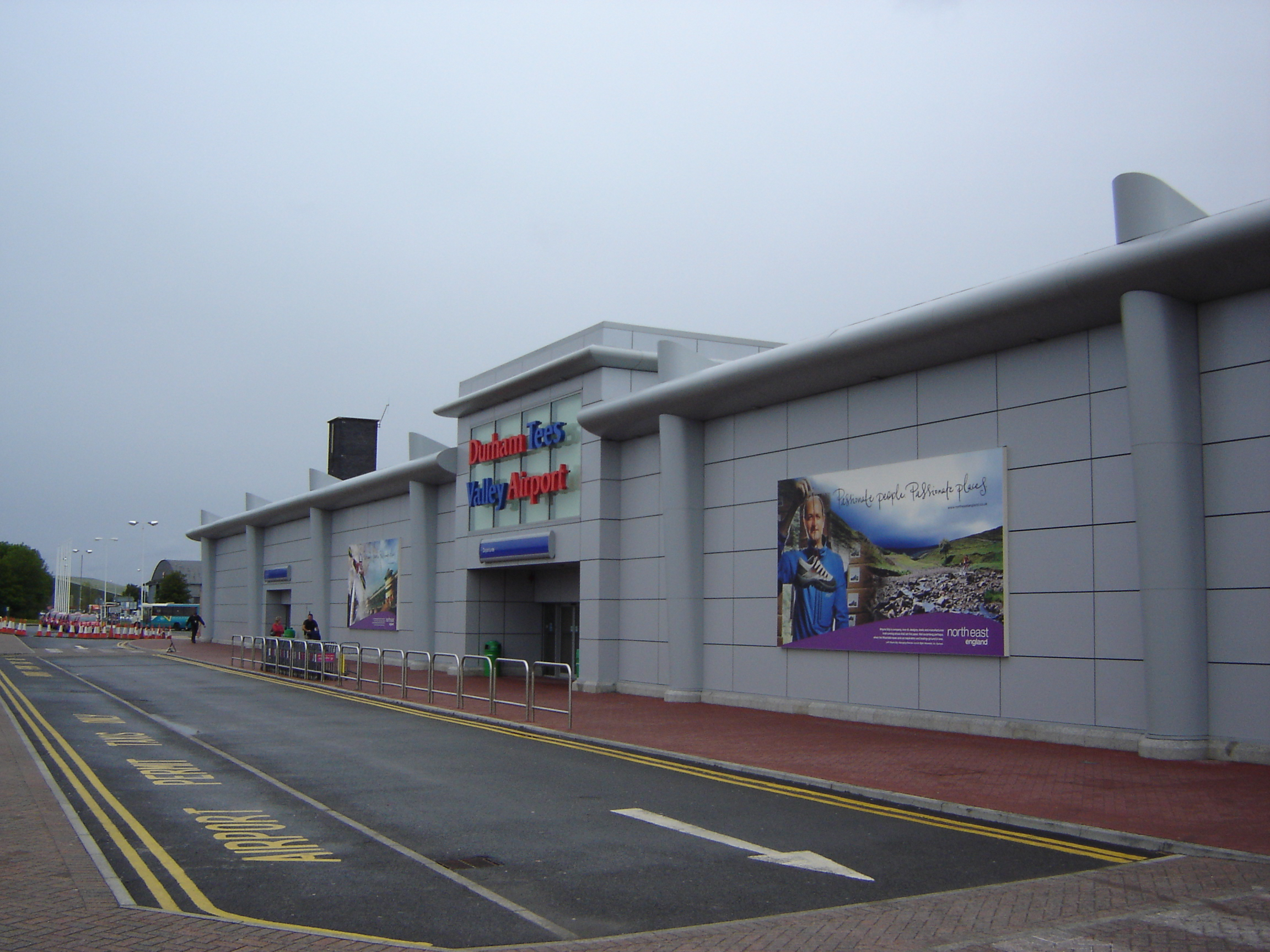
Teesside Airport, seen prior to the combined authority's purchase

As part of his 2017 mayoral campaign, Houchen promised to bring Teesside International Airport (then Durham Tees Valley Airport) back into its previous name and public ownership. In December 2018 Houchen announced that a £40 million deal to buy the airport had been reached with The Peel Group. The acquisition was unanimously approved by the Tees Valley Combined Authority Cabinet in January 2019.

Losses at the airport grew to £30.3 million from the 2019 to 2022 financial years, leading to Houchen ploughing a further £30 million of public money into the airport.

=== South Tees Development Corporation ===
The South Tees Development Corporation (STDC) is the first Mayoral Development Corporation outside of London. Chaired by Houchen, the STDC area covers approximately 4,500 acres of land to the south of the River Tees, in the Borough of Redcar and Cleveland, and includes the former SSI steelworks site as well as other industrial assets. The area includes the deep-water port of Teesport. The STDC aims to create approximately 20,000 new jobs and contribute £1 billion per annum to the UK economy by 2025. However, as of late 2021, the economic impact of the port has been described as 'speculative' by a member of the management board.

In January 2019, Houchen announced that a deal had been reached to acquire 1,420 acres of land on the STDC site from Tata Steel Europe. The acquisition was signed off in February 2019.

Consequently, he was one of the figures responsible in 2021 for the controversial demolition of the landmark Dorman Long Tower despite the granting of a Grade II listing to the Brutalist building. He later accused the Historic England official who listed the structure of being a junior member of staff, who had acted without the permission of senior managers. This was later robustly denied by Historic England, who released a statement saying "The mayor’s statement is incorrect – the listing was not a mistake. Historic England advised DCMS to list the site. Following a site visit, our advice to list the site remained the same".

In November 2023, Houchen proposed the STDC area as a potential location for a Las Vegas-style Sphere venue, after London Mayor Sadiq Khan blocked proposals for the MSG Sphere London on the grounds of light pollution.

== 2024 Conservative Party leadership election ==
On 9 July 2024, Houchen said in an interview on Times Radio (when asked whether Suella Braverman was a suitable choice to be Leader of the Conservative party): "I don’t think it’s a credible offering and the MPs and the members that I speak to are not interested in the divisive rightwing politics of Suella Braverman. If the Conservative party decides to go down the route of somebody like Suella Braverman, then we can absolutely see ourselves in opposition for generations to come."

== Controversies ==
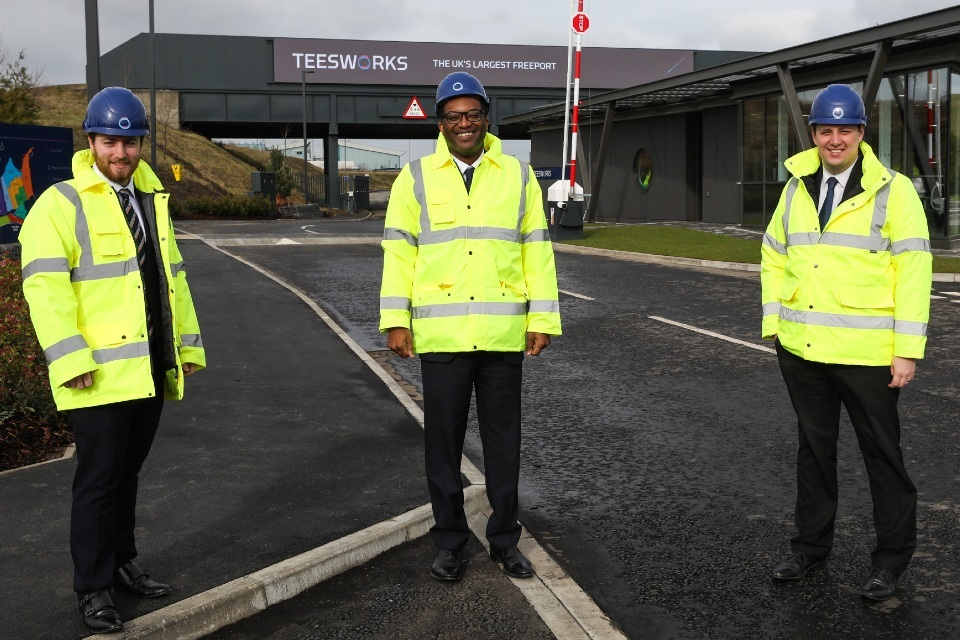
Houchen (right), with Business and Energy Secretary Kwasi Kwarteng (centre), at one of the entrances to the "Teesworks" site, in March 2021

In 2023, Houchen was criticised after it emerged that a 90 per cent stake in the company that operates the vacant Redcar Steelworks site, teesworks, was transferred to two local developers, Chris Musgrave and Martin Corney, without any public tender process. It also emerged that the private developers have received at least £45 million in dividends and hold £63 million cash from the project despite not having invested any direct cash in the project themselves.

A subsequent investigation found that the Tees Valley Combined Authority and South Tees Development Corporation did not meet standards expected when managing public funds, and raised questions about transparency and oversight across the system to evidence value for money.

Between his introduction to the House of Lords in July 2023 and July 2026, Houchen claimed more than £25,000 in attendance allowance for 73 days on which he had no recorded parliamentary activity such as voting or speaking. In 2025–26 he claimed the allowance for 21 days on which his travel to London and accommodation were also paid for by the Tees Valley Combined Authority, which he chairs.

== Personal life ==
Houchen married Rachel Flanagan, a former deputy head teacher at Conyers' School, in 2011. Houchen lives in Yarm in Cleveland.

Orders of precedence in the United Kingdom
Preceded by The Lord Ranger of Northwood	Gentlemen; Baron Houchen of High Leven	Followed by The Lord Rosenfield
