= 2021 Tees Valley mayoral election =

Local election in England

- 6 May 2021
- Turnout: 34%
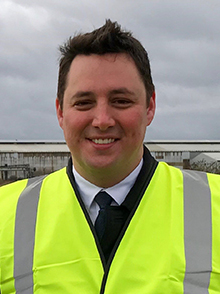

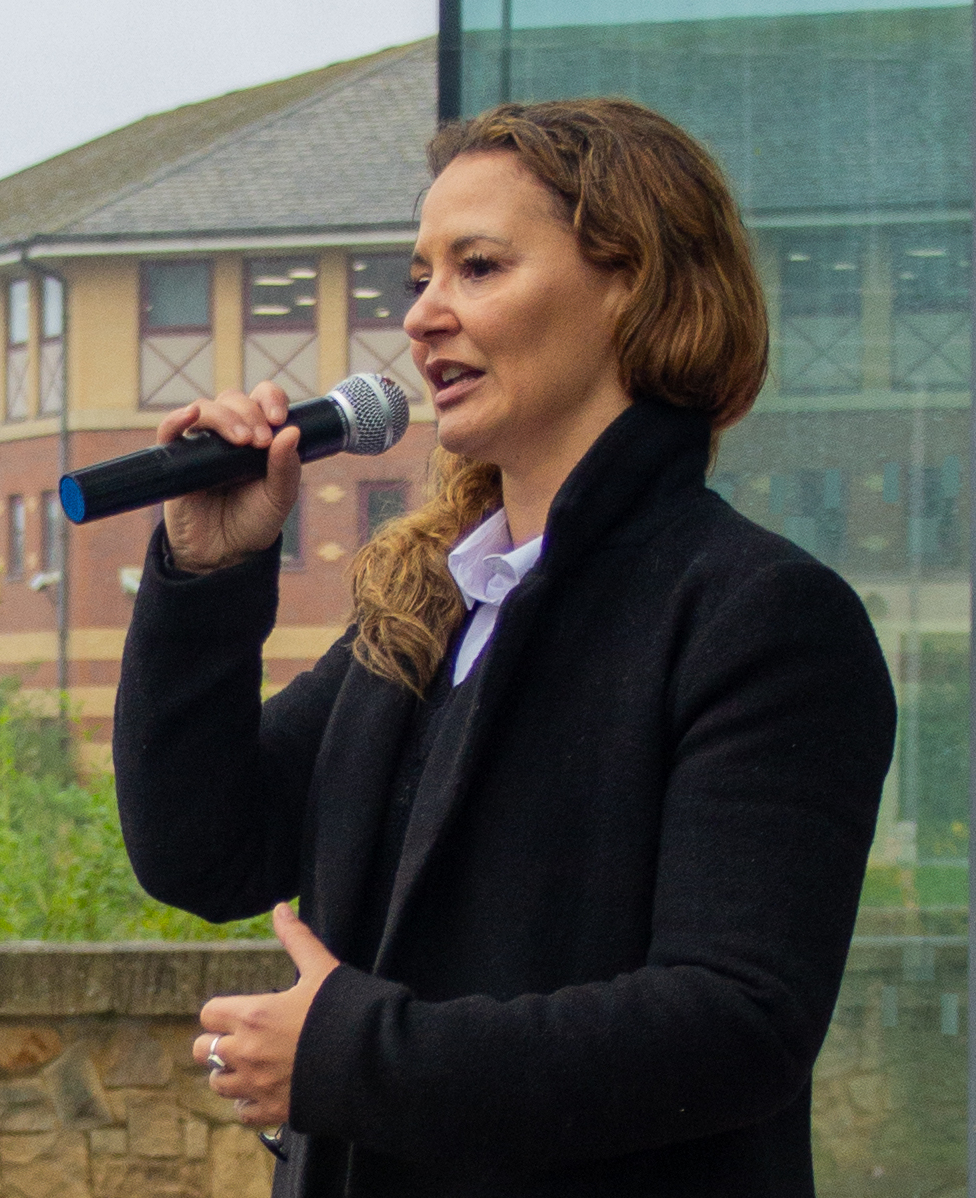
Candidate	Ben Houchen	Jessie Joe Jacobs
Party	Conservative	Labour Co-op
Popular vote	121,964	45,641
Percentage	72.8%	27.2%
Swing	▲33.3pp	▼11.7pp
- Result by local authorities
Mayor before election
Ben Houchen
Conservative
Elected Mayor
Ben Houchen
Conservative

The 2021 Tees Valley mayoral election was held on 6 May 2021 to elect the Tees Valley Mayor on the same day as other local elections across the country. The mayor was elected by the supplementary vote. The election was originally due to take place in May 2020, but was postponed due to the COVID-19 pandemic.

Conservative incumbent mayor Ben Houchen was seeking re-election, with Labour candidate Jessie Joe Jacobs challenging him.

== Background ==
The mayor serves as the directly elected leader of the Tees Valley Combined Authority and has powers considered lesser than those of other mayors such as Greater Manchester and the West of England. The mayor has power over an annual £15 million investment from the national government over a 30-year period, as well as control over adult skills training, social care and a consolidated transport budget- giving the ability to acquire bus services. The mayor does not supersede or overrule the five boroughs within the Tees Valley city-region.

At the previous and first election for the mayor of Tees Valley in 2017, the Conservative Party candidate Ben Houchen won with 51.2% of the vote in the second round, with a turnout of 21%. This victory was seen as a surprise since Tees Valley has traditionally been seen as a Labour stronghold. Some saw Houchen's victory as evidence that the Conservatives were going to do well in the following election, others described it as a "warning shot" at Labour from their voter base.

The urban think-tank Centre for Cities looked at the results of local elections in Tees Valley for 2018 and 2019 to make a prediction of the result and found Labour had suffered considerable losses, giving the Conservatives an advantage. Following the 2019 general election, the Centre for Cities also assessed the Tees Valley constituencies results and found the Conservatives polled 44% across all Tees Valley constituencies, whilst Labour polled 41%.

It was announced in March 2020 that the mayoral election was delayed to May 2021 due to the COVID-19 pandemic in the United Kingdom.

== Electoral system ==
The election used a supplementary vote system, in which voters express a first and a second preference for candidates.

- If a candidate receives more than 50% of the first preference vote, that candidate wins.
- If no candidate receives more than 50% of first preference votes, the top two candidates proceed to a second round and all other candidates are eliminated.
- The first preference votes for the remaining two candidates stand in the final count.
- Voters' ballots whose first and second preference candidates are eliminated are discarded.
- Voters whose first preference candidates have been eliminated and whose second preference candidate is one of the top two have their second preference votes added to that candidate's count.

This means that the winning candidate has the support of a majority of voters who expressed a preference among the top two.

All registered electors (British, Irish, Commonwealth and European Union citizens) living in Tees Valley aged 18 or over on 7 May 2020 were entitled to vote in the mayoral election. Those who are temporarily away from Tees Valley (for example, away working, on holiday, in student accommodation or in hospital) were also entitled to vote in the mayoral election. The deadline to register to vote in the election will be announced nearer the election.

== Candidates ==
=== Conservative Party ===
Ben Houchen, the incumbent mayor, launched his re-election campaign on 6 January 2020.

=== Labour Party ===
Jessie Joe Jacobs was announced as the Labour Party candidate for the city-region. Jacobs is the founder of the charity A Way Out in Stockton and created a media project that taught ordinary people skills to report news called “We Are Our Media”, which created a citizen newspaper called the Eclipse. Jacobs received endorsement from all seven local parties in the area, five trade unions and the Co-operative party.

Dan Smith, an engineer and staffer for Paul Williams, Labour's former MP for Stockton South, also applied; however, he was not shortlisted.

=== Liberal Democrats ===
The Liberal Democrats decided not to stand a candidate in the 2021 election, despite declaring an intention to do so prior to the election's postponement.

== Campaign ==
The incumbent mayor Ben Houchen launched his initial campaign for this election – prior to its delay – in January 2020, emphasising on investment in the steel industry in Tees Valley. On 9 February it was revealed Houchen was in talks to purchase the former steelworks site in Redcar, which closed in 2015 when Sahaviriya Steel Industries's UK wing went out of business.

Labour's candidate Jessie Joe Jacobs launched her campaign at the Hartlepool College of Further Education. Her core pledges for this election are to tackle mental health across the city-region where suicide rates are high, to build a new vocation centre in all five boroughs, to start a high street innovation fund to help fill closed down retail spaces and to improve transport. She advocated expanding bus and rail services in the city-region over the next ten years. This includes restarting the Tees Valley Metro project, which was stopped in 2010. Additionally, she is supportive of building a new bridge to improve transport between Hartlepool and South Teesside to help relieve pressure on the A19 and A66. Jacobs has planned to bid to host the Festival of Great Britain and Northern Ireland, a government proposed festival with £125 million prepared for it, in 2022, branding it as the "Festival of Teesside".

On 10 November 2019, Jacobs was critical of the price Houchen arranged for Teesside Airport, which Houchen's administration had taken into public ownership, saying that the previous owner received much more than she would have allowed, considering they wanted to get rid of it. Furthermore, on 11 February 2020, Jacobs was critical of Ben Houchen's lack of transparency over subsiding flight routes out of Teesside Airport rather than expanding bus routes around the city region.

A hustings organised by Centre for Cities, the Institution of Civil Engineers and Teesside University was due to take place on 23 April 2020 but was cancelled due to the COVID-19 pandemic.

In January 2021, internal party polling by the Labour Party found that Houchen had a strong lead over Labour, with The Guardian reporting that the poll showed Houchen winning outright with 66% of the vote.

== Opinion polls ==
Graph of opinion polls conducted

Pollster	Client	Date(s) conducted	Sample size	Houchen	Jacobs	Others	Lead
Pollster	Client	Date(s) conducted	Sample size	Con	Lab	Others	Lead
Election		6 May 2021		72.8%	27.2%	–	45.6%
Opinium	The Times	19–26 Apr 2021	971	63%	37%	–	26%
YouGov	Labour	1–8 Jan 2021	?	66%	34%	–	32%
Election		4 May 2017		39.5%	39%	21.5%	0.5%

== Result ==
The Conservative Party held the mayoralty overwhelmingly.

2021 Tees Valley Mayoral Election vote share map by local authority.

2021 Tees Valley Combined Authority Mayor
Party	Candidate	Votes	%	±%
Conservative	Ben Houchen	121,964	72.8	▲33.3
Labour Co-op	Jessie Joe Jacobs	45,641	27.2	▼11.8

=== By local authority ===
==== Darlington ====
2021 Tees Valley Combined Authority Mayor
Party	Candidate	Votes	%	±%
Conservative	Ben Houchen	19,876	74.5	▲32.6
Labour Co-op	Jessie Joe Jacobs	6,799	25.5	▼7.2

==== Hartlepool ====
2021 Tees Valley Combined Authority Mayor
Party	Candidate	Votes	%	±%
Conservative	Ben Houchen	21,257	72.6	▲45.8
Labour Co-op	Jessie Joe Jacobs	8,023	27.4	▼7.8

==== Middlesbrough ====
2021 Tees Valley Combined Authority Mayor
Party	Candidate	Votes	%	±%
Conservative	Ben Houchen	17,748	68.6	▲33.7
Labour Co-op	Jessie Joe Jacobs	8,141	31.4	▼16.1

==== Redcar and Cleveland ====
2021 Tees Valley Combined Authority Mayor
Party	Candidate	Votes	%	±%
Conservative	Ben Houchen	24,663	75.0	▲39.6
Labour Co-op	Jessie Joe Jacobs	8,236	25.0	▼19.4

==== Stockton-on-Tees ====
2021 Tees Valley Combined Authority Mayor
Party	Candidate	Votes	%	±%
Conservative	Ben Houchen	38,420	72.7	▲25.0
Labour Co-op	Jessie Joe Jacobs	14,442	27.3	▼8.3
