= 2017 Tees Valley mayoral election =

First mayoral election in the Tees Valley

- 4 May 2017
- Turnout: 21.3%
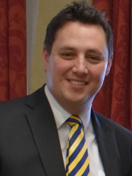
Candidate	Ben Houchen	Sue Jeffrey
Party	Conservative	Labour Co-op
1st Round vote	40,278	39,797
Percentage	39.5%	39.0%
2nd Round vote	48,578	46,400
Percentage	51.1%	48.9%
Candidate	Chris Foote Wood	John Tennant
Party	Liberal Democrats	UKIP
1st Round vote	12,550	9,475
Percentage	12.3%	9.3%
2nd Round vote	Eliminated	Eliminated
Percentage	Eliminated	Eliminated
Mayor before election
Position established
Leader of the Tees Valley Combined Authority
Mayor
Ben Houchen
Conservative

The inaugural Tees Valley mayoral election was held on 4 May 2017 to elect the mayor of the Tees Valley Combined Authority in North West England. The mayor was elected by the supplementary vote system. Subsequent elections were held in May 2021 and every four years after 2024.

North East England was considered a Labour stronghold and prior to the election, the Labour candidate Sue Jeffrey was considered the overwhelming favourite. The eventual victory of the Conservative candidate Ben Houchen was reported as a shock and a poor result for Labour following their losses in the local elections that same day.

== Background ==
Following a devolution deal between the UK government and the Tees Valley Combined Authority (TVCA), it was agreed to introduce a directly elected mayor for the combined authority, with an initial election to be held in May 2017. The Cities and Local Government Devolution Act 2016 required a directly elected metro mayor for combined authorities to receive additional powers from central government.

== Candidates ==
=== Conservative Party ===
Ben Houchen, Conservative group leader on Stockton-on-Tees Borough Council.

=== Labour Party ===
Sue Jeffrey, Redcar and Cleveland Council leader.

=== Liberal Democrats ===
Chris Foote Wood, author and former Bishop Auckland district councillor, was selected to be the Liberal Democrat candidate after defeating Anne-Marie Curry, Liberal Democrat group leader on Darlington Borough Council, in a ballot of party members.

=== North East Party ===
John Tait, former Parliamentary candidate in Stockton North, withdrew from the race after failing to raise the £5,000 deposit needed to stand as a candidate.

=== UK Independence ===
John Tennant, UKIP group leader on Hartlepool Borough Council.

== Results ==
=== Overall ===
Tees Valley Mayoral Election 2017
Party	Candidate	1st round		2nd round			1st round votesTransfer votes, 2nd round
Party	Candidate	Total	Of round	Transfers	Total	Of round	1st round votesTransfer votes, 2nd round
Conservative	Ben Houchen	40,278	39.5%	8,300	48,578	51.1%	
Labour Co-op	Sue Jeffrey	39,797	39.0%	6,603	46,400	48.9%	
Liberal Democrats	Chris Foote Wood	12,550	12.3%				
UKIP	John Tennant	9,475	9.3%				
Turnout		103,767	21.3%				

=== By local authority ===
==== Darlington ====
Tees Valley Mayoral Election 2017 (Darlington)
Party	Candidate	1st round		2nd round			1st round votesTransfer votes, 2nd round
Party	Candidate	Total	Of round	Transfers	Total	Of round	1st round votesTransfer votes, 2nd round
Conservative	Ben Houchen	7,155	41.9%	1,708	8,863	56.2%	
Labour Co-op	Sue Jeffrey	5,571	32.7%	1,343	6,914	43.8%	
Liberal Democrats	Chris Foote Wood	3,395	19.9%				
UKIP	John Tennant	938	5.5%				
Turnout		17,059					

==== Hartlepool ====
Tees Valley Mayoral Election 2017 (Hartlepool)
Party	Candidate	1st round		2nd round			1st round votesTransfer votes, 2nd round
Party	Candidate	Total	Of round	Transfers	Total	Of round	1st round votesTransfer votes, 2nd round
Labour Co-op	Sue Jeffrey	4,242	35.2%	1,250	5,492	53.2%	
UKIP	John Tennant	3,486	28.9%				
Conservative	Ben Houchen	3,233	26.8%	1,607	4,840	46.8%	
Liberal Democrats	Chris Foote Wood	1,102	9.1%				
Turnout		12,063					

==== Middlesbrough ====
Tees Valley Mayoral Election 2017 (Middlesbrough)
Party	Candidate	1st round		2nd round			1st round votesTransfer votes, 2nd round
Party	Candidate	Total	Of round	Transfers	Total	Of round	1st round votesTransfer votes, 2nd round
Labour Co-op	Sue Jeffrey	8,470	47.5%	969	9,439	55.9%	
Conservative	Ben Houchen	6,223	34.9%	1,210	7,433	44.1%	
Liberal Democrats	Chris Foote Wood	1,887	10.6%				
UKIP	John Tennant	1,243	10.6%				
Turnout		17,823					

==== Redcar and Cleveland ====
Tees Valley Mayoral Election 2017 (Redcar and Cleveland)
Party	Candidate	1st round		2nd round			1st round votesTransfer votes, 2nd round
Party	Candidate	Total	Of round	Transfers	Total	Of round	1st round votesTransfer votes, 2nd round
Labour Co-op	Sue Jeffrey	9,471	44.4%	1,189	10,660	53.7%	
Conservative	Ben Houchen	7,555	35.4%	1,628	9,183	46.3%	
Liberal Democrats	Chris Foote Wood	2,740	12.8%				
UKIP	John Tennant	1,576	7.4%				
Turnout		21,342					

==== Stockton-on-Tees ====
Tees Valley Mayoral Election 2017 (Stockton-on-Tees)
Party	Candidate	1st round		2nd round			1st round votesTransfer votes, 2nd round
Party	Candidate	Total	Of round	Transfers	Total	Of round	1st round votesTransfer votes, 2nd round
Conservative	Ben Houchen	16,112	47.7%	2,147	18,259	56.8%	
Labour Co-op	Sue Jeffrey	12,043	35.6%	1,852	13,895	43.2%	
Liberal Democrats	Chris Foote Wood	3,426	10.1%				
UKIP	John Tennant	2,232	6.6%				
Turnout		33,813					
