= Tees Valley Mayor =

Mayoralty in England

Mayor of the Tees Valley

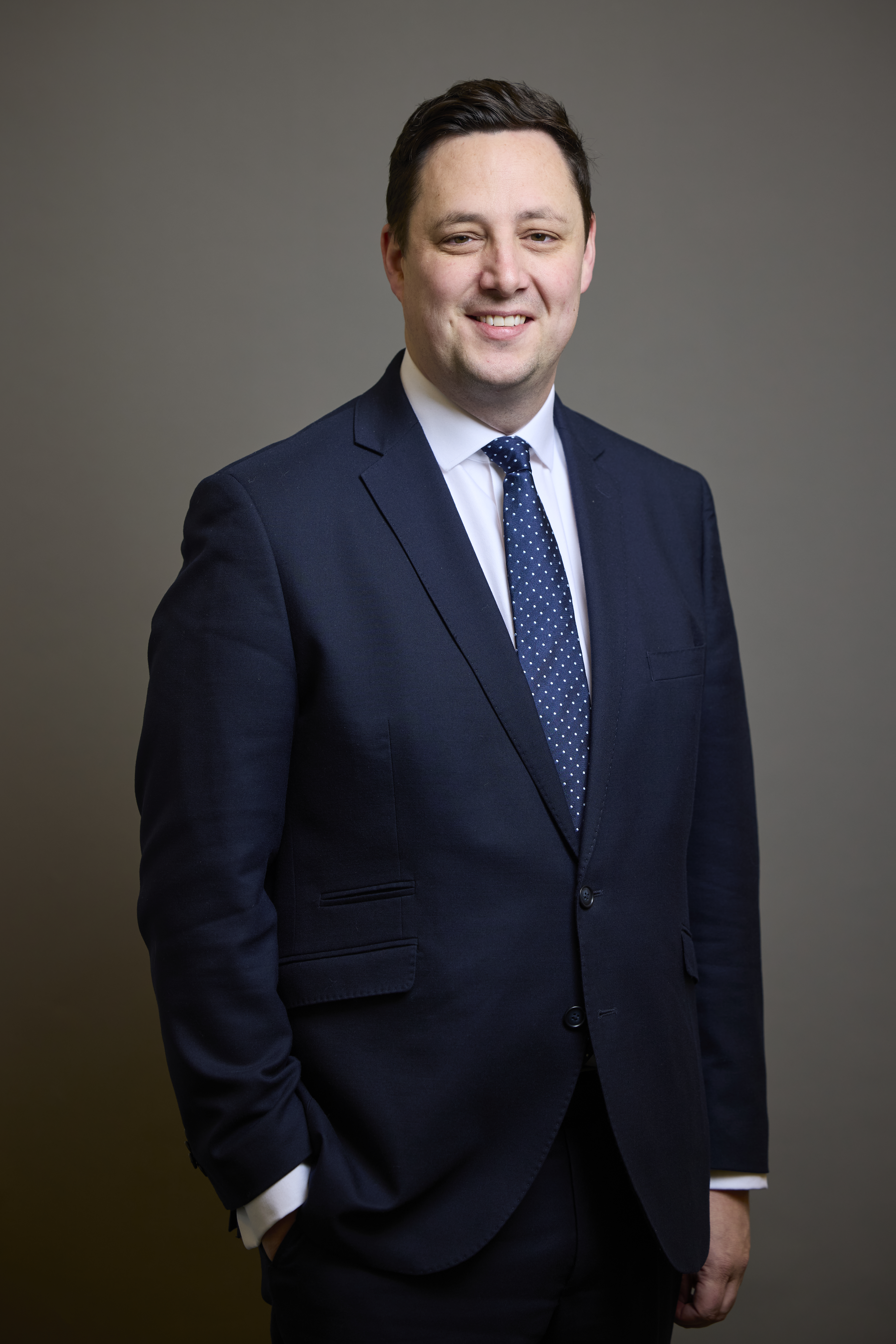
- Incumbent; The Lord Houchen of High Leven since 8 May 2017
- Tees Valley Combined Authority
- Style: Mr Mayor
- Appointer: Directly elected
- Term length: 4 years
- Constituting instrument: Cities and Local Government Devolution Act 2016
- Inaugural holder: The Lord Houchen of High Leven
- Salary: £65,000
- Website: http://www.teesvalley-ca.gov.uk

The mayor of the Tees Valley, commonly known as the Tees Valley Mayor (also styled as the metro mayor of the Tees Valley), is a strategic authority mayor in England, first elected in May 2017. The mayor is leader of the Tees Valley Combined Authority.

The office was created under the Cities and Local Government Devolution Act 2016, which allowed for the creation of metro mayors to lead combined authorities in England. The election scheduled for 7 May 2020 was held on 6 May 2021 due to the COVID-19 pandemic. The following election was held on 2 May 2024. The next election is due in May 2028.

The mayor is a member of the Mayoral Council for England and the Council of the Nations and Regions.

== List of mayors ==
#	Portrait	Name (Birth–Death)	Term of office		Elected	Political party	Previous, concurrent and subsequent political offices	Education
1		The Lord Houchen of High Leven (born 1986)	8 May 2017	Incumbent	2017 2021 2024	Conservative	Councillor for Yarm Ward (2011–2017); Member of the House of Lords (2023-present)	Northumbria University
1		The Lord Houchen of High Leven (born 1986)	9 years, 198 days		2017 2021 2024	Conservative	Councillor for Yarm Ward (2011–2017); Member of the House of Lords (2023-present)	Northumbria University

== List of deputy mayors ==
Name	Term of office		Political party	Other position(s)
Bob Cook	8 May 2017	28 June 2019	Labour	Leader of Borough of Stockton-on-Tees
Shane Moore	28 June 2019	27 June 2024	Independent Union	Leader of Hartlepool Borough Council
Brenda Harrison	27 June 2024	21 May 2026	Labour	Leader of Hartlepool Borough Council
Sue Little	21 May 2026	incumbent	Independent	Leader of Hartlepool Borough Council
