= Tees Valley Combined Authority =

Strategic authority and combined authority in England

Type
- Type: Combined authority of Tees Valley
- Houses: Unicameral
- Term limits: None

History
- Founded: 1 April 2016

Leadership
- Mayor: Ben Houchen, Conservative since 8 May 2017
- Chief Executive: Tom Bryant since June 2025

Structure
- Seats: Tees Valley Mayor and 5 constituent authority members
- Political groups: Labour (4) Conservative (1) Reform UK (1)

Elections
- Voting system: Directly elected mayor since 2017
- Last election: 2 May 2024
- Next election: 4 May 2028

Meeting place
- Teesside Airport Business Suite, Teesside International Airport, Darlington, DL2 1NJ

Website
- teesvalley-ca.gov.uk

The Tees Valley Combined Authority (TVCA) is the combined authority for the Tees Valley strategic authority area in North East England. It consists of the following five unitary authorities: Darlington, Hartlepool, Middlesbrough, Redcar and Cleveland, and Stockton-on-Tees. It is a strategic authority with powers over transport, economic development and regeneration including the flagship Teesside Freeport.

The strategic authority governs a population of approximately 700,000 people. Its area is divided between the ceremonial counties of North Yorkshire and County Durham.

The strategic authority was established on 1 April 2016, after Local Government Minister James Wharton MP signed the necessary Order. It was first proposed that a combined authority be established by statutory instrument under the Local Democracy, Economic Development and Construction Act 2009. It was announced in October 2015 that voters in the region covered by the Authority would directly elect a Mayor in 2017.

== History ==
The abolition of the non-metropolitan county of Cleveland in 1996 left the Tees Valley without a single authority covering the whole area, although some council functions continued to be provided jointly through Cleveland Police and the Cleveland Fire Brigade.

A combined authority was proposed in 2014 and sixty-five per cent of more than 1,900 responses received during a seven-week long public consultation were in favour of a combined authority.

A shadow combined authority was formed and chaired by Sue Jeffrey, Leader of Redcar and Cleveland Borough Council.

== Membership ==
The authority consists of the five local authorities of Tees Valley as constituent members, the directly elected Mayor of Tees Valley as the chair, and the Chairman of the Tees Valley local enterprise partnership as an associate member. The mayor is a member of the Mayoral Council for England and the Council of the Nations and Regions.

As of October 2026, the composition of the combined authority was:

Name	Membership	Nominating authority	Position within nominating authority
Ben Houchen	Chair	Tees Valley Combined Authority	Tees Valley Mayor
Steve Harker	Constituent	Darlington Borough Council	Leader of the Council
Dave Bruce	Constituent	Hartlepool Borough Council	Leader of the Council
Chris Cooke	Constituent	Middlesbrough Borough Council	Mayor of Middlesbrough
Alec Brown	Constituent	Redcar and Cleveland Borough Council	Leader of the Council
Lisa Evans	Constituent	Stockton-on-Tees Borough Council	Leader of the Council
Matthew Ord	Non-constituent	Tees Valley Combined Authority Business Board	Chair of the TVCA Business Board

== Demographics ==
=== Population ===
Population of Tees Valley by district (2025)
District	Land area		Population		Density (/km^{2})
District	(km^{2})	(%)	People	(%)	Density (/km^{2})
Darlington	197	25%	113,402	16%	574
Hartlepool	94	12%	99,656	14%	1,063
Middlesbrough	54	7%	152,795	21%	2,836
Redcar and Cleveland	245	31%	139,541	20%	569
Stockton-on-Tees	205	26%	207,158	29%	1,011
Tees Valley	795	100%	712,552	100%	896

=== Religion ===
2021 Religious Data
Religion	Tees Valley CA (Approximate)		England %
Religion	Capita	%	England %
No religion	264,108	39.0	36.7
Christian	343,340	50.7	46.3
Buddhist	2,032	0.3	0.5
Hindu	3,386	0.5	1.8
Jewish	–	0.0 (Note: The percentage may not equal 0% in the census, but rather the value is too small to represent in the provided accuracy. It may also not be publicly released for data protection reasons if the sample is too small.)	0.5
Muslim	25,734	3.8	6.7
Sikh	2,032	0.3	0.9
Other religion	2,032	0.3	0.6
Not answered	35,214	5.2	6.0

=== Ethnicity and Identity ===
2021 Ethnicity of Tees Valley
Category	Tees Valley CA	England
Asian, Asian British or Asian Welsh	4.4%	9.6%
Black, Black British, Black Welsh, Caribbean or African	1.1%	4.2%
Mixed or Multiple ethnic groups	1.3%	3%
White	92.1%	81%
Other ethnic group	1.1%	2.2%

== See also ==
- Cleveland (county)
- Teesside
- Tees Valley
- Tees Valley Mayor
