= Strategic authority mayor =

Directly elected position in England

Areas of England with a strategic authority mayor as of 2026: Labour Party mayor Conservative Party mayor Reform UK mayor New strategic authority mayors planned to be elected in 2027 and 2028 North Somerset, planned to be added to the existing West of England Combined Authority

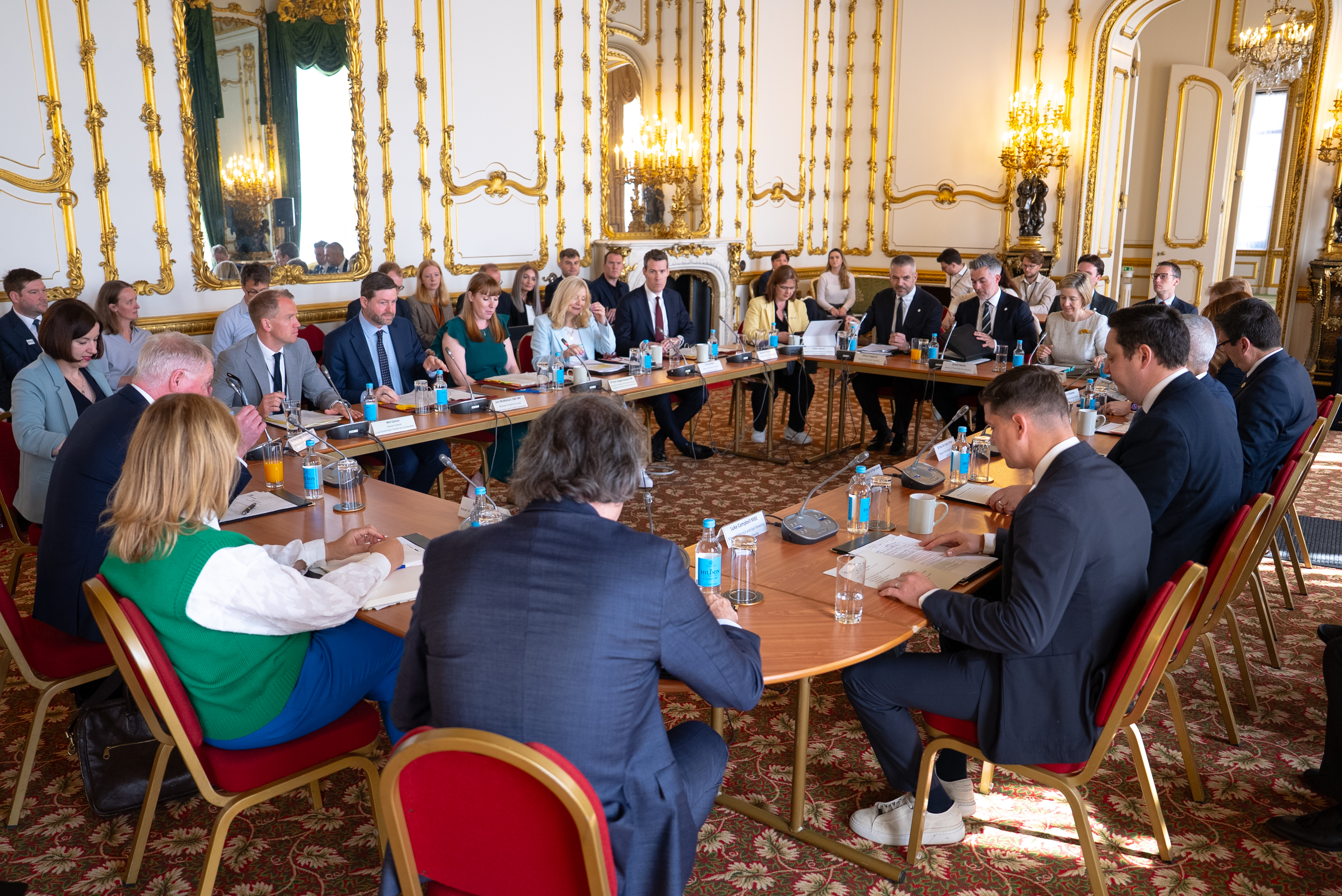
Strategic authority mayors participating in a meeting of the Mayoral Council for England, May 2025.

In England, a strategic authority mayor (also referred to as metro mayor, regional mayor or simply mayor) is a directly elected political leader who is leader of a strategic authority. The term strategic authority mayor was introduced as part of the English Devolution and Community Empowerment Act 2026 to cover the mayor of London and mayors of combined authorities and combined county authorities.

The first strategic authority mayoral post was the mayor of London, created as the executive of the Greater London Authority (GLA) in 2000 as part of a reform of the local government of Greater London. More strategic authority mayors were introduced following in the Cities and Local Government Devolution Act 2016.

Strategic authority mayors sit on the Mayoral Council for England, the National Economic Council, and Council of the Nations and Regions alongside the UK Prime Minister and First Ministers of devolved governments.

== Naming ==
"Strategic authority mayor" is a term introduced in 2024, made statutory in 2026 and applied retrospectively to existing mayoralties. The mayors are sometimes known as "metro mayors", "regional mayors" or "devolved mayors". Reflecting that the first wave of mayors covered metropolitan areas, some cover larger regions, and their role in implementing devolution in England.

== History ==
=== Mayor of London ===
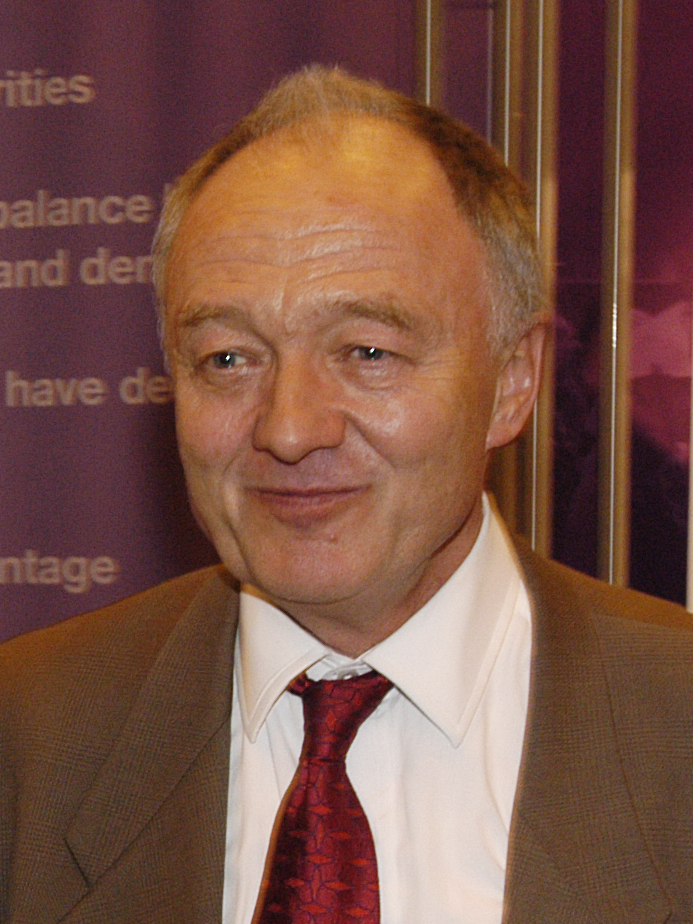
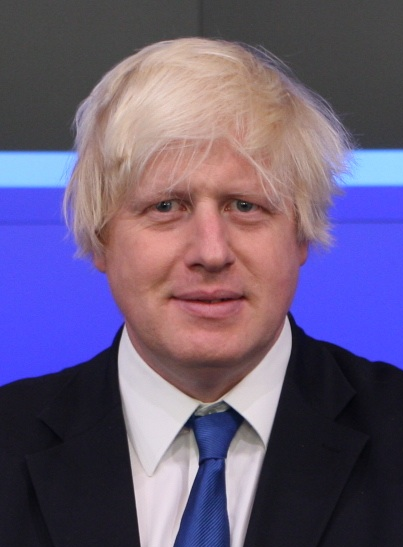
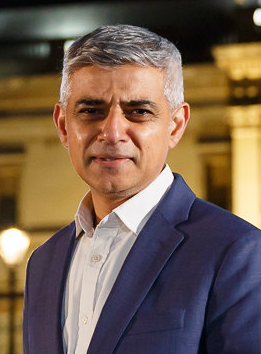
The three mayors of London (left to right) Ken Livingstone, Boris Johnson and Sadiq Khan

The first directly elected mayor in England was introduced in Greater London in 2000 as part of the statutory provisions of the Greater London Authority Act 1999. The position of the elected Mayor of London is a strategic regional one, and quite different from that of local authority mayors. The work of the mayor of London is scrutinised by the London Assembly, a unique arrangement in the English local government system. The mayor of London cannot be removed from office by a referendum following a petition, as is the case for directly elected mayors elsewhere in England.

The mayor of London should not be confused with the ancient position of Lord Mayor of London, elected annually by liverymen of the City of London.

=== Expansion ===
In 2014, it was announced that directly elected mayors would be created for combined authorities (CAs), subject to new primary legislation. In 2017, inaugural elections were held for mayors of Liverpool City Region, Greater Manchester, Tees Valley, Cambridgeshire and Peterborough, West of England, and the West Midlands. These directly elected mayoralties were agreed as part of the devolution deals allowed by the Cities and Local Government Devolution Act 2016. That act inserted sections into the Local Democracy, Economic Development and Construction Act 2009 for the election of mayors of CAs.

A delayed election for the Sheffield City Region followed in May 2018. The North of Tyne Combined Authority and the North East Combined Authority (2014–2024) were merged into the new North East Mayoral Combined Authority, the first election for which took place in May 2024.

=== Levelling-up and Regeneration Act 2023 ===
The Levelling-up and Regeneration Act 2023 enabled the creation of combined county authorities (CCAs), which are similar to the existing CAs. The act enabled new powers to be devolved to CAs and CCAs. It also allowed strategic authority mayors to take a different title, including "elected leader", "governor",and "county commissioner". As of 2026, no mayors have taken a different title.

== Powers ==
Strategic authority mayors have cover larger areas than directly elected local authority mayors and have responsibilities devolved from the UK government. They generally have powers over transport, skills, housing, and local infrastructure investment, and sometimes over spatial planning, policing, health and employment support.

== UK Mayors Network ==
Combined (county) authority mayors and the Mayor of London meet informally on a monthly basis as the UK Mayors Network (M10 Group) allowing them to consult each other, coordinate their actions, and gain access to UK government ministers.

From 2022 to 2026, it was chaired by Tracy Brabin since May 2022 and previously by Dan Jarvis. Since 2026, it has been chaired by Claire Ward.

== List of strategic authority mayors ==
As of June 2026, there are 14 mayors of strategic authorities in England.

Authority	Post	Category	Current mayor	Party	First election	Next election	Population (2020)
Cambridgeshire and Peterborough Combined Authority	Mayor of Cambridgeshire and Peterborough	Established mayoral	Paul Bristow	Conservative	2017	2029	859,800
East Midlands Combined County Authority	Mayor of the East Midlands	Established mayoral	Claire Ward	Labour Co-op	2024	2028	1,363,000
Greater Lincolnshire Combined County Authority	Mayor of Greater Lincolnshire	Mayoral	Andrea Jenkyns	Reform	2025	2029	1,103,320
Greater London Authority	Mayor of London	Established mayoral	Sadiq Khan	Labour	2000	2028	8,547,000
Greater Manchester Combined Authority	Mayor of Greater Manchester	Established mayoral	Bev Craig	Labour Co-op	2017	2028	2,848,300
Hull and East Yorkshire Combined Authority	Mayor of Hull and East Yorkshire	Mayoral	Luke Campbell	Reform	2025	2029	
Liverpool City Region Combined Authority	Mayor of the Liverpool City Region	Established mayoral	Steve Rotheram	Labour	2017	2028	1,564,000
North East Mayoral Strategic Authority	Mayor of the North East	Established mayoral	Kim McGuinness	Labour Co-op	2024	2028	2,567,000
South Yorkshire Mayoral Combined Authority	Mayor of South Yorkshire	Established mayoral	Oliver Coppard	Labour Co-op	2018	2028	1,415,100
Tees Valley Combined Authority	Mayor of the Tees Valley	Mayoral	Ben Houchen	Conservative	2017	2028	677,200
West Midlands Combined Authority	Mayor of the West Midlands	Established mayoral	Richard Parker	Labour Co-op	2017	2028	2,939,900
West of England Combined Authority	Mayor of the West of England	Established mayoral	Helen Godwin	Labour	2017	2029	950,000
West Yorkshire Combined Authority	Mayor of West Yorkshire	Established mayoral	Tracy Brabin	Labour Co-op	2021	2028	2,345,200
York and North Yorkshire Combined Authority	Mayor of York and North Yorkshire	Established mayoral	David Skaith	Labour Co-op	2024	2028	820,500

=== Upcoming mayoralties ===
Authority	Post	Status	First election
Cheshire and Warrington Combined Authority	Mayor of Cheshire and Warrington	Authority established 24 February 2026, awaiting mayoral powers	2027
Cumbria Combined Authority	Mayor of Cumbria	Authority established 24 February 2026, awaiting mayoral powers	2027
Sussex and Brighton Combined County Authority	Mayor of Sussex and Brighton	Authority established 26 March 2026, awaiting mayoral powers	2028
Hampshire and the Solent Combined County Authority	Mayor of Hampshire and the Solent	Authority established 4 June 2026, awaiting mayoral powers	2028
Greater Essex Combined County Authority	Mayor of Greater Essex	Authority approved, not yet formally established	2028 (planned)
Norfolk and Suffolk Combined County Authority	Mayor of Norfolk and Suffolk	Authority approved, not yet formally established	2028 (planned)

=== Proposed mayoralties ===
In the 2026 budget, several areas were proposed to have a mayor:

- Devon
- Hertfordshire
- Lancashire
- Leicestershire
- Staffordshire
- Surrey
- Thames Valley
- Wessex

=== Former mayoralties ===
Authority	Post	Category	Final mayor	Party	First election	Dissolved	Replaced by
North of Tyne Combined Authority	Mayor of the North of Tyne	Mayoral	Jamie Driscoll	Independent	2019	2024	North East Mayoral Combined Authority

== See also ==
- Directly elected local authority mayors
