= 2024 North East mayoral election =

- 2 May 2024
- Turnout: 31%
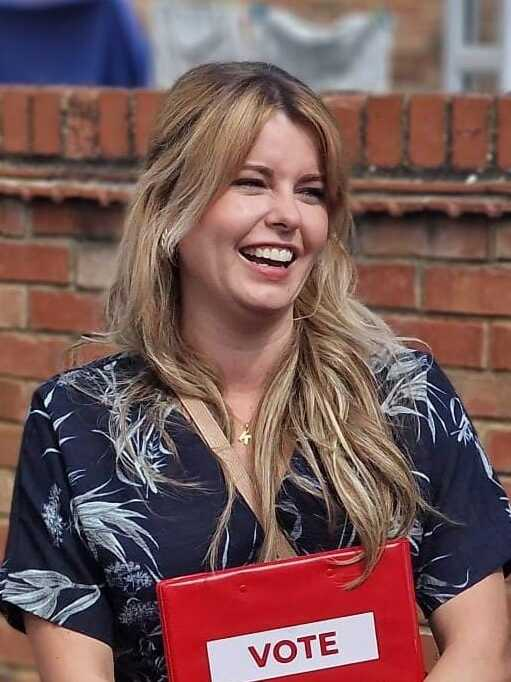

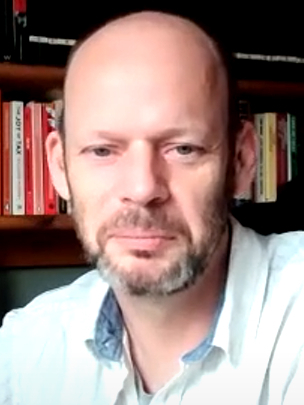

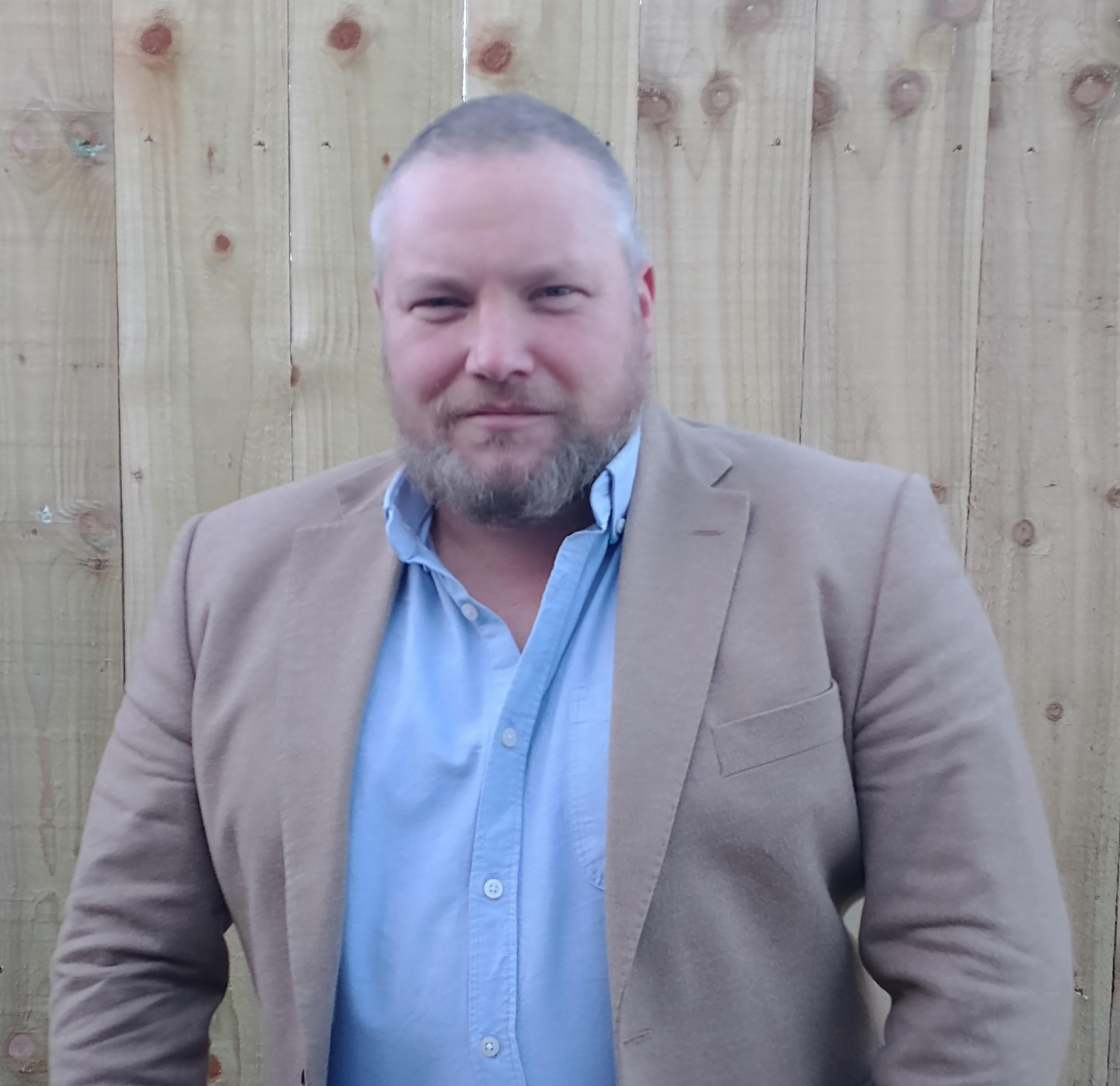

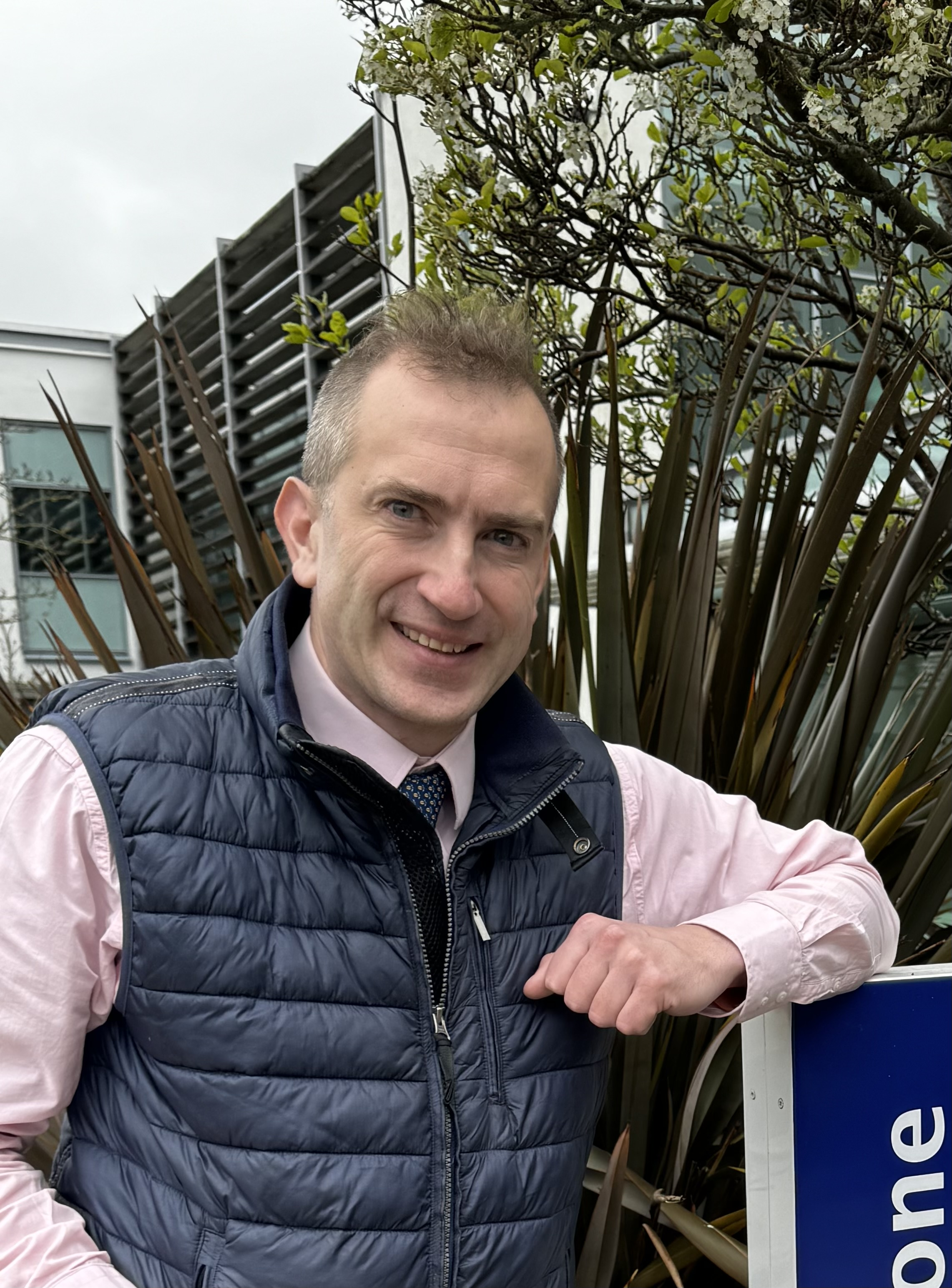
Candidate	Kim McGuinness	Jamie Driscoll	Guy Renner-Thompson
Party	Labour Co-op	Independent	Conservative
Popular vote	185,051	126,652	52,446
Percentage	41.3%	28.2%	11.7%
Candidate	Paul Donaghy	Aidan King	Andrew Gray
Party	Reform	Liberal Democrats	Green
Popular vote	41,147	25,485	17,631
Percentage	9.2%	5.7%	3.9%
- Election result by council areas
Elected Mayor
Kim McGuinness
Labour Co-op

The 2024 North East mayoral election was held on 2 May 2024 to elect the first mayor of the North East, a role created under the North East devolution deal announced in 2022. The election took place the same day as council elections within the region, as well as local elections across England and Wales.

The winner was Kim McGuinness of the Labour and Co-operative Party, with independent candidate Jamie Driscoll, who had been the Labour North of Tyne elected mayor before leaving the party to contest the election, in second place.

== Background ==
The North East Mayoral Combined Authority is due to come into existence four days after this election, on 7 May 2024. The authority will replace the North of Tyne Mayoral Combined Authority and the North East Combined Authority.

The mayoral combined authority has a budget and powers relating to growth, adult education and skills, housing and regeneration.

== Electoral system ==
While previous mayoral elections in the United Kingdom have used a supplementary vote (SV) system, this election used a first-past-the-post (FPTP) system to elect the mayor as a result of the changes made by the Elections Act 2022.

All registered electors living in the North East aged 18 or over on 2 May 2024 were entitled to vote in the mayoral election. Those who were temporarily away from the North East (for example, away working, on holiday, in student accommodation or in hospital) were also entitled to vote in the mayoral election. The deadline to register to vote in the election was 11:59pm on 16 April 2024.

== Campaign ==
Tyneside was suggested as a potential location for another barge like Bibby Stockholm to be used to house asylum-seekers. The Labour candidate Kim McGuinness and the independent candidate Jamie Driscoll both said they opposed any such proposals.

On transport, Driscoll proposed a "total transport network" covering buses and the Tyne and Wear Metro. This would mean he would "take the buses back under public control, open new rail routes around the region, integrate public transport and make one ticket for rail, bus and metro and lower fare, making them free altogether for under 18s". He also proposed "on demand" bus services for rural areas. McGuinness said she would get public control of buses and "build new railway infrastructure". The Conservative candidate Guy Renner-Thompson said he would turn the A1 road into a dual carriageway. He supported integrating bus and rail transport but opposed public ownership. The Reform UK candidate Paul Donaghy proposed 50% public ownership of public transport. The Green Party candidate Andrew Gray said he supported 15-minute city principles that would reduce demand for transport.

Newcastle implemented a Clean Air Zone in the city centre in 2022. Renner-Thompson said he would remove it, which local authorities said the mayor would not be able to do. The Reform UK candidate Paul Donaghy, Driscoll and McGuinness all criticised the model, saying that public transport was a better way of improving air quality. The Green Party candidate Andrew Gray and the Liberal Democrat candidate Aidan King both supported the use of Clean Air Zones.

The Conservative UK government proposed using money that had been planned for High Speed 2 to re-open the Leamside line, estimated to cost close to £2 billion. They later said that the combined authority could fund it. Renner Thompson said that the suggested cost was far too high for "some metal rails on some gravel". Driscoll and McGuinness said they were seeking central government funding for the estimated £20 million cost of producing a business case to reopen the railway.

Driscoll said he would work to achieve full employment in the region. McGuinness proposed a "mayoral development corporation to drive green energy investment in the North East's ports and rivers". Grey said he would improve housing installation. King said he would "build the UK's largest on-shore wind farm", revenue from which would fund public transport investment, and buy low quality farmland in "every town and village" to build modern housing.

A film company proposed establishing a large film studio in the region contingent on public funding. McGuinness said that the UK government should supply the necessary funding, while Renner-Thompson said he would use combined authority funds to support the proposal.

Tony Gillan in the Sunderland Echo highlighted that all of the candidates were from or closely associated with Newcastle rather than other parts of the region.

Driscoll was endorsed by the National Union of Rail, Maritime and Transport Workers.

== Candidates ==
=== Independent ===
Jamie Driscoll, the mayor of the North of Tyne, left the Labour Party after being excluded from the party's selection of a North East mayoral candidate. He sat as an independent for the remainder of his term. He said he would run as an independent candidate for the North East mayoralty if he could raise £25,000 in campaign funds, which he did in two hours. Five Labour councillors resigned from their party to support Driscoll.

=== Labour Party ===
Four candidates were nominated. Serving North of Tyne Mayor Jamie Driscoll. PCC Kim McGuinness. Former MEP Paul Brannen. Newcastle City Councillor Nicu Ion.

Driscoll was elected to Newcastle City Council in 2018 to represent Monument ward. Driscoll stood for selection to be Labour's candidate in the 2019 North of Tyne mayoral election, defeating Newcastle council leader Nick Forbes in February 2019. He ran as the more radical candidate after being supported by left-wing figures, including shadow Chancellor John McDonnell, Noam Chomsky, Paul Mason, Clive Lewis and Laura Pidcock. He also had organisational support from Unite the Union, RMT, Fire Brigades Union, TSSA and Aslef.

Driscoll ran on a platform with five primary pledges: Community Wealth Building, Green Industrial Revolution, Setting up Community Hubs, Building Affordable Homes, and Meaningful Adult Education, winning the 2019 North of Tyne mayoral election with 56.1% of the vote. His role was due to be subsumed by the new North East mayoralty.

McGuinness was elected Northumbria Police and Crime Commissioner in 2019. She had served on Newcastle City Council since 2015. She said that everything she would fund as mayor would need to contribute to ending child poverty. She also proposed a £1-per-night hotel levy to raise money to invest in culture and events. She is considered to be aligned with Labour Party leader Keir Starmer.

Brannen served as an MEP for North East England from 2014 to 2019. He said he would use green industry to achieve full employment in the region.

Nicu Ion is a maths teacher who was first elected to Newcastle City Council in 2021, becoming the first Roma migrant to be elected in the UK.

In June 2023, Driscoll was barred from the selection process to determine a Labour Party candidate for Mayor of the North East. The controversial decision was defended by Starmer-ally Baroness Chapman of Darlington as "simply guaranteeing the highest quality candidates". Unite the Union and its general secretary, Sharon Graham, criticised the decision to exclude Driscoll. Andy Burnham, and Steve Rotheram described the Labour Party as undemocratic, opaque and unfair. Aditya Chakrabortty wrote in The Guardian that Driscoll was a "victim of McCarthyism". It was understood that the decision was based on appearing at an event with Ken Loach. He later resigned from Labour and has since announced he will fight the 2024 North East mayoral election as an independent.

Subsequently, 11 of 22 constituency Labour parties in the region refused to endorse any mayoral candidate in protest.

Ion was not shortlisted, leaving members to choose between Brannen and McGuinness. McGuinness won selection with 76% of the vote. However, the number of votes in the selection contest was never published, unlike the 2019 selection. A Labour source said under 50% of eligible party members voted.

On 17 July 2023, Labour announced it had selected McGuinness as its candidate for mayor.

Candidate	Votes	%
Kim McGuinness		76%
Paul Brannen		24%

=== Conservative ===
Charlie Hoult, who was the Conservative candidate in the 2019 North of Tyne mayoral election, said he would not seek his party's selection and that he hoped the candidates would be more diverse than in the 2019 election. On 26 November 2023, it was announced that Guy Renner-Thompson, the children's and education chief for Northumberland County Council would be the Conservative Party candidate for the election.

=== Liberal Democrats ===
Aidan King, an NHS doctor at Newcastle's Royal Victoria Infirmary, former Newcastle City Councillor and candidate for the European Parliament, was selected as the Liberal Democrats candidate. He was their candidate in Stockton North in the 2019 General Election.

=== Green Party ===
Andrew Gray, an archivist at Durham University, was announced as the Green Party candidate in December 2023.

=== Reform UK ===
Paul Donaghy, a councillor on Sunderland City Council, was announced as the Reform UK candidate in January 2024. He had defected from the Conservative Party in 2023.

== Opinion polling ==
Dates conducted	Pollster	Sample size	McGuinness Lab Co-op	Driscoll Ind	Donaghy Reform	Renner-Thompson Con	Gray Green	King Lib Dems	Lead
2 May 2024	2024 election	–	41.3%	28.2%	9.2%	11.7%	3.9%	5.7%	13.1
19–24 April 2024	More in Common	1,808	35%	33%	14%	11%	4%	4%	2

On 28 April, the campaign group More in Common released opinion polling placing McGuinness and Driscoll as the front runners, stating "a win from either candidate would be well within the margin of error."

They cited the 2019 Conservative vote fragmenting and Driscoll voters saying they are more likely to turn out than McGuinness voters as the cause of the independent vote, describing the race as a "dead heat."

== Election result ==
2024 North East mayoral election
Party	Candidate	Votes	%
Labour Co-op	Kim McGuinness	185,051	41.3
Independent	Jamie Driscoll	126,652	28.2
Conservative	Guy Renner-Thompson	52,446	11.7
Reform	Paul Donaghy	41,147	9.2
Liberal Democrats	Aidan King	25,485	5.7
Green	Andrew Gray	17,631	3.9
Majority		58,399	13.0
Turnout		448,412	31.0

=== Results by Local Authority ===
==== County Durham ====
2024 North East mayoral election in County Durham
Party	Candidate	Votes	%
Labour Co-op	Kim McGuinness	43,084	45.0
Independent	Jamie Driscoll	25,074	26.2
Conservative	Guy Renner-Thompson	11,627	12.1
Reform	Paul Donaghy	9,679	10.1
Liberal Democrats	Aidan King	3,907	4.1
Green	Andrew Gray	2,396	2.5
Majority		18,010	18.8
Turnout		95,767	24.7

==== Gateshead ====
2024 North East mayoral election in Gateshead
Party	Candidate	Votes	%
Labour Co-op	Kim McGuinness	21,994	44.3
Independent	Jamie Driscoll	12,438	25.1
Liberal Democrats	Aidan King	4,696	9.5
Reform	Paul Donaghy	4,421	8.9
Conservative	Guy Renner-Thompson	4,041	8.1
Green	Andrew Gray	2,013	4.1
Majority		9,556	19.3
Turnout		49,603	34.7

==== Newcastle-upon-Tyne ====
2024 North East mayoral election in Newcastle-upon-Tyne
Party	Candidate	Votes	%
Labour Co-op	Kim McGuinness	26,429	37.5
Independent	Jamie Driscoll	25,018	35.5
Liberal Democrats	Aidan King	6,778	9.6
Conservative	Guy Renner-Thompson	5,012	7.1
Green	Andrew Gray	3,671	5.2
Reform	Paul Donaghy	3,653	5.2
Majority		1,411	2.0
Turnout		70,561	37.4

==== Northumberland ====
2024 North East mayoral election in Northumberland
Party	Candidate	Votes	%
Labour Co-op	Kim McGuinness	27,992	38.0
Independent	Jamie Driscoll	22,736	30.9
Conservative	Guy Renner-Thompson	14,289	19.4
Reform	Paul Donaghy	4,437	6.0
Liberal Democrats	Aidan King	2,587	3.5
Green	Andrew Gray	1,638	2.2
Majority		5,256	7.1
Turnout		73,679	29.3

==== North Tyneside ====
2024 North East mayoral election in North Tyneside
Party	Candidate	Votes	%
Labour Co-op	Kim McGuinness	24,858	42.4
Independent	Jamie Driscoll	18,325	31.2
Conservative	Guy Renner-Thompson	7,874	13.4
Reform	Paul Donaghy	3,667	6.2
Green	Andrew Gray	2,173	3.7
Liberal Democrats	Aidan King	1,795	3.1
Majority		6,533	11.1
Turnout		58,962	37.1

==== South Tyneside ====
2024 North East mayoral election in South Tyneside
Party	Candidate	Votes	%
Labour Co-op	Kim McGuinness	13,225	36.2
Independent	Jamie Driscoll	12,052	33.0
Green	Andrew Gray	3,939	10.8
Reform	Paul Donaghy	3,727	10.2
Conservative	Guy Renner-Thompson	2,566	7.0
Liberal Democrats	Aidan King	995	2.7
Majority		1,173	3.2
Turnout		36,504	32.3

==== Sunderland ====
2024 North East mayoral election in Sunderland
Party	Candidate	Votes	%
Labour Co-op	Kim McGuinness	27,469	43.2
Reform	Paul Donaghy	11,563	18.2
Independent	Jamie Driscoll	11,009	17.3
Conservative	Guy Renner-Thompson	7,037	11.1
Liberal Democrats	Aidan King	4,727	7.4
Green	Andrew Gray	1,801	2.8
Majority		15,906	25.0
Turnout		63,606	30.4
