= North East Combined Authority (2014–2024) =

Former combined authority in north east England

North East Combined Authority Durham, Gateshead, South Tyneside and Sunderland Combined Authority

- North East Combined Authority within England

Type
- Type: Combined authority
- Houses: Unicameral
- Term limits: None

History
- Founded: 15 April 2014
- Disbanded: 7 May 2024
- Succeeded by: North East Mayoral Strategic Authority

Structure
- Joint committees: North East Joint Transport Committee

Elections
- Voting system: Indirect election
- Last election: 15 April 2014

Meeting place
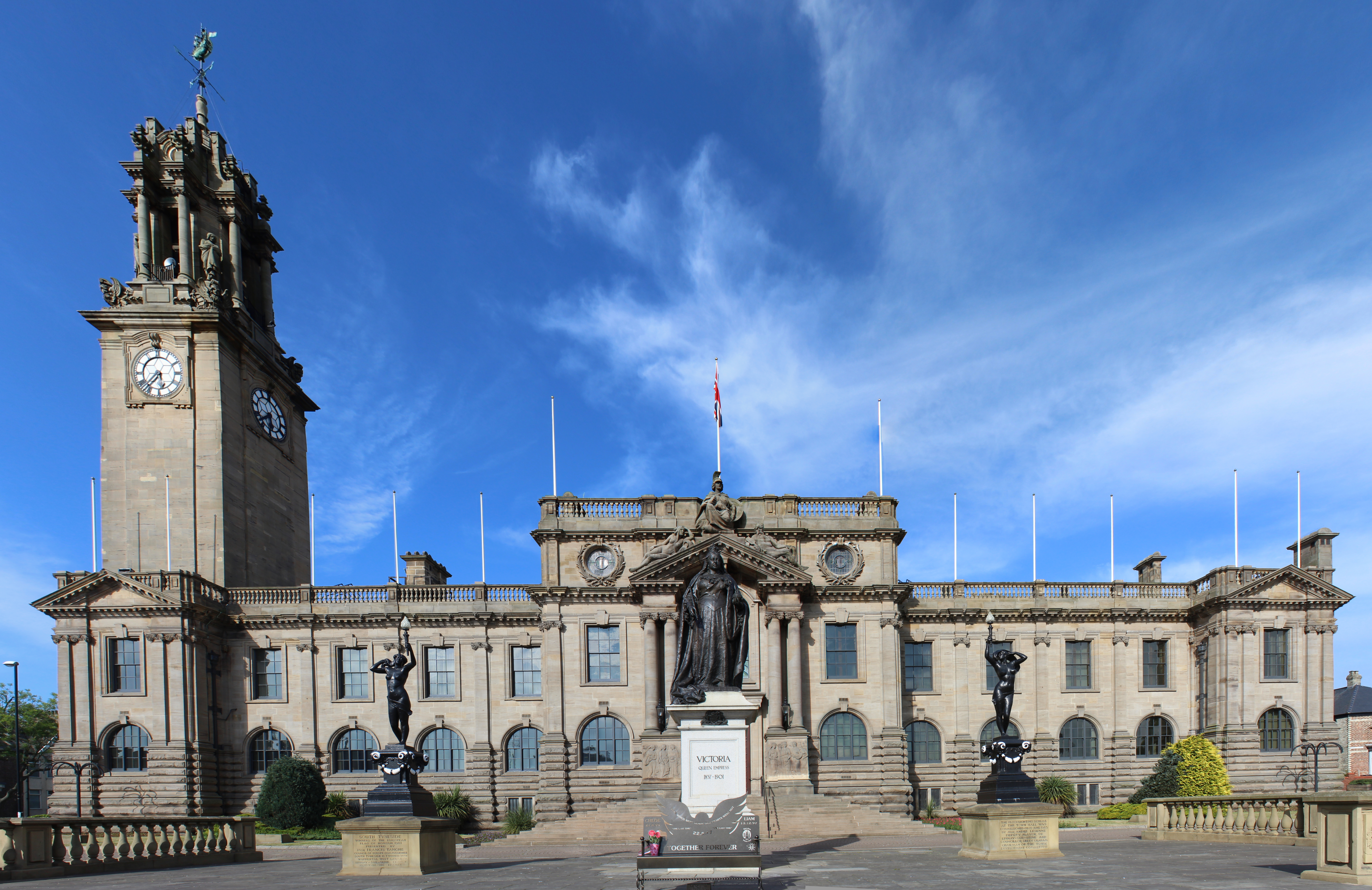
- South Tyneside Town Hall, South Shields

Website
- northeastca.gov.uk

The North East Combined Authority (NECA), officially the "Durham, Gateshead, South Tyneside and Sunderland Combined Authority", was a non-mayoral combined authority in North East England. From 2014 to 2024, it consisted of the Sunderland, Gateshead, South Tyneside, and County Durham local authorities. From 2014 to 2018, it also consisted of Newcastle upon Tyne, North Tyneside, and Northumberland local authorities.

NECA was established in 2014 by statutory instrument under the Local Democracy, Economic Development and Construction Act 2009. It had some powers over economic development and regeneration.

It was announced in October 2015 that NECA would receive an enhanced devolution settlement and elect a mayor in 2017. These plans were later cancelled by the Communities and Local Government Secretary Sajid Javid on 8 September 2016 after Durham, Gateshead, South Tyneside, and Sunderland Councils withdrew their support.

The councils supportive of a mayoral deal (Newcastle, North Tyneside, and Northumberland) withdrew from NECA as a result and formed the North of Tyne Combined Authority which would have a directly elected mayor. For transport policy, the members of both combined authorities continued with a North East Joint Transport Committee.

In May 2024, NECA and North of Tyne Combined Authority were both abolished and replaced with the larger North East Mayoral Combined Authority, effectively reverting to the geographic area of the pre-2018 NECA.

== History ==
In order to create a combined authority, the local authorities in the proposed area must undertake a governance review and produce a scheme of their proposals.

At the first meeting of NECA on 15 April 2014, Simon Henig, the Leader of Durham County Council, was elected as chair.

Upon formation, the functions, property, rights and liabilities of the former Tyne and Wear Integrated Transport Authority were inherited by NECA, forming an executive body within the new authority as the Tyne and Wear Passenger Transport Executive.

=== Naming ===
The order which established NECA referred to it as the Durham, Gateshead, Newcastle Upon Tyne, North Tyneside, Northumberland, South Tyneside and Sunderland Combined Authority, simply listing the names of the constituent councils in alphabetical order. The initial consultation used the name Durham, Northumberland and Tyne and Wear Combined Authority. The body uses the name NECA. The legal name of the authority was changed to Durham, Gateshead, South Tyneside and Sunderland Combined Authority in November 2018.

== Local government ==
Map of the local government authorities of North East England, highlighting the amended area covered by NECA from 2 November 2018.

NECA consisted of the following authorities (2024 population estimates):

Authority	Type	Population	Area (km^{2})	Pop. density (per km^{2})
Gateshead	Metropolitan borough	202,760	142	1,424
South Tyneside	Metropolitan borough	151,393	64	2,350
Sunderland	Metropolitan borough	288,606	137	2,100
Durham	Unitary authority	538,011	2,226	242
