= Northumbria Police =

English territorial police force

- Logo of Northumbria Police

Agency overview
- Formed: 1974; 52 years ago
- Legal personality: Police force

Jurisdictional structure
- Operations jurisdiction: Gateshead; Newcastle upon Tyne; North Tyneside; Northumberland; South Tyneside; Sunderland
- Map of Northumbria Police's jurisdiction
- Area: 2,141 square miles (5,550 km^{2})
- Population: 1.46 million
- Legal jurisdiction: England & Wales
- Constituting instrument: Police Act 1996
- General nature: Local civilian police

Operational structure
- Overseen by: His Majesty's Inspectorate of Constabulary and Fire & Rescue Services; Independent Office for Police Conduct
- Headquarters: Wallsend
- Police officers: 3,755 (including 98 special constables)
- Police staffs: 1,984 staff; 121 police community support officers
- Police and crime commissioner responsible: Susan Dungworth (Labour)
- Agency executive: Vanessa Jardine, chief constable

Website
- www.northumbria.police.uk

Northumbria Police is a territorial police force in England, responsible for policing the ceremonial counties of Northumberland and Tyne and Wear. It is the largest police force in the North East by geographical area and number of officers. The force covers an area of 2,141 square miles (5,550 km^{2}) with a population of 1.46 million.

== History ==
The force was formed in 1974 by merging the Northumberland Constabulary with part of the Durham Constabulary. The police forces for the county boroughs of South Shields, Gateshead, Sunderland, Newcastle upon Tyne and Tynemouth had already been amalgamated into their respective county forces in 1969, with the Berwick-upon-Tweed police having been merged into Northumberland County Constabulary in 1921.

=== Notable operations ===
Fugitive Raoul Moat was pursued by Northumbria Police in the 2010 Northumbria Police manhunt. Moat targeted Northumbria Police officers after his release from HM Prison Durham. A manhunt was initiated by Northumbria Police, calling upon mutual aid assistance from the armed response units of other police forces in support of Northumbria's armed officers. Neighbouring police forces offered support, as well as forces as far away as the Metropolitan Police, which deployed 40 firearms officers trained in the use of sniper rifles. The Police Service of Northern Ireland dispatched 20 specialist off-road armoured vehicles to help in the search on rough terrain in Northumberland. Since this operation, Northumbria Police has significantly increased its armed response capacity.

In January 2014, Northumbria Police launched Operation Sanctuary to investigate sexual abuse gangs targeting vulnerable young white girls. By June 2014, the operation had identified 80 victims and the total number of arrests had reached a 104.

=== Public controversies ===
In May 2016, details emerged of an affair between former Chief Constable Mike Craik and then Assistant Chief Constable Carolyn Peacock. Peacock's husband – also then a serving police officer – found out about the affair at a barbecue, and attacked Craik. Officers from Northumbria Police were called to the incident, which was later removed from all police logs on order of the chief constable, and legally banned from reporting in the courts. The legal bans were lifted, after the former head of legal sued the force for unfair dismissal.

In 2025 Mr Justice Linden ruled that Northumbria Police had not acted impartially by marching in uniform in support of transgender rights. He said: “The fact that the officers had publicly stated their support for transgender rights by taking part in the 2024 march would be likely to give the impression that they may not deal with the matter fairly and impartially.”

=== Proposed mergers ===
Under proposals made by the Home Secretary on 6 February 2006, Northumbria was to merge with Cleveland Police and Durham Constabulary to form a single strategic police force for North East England. Both Northumbria and Durham favoured this proposal, while Cleveland expressed a wish that it be merged with the southern area of the Durham force. All proposals regarding force mergers were subsequently dropped nationwide.

=== Funding cuts ===
Since 2010, Northumbria Police has suffered the most significant funding cuts of any UK police force due to the austerity, amounting to a 23% reduction in the force's budget. Former chief constable, Steve Ashman expressed fears Northumbria police could soon be unable to provide an adequate police service. Ashman said, "If the day of not being able to provide a professional service was here, I would say it is not here, but it is getting very, very close." Northumbria police received £259.6 million for the year 2017–18 which is up slightly from £259.5M in 2016–17. This small rise is insufficient to compensate for inflation currently at just under 3% per year. Northumbria police experienced a funding cut in real terms. Most Northumbrian police stations now close at 8.00 pm or earlier, and people needing the police after that time must use the telephone or an interactive service.

=== Chief constables ===
- 1943–1946: Sir Joseph Simpson
- 1969–1975: Clarence Harrington Cooksley
- 1975–1991: Sir Stanley Ernest Bailey
- 1991–1996: John Stevens
- 1998–2005: Crispian Strachan
- 2005–2010: Mike Craik
- 2010–2015: Sue Sim
- 2015–2017: Stephen Ashman
- 2017–2023: Winton Keenen
- 2023–present: Vanessa Jardine

=== Officers killed in the line of duty ===
The Police Roll of Honour Trust and Police Memorial Trust list and commemorate all British police officers killed in the line of duty. Since its establishment in 1984, the Police Memorial Trust has erected 50 memorials nationally to some of those officers.

Since 1900, the following officers of Northumbria Police and its predecessors are listed by the Trust as having been killed while attempting to prevent, stop or solve a criminal act:

- PC George Bertram Mussell, 1913 (shot)
- Sergeant Andrew Barton, 1913 (shot)
- PC George William Wheatley, 1957 (fell from roof while searching for a suspect)
- PC Brian Armstrong, 1966 (stabbed)
- PC Daniel Buckley, 1982 (fell through roof while pursuing a burglar)
- PC Bernard Leslie Bull, 1991 (collapsed and died during an arrest)
- Sergeant William Forth, 1993 (stabbed)
- PC Joseph Geoffrey Carroll, 2006 (the prisoner he was transporting caused the vehicle to crash, fatally injuring the officer)

On 6 November 2017, Constable John Davidson of the Abbotsford Police Department in British Columbia, Canada, was shot and killed while trying to arrest a suspect who had allegedly opened fire in the car park of a shopping centre. Davidson had served with the Northumbria Police from 1993 to 2005, before emigrating overseas to Canada to join the Abbotsford Police.

== Organisation ==
As of July 2025, the force has 3,794 police officers, 90 police community support officers and 2,191 police staff.

The force's headquarters are located in Wallsend, North Tyneside. However, significant numbers of functions have been dispersed to various locations throughout the force area as part of plans to reduce costs, with the stated intention of operating without a traditional headquarters function. As of February 2023, the chief constable is Vanessa Jardine.

In July 2025, the force announced plans to move the headquarters to Cobalt Business Park, which would also be the new home for the communications and command teams. The new strategy also included a new training facility in Washington and a new dog kennels. Further, these plans note that the future of Gateshead police station is under review.

As of 2025, the force uses a variety of vehicles, including but not limited to; Vauxhall Corsa, Peugeot 208, Vauxhall Vivaro, Volvo V90, Ford Ranger, Toyota Corolla, Volvo XC60, Peugeot 3008, Kia Rio, Vauxhall Combo, Ford Transit Custom, Vauxhall Astra, Mercedes Sprinter, VW Transporter, Vauxhall Movano, Ford Mondeo, Ford Focus, Kawasaki Ninja, VW Golf, Volvo XC90, Seat Leon, Ford Focus ST and Volvo V60.

=== Communication and control centres ===
Northumbria Police has two inter-operable communication centres:

- Northern Communication Centre (NCC) – deals with all stations and commands north of the Tyne, based at Ponteland, Northumberland.
- Southern Communication Centre (SCC) – deals with all stations and commands south of the Tyne, based at South Shields police station.

=== Area commands ===
As of March 2024, Northumbria Police operate six 'area commands', equivalent to Basic Command Units within other forces. They are aligned to the six local government areas which Northumbria Police serve:

- Northumberland
- North Tyneside
- Newcastle
- Gateshead
- South Tyneside
- Sunderland

=== Stations ===
Northumbria Police currently operate from

- Alnwick
- Ashington
- Bedlington
- Bellingham
- Berwick
- Blyth
- Byker
- Cramlington
- Eldon Square
- Etal Lane
- Farringdon
- Follingsby
- Forth Banks
- Gateshead
- Haltwhistle
- Hebburn
- Hexham
- Houghton
- Killingworth
- Metro Centre
- Middle Engine Lane
- Millbank
- Morpeth
- Newcastle Airport
- Newcastle West
- North Shields
- Ponteland
- Prudhoe
- Southwick
- Sunderland
- Washington
- Whickham
- Whitley Bay
- Wooler

== See also ==
- Northumbria Police and Crime Commissioner
- Law enforcement in the United Kingdom
- List of law enforcement agencies in the United Kingdom
