= Greater Essex Combined County Authority =

Planned strategic authority and combined county authority in England

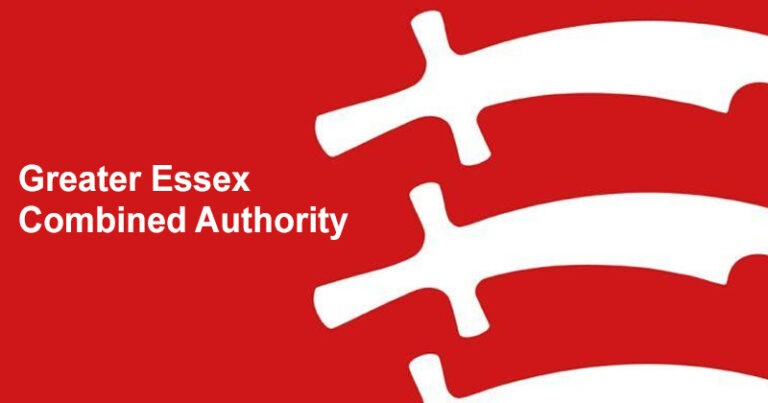
- Logo

- Area covered by the planned Greater Essex Combined County Authority

Type
- Type: Combined county authority of Essex

History
- Founded: 2026 (planned)

Leadership
- Mayor of Greater Essex: TBD (first election 2028)
- Chief Executive: Tom Walker (interim)

Elections
- Voting system: Indirect election; Directly elected mayor (from 2028)
- First election: 4 May 2028

The Greater Essex Combined County Authority (GECCA) is a planned strategic authority and combined county authority for the ceremonial county of Essex, England. GECCA is expected to be established in 2026. Its creation is linked to the English Devolution and Community Empowerment Act 2026, first outlined in a white paper in 2024 by the Starmer ministry. GECCA will have a directly elected mayor, with the first mayoral election expected in 2028.

== History ==
=== Background ===
From 1974, the entire county of Essex was administered by Essex County Council in a two-tier system with lower tier district councils. This system continues in most of the county today, but in 1998 the districts of Thurrock and Southend-on-Sea were granted unitary authority status, making them administratively independent from the county council. Essex Police and the Essex County Fire and Rescue Service continued to cover the entire county after 1998. In 2012, the elected county-wide position of Essex Police and Crime Commissioner was introduced, with the role also becoming the fire authority and being re-named Police, Fire and Crime Commissioner in 2018. (Note: The office of Essex Police and Crime Commissioner was introduced in 2012. In 2017, the office was granted responsibility for the fire service and renamed Essex Police, Fire and Crime Commissioner.) The three upper-tier authorities of Essex have also continued to work together on different issues since 1998.

Since 1999, the UK Government has devolved powers to local parliaments, assemblies, authorities and mayors in the nations and regions of the UK. In 2009, it introduced combined authorities and combined county authorities which can be formed by volunteering groups of local authorities in England, to which the government can devolve powers. In 2023, the similar combined county authority was also introduced. Both authorities can be led by directly elected mayors supported by council appointees, or can be led by a body indirectly appointed by their member authorities.

=== Early proposals ===
After the 2014 Scottish independence referendum, the coalition government of David Cameron pledged to devolve powers to city regions in England by negotiating devolution deals with local councils to form combined authorities. In September 2014, Essex County Council leader David Finch called on the government to explore establishing combined authorities for counties like Essex, with the devolution of tax raising powers, funding for social services and other policy areas. In November 2014, Finch and the leaders of the district councils in the county council area co-wrote a letter to the government which asked it to begin negotiations with council leaders across Essex to agree an Essex devolution deal, arguing that devolution would bring economic growth and other benefits to the county.

Negotiations for an Essex devolution deal, or a Greater Essex devolution deal as it also became known, (Note: Essex is the name of both the non-metropolitan county administered by Essex County Council and the ceremonial county which also includes the two independent unitary authority areas of Thurrock and Southend-on-Sea. To distinguish between the two, the term Greater Essex is used for the larger ceremonial county in an administrative context.) began in December 2014, with Essex County Council, Thurrock Council and Southend-on-Sea Borough Council discussing the formation of a Greater Essex Combined Authority (GECA) with the government. Finch envisioned the combined authority being led by a county governor, who would have a role similar to the elected metro mayors of devolved city regions such as Greater London and Greater Manchester, though he was also willing to accept other arrangements if preferred by the government. All fifteen upper tier and lower tier councils in Essex registered their interest in the Greater Essex Combined Authority, though Colchester Borough Council, Thurrock Council and Southend-on-Sea Borough Council were reluctant to fully commit to the proposal because of financial concerns.

In January 2015, Thurrock Council and Southend-on-Sea Borough Council put forward a proposal of their own to create a South Essex Combined Authority or Essex Thameside Combined Authority, which would run along the northern bank of the River Thames and include Thurrock and Southend and the district councils of Basildon, Rochford and Castle Point in the county council area, which would form a land bridge between the two unitary councils. Thurrock and Southend argued that these southern parts of Essex, which are mainly urban, constituted a distinct economic zone with few links to the mainly rural central and northern parts of the county. Thurrock Council leader John Kent and Southend-on-Sea Borough Council leader Ron Woodley claimed that their proposal was supported by local businesses, while the district councils considered separating from the rest of Essex because of Essex County Council's policy of turning off the majority of street lights at night, which they opposed. Kent and Woodley continued to work with Essex County Council on the Greater Essex proposal despite their public preference for South Essex, as they believed they could negotiate benefits for the south of the county in a Greater Essex devolution deal.

Work on both proposals continued into 2016. In March of that year, Kent and Woodley announced that their councils were withdrawing their support for the Greater Essex Combined Authority, again stating their belief that South Essex was a distinct economic zone from the rest of the county, while also voicing new concerns that the Greater Essex deal would give their areas a lack of autonomy, which they warned would stifle economic growth. The leaders also said they had been unable to secure benefits for the south of Essex in their discussions with the county council. In response, Finch said the county council could explore an Essex devolution deal without Thurrock and Southend.

After the local elections in May 2016, Conservative minority administrations took power in Southend and Thurrock. In Southend, the new Conservative leader John Lamb expressed his support for negotiating a county-wide devolution deal with the government. However, Thurrock Council's new leader Rob Gledhill continued his predecessor's policy of opposing a "pan-Essex" devolution deal, as he believed a South Essex deal could be more beneficial for the region. In June 2016, the fifteen councils leaders of Essex met to vote on a devolution settlement offered by the government, which would include a county-wide mayoral devolution deal for Essex. The deal was narrowly voted down by eight to seven votes, after Gledhill voted against the offer because he believed that this was in the best interests of southern Essex. The Conservative government of David Cameron refused to support a devolution deal which did not include the entire county, and the devolution negotiations were abandoned.

After the collapse of the negotiations, Essex County Council and the southern district councils of Castle Point, Rochford, Basildon and also Brentwood, which was not part of the proposed South Essex Combined Authority, agreed to form the Association of South Essex Local Authorities (ASELA) with Southend and Thurrock. However, the councils agreed not to pursue any devolution deals so they could instead focus on cooperating in the existing framework of local government to encourage economic growth.

=== Revival of talks in 2019 ===
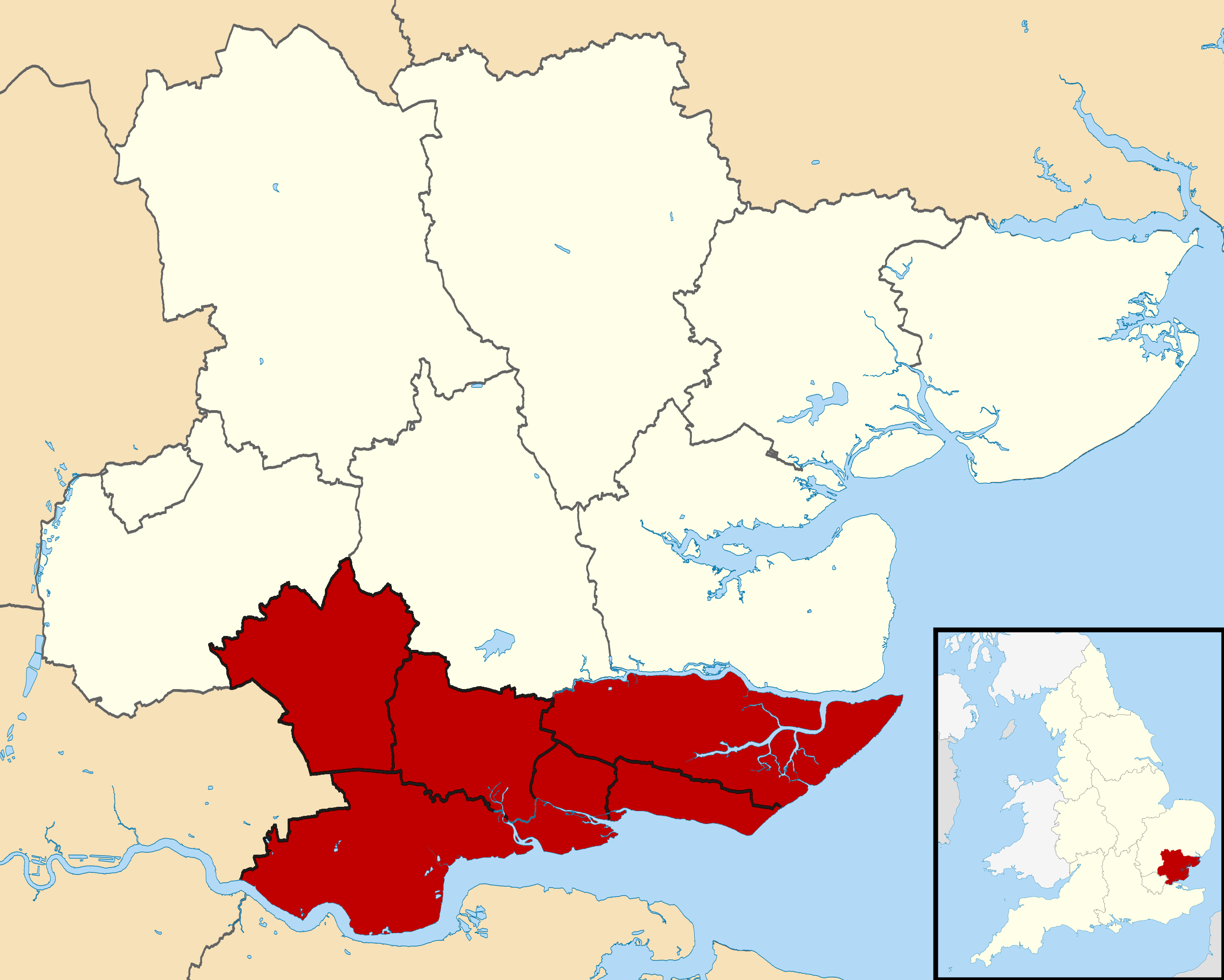
Map of Essex with the area covered by the South Essex Combined Authority in red, as proposed by Basildon Council leader Gavin Callaghan in 2019

Negotiations for devolution in Essex were revived in 2019, after Basildon Council's leader Gavin Callaghan started campaigning for the establishment of a South Essex Combined Authority, with Brentwood Borough Council now also included in the revived proposal. Callaghan said there was an "appetite" for a combined authority from southern council leaders and argued that more powers were needed for the region to address economic inequality and improve social mobility. The revived proposal was supported by the other members of ASELA with the exception of Essex County Council, which decided to once again push for a Greater Essex devolution deal.

ASELA commissioned a South Essex governance review by the independent consultant Shared Intelligence, which reported its findings in June 2020. The report recommended the creation of a South Essex Combined Authority with a directly elected mayor who would serve for a term of four years, as it would be the "most appropriate governance arrangement" for ASELA to achieve its agreed economic goals, with an elected mayoral authority improving economic and strategic policy planning, giving the area a local identity and stabilising and improving its local governance.

In July 2020, the district and unitary members of ASELA agreed to a prospectus for the South Essex Combined Authority which they then submitted to the government for consideration. ASELA chair Rob Gledhill, who was also the leader of Thurrock Council at the time, said the combined authority would enable greater government investment into the region. He said the prospectus had outlined an aim for the proposed combined authority to "contribute an additional £15 billion to the UK economy and create 100,000 new jobs by 2050", with Thurrock Council working with the councils of Basildon, Brentwood, Castle Point, Rochford and Southend to prove to the government in negotiations that "South Essex works and that it works for the whole nation". The government said it was reluctant to support a mayoral combined authority for South Essex alone, as it did not believe it was clear that the region had the "right geography" for this, but did say it was open to negotiating the proposal further with the councils involved. Essex County Council also maintained its opposition to the proposal.

Devolution negotiations did not resume until late 2021, as they were put on hold because of the COVID-19 pandemic.

=== Formation ===
The devolution deal was agreed in October 2025. An interim chief executive was appointed in December 2025. Also in December, the first election of the mayor was delayed until 2028 and after the reorganisation of the constituent authorities is proposed to have been completed.

== Membership ==
=== Constituent local authorities ===
The constituent members will be:

- Essex County Council
- Southend-on-Sea City Council
- Thurrock Council

=== Board members ===
The inaugural combined county authority board will consist of representatives from the initial constituent authorities. The seven constituent board members will nominate a chair from amongst themselves until the first mayor is elected in May 2028.

Name	Membership	Nominating authority
Vacant until May 2028	Mayor of Greater Essex, constituent	Direct election
TBD	Constituent	Essex County Council
TBD	Constituent	Essex County Council
TBD	Constituent	Essex County Council
TBD	Constituent	Southend-on-Sea City Council
TBD	Constituent	Southend-on-Sea City Council
TBD	Constituent	Thurrock Council
TBD	Constituent	Thurrock Council

== Powers and functions ==
The combined authority would have powers over housing, regeneration, local growth, adult skills and local transport. The mayor will be a member of the Mayoral Council for England and the Council of the Nations and Regions.
