= Kim McGuinness =

British politician (born 1985)

Mayor Kim McGuinness
- McGuinness in 2026

Mayor of the North East
- Incumbent
- Assumed office 7 May 2024
- Deputy: Martin Gannon 2024-2026; Karen Clark 2026-
- Preceded by: Jamie Driscoll (as Mayor of the North of Tyne); Tracey Dixon (as Chair of the North East Combined Authority)

Police and Crime Commissioner for Northumbria
- In office 19 July 2019 – 8 May 2024
- Preceded by: Vera Baird
- Succeeded by: Susan Dungworth

Member of Newcastle City Council for Lemington
- In office 7 May 2015 – September 2019
- Succeeded by: Jason Smith

Personal details
- Born: Cara Kim McGuinness; 29 May 1985 (age 41) Newcastle upon Tyne, England
- Party: Labour Co-op
- Education: Newcastle University (BA)
- Website: Official website

Kim McGuinness (born 29 May 1985) is a British Labour Co-op politician who was elected as the strategic authority mayor for the North East in May 2024. Previously, she served as the Northumbria Police and Crime Commissioner between 2019 and 2024.

== Early life ==
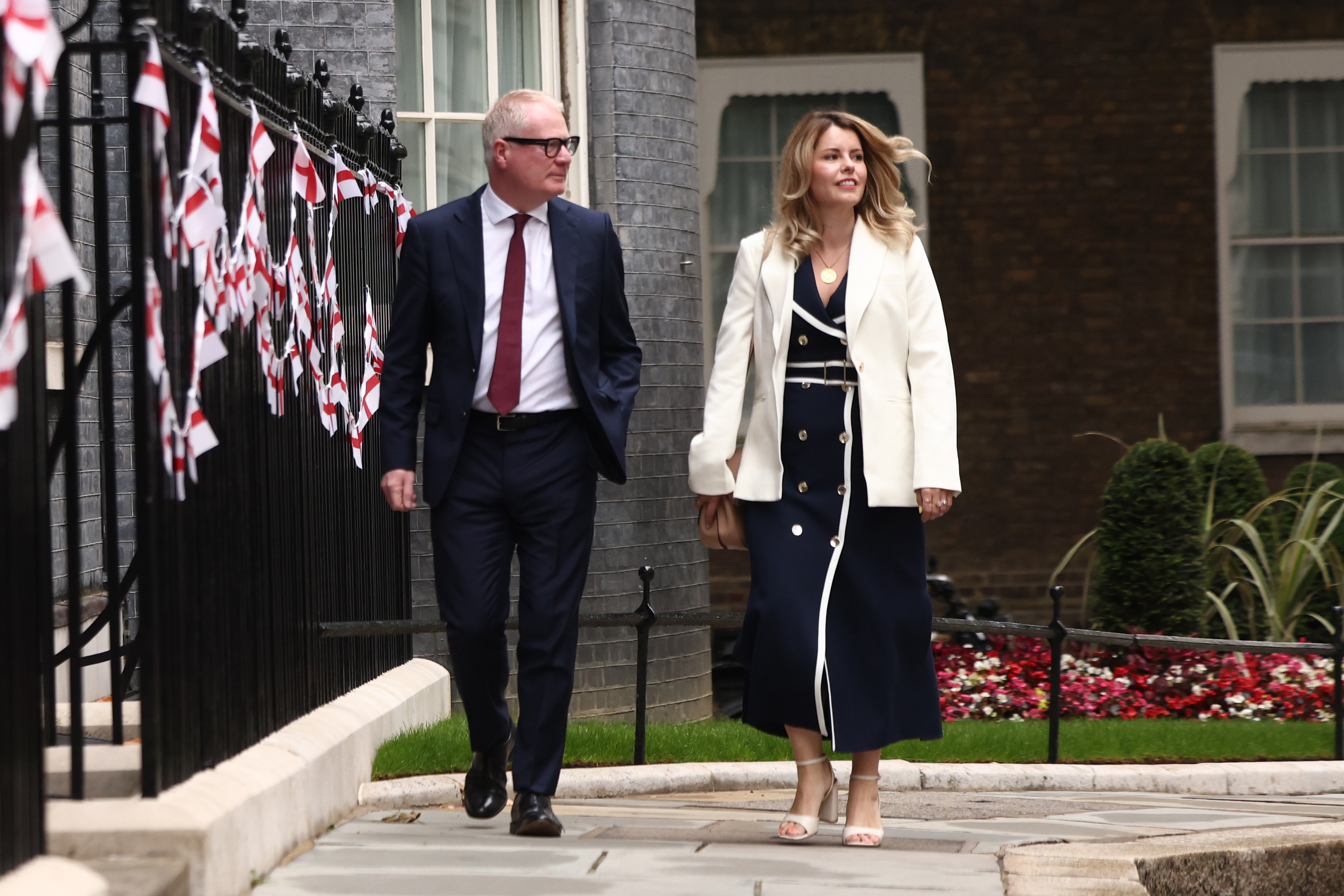
McGuinness, with Richard Parker, visiting Downing Street in July 2024

McGuinness was born in the West End of Newcastle upon Tyne. She grew up in a council house, her father was a scaffolder and her mother worked as a secretary at an insurance broker. She attended Cheviot First School and Gosforth High School. McGuinness was the first in her family to attend university and graduated from Newcastle University in 2006 where she studied history. Prior to entering politics McGuinness worked professionally in a number of sectors including finance, universities and charities.

== Career ==
McGuinness was elected to represent the Lemington ward on Newcastle City Council in 2015, before joining the authority's cabinet in 2016 as executive member for culture, sport and public health.

McGuinness became the Northumbria Police and Crime Commissioner in a by-election on 18 July 2019, succeeding Dame Vera Baird and the acting commissioner, Ruth Durham, following Baird leaving the role to become Victims' Commissioner. She retained the role following an election on 6 May 2021.

McGuinness was selected as the Labour candidate for the new position of North East Mayor in July 2023. The election took place on 2 May 2024.

In July 2023, an allegedly racist tweet came to light that McGuinness had posted in 2011. The tweet stated "f*** off! I am not a gypsy!" In February 2024 a complaint was made by The Traveller Movement to Keir Starmer, and McGuinness apologised for the remark.

In May 2024 McGuinness was elected by Councillor Martin Gannon as the first North East Mayor. She won 41.3% of the vote.

McGuinness became the first chair of the newly formed The Great North Partnership in May 2025.

== Personal life ==
McGuinness lives in Northumberland with her husband David Prutton, a serving Royal Air Force officer.
