= North East Joint Transport Committee =

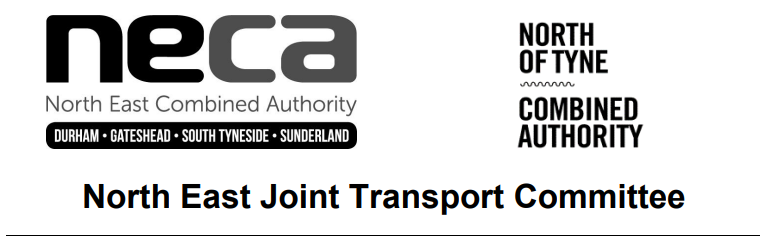

- North East Joint Transport Committee area within England

Type
- Type: Special joint committee

History
- Founded: 20 November 2018
- Disbanded: 7 May 2024

Meeting place
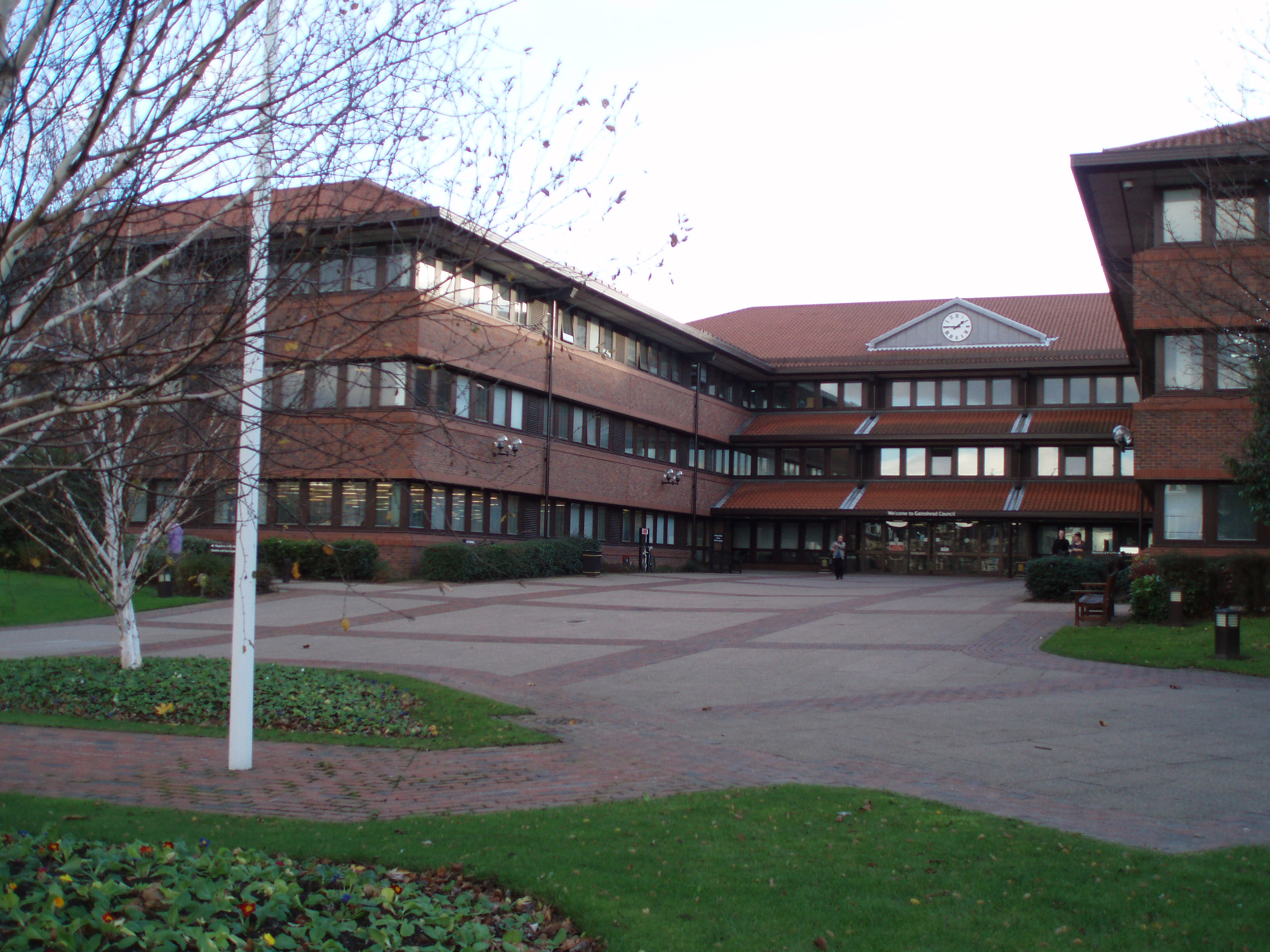
- Gateshead Civic Centre, Gateshead

Website
- https://www.northeast-ca.gov.uk/governance/documents-archive

The North East Joint Transport Committee was a special joint committee of the North East Combined Authority and the North of Tyne Combined Authority. It was responsible for public transport policy in Tyne and Wear, County Durham and Northumberland in England. It was the governing body of Nexus, the trading name of the Tyne and Wear Passenger Transport Executive. The inaugural meeting was held on 20 November 2018.

It was a statutory committee, created by part 3 of the Newcastle upon Tyne, North Tyneside and Northumberland Combined Authority (Establishment and Functions) Order 2018. The committee held the transport powers that would ordinarily be the responsibility of a combined authority or integrated transport authority. Some functions were devolved to Durham County Council and Northumberland County Council and there was a sub-committee for transport policy in Tyne and Wear.

The committee had seven members, with four from the North East Combined Authority and three from the North of Tyne Combined Authority. It was hosted by and accountable to the North East Combined Authority who "hold, manage and account for the finances and staff deployed in relation to the discharge of transport functions".

The North East Joint Transport Committee was abolished on 7 May 2024 when its functions were assumed by the North East Mayoral Combined Authority, which was formed as a merger of both the North East Combined Authority and the North of Tyne Combined Authority.
