= Martin Gannon =

Martin Gannon is a long serving Labour politician and former council leader of Gateshead Council from May 2016 until May 2026.

== Career ==
Gannon was first elected to Gateshead Council in 1984. During his time on the council, he held a number of senior positions, including serving as Deputy Leader for six years. In May 2016, Gannon was elected Leader of Gateshead Council, a position he held for a decade.

Before entering senior local government leadership, Gannon worked for the GMB trade union for 23 years. During this time, Gannon undertook a range of roles, including Regional Officer, Head of Research, and responsibilities covering health and safety and media and communications. Gannon's trade-union background has been an important part of his career and has influenced his focus on employment, public services and economic development.

As Leader of Gateshead Council, Gannon became increasingly involved in regional and national organisations. Gannon developed a particular interest in transport and regional economic development, representing Gateshead in wider North East structures. Gannon chaired regional transport bodies and served on boards concerned with economic development, local government and education.

In 2024, following the creation of the new North East Combined Authority, Gannon was appointed Deputy Mayor to North East Mayor Kim McGuinness. He was also given responsibility for the transport portfolio, reflecting his longstanding involvement in transport policy across the region. In this role, Gannon has been involved in ambitions to improve public transport, encourage greener travel and strengthen connections between communities across the North East.Gannon has also held positions outside the council. He served as a Non-Executive Director of Gateshead Health NHS Foundation Trust and has been involved with education and regional institutions.

Gannon entered Gateshead politics in 1984 and has spent much of his working life involved in public service and local government. His career has combined local representation with wider regional responsibilities, particularly in relation to transport, economic development, public services and the interests of communities in the North East.
