= North of Tyne Combined Authority =

Former combined authority in north east England

North of Tyne Combined Authority Newcastle upon Tyne, North Tyneside and Northumberland Combined Authority

- North of Tyne Combined Authority within England

Type
- Type: Combined Authority

History
- Founded: 2 November 2018
- Disbanded: 7 May 2024
- Succeeded by: North East Mayoral Combined Authority

Leadership
- Mayor: Jamie Driscoll, Independent (Note: When elected as Mayor in May 2019, Driscoll represented the Labour and Co-operative Party. He left the Labour Party in June 2023 and remained in post as an independent.)

Structure
- Joint committees: North East Joint Transport Committee

Elections
- Voting system: First past the post
- Last election: 2 May 2019

Meeting place
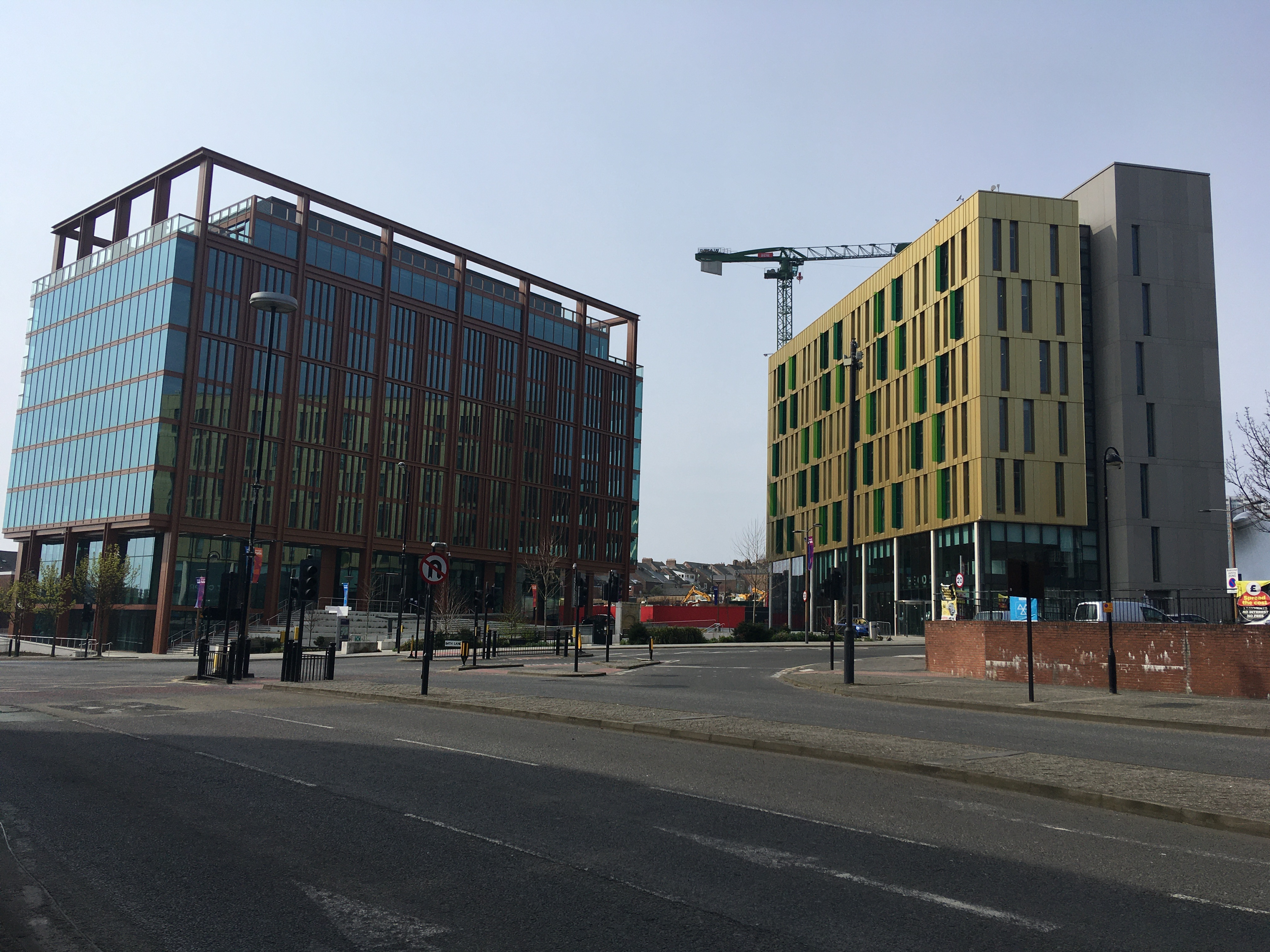
- The Lumen, Newcastle Helix, St James Boulevard, Newcastle upon Tyne

Website
- www.northoftyne-ca.gov.uk

The North of Tyne Combined Authority was a mayoral combined authority which consisted of the local authorities of Newcastle upon Tyne, North Tyneside, and Northumberland, all in North East England. The authority came into being on 2 November 2018 under the statutory name "Newcastle upon Tyne, North Tyneside and Northumberland Combined Authority". The three constituent local authorities previously formed part of the North East Combined Authority (2014–2024), which continued to exist, albeit covering a smaller area, south of the River Tyne. The two combined authorities co-operated on the North East Joint Transport Committee.

The authority met for the first time on 8 November 2018 at Morpeth Town Hall. Norma Redfearn, the elected mayor of North Tyneside Council, was appointed the chair until an interim mayor was appointed. At the combined authority cabinet meeting held on 4 December 2018, Norma Redfearn was confirmed as the interim mayor, and remained in post until the election of Labour and Co-operative's Jamie Driscoll as the authority's first directly elected mayor.

In its levelling up white paper, published in February 2022, the UK government announced its intention to replace both North of Tyne combined authority and North East Combined Authority (2014–2024) with a single North East Mayoral Combined Authority. This was created in 2024. North of Tyne Combined Authority ceased to exist in May 2024.

== History ==
The authority was formed on 2 November 2018 and in May 2019, elections were held for a directly elected regional mayor who took control of certain powers and funding devolved from Westminster to the newly formed region. A fund of £600 million over 30 years, to be administered by the new mayor, was announced in the November 2017 budget.

The responsibilities and governance of the three constituent local authorities remained unchanged.

The total population of the combined authority area was approximately 867,000 (Note: Newcastle upon Tyne, 320,605; North Tyneside, 215,025; Northumberland, 331,420.) and it covered an area of 2,014 square miles (5,215 km^{2}). (Note: Newcastle upon Tyne, 113 km^{2} (44 sq mi); North Tyneside, 82 km^{2} (32 sq mi); Northumberland, 5,020 km^{2} (1,940 sq mi).) Despite the name "North of Tyne", parts of the authority area were south of the River Tyne, including the towns of Hexham and Prudhoe.

On 27 April 2018, Northumberland County Council, North Tyneside Council, and Newcastle City Council voted to support the establishment of the new combined authority. In November 2018, parliament approved the proposal and the first election for the combined authority's mayor took place on 2 May 2019 along with the other elections across the United Kingdom.

Following the publication of the Levelling Up White Paper in February 2022, it was proposed that the Combined Authority would be enlarged, with Gateshead, South Tyneside and Sunderland joining. County Durham was pursuing an independent devolution plan at that time. The enlargement did eventually come with an expansion of powers, including those for transport, and incorporating the Northumbria Police and Crime Commissioner role into the mayor's responsibilities. The final election took place during the May 2024 United Kingdom local elections.

== Membership ==
Formal membership of the North of Tyne Combined Authority consisted of those serving on the following statutory committees:

- Cabinet
- Overview and Scrutiny Committee
- Audit and Standards Committee

=== Local Government ===
Map of the local government authorities of North East England, highlighting the area covered by the North of Tyne Combined Authority.

North of Tyne Combined Authority consisted of the following authorities (2025 population estimates):

Authority	Type	Population	Area (km²)	Pop. Density (per km²)
Northumberland	Unitary authority	333,975	5,020	67
Newcastle upon Tyne	Metropolitan borough	320,838	113	2,828
North Tyneside	Metropolitan borough	215,401	82	2,617

=== Mayor ===
Name	Picture	Term of office		Elected	Political party
Norma Redfearn; Interim Mayor		4 December 2018	2 May 2019	—	Labour
Jamie Driscoll		6 May 2019	6 May 2024	2019	Labour Co-op (2019–2023); Independent (2023–2024)
