= Norfolk and Suffolk Combined County Authority =

Planned strategic authority and combined county authority in England

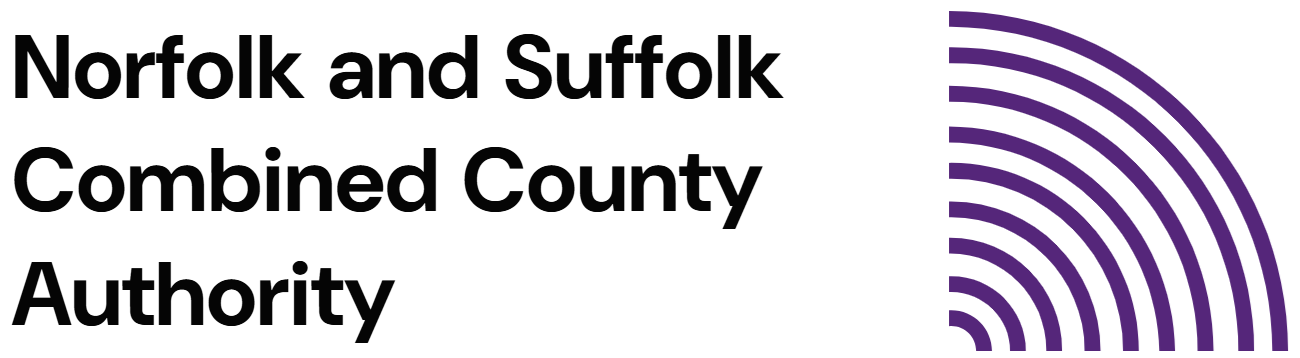
- Logo

Type
- Type: Combined county authority

History
- Founded: 2026 (planned)

Leadership
- Mayor of Norfolk and Suffolk: TBD (first election 2028)

Website
- www.norfolksuffolk-cca.gov.uk

The Norfolk and Suffolk Combined County Authority is a planned strategic authority and combined county authority for the ceremonial counties of Norfolk and Suffolk in eastern England. The authority is expected to be established in 2026. Its creation is linked to the English Devolution and Community Empowerment Act 2026, first outlined in a white paper in 2024 by the Starmer ministry. The authority will have a directly elected mayor who will be a member of the Mayoral Council for England and the Council of the Nations and Regions. The first mayoral election is expected to be held in May 2028.

== Membership ==
=== Constituent local authorities ===
Initial constituent membership:

- Norfolk County Council
- Suffolk County Council

Expected constituent membership from April 2028:

- Central and Eastern Suffolk Council
- East Norfolk Council
- Greater Norwich City Council
- Ipswich and South Suffolk Council
- West Norfolk Council
- Western Suffolk Council

=== Board members ===
The inaugural combined county authority board will consist of representatives from the initial constituent authorities. The constituent board members will nominate a chair from amongst themselves until the first mayor is elected in May 2028.

== See also ==
- Devolution in the United Kingdom § England
- East Anglia
