= Mayor of the North East =

Elected mayor in England

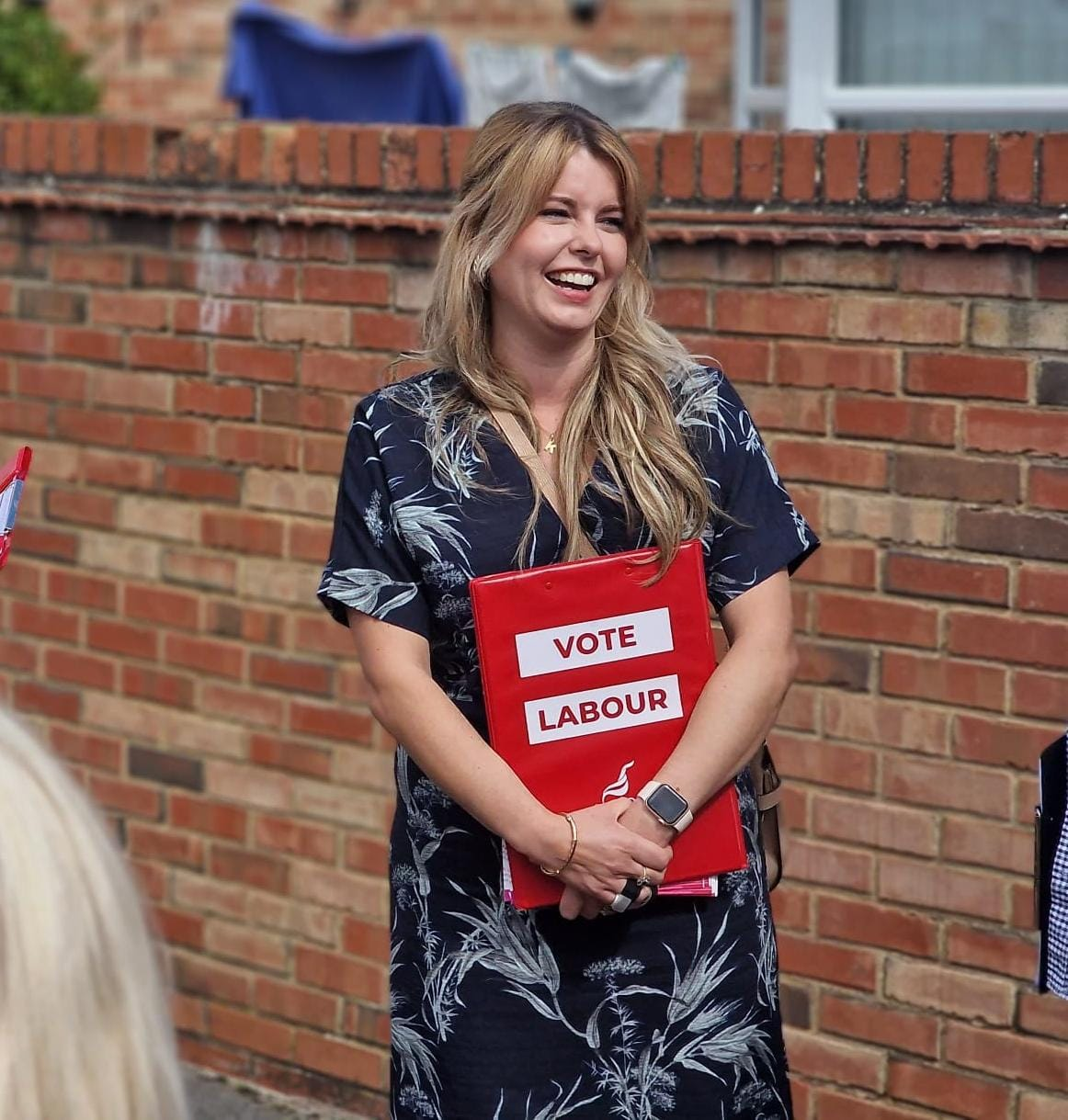
- Incumbent; Kim McGuinness since 7 May 2024
- Style: Mayor
- Appointer: Electorate of the North East Mayoral Combined Authority
- Term length: Four years
- Inaugural holder: Kim McGuinness
- Formation: 7 May 2024
- Deputy: Karen Clark
- Website: https://www.northeast-ca.gov.uk/about/the-mayor

The mayor of the North East is the strategic authority mayor for the North East Mayoral Combined Authority. The current mayor is Kim McGuinness, elected in May 2024. The deputy mayor is currently Karen Clark.

== Mayoral functions ==
The functions devolved to the mayor are:

- housing and regeneration
- education, skills and training
- the adult education budget
- the functional power of competence
- housing and planning, including mayoral development areas and corporations, land and acquisition powers
- finance, through council precepts and business rate supplements
- transport, including bus grants and franchising powers

The mayor is a member of the Mayoral Council for England and the Council of the Nations and Regions.

== List of mayors ==
Mayors of the North East
Name	Portrait	Term of office		Elected	Political party	Previous and concurrent occupations
Kim McGuinness		7 May 2024	Incumbent	2024	Labour	Police and Crime Commissioner for Northumbria 2019 to 2024
