= Susan Dungworth =

British politician

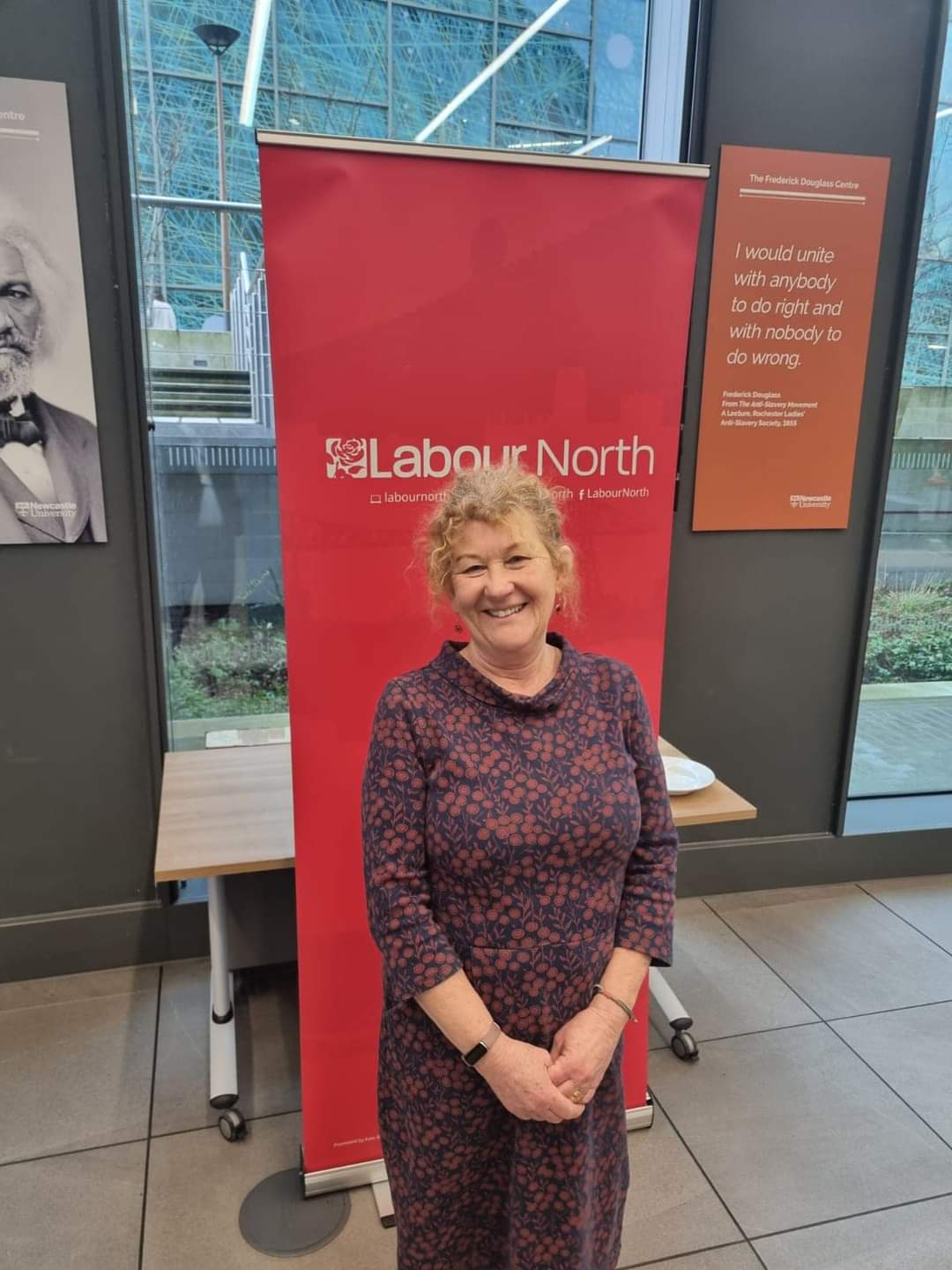
- Dungworth attending the Labour North regional conference in 2024

Police and Crime Commissioner for Northumbria
- Incumbent
- Assumed office 8 May 2024
- Deputy: Clare Penny-Evans
- Preceded by: Kim McGuinness

Leader of the Northumberland Labour Group Leader of the Opposition on Northumberland County Council
- In office 19 April 2019 – 6 May 2021
- Deputy: Scott Dickinson
- Preceded by: Grant Davey
- Succeeded by: Scott Dickinson

Member of Northumberland County Council for Hartley
- In office 4 May 2017 – 6 May 2021
- Preceded by: Anita Romer
- Succeeded by: David Ferguson

Chair of Seaton Valley Community Council for Hartley
- In office May 2021 – May 2024
- Preceded by: Stephen Stanners
- Succeeded by: Sue Bowman

Personal details
- Born: Susan Elizabeth Dungworth Manchester England
- Party: Labour and Co-operative
- Website: https://northumbria-pcc.gov.uk/

Susan Dungworth is a British Labour Party politician who has been the Northumbria Police and Crime Commissioner since May 2024, when she succeeded Kim McGuinness. She was a councillor until 2021, when she lost her seat.

== Early life ==
Dungworth is a former youth justice worker and community activist.

== Political career ==
In the 2019 United Kingdom general election, Dungworth was the Labour candidate in Blyth Valley. She was defeated by Conservative candidate Ian Levy.

She was previously Leader of the Northumberland Labour Group but in 2021 she lost her seat in Hartley, with the outcome of the vote decided by a rare ballot box draw after she tied with Tory candidate David Ferguson after they both received 868 votes each.

In November 2024, Susan Dungworth announced the creation of a digital resource to help combat the influence of misogyny (via, for example, manosphere culture, hate speech and rape culture) on young people. This is a continuation of a programme initiated by her predecessor as Police and Crime Commissioner, Kim McGuinness, in collaboration with Rape Crisis Tyneside and Northumberland.
