= North East Mayoral Strategic Authority =

Strategic authority and combined authority in England

Type
- Type: Combined authority & Strategic authority

History
- Founded: 7 May 2024
- Preceded by: North East Combined Authority (2014–2024) & North of Tyne Combined Authority

Leadership
- Mayor: Kim McGuinness, Labour and Co-op since May 2024
- Deputy mayor: Karen Clark since June 2026

Structure
- Graph of the party split among 8 seats.
- Political groups: Reform UK (4) Labour (2) Liberal Democrats (1) Conservatives (1)
- Committees: Audit and Standards Committee, Overview and Scrutiny Committee
- Length of term: None, 4 years (mayor)

Elections
- Voting system: First past the post
- Last election: 2 May 2024
- Next election: 4 May 2028

Meeting place
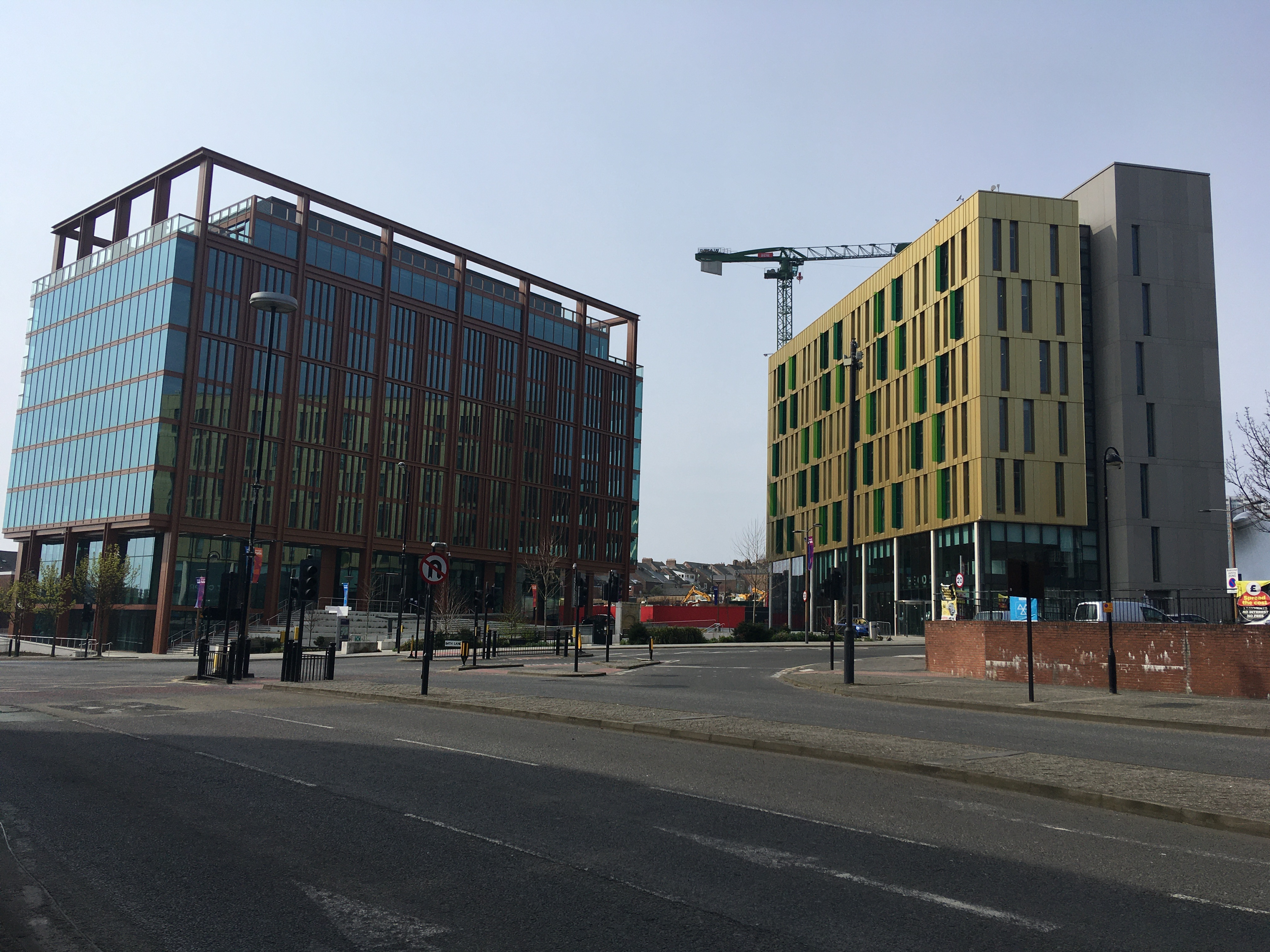
- The Lumen, St James Boulevard, Newcastle upon Tyne

Website
- www.northeast-ca.gov.uk

Constitution
- https://www.northeast-ca.gov.uk/governance/constitution

North East Mayoral Strategic Authority (NEMSA), previously known as North East Mayoral Combined Authority (NEMCA), is a strategic authority and combined authority in North East England. It is led by the directly elected Mayor of the North East and has seven member local authorities: County Durham, Northumberland, Gateshead, Newcastle, North Tyneside, South Tyneside and Sunderland. NEMSA's area and the Tees Valley Combined Authority area occupy the wider region of North East England.

NEMCA was announced on 28 December 2022 in the "North East devolution deal". On 6 March 2024, the government announced the "North East deeper devolution deal", which allowed NEMCA to absorb multiple previous devolved bodies and gave it increased devolved powers. The first election for the authority took place on 2 May 2024. The replacement of both the North East Combined Authority (2014–2024) and the North of Tyne Combined Authority with NEMCA happened on 7 May 2024. NEMCA was operational by the end of May 2024.

The authority was renamed from 'NEMCA' to 'NEMSA' on 18 May 2026.

== History ==
The Tyne and Wear County Council was abolished in 1986 alongside other metropolitan county governments. In 2004, a referendum (the 2004 North East England devolution referendum) was held in the North East region to establish a devolved assembly, which was rejected by voters.

The North East Combined Authority (2014–2024) was established in April 2014, including seven councils: Durham, Sunderland, Gateshead, South Tyneside, North Tyneside, Newcastle and Northumberland. A devolution deal was agreed, including the creation of a mayor to be elected in 2017. In September 2016, that deal broke down, as the leaders south of the Tyne were worried about the loss of EU funding, and in 2017 no mayor was elected.

From 2 November 2018, the boundaries of the original North East Combined Authority were reduced to Durham, Sunderland, Gateshead and South Tyneside. The remaining areas left to form a mayoral combined authority called the North of Tyne Combined Authority. The division of the Tyneside built up area into two combined authorities was criticised.

In the levelling up white paper, the Government announced a larger mayoral combined authority would be created for the region. Durham was to negotiate a separate county deal. On 28 December 2022, levelling up secretary Michael Gove announced a £1.4 billion devolution deal. The deal included the establishment of a unified mayoral combined authority, with a mayor to be elected in 2024. Martin Gannon, leader of Gateshead Council, said local councils were being forced into the deal and that it did not represent levelling up; he said he agreed with its introduction nevertheless. The seven local councils approved the final plans for the NEMCA on 9 November 2023, subject to approval by the chief executives of the councils, to allow for the secretary of state to make the order for the NEMCA to be established.

The North East Mayoral Combined Authority (Establishment and Functions) Order 2024 was laid before Parliament on 8 February 2024

On 6 March 2024, the Government announced the "North East deeper devolution deal", which supersedes the previous devolution deal and gave NEMCA increased devolved powers. The deeper devolution deal was signed on 18 March 2024. The deal includes provisions to establish a new North East Strategic Energy Board to coordinate energy supply and demand and promote growth in the offshore wind sector and a new North East Coastal and Rural Taskforce to strengthen the region's rural and coastal communities. and was made as a statutory instrument on 20 March 2024. The order dissolved two combined authorities to create NEMCA, prescribed the regeneration powers which the new combined authority holds and set out the functions which the elected mayor will control.

== Geography ==
Constituent councils of the North East Mayoral Strategic Authority
Ceremonial county	District	Council
County Durham	County Durham	Durham County Council
Northumberland	Northumberland	Northumberland County Council
Tyne and Wear	Gateshead	Gateshead Council
Tyne and Wear	City of Newcastle	Newcastle City Council
Tyne and Wear	North Tyneside	North Tyneside Council
Tyne and Wear	South Tyneside	South Tyneside Council
Tyne and Wear	City of Sunderland	Sunderland City Council

Population of the North East Combined Authority by district (2024)
District	Land area		Population		Density (/km^{2})
District	(km^{2})	(%)	People	(%)	Density (/km^{2})
County Durham	2,226	29%	538,011	26%	242
Gateshead	142	2%	202,760	10%	1,424
Newcastle upon Tyne	113	1%	320,605	16%	2,826
North Tyneside	82	1%	215,025	11%	2,613
Northumberland	5,020	64%	331,420	16%	66
South Tyneside	64	1%	151,393	7%	2,350
Sunderland	137	2%	288,606	14%	2,100
North East Combined Authority	7,786	100%	2,047,820	100%	263

== Constitution ==
The arrangements for NEMCA's governance were set out in the "North East Mayoral Combined Authority (Establishment and Functions) Order 2024".

The NEMSA cabinet has eight voting members and two non-voting members:

- Voting (8):
  - The mayor (1)
  - A member for each constituent council (7)
- Non-Voting (2):
  - The chair of the Business Board (1)
  - A representative of the community and voluntary sector (1)

The mayor provides leadership to NEMSA and chairs NEMSA meetings. A deputy mayor was appointed from among the voting members of the authority and the mayor may delegate mayoral functions to authority members. When NEMSA first meets it will have to decide what title the mayor is to be known by.

=== Mayoral functions ===
The functions devolved to the mayor are:

- housing and regeneration
- education, skills and training
- the adult education budget
- the functional power of competence
- housing and planning, including mayoral development areas and corporations, land and acquisition powers
- finance, through council precepts and business rate supplements
- transport, including bus grants and franchising powers

The mayor is a member of the Mayoral Council for England and the Council of the Nations and Regions.

=== Cabinet ===
As of June 2026, the cabinet of NEMSA is:

Name	Membership	Position	Nominating authority	Party
Kim McGuinness	Constituent	Mayor of the North East	NEMSA	Labour and Co-op
Karen Clark	Constituent	Cabinet Member for Finance and Investment and Deputy Mayor of the North East	Mayor of North Tyneside	Labour
Paul Mackings	Constituent	Cabinet Member for Home to the Green Energy Revolution	Leader of South Tyneside Council	Reform
Nick Allan	Constituent	Cabinet Member for a North East we are Proud to Call Home	Leader of Gateshead Council	Reform
Andrew Husband	Constituent	Cabinet Member for a Welcoming Home to Global Trade	Leader of Durham County Council	Reform
Colin Ferguson	Constituent	Cabinet Member for Transport	Leader of Newcastle City Council	Liberal Democrats
Christopher Enyon	Constituent	Cabinet Member for Home of Real Opportunity	Leader of Sunderland City Council	Reform
Glen Sanderson	Constituent	Cabinet Member for Home to a Growing and Vibrant Economy	Leader of Northumberland County Council	Conservative
John McCabe	Non-constituent		Business Board	
Martin Brookes	Non-constituent		Community and voluntary sector	

== See also ==
- Tyne and Wear Passenger Transport Executive
