= 2028 Norfolk and Suffolk mayoral election =

Proposed mayoral election

- 4 May 2028
Candidate	David Beavan	Carli Harper	Kevin Keable
Party	Independent	Labour	Liberal Democrats
Candidate	Tim Passmore	Caroline Topping	David Bick
Party	Conservative	Green	Reform
Mayor before election
Did not exist
Elected mayor
TBD

The 2028 Norfolk and Suffolk mayoral election is due to be held on 4 May 2028, postponed from an originally scheduled date of 7 May 2026, to elect the inaugural Mayor of Norfolk and Suffolk who will lead the Norfolk and Suffolk Combined County Authority. It will be held at the same time as other mayoral elections in England.

== Candidates ==
The Conservative Party, Green Party, Labour Party, Liberal Democrats and Reform UK have all announced candidates. There is also one independent candidate.

=== Conservative Party ===
The Conservative Party selected Tim Passmore as their candidate in August 2025. He has been the police and crime commissioner for Suffolk since 2012.

=== Green Party ===
In September 2025, the Green Party of England and Wales announced that Caroline Topping had been selected as their candidate. She has been the leader of East Suffolk District Council since 2023.

=== Labour Party ===
The Labour Party selected Carli Harper as their candidate in October 2025. She has been a councillor on Norwich City Council since 2024.

=== Liberal Democrats ===
The Liberal Democrats selected Kevin Keable as their candidate in November 2025. He has been the chairman of the East of England Energy Group since 2023.

=== Reform UK ===
Reform UK selected David Bick as their candidate in December 2025. He is currently a councillor for Thetford West on Norfolk County Council, having previously been a Conservative councillor on Lambeth Council.

=== Independent candidates ===
David Beavan, an independent councillor for Southwold ward on East Suffolk Council, announced his mayoral candidacy in November 2025, stating that he was "unimpressed" by the other candidates. Beavan was elected as a Liberal Democrat but was expelled from the party in June 2024 for supporting Adrian Ramsay, co-leader of the Green Party, in the 2024 general election.
