= 2019 North of Tyne mayoral election =

First mayoral election in the North of Tyne

- 2 May 2019
- Turnout: 32.33%
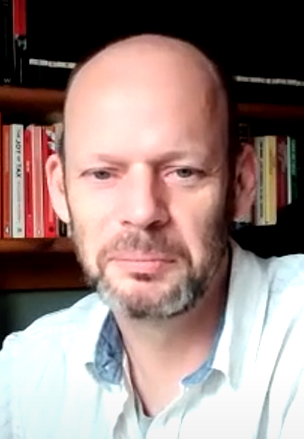

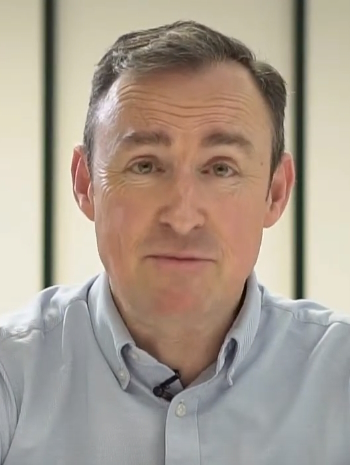

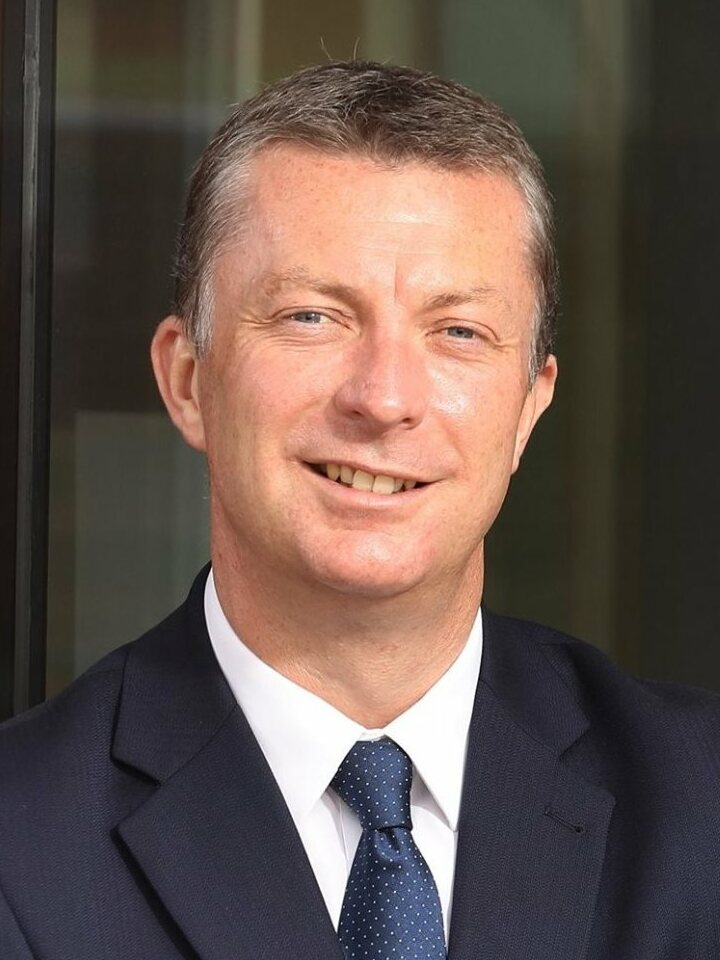
Candidate	Jamie Driscoll	Charlie Hoult	John McCabe
Party	Labour Co-op	Conservative	Independent
1st Round vote	62,034	45,494	31,507
Percentage	33.9%	24.9%	17.2%
2nd Round vote	76,862	60,089	Eliminated
Percentage	56.1%	43.9%	Eliminated
Candidate	John Appleby	Hugh Jackson
Party	Liberal Democrats	UKIP
1st Round vote	23,768	20,131
Percentage	13.0%	11.0%
2nd Round vote	Eliminated	Eliminated
Percentage	Eliminated	Eliminated
- Election results by local authority
Leader of the North of Tyne Combined Authority before election
Norma Redfearn (interim)
Labour
Mayor
Jamie Driscoll
Labour

The inaugural North of Tyne mayoral election was held on 2 May 2019 to elect the first Mayor of the North of Tyne. The area was made up of Newcastle upon Tyne, North Tyneside and Northumberland. Subsequent elections have been for the Mayor of the North East, a position covering an expanded area.

== Background ==
The election followed the creation of the North of Tyne Combined Authority in November 2018, covering the area of Newcastle upon Tyne, North Tyneside and Northumberland councils. Councils which are not currently part of the devolution deal but were previously included in unsuccessful discussions to establish a mayor of the North East, Metropolitan Borough of Gateshead, Durham County Council, Sunderland City Council and South Tyneside Metropolitan Borough Council, were invited to join the authority.

== Procedure ==
This election uses the supplementary voting system, with electors having two votes. One vote for the first choice candidate, with an optional vote for a second choice candidate used if no candidate has more than 50% of the first choice votes.

== Campaign ==
Newcastle councillor Jamie Driscoll was announced as Labour's candidate in February 2019, having been elected on a platform of local procurement, promoting collective ownership, starting a "People's Bank", starting housing co-operatives and a renewable energy company. He defeated Newcastle City Council leader Nick Forbes to win the party's nomination.

The Liberal Democrats announced John Appleby, who was formerly head of mechanical engineering at Newcastle University, as their candidate in December 2018. He had previously been a councillor, mayoral candidate and parliamentary candidate.

Driscoll was the bookmakers' favourite, followed by Charlie Hoult.

== Candidates ==
=== Labour ===
Jamie Driscoll was selected as Labour's candidate for Mayor of the North of Tyne on 20 February 2019, with voting having taken place from late January 2019.

Labour selection
Candidate	Votes	Percentage
Jamie Driscoll	2,514	56.8%
Nick Forbes	1,913	43.2%

Labour required candidates to nominate themselves in November 2018, ahead of a shortlisting and nomination process culminating in a selection vote in January 2019. Paul Brannen, Jamie Driscoll, Nick Forbes and Ian Grayson nominated themselves at this point. Grayson withdrew from selection in December, announcing his support for Forbes. To be on the selection ballot, candidates need at least two nominations from local parties or affiliated trade unions. The party re-opened self-nominations in December 2018 in the hope of improving the diversity of candidates available. North Tyneside councillor Karen Lee nominated herself in this round. Driscoll received nominations from five Constituency Labour Parties and four affiliated trade unions, whilst Forbes received nominations from four Constituency Labour Parties, three affiliated trade unions and two affiliated societies, and Lee was nominated by two Constituency Labour Parties. Brannen withdrew with one nomination from a trade union. Lee withdrew in January, considering her late entry into the selection to have limited her campaign.

Driscoll was backed by Noam Chomsky, Clive Lewis, Ken Loach, Paul Mason, John McDonnell and Laura Pidcock. Forbes was backed by Andy Burnham, Brendan Foster and Norma Redfearn as well as former candidates Paul Brannen, Ian Grayson and Karen Lee.

Judith Kirton-Darling, Catherine McKinnell and Chi Onwurah had previously been discussed as potential candidates.

As Driscoll was also selected by the Co-operative Party, he sought election as a joint Labour and Co-operative Party candidate.

=== Conservative ===
The Conservative Party's selection process was due to conclude in early 2019. The party decided to delay selection until the Labour candidate was announced.

Business park manager Charlie Hoult announced that he'd be seeking the party's nomination in early March. He was endorsed by the property developer and former owner of Newcastle United F.C. John Hall. Former mayor of North Tyneside Linda Arkley announced her candidacy for the Conservative nomination on 8 March.

Charlie Hoult was named as the Conservative candidate on 15 March.

Former minister Martin Callanan, former parliamentary candidates Steve Kyte and Ian Levy, and former goalkeeper Steve Harper were previously discussed as potential candidates.

=== Liberal Democrats ===
The Liberal Democrats selected former Newcastle Councillor John Appleby to be their candidate. Other people who were discussed as potential candidates included David Faulkner, the former leader of Newcastle City Council, Fiona Hall, a former MEP for North East England, former council group leader Anita Lower, former parliamentary candidate Julie Pörksen and councillor Greg Stone.

=== Green Party ===
The Green Party did not contest the election due to the high (£5000) deposit required, and concerns that the way the combined authority had been set up did not represent "truly democratic devolution".

=== UK Independence Party ===
The UK Independence Party selected former Conservative councillor Hugh Jackson as its candidate in April 2019. Jackson had resigned as a Conservative councillor in 2008 after once joking about using euthanasia to reduce the number of children in care as a response to Labour policy suggestions.

=== Independents ===
John McCabe, businessman and then president of the North East England Chamber of Commerce, confirmed his intention to stand on 4 March 2019.

Jeremy Middleton, Ammar Mirza and David Ord were previously discussed as potential candidates.

== Results ==
2019 North of Tyne mayoral election
Party	Candidate	1st round		2nd round			1st round votesTransfer votes, 2nd round
Party	Candidate	Total	Of round	Transfers	Total	Of round	1st round votesTransfer votes, 2nd round
Labour	Jamie Driscoll	62,034	33.9%	14,828	76,862	56.1%	
Conservative	Charlie Hoult	45,494	24.9%	14,595	60,089	43.9%	
Independent	John McCabe	31,507	17.2%				
Liberal Democrats	John Appleby	23,768	13.0%				
UKIP	Hugh Jackson	20,131	11.0%				
Majority		16,773	12.2%				
Turnout		182,934					

=== Results by local authority ===
==== Newcastle upon Tyne ====
2019 North of Tyne mayoral election: Newcastle upon Tyne
Party	Candidate	1st round		2nd round			1st round votesTransfer votes, 2nd round
Party	Candidate	Total	Of round	Transfers	Total	Of round	1st round votesTransfer votes, 2nd round
Labour	Jamie Driscoll	26,077	40.4%	5,909	31,986	66.2%	
Conservative	Charlie Hoult	11,559	17.9%	4,806	16,365	33.8%	
Liberal Democrats	John Appleby	10,877	16.8%				
Independent	John McCabe	9,303	14.4%				
UKIP	Hugh Jackson	6,770	10.5%				
Majority		15,621	32.3%				
Turnout		64,586					

==== North Tyneside ====
2019 North of Tyne mayoral election: North Tyneside
Party	Candidate	1st round		2nd round			1st round votesTransfer votes, 2nd round
Party	Candidate	Total	Of round	Transfers	Total	Of round	1st round votesTransfer votes, 2nd round
Labour	Jamie Driscoll	19,858	37.5%	4,335	24,193	59.6%	
Conservative	Charlie Hoult	12,778	24.1%	3,598	16,376	40.4%	
Independent	John McCabe	7,992	15.1%				
UKIP	Hugh Jackson	7,050	13.3%				
Liberal Democrats	John Appleby	5,335	10.1%				
Majority		7,817	19.3%				
Turnout		53,013					

==== Northumberland ====
2019 North of Tyne mayoral election: Northumberland
Party	Candidate	1st round		2nd round			1st round votesTransfer votes, 2nd round
Party	Candidate	Total	Of round	Transfers	Total	Of round	1st round votesTransfer votes, 2nd round
Conservative	Charlie Hoult	21,157	32.4%	6,191	27,348	56.9%	
Labour	Jamie Driscoll	16,099	24.6%	4,584	20,683	43.1%	
Independent	John McCabe	14,212	21.8%				
Liberal Democrats	John Appleby	7,556	11.6%				
UKIP	Hugh Jackson	6,311	9.7%				
Majority		6,665	13.9%				
Turnout		65,335					
