= 2028 Greater Essex mayoral election =

Local election in the UK

- 4 May 2028
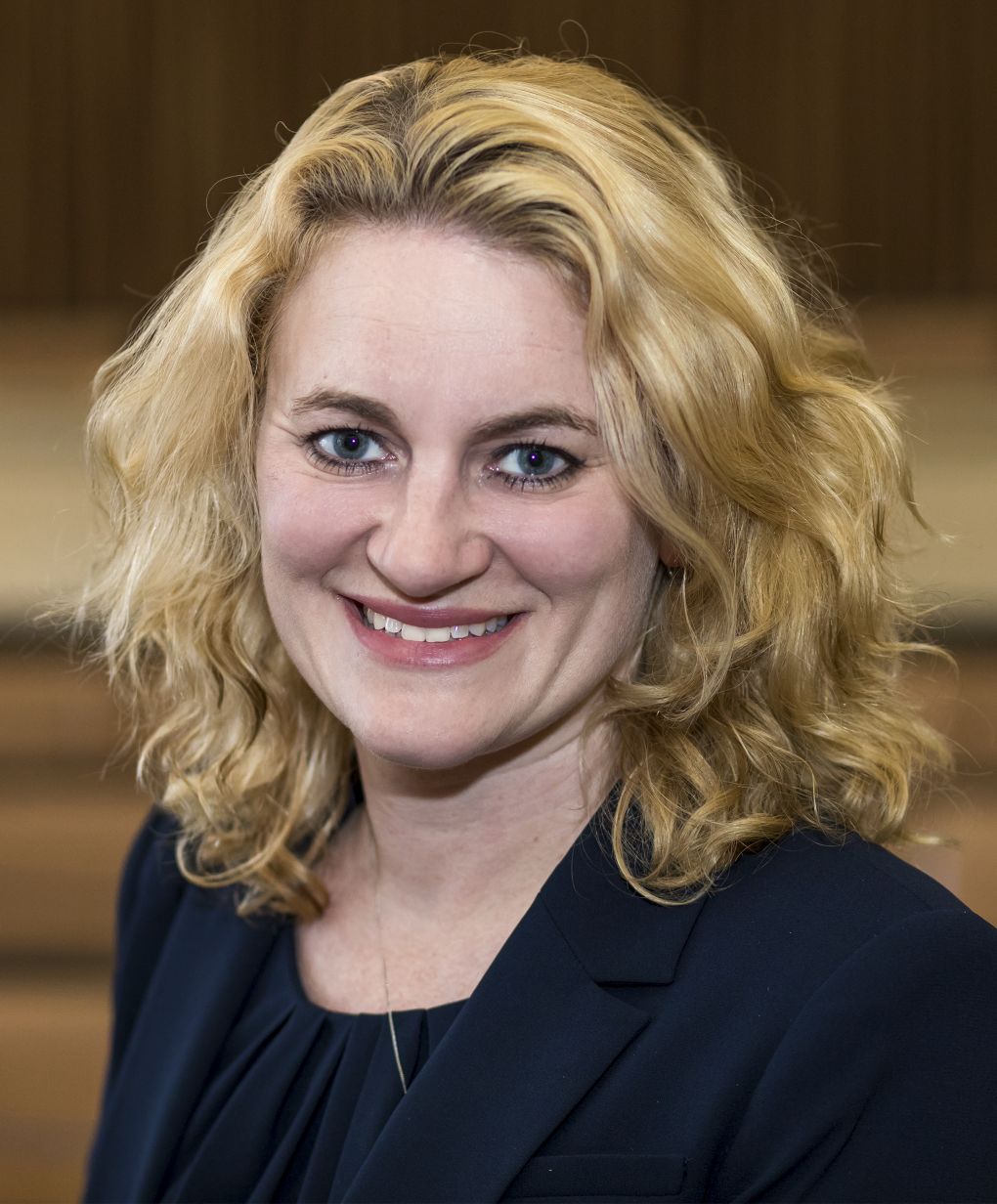
	Lib	Lab
Candidate	James Allen	Adam Fox	Louise McKinlay
Party	Liberal Democrats	Labour	Conservative
	Con	Grn	Ref
Candidate	James Miller	Natasha Osben	Peter Harris
Party	Confelicity	Green	Reform
Mayor before election
Did not exist
Elected mayor
TBD

The 2028 Greater Essex mayoral election is due to be held on 4 May 2028, postponed from an originally scheduled date of 7 May 2026. to elect the inaugural mayor of Greater Essex, on the same day as other local elections across the country including other mayoral elections.

== Background ==
Since 1998, the ceremonial county of Essex has been split between three principal local authorities, Essex County Council and the independent unitary authorities of Southend-on-Sea City Council and Thurrock Council, which are together known as Greater Essex for administrative purposes. (Note: Essex is the name of both the non-metropolitan county administered by Essex County Council and the ceremonial county which also includes the two independent unitary authority areas of Thurrock and Southend-on-Sea. To distinguish between the two, the term Greater Essex is also used to name the ceremonial county in an administrative context.) Since 1999, the UK Government has devolved powers to local parliaments, assemblies, authorities and mayors in the nations and regions of the UK. The three councils of Essex negotiated the creation of a devolved combined county authority for Essex under Rishi Sunak's Conservative government, however these negotiations fell through after an intervention by anti-devolution Conservative Essex MPs in February 2024.

In its manifesto for the 2024 general election, the victorious Labour Party under Keir Starmer pledged to introduce mayoral combined authorities to more areas of England. After the election, Starmer's new government resumed negotiations on devolution in Essex and the creation of a Greater Essex Combined County Authority which would be led by a directly elected mayor. In February 2025, the government accepted Greater Essex onto its devolution priority programme for England alongside five other areas. In July 2025, the government confirmed the Greater Essex Combined County Authority would be established in early 2026, with the inaugural mayoral election scheduled for 7 May 2026 as part of the 2026 local and mayoral elections. However, in December 2025, the government announced that the election was delayed and rescheduled for 4 May 2028 to allow for the completion of the ongoing reorganisation of local government, as was the case with other inaugural mayoral elections scheduled for 2026.

The election covers the entire ceremonial county of Essex. It is expected to be a two-horse race between the Conservative Party, which has traditionally dominated Essex, and the right-wing populist party Reform UK, which has gained support in the county since 2021 at their expense. Both parties have a major support base in the county, with party leaders Kemi Badenoch and Nigel Farage both representing Essex constituencies. Essex is also noted for its tradition of strong independent politicians in its local politics. These factors may make it difficult to predict the outcome of the election.

== Candidates ==
=== Conservative Party ===
The Conservative Party shortlisted three candidates in July 2025, Louise McKinlay, the deputy leader of Essex County Council, Roger Hirst, the police, fire and crime commissioner for Essex, and Thurrock businessman James Sinclair. The candidates were put to a membership vote in August 2025, with McKinlay winning selection as the party's candidate. Her campaign slogan is "Putting Essex First".

=== Liberal Democrats ===
The Liberal Democrats opened nominations in July 2025. In October 2025, the Liberal Democrats announced the selection of James Allen, a former justice of the peace, as its candidate.

=== Labour Party ===
The Labour Party opened and closed nominations for its candidate in August 2025. In October 2025, Labour announced that it had selected Adam Fox, the former deputy leader of Colchester City Council and its unsuccessful candidate in the 2024 Essex Police, Fire and Crime Commissioner election, after a hustings process with local party members.

=== Reform UK ===
In July 2025, Reform UK leader Nigel Farage told the BBC that its mayoral candidate will be from Essex. Russell Quirk, a TalkTV presenter and former Conservative councillor on Brentwood Borough Council, declared his intention to stand as Reform's candidate in September 2025. In November 2025, Reform UK said its selection process was still "ongoing and once completed we will make an announcement". In December, Tendring councillor and former Barking and Dagenham businessman Peter Harris was chosen to be the candidate.

=== Green Party ===
The Green Party opened nominations in July 2025. In October 2025, the party announced that it had selected Natasha Osben, its candidate for the constituency of Clacton in the 2024 general election, which was won by Reform UK's leader Nigel Farage.

=== Other ===
The Southend Confelicity Party, a localist party in Southend, announced its leader James Miller as its candidate in March 2025, who is campaigning on an anti-devolution platform. He was later followed by his father, Southend businessman and Adventure Island owner Philip Miller, who announced his candidacy as an independent on 8 September 2025, campaigning on a platform of blocking planned new town developments on the green belt and pursuing tougher action on crime. Despite their competing candidacies, Philip has declared his intention to vote for James.
