= Business Rate Supplements Act 2009 =

Act of the Parliament of the United Kingdom

Business Rate Supplements Act 2009 (Note: Section 32(4).)
- Act of Parliament
- Parliament of the United Kingdom
- Long title: An Act to confer power on the Greater London Authority and certain local authorities to impose a levy on non-domestic ratepayers to raise money for expenditure on projects expected to promote economic development; and for connected purposes.
- Citation: 2009 c. 7
- Territorial extent: England and Wales (Note: Section 32(3).)

Dates
- Royal assent: 2 July 2009
- Commencement: 2 July 2009 (sections 28–31); Various; (Note: Section 32(1)–(2).)
Other legislation
Amended by	Non-Domestic Rating Act 2023

Status: Amended

History of passage through Parliament

Text of statute as originally enacted

Text of the Business Rate Supplements Act 2009 as in force today (including any amendments) within the United Kingdom, from legislation.gov.uk.

The Business Rate Supplements Act 2009 (c. 7) is an act of the Parliament of the United Kingdom. It creates a power to impose business rate supplements. It gives effect to the proposals contained in the command paper "Business rate supplements: a White Paper" (Cm 7230).

Sections 28 to 32 came into force on 2 July 2009. The rest of the act, except for section 16(5) and schedule 2, came into force, in England, on 19 August 2009.

== Bibliography ==
- "Business Rate Supplements Act 2009". Current Law Statutes Annotated 2009. Sweet & Maxwell. Thomson Reuters. 2010. Volume 1. Chapter 7. pp 7-1 to 7-27.
- Halsbury's Statutes
