= Northumbria Police and Crime Commissioner =

Elected official responsible for Northumbria Police

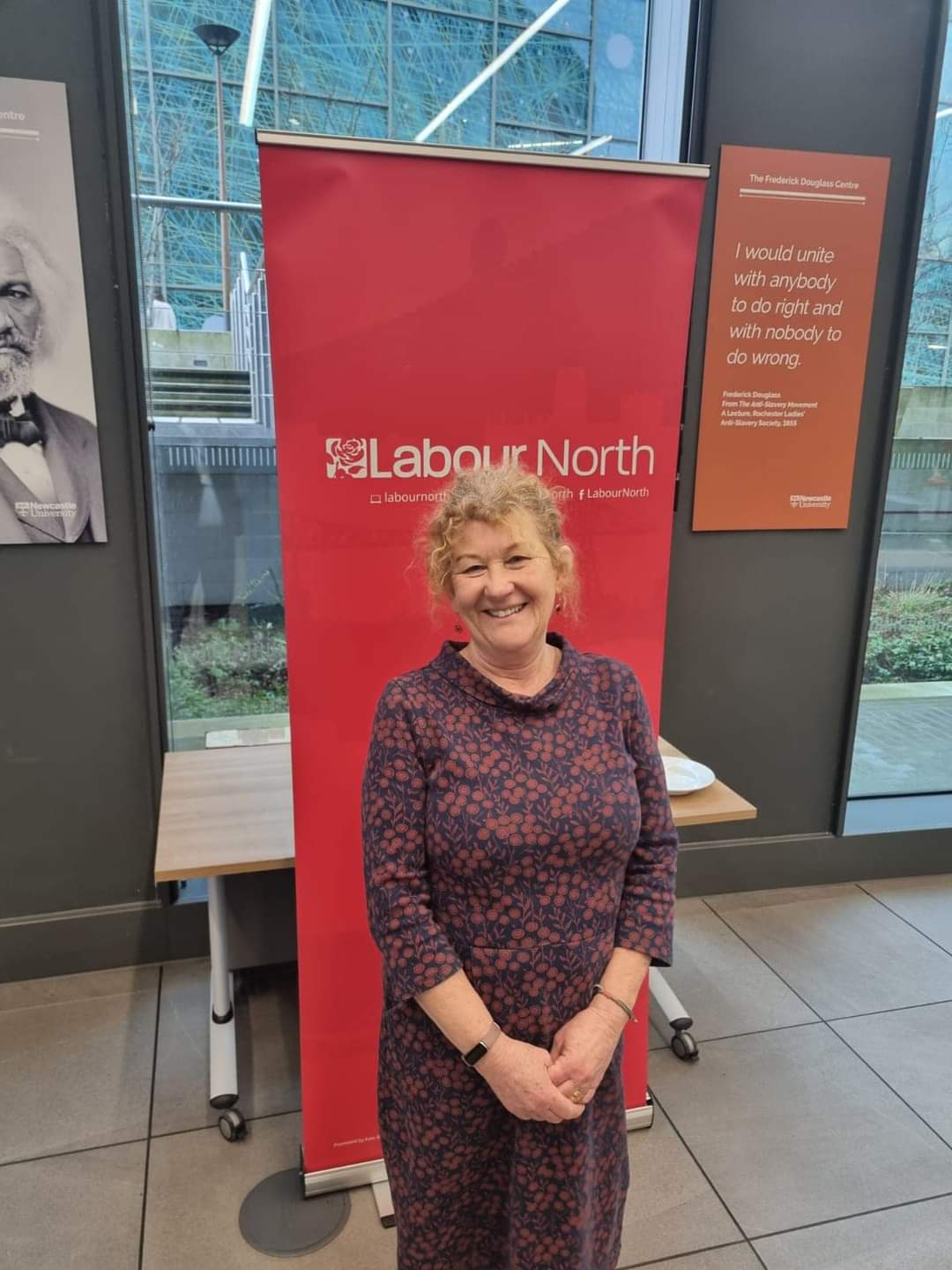
- Incumbent; Susan Dungworth since 9 May 2024
- Police and crime commissioner of Northumbria Police
- Reports to: Northumbria Police and Crime Panel
- Appointer: Electorate of Northumberland and Tyne and Wear
- Term length: Four years
- Constituting instrument: Police Reform and Social Responsibility Act 2011
- Precursor: Northumbria Police Authority
- Inaugural holder: Vera Baird
- Formation: 22 November 2012
- Deputy: Clare Penny-Evans
- Salary: £88,600
- Website: northumbria-pcc.gov.uk

The Northumbria Police and Crime Commissioner (PCC) is an elected official in the United Kingdom. The office was created in November 2012 following the enactment of the Police Reform and Social Responsibility Act 2011. The PCC is tasked with the governance of Northumbria Police, responsible for the ceremonial counties of Northumberland and Tyne and Wear. Susan Dungworth is the current PCC. Clare Penny-Evans is the current Deputy PCC.

== Post holders ==
Name	Political party	From	To
Vera Baird	Labour	22 November 2012	7 June 2019
Ruth Durham (acting)	Independent	4 June 2019	19 July 2019
Kim McGuinness	Labour	19 July 2019	8 May 2024
Susan Dungworth	Labour	9 May 2024	Incumbent

A by-election was held on 18 July 2019, after Baird stepped down in order to become the Victims' Commissioner. McGuinness was elected the first Mayor of the North East on 3 May 2024.

== Northumbria Police and Crime Plan ==
To accord with the Police Reform and Social Responsibility Act 2011 PCCs must produce and work to a Police and Crime Plan; this Plan must be in step with UK Government Policy including, notably, Crime Prevention. Northumbria's PCC present Police and Crime Plan was first published in March 2013 and covers the period to 2018.

=== Initiatives and work of Northumbria's PCC in accordance with the 2013-2018 Police and Crime Plan ===
==== Grants and awards ====
===== Issued =====
From 1 April 2015 Police and Crime Commissioners were made responsible for providing key emotional and practical support services for victims of crime in their locality. Funding to support this is provided by the Ministry of Justice through an allocation based on a population formula. The Northumbria PCC determines awards across six local authority areas.

===== Won =====
====== Police Innovation Fund ======
In March 2015 the PCC secured nearly £3m for the funding of projects aimed at supporting and protecting vulnerable members of society.

In collaboration with Durham Constabulary funding of £171,510 was secured in March 2016 to implement polygraph and lie detection testing for pre and post-conviction sexual offenders.

==== Community Safety Partnerships ====
The PCC works closely with the six Community Safety Partnerships in the region. These Partnerships were set up under the Crime & Disorder Act of 1998 and are made up of representatives from the 'responsible authorities', which are the:

- police
- local authorities
- fire and rescue authorities
- probation service
- health

==== Anti-Social Behaviour (ASB) ====
The PCC has shaped Northumbria's Community Trigger which gives victims and communities the right to demand that persistent antisocial behaviour is dealt with. The requirement of a Community Trigger is a provision of the Anti-social Behaviour, Crime and Policing Act 2014.

Following public consultations a Community Remedy was developed which provides a menu of local resolutions that victims of minor crime and ASB could request as a way of seeking justice outside of the formal criminal justice route.

==== South of Tyne Triage Team ====
In September 2014 the PCC established a South of Tyne Triage Team. The team consists of dedicated police officers working alongside mental health nurses who attend incidents involving people with mental health problems. The team provides additional support and diversion to appropriate health care services. Subsequent independent research has suggested that this approach has reduced the need for section 136 detentions under The Mental Act.

==== Victim focus ====
===== Victims First Northumbria =====
The Ministry of Justice devolves funding for victim support to the PCCs. In April 2015 the Northumbria PCC established and at present serves on the Board of Victims First Northumbria. Victims First has the declared vision 'to create a Northumbria area where victims of crime feel confident to seek help and when they do, they are provided with a choice of high quality support tailored to meet their individual needs'.

===== Court Observers Panel =====
In January 2015 the PCC set up a Court Observers Panel whose members were drawn from local community volunteers. The panel observed 30 adult rape trials at Newcastle Crown Court between January 2015 and June 2016. The brief for the Panel was to assess whether a rape complainant's needs are properly considered in court proceedings, whether the impact of sexual abuse on the ability to testify is properly taken into account and to identify any occurrence where it could be construed that the complainant is being tried rather than the defendant. The Panel's work resulted in the report "Seeing is Believing", published in February 2017.

==== Crime reduction ====
The work of the PCC where it specifically addresses crime reduction may be seen as falling into two broad areas

1. the promotion of quality assurance practice within the police force itself
2. the raising of the general public's awareness, sometimes with supporting resources, of crime and criminal activity and how it may be confronted.

===== Police Quality Assurance =====
====== Non reportable incidents ======
The PCC has ensured that Northumbria Police conduct a weekly audit of incidents which do not result in a crime report. This works to ensure that the decision not to produce a crime report for an incident is correct and supported by sufficient rationale. Key learning points from these audits are circulated to Area Command Senior Management Teams.

====== Repeat victims review ======
The PCC ensures that all repeat victims of crime are reviewed by Northumbria Police and, where they are needed, harm reduction plans are implemented to reduce further harm.

====== Police sergeant training ======
The PCC ensures that police sergeants are properly trained to understand and scrutinise crime recording by their teams.

===== Crime awareness raising =====
Working with Newcastle Council funding from the late night levy the PCC secured the provision of a Safe Haven vehicle staffed by paramedics for anyone finding themselves vulnerable on a night out in the town.

The PCC publicly lobbied the Home Secretary to ban 'legal highs' and prosecute the people supplying such drugs. A drop in the occurrence of offences associated with the use of such drugs has been noted following the enactment of the Novel Psychoactive Substances (NPS) Act 2016.

==== Community confidence ====
Through working with Northumbria Police the PCC helped bring about the introduction of 30 LGBT Liaison Officers to promote awareness of LGBT issues, encourage reporting of homophobic/transphobic crime and help ensure a victim led approach for such crimes.

In 2016 the Office for National Statistics (ONS) revealed that Northumbria Police recorded a total of 94,002 crimes in the year ending March, an increase of 29% on the previous 12-month period. Both the PCC and the police believe that this increase is significantly due to increased public confidence and improved recording of offences.

==== Domestic and sexual abuse ====
Working in partnership with the Vulnerable Adults Multi-Agency Safeguarding Hub (MASH) pilot in Gateshead the PCC intended to incorporate domestic abuse into their remit and to focus on children who are living in a household where domestic abuse occurs.
