= Newcastle City Council elections =

Local government elections in Newcastle upon Tyne, England

Newcastle City Council elections are generally held three years out of every four, with a third of the council being elected each time. Newcastle City Council is the local authority for the metropolitan borough of the Newcastle upon Tyne in Tyne and Wear, England. Since the last boundary changes in 2018, 78 councillors have been elected from 26 wards.

== Council elections ==
- 1998 Newcastle City Council election
- 1999 Newcastle City Council election
- 2000 Newcastle City Council election
- 2002 Newcastle City Council election
- 2003 Newcastle City Council election
- 2004 Newcastle City Council election (whole council elected after boundary changes)
- 2006 Newcastle City Council election
- 2007 Newcastle City Council election
- 2008 Newcastle City Council election
- 2010 Newcastle City Council election
- 2011 Newcastle City Council election
- 2012 Newcastle City Council election
- 2014 Newcastle City Council election
- 2015 Newcastle City Council election
- 2016 Newcastle City Council election
- 2018 Newcastle City Council election (whole council elected after boundary changes)
- 2019 Newcastle City Council election
- 2021 Newcastle City Council election
- 2022 Newcastle City Council election
- 2023 Newcastle City Council election
- 2024 Newcastle City Council election
- 2026 Newcastle City Council election (whole council elected after boundary changes)

== City result maps ==
2004 results map

2006 results map

2007 results map

2008 results map

2010 results map

2011 results map

2012 results map

2014 results map

2015 results map

2016 results map

2018 results map

2019 results map

2021 results map

2022 results map

2023 results map

2024 results map

2026 results map

== By-election results ==
=== 1994-1998 ===
Newburn By-Election 7 November 1996
Party	Candidate	Votes	%	±%
Labour	Linda Isobel Wright	920	76.9	
Conservative	Alistair Stewart Hind	275	23.1	
Majority		645	53.8	
Turnout		1,195		
Labour hold		Swing		

Woolsington By-Election 1 May 1997
Party	Candidate	Votes	%	±%
Labour	Lilian Mary Kennedy	2,630	68.1	−7.2
Conservative	Colin Forster	657	17.0	+5.2
Liberal Democrats	Robert Ernest Walker	576	14.9	+1.9
Majority		1,973	51.1	
Turnout		3,863	65.8	
Labour hold		Swing		

South Gosforth By-Election 12 June 1997
Party	Candidate	Votes	%	±%
Liberal Democrats	Thomas David George Woodwark	1,474	43.7	−15.0
Conservative	Marie Summersby	1,096	32.5	+1.3
Labour	Susan Jane MacDonald Stirling	800	23.7	+13.6
Majority		378	11.2	
Turnout		3,370		
Liberal Democrats hold		Swing		

West City By-Election 2 October 1997
Party	Candidate	Votes	%	±%
Labour	Doreen James	468	81.5	+2.0
Liberal Democrats	Phillip George Lower	74	12.9	+5.9
Conservative	Timothy David Troman	32	5.6	−3.2
Majority		394	68.6	
Turnout		574	10.3	
Labour hold		Swing		

Heaton By-Election 20 November 1997
Party	Candidate	Votes	%	±%
Labour	Colin Wappat	564	52.9	−10.7
Conservative	Jeremy Peter Middleton	211	19.8	+6.0
Liberal Democrats	Neil John Bradbury	158	14.8	+4.5
Green	Christopher Patrick Hayday	84	7.9	+1.9
Communist	Martin Richard Levy	50	4.7	+4.7
Majority		353	33.1	
Turnout		1,067	11.5	
Labour hold		Swing		

=== 1998-2002 ===
Dene By-Election 16 July 1998
Party	Candidate	Votes	%	±%
Liberal Democrats	Gregory Martin Stone	1,961	58.1	+2.6
Labour	John Lawrence Young	1,061	31.4	+0.6
Conservative	Alice Gingell	353	10.5	−3.2
Majority		900	26.7	
Turnout		3,375	29.5	
Liberal Democrats gain from Labour		Swing		

Byker By-Election 4 March 1999
Party	Candidate	Votes	%	±%
Labour	Michelle Pike	366	56.8	−18.8
Liberal Democrats	Thomas James Thompson	206	32.0	+13.1
Green	Pamela Jane Woolner	37	5.7	+5.7
Conservative	Jeremy Peter Middleton	35	5.4	−0.1
Majority		160	24.8	
Turnout		644	9.7	
Labour hold		Swing		

Scotswood By-Election 14 October 1999
Party	Candidate	Votes	%	±%
Labour	Hazel Stephenson	490	66.9	−16.5
Liberal Democrats	Susan Anne Reilly	180	24.6	+16.0
Conservative	Peter Lumley	62	8.5	+0.4
Majority		310	42.3	
Turnout		732	14.9	
Labour hold		Swing		

Jesmond By-Election 7 June 2001
Party	Candidate	Votes	%	±%
Liberal Democrats	Elizabeth Dicken	2,496	46.0	+6.5
Labour	Fiona Karen Clarke	1,659	30.5	−1.3
Conservative	Jonjo McNamara	1,116	20.5	−1.5
Independent	Marie Summersby	160	2.9	+2.9
Majority		837	15.5	
Turnout		5,431		
Liberal Democrats gain from Labour		Swing		

Walkergate By-Election 7 June 2001
Party	Candidate	Votes	%	±%
Labour	John Stokel-Walker	2,672	58.3	+4.0
Liberal Democrats	Belinda Knowles	1,606	35.0	−4.7
Conservative	Keith Gilfillan	306	6.7	+0.6
Majority		1,066	23.3	
Turnout		4,584		
Labour hold		Swing		

=== 2002-2006 ===
Benwell By-Election 18 July 2002
Party	Candidate	Votes	%	±%
Labour	Eric Mackinlay	700	55.8	−3.0
Liberal Democrats	Brian Moore	383	30.5	+13.6
Conservative	Carolyn Smith	136	10.8	+0.0
Green	Jesus Miguel-Garcia	36	2.9	−1.4
Majority		317	25.3	
Turnout		1,255	24.3	
Labour hold		Swing		

Walker By-Election 4 September 2003
Party	Candidate	Votes	%	±%
Labour	John Stokel-Walker	1,440	62.1	−12.3
BNP	Jonathan Keys	395	17.1	+17.1
Liberal Democrats	John McLennan	370	16.0	−0.4
Conservative	Joseph Prince	112	4.8	−1.7
Majority		1,045	45.0	
Turnout		2,317	47.7	
Labour hold		Swing		

=== 2006-2010 ===
Lemington By-Election 30 November 2006
Party	Candidate	Votes	%	±%
Liberal Democrats	Lawrence Hunter	1,180	46.7	−9.3
Labour	Ruth Robson	815	32.2	−11.8
BNP	Kenneth Booth	383	15.2	+15.2
Conservative	Jason Smith	147	5.8	+5.8
Majority		365	14.5	
Turnout		2,525	34.1	
Liberal Democrats gain from Labour		Swing		

Wingrove delayed Election 14 June 2007 (2)
Party	Candidate	Votes	%	±%
Labour	Nigel Todd	1,051		
Liberal Democrats	Ayaz Siddique	948		
Labour	Alyson Hampshire	908		
Liberal Democrats	Deborah Wilkinson	869		
Green	Jenny Pearson	186		
Green	John Pearson	183		
Conservative	Neil Archibald	173		
Conservative	Alexander Le Vey	140		
BNP	Viv Browne	81		
BNP	Graham Hodgson	80		
Turnout		4,619	31.2	
Labour hold		Swing		
Liberal Democrats hold		Swing		

Fenham By-Election 29 January 2009
Party	Candidate	Votes	%	±%
Liberal Democrats	Mitzi Emery	1,049	33.9	−11.8
Labour	Helen McStravick	1,025	33.1	−3.3
BNP	Ken Booth	836	27.0	+18.0
Conservative	Sarah Armstrong	186	6.0	−2.9
Majority		24	0.8	
Turnout		3,096	39.6	
Liberal Democrats gain from Labour		Swing		

=== 2010-2014 ===
Ouseburn By-Election 15 November 2012
Party	Candidate	Votes	%	±%
Labour	Stephen Powers	714	47.6%	+11.7%
Liberal Democrats	Mark Nelson	665	44.3%	−6.3%
Newcastle First	Ian Fraser	73	4.9%	+4.9%
Conservative	Joshua Chew	49	3.3%	−0.7%
Majority		49	3.3%	
Labour hold		Swing		

Castle By-Election 25 April 2013
Party	Candidate	Votes	%	±%
Liberal Democrats	Phillip Lower	1,165	43.7%%	−6.2%
Labour	Ben Riley	1,043	39.2%	+4.7%
Newcastle First	John Gordon	215	8.1%	+0.1%
Conservative	Jennifer Nixon	194	7.3%	−0.3%
TUSC	Rory Jobe	48	1.8%	+1.8%
Majority		122	4.5%	
Liberal Democrats hold		Swing		

South Heaton By-Election 25 April 2013
Party	Candidate	Votes	%	±%
Labour	Denise Jones	798	61.2%	−8.2%
Green	Andrew Grey	205	15.7%	+3.4%
Liberal Democrats	Rachel Auld	114	8.7%	−0.5%
TUSC	Paul Phillips	69	5.3%	+1.0%
Conservative	Katie Bennett	52	4.0%	−0.7%
Newcastle First	Timothy Gilks	44	3.4%	+3.4%
Independent	Reg Sibley	22	1.7%	+1.7%
Majority		593		
Labour hold		Swing		

Walkergate By-Election 6 June 2013
Party	Candidate	Votes	%	±%
Labour	Stephen Wood	1,080	44.0%	−24.1%
UKIP	Lorraine Smith	668	27.2%	+27.2%
Liberal Democrats	Kevin Brown	460	18.8%	−4.2%
Independent	Davy Hicks	64	2.6%	+2.6%
Newcastle First	Olga Shorton	61	2.5%	+2.5%
Conservative	Marian McWilliams	54	2.2%	−3.1%
Green	Martin Collins	30	1.2%	+1.2%
TUSC	Bobbie Cranney	24	1.0%	+1.0%
Independent	Reg Sibley	12	0.5%	+0.5%
Majority		412	16.8%	
Turnout		2,453		
Labour hold		Swing		

=== 2014-2018 ===
North Jesmond By-Election 28 August 2014
Party	Candidate	Votes	%	±%
Liberal Democrats	Gerry Keating	711	52.5%	+19.9%
Labour	Peter Smith	320	23.6%	−7.3%
Conservative	Duncan Crute	117	8.6%	−5.9%
UKIP	Daniel Thompson	112	8.3%	+0.7%
Green	Shehla Naqvi	94	6.9%	−7.6%
Majority		391	28.9%	13.6%
Liberal Democrats hold		Swing		

Blakelaw By-Election 15 September 2016
Party	Candidate	Votes	%	±%
Labour	Nora Casey	1,004	41.9%	−21.3%
Liberal Democrats	Ciaran Morrissey	654	27.3%	+18.2%
UKIP	Ritchie Lane	443	18.5%	+2.4%
Conservative	James Langley	190	7.9%	+0.3%
Green	Brendan Derham	105	4.4%	+0.4%
Majority		350	14.6%	
Labour hold		Swing		

Blakelaw By-Election 24 November 2016
Party	Candidate	Votes	%	±%
Labour	Oskar Andrew Avery	892	44.9%	−25.7%
Liberal Democrats	Ciaran Joseph Morrissey	784	39.4%	+21.4%
Newcastle First	John Alan Gordon	164	8.2%	+8.2%
Conservative	James Gerard Langley	148	7.4%	−4.0%
Majority		108	5.5%	
Labour hold		Swing		

South Heaton By-Election 16 March 2017
Party	Candidate	Votes	%	±%
Labour	Clare Penny-Evans	768	46.8%	−5.4%
Green	Andrew Gray	444	27.1%	+2.4%
Liberal Democrats	Chris Boyle	260	15.0%	+9.7%
UKIP	Tony Sanderson	88	5.4%	−4.6%
Conservative	Chris Murray	80	4.9%	+0.2%
Majority		329	19.7%	
Labour hold		Swing		

=== 2018-2022 ===
Castle By-Election 9 September 2021
Party	Candidate	Votes	%	±%
Liberal Democrats	Thom Campion	1,306	42.5	
Labour	Andrew Herridge	773	25.1	
Conservative	John Watts	657	21.4	
Green	Andrew Thorp	250	8.1	
North East	Brian Moore	89	2.9	
Majority		533	17.3	
Liberal Democrats hold		Swing		

=== 2022-2026 ===
Byker By-Election 2 March 2023
Party	Candidate	Votes	%	±%
Labour	Hayder Qureshi	591	46.9	−18.1
Green	Nick Hartley	375	29.7	+15.3
Liberal Democrats	Mark Ridyard	188	14.9	+9.2
Conservative	Aaron Whelan Harvey	107	8.5	−6.5
Majority		216	17.1	
Turnout		1,261		
Labour hold		Swing		

North Jesmond By-Election 12 September 2024
Party	Candidate	Votes	%	±%
Liberal Democrats	Peter Allen	740	64.5	+16.4
Labour	Callum Buchanan	234	20.4	−18.1
Green	Shehla Naqvi	93	8.1	−4.6
Conservative	Stephen Dawes	35	3.1	−3.0
Reform	Anas el-Hamri	26	2.3	+2.3
Party of Women	Liz Panton	19	1.7	+1.7
Majority		506	44.1	
Turnout		1,147		
Liberal Democrats hold		Swing		

South Jesmond By-Election 14 August 2025
Party	Candidate	Votes	%	±%
Green	Sarah Peters	578	36.4	+15.2
Liberal Democrats	June Browne	523	33.0	+7.3
Labour	Owen Bell	267	16.8	−25.3
Reform	Gavin Maw	173	10.9	+10.9
Conservative	Stephen Dawes	45	2.8	−5.7
Majority		55	3.4	
Turnout		1,586	30.8	
Green gain from Labour		Swing		

=== 2026-2030 ===
Throckley, Walbottle and Newburn By-Election 27 August 2026
Party	Candidate	Votes	%	±%
Reform	Martin Evison	901	39.0	
Liberal Democrats	Stephen Kelly	670	29.0	
Labour	Linda Wright	534	23.1	
Green	Kimberley Barrass	103	4.5	
Conservative	Alexis Fernandes	101	4.4	
Majority		231	10.0	
Turnout		2,309		
Reform hold		Swing		
