= 2022 Newcastle City Council election =

2022 local election in Newcastle

- 5 May 2022

27 out of 78 seats to Newcastle City Council 40 seats needed for a majority
	First party	Second party
Leader	Nick Kemp	Nick Cott
Party	Labour	Liberal Democrats
Leader's seat	Byker	Fawdon & West Gosforth
Last election	52 seats, 39.2%	20 seats, 19.5%
Seats before	50	20
Seats won	19	7
Seats after	51	21
Seat change	▼1	▲1
Popular vote	31,264	16,556
Percentage	44.1%	23.4%
Swing	▲4.9%	▲3.9%
	Third party	Fourth party
Leader	N/A	Jason Smith
Party	Independent	Newcastle Ind.
Last election	3 seats, 7.0%	3 seats, 6.8%
Seats before	4	3
Seats won	1	0
Seats after	3	3
Seat change	Steady	Steady
Popular vote	3,434	4,062
Percentage	4.8%	5.7%
Swing	▼2.2%	▼1.1%
- Winner of each seat at the 2022 Newcastle City Council election
Council control before election
Nick Forbes
Labour
Council control after election
Nick Kemp
Labour

The 2022 Newcastle City Council election took place on 5 May 2022. Twenty-seven of the 78 seats on Newcastle City Council were contested: the usual third of the council, plus a casual vacancy in Benwell and Scotswood. The election took place alongside other local elections across the United Kingdom. In the previous council election in 2021, the Labour Party maintained its control of the council, holding 52 seats after the election. There were twenty Liberal Democrat councillors, three independent councillors and three Newcastle Independents.

== Background ==
=== History ===
Result of the 2021 council election

The Local Government Act 1972 created a two-tier system of metropolitan counties and districts covering Greater Manchester, Merseyside, South Yorkshire, Tyne and Wear, the West Midlands, and West Yorkshire starting in 1974. Newcastle was a district of the Tyne and Wear metropolitan county. The Local Government Act 1985 abolished the metropolitan counties, with metropolitan districts taking on most of their powers as metropolitan boroughs. The North of Tyne Combined Authority was created in 2018 and began electing the mayor of the North of Tyne from 2019, which was given strategic powers covering a region covering some of the same area as the former Tyne and Wear metropolitan county, as well as Northumberland. Since its creation, Newcastle has variously been under Labour, Liberal Democrat and Conservative control. The Liberal Democrats held a majority of seats on the council from 2004 until 2011, when Labour gained enough seats to control the council. Nick Forbes became leader of the council. Labour continued to gain seats until the 2019 election, when the party lost two seats but continued to have an overall majority. In the 2021 Newcastle City Council election, Labour lost another two seats to hold 52, having won 18 of the 28 seats contested with 39.2% of the vote. The Liberal Democrats held 20 seats, having received 19.5% of the vote. Three independent councillors and three Newcastle Independents completed the council; independent candidates received 7.0% of the vote across the city and Newcastle Independents candidates received 6.8%. The Conservatives received 17.6% of the vote and the Green Party received 9.1%, but neither party won a seat. The Local Government Boundary Commission for England produced new boundaries for Newcastle ahead of the 2018 election, meaning that the 2018 elections were all-out, with all councillors being elected before returning to electing by thirds. The seats due for election in 2022 were those won by the first-placed candidate in each ward in 2018.

=== Election background ===
Following the 2021 election, Nick Kemp challenged Nick Forbes for the leadership of the Labour group. Forbes had served as a councillor since 2000, as Labour group leader since 2007 and as council leader since 2011. Kemp had served as a councillor since 2002 and had resigned as cabinet member for environmental and regulatory services in 2020, saying that he was being undermined; Forbes said at the time that he had recently received complaints about Kemp. Karen Kilgour also challenged the incumbent deputy group leader, Joyce McCarty. Forbes defeated Kemp by 30 votes to 22, while Kilgour, regarded as an ally of Kemp, defeated McCarty by 28 votes to 24. Forbes failed to win reselection as Labour's candidate in Arthur's Hill, and subsequently confirmed that he would stand down from the council at the election. Labour councillors chose Nick Kemp to succeed Forbes as leader of the Labour group in March 2022, although Forbes remained council leader until after the election. Labour councillor Jeremy Beecham retired from the council in March 2022. His Benwell and Scotswood seat was therefore contested alongside the ward's seat due in the ordinary election.

== Electoral process ==
The council elects its councillors in thirds, with a third being up for election every year for three years, with no election in the fourth year. The election took place by first-past-the-post voting, with wards generally represented by three councillors and one elected in each election year to serve a four-year term. All registered electors (British, Irish, Commonwealth and European Union citizens) living in Newcastle aged 18 or over were entitled to vote in the election. People who lived at two addresses in different council areas, such as university students with different term-time and holiday addresses, could be registered for and vote in elections in both local authorities. Voting in person at polling stations took place from 07:00 to 22:00 on election day, with postal and proxy voting also available.

== Previous council composition ==
After 2021 election		Before 2022 election	
Party	Seats	Party	Seats
Labour	52	Labour	50
Liberal Democrats	20	Liberal Democrats	20
Independent	3	Independent	4
Newcastle Ind.	3	Newcastle Ind.	3

== Results summary ==
2022 Newcastle City Council election
Party	This election				Full council			This election		
Party	Candidates	Seats	Net	Seats %	Other	Total	Total %	Votes	Votes %	+/−
Labour	{{{candidates}}}	19	▼1	70.4	32	51	65.4	31,264	44.1	+4.9
Liberal Democrats	{{{candidates}}}	7	▲1	25.9	14	21	26.9	16,556	23.4	+3.9
Newcastle Ind.	{{{candidates}}}	0	Steady	0.0	3	3	3.8	4,062	5.7	-1.1
Independent	{{{candidates}}}	1	Steady	3.7	2	3	3.8	3,434	4.8	-2.2
Conservative	{{{candidates}}}	0	Steady	0.0	0	0	0.0	9,552	13.5	-4.1
Green	{{{candidates}}}	0	Steady	0.0	0	0	0.0	5,525	7.8	-1.3
NIP	{{{candidates}}}	0	Steady	0.0	0	0	0.0	227	0.3	N/A
Communist	{{{candidates}}}	0	Steady	0.0	0	0	0.0	66	0.1	±0.0
Freedom Alliance	{{{candidates}}}	0	Steady	0.0	0	0	0.0	65	0.1	N/A
North East	{{{candidates}}}	0	Steady	0.0	0	0	0.0	56	0.1	±0.0
Reform	{{{candidates}}}	0	Steady	0.0	0	0	0.0	28	<0.1	-0.3

== Ward results ==
=== Arthur's Hill ===
Arthur's Hill
Party	Candidate	Votes	%	±%
Labour	Abdul Samad	915	67.3	▼11.1
Green	Tom Registe	152	11.2	▼1.1
Conservative	Maggie Birkmyre	126	9.3	▲2.5
Newcastle Ind.	Joseph Eldridge	122	9.0	New
Liberal Democrats	Tahir Siddique	44	3.2	▼0.7
Majority		763	56.1	▼10.0
Turnout		1,359	23.1	▼11.5
Registered electors		5,943		
Labour hold		Swing	▼5.0	

=== Benwell and Scotswood ===
Benwell and Scotswood (2 seats)
Party	Candidate	Votes	%	±%
Labour	Hazel Stephenson	1,687	61.6	▲3.9
Labour	Susan Anthony	1,492	54.5	▼3.2
Conservative	Connor Shotton	640	23.4	▼3.5
Conservative	Kenneth Wake	444	16.2	▼10.7
Newcastle Ind.	John Gordon	295	10.8	▲2.5
Green	Tony Roberts	251	9.2	▲5.4
Liberal Democrats	Hans-Christian Andersen	172	6.3	▲3.0
Liberal Democrats	Richard Scholfield	154	5.6	▲2.3
Turnout		2,740	33.8	▼4.7
Registered electors		8,129		
Labour hold				
Labour hold				

Two seats were contested in Benwell and Scotswood: the seat due in the ordinary election and the casual vacancy caused by Jeremy Beecham's retirement.

=== Blakelaw ===
Blakelaw
Party	Candidate	Votes	%	±%
Labour	Juna Sathian	1,227	59.9	▼0.6
Newcastle Ind.	Annie Hunter	479	23.4	New
Conservative	Simon Bell	267	13.0	▼3.5
Liberal Democrats	Hamed Aghajani	75	3.7	▼12.2
Majority		748	36.5	▼7.5
Turnout		2,048	29.1	▲0.4
Registered electors		7,053		
Labour hold		Swing	▼12.0	

=== Byker ===
Byker
Party	Candidate	Votes	%	±%
Labour	Stephen Sheraton	1,241	65.0	▼4.9
Conservative	Richard Tulip	286	15.0	▲6.0
Green	Phill James	274	14.4	▲3.5
Liberal Democrats	Stephen Psallidas	108	5.7	▼0.2
Majority		955	50.0	▼9.0
Turnout		1,909	27.4	▼4.4
Registered electors		7,020		
Labour hold		Swing	▼5.5	

=== Callerton and Throckley ===
Callerton and Throckley
Party	Candidate	Votes	%	±%
Labour	Steve Fairlie	1,159	44.6	▼9.4
Newcastle Ind.	Sarah Armstrong	579	22.3	▲6.4
Conservative	John Dobie	498	19.2	▼11.7
Green	Idwal John	248	9.5	New
Liberal Democrats	Richard Morris	115	4.4	▼4.6
Majority		580	22.3	▼0.8
Turnout		2,599	33.2	▼0.5
Registered electors		7,847		
Labour hold		Swing	▼7.9	

=== Castle ===
Castle
Party	Candidate	Votes	%	±%
Liberal Democrats	Thom Campion	1,866	53.1	▲8.2
Labour	Vince Barry-Stanners	963	27.4	▼1.5
Conservative	John Watts	433	12.3	▼3.5
Green	Andrew Thorp	186	5.3	▼2.4
Freedom Alliance	Jeanette Holmes	65	1.9	New
Majority		903	25.8	▲9.8
Turnout		3,513	34.4	▼3.7
Registered electors		10,248		
Liberal Democrats hold		Swing	▲4.9	

=== Chapel ===
Chapel
Party	Candidate	Votes	%	±%
Independent	Marc Donnelly	3,434	85.7	▲2.5
Labour	Oskar Avery	310	7.7	▼5.7
Conservative	Ian Forster	169	4.2	▼7.2
Green	James Milne	50	1.2	New
Liberal Democrats	Judith Steen	42	1.0	▼7.5
Majority		3,124	78.0	▲8.2
Turnout		4,005	53.6	▼3.6
Registered electors		7,494		
Independent hold		Swing	▲4.1	

=== Dene and South Gosforth ===
Dene and South Gosforth
Party	Candidate	Votes	%	±%
Liberal Democrats	Wendy Taylor	2,020	54.8	▲0.9
Labour	Nick Arnold	1074	29.1	▼5.4
Green	Alistair Ford	316	8.6	▼2.8
Conservative	Gerry Langley	275	7.5	▼2.3
Majority		946	25.7	▲6.3
Turnout		3,685	49.7	▼1.3
Registered electors		7,443		
Liberal Democrats hold		Swing	▲3.2	

=== Denton and Westerhope ===
Denton and Westerhope
Party	Candidate	Votes	%	±%
Labour	Dan Greenhough	1,384	47.6	▲4.5
Newcastle Ind.	Adam Mitchell	1132	38.9	▲5.4
Conservative	Alexis Fernandes	289	9.9	▲0.1
Liberal Democrats	Elizabeth Dicken	104	3.6	▼5.5
Majority		252	8.7	▼10.7
Turnout		2,909	33.9	▼2.0
Registered electors		8,612		
Labour hold		Swing	▼0.5	

=== Elswick ===
Elswick
Party	Candidate	Votes	%	±%
Labour	Miriam Mafemba	1,411	70.4	▼1.7
Conservative	Saamiya Malik	243	12.1	▲3.1
Green	Peter Thomson	212	10.6	▲0.4
Liberal Democrats	David Faulkner	137	6.8	▲1.7
Majority		1,168	58.3	▼3.6
Turnout		2,003	25.9	▼9.0
Registered electors		7,790		
Labour hold		Swing	▼2.4	

=== Fawdon and West Gosforth ===
Fawdon and West Gosforth
Party	Candidate	Votes	%	±%
Liberal Democrats	Brenda Hindmarsh	1,684	55.8	▼1.8
Labour	Michael Bell	771	25.5	▼3.4
Conservative	Stephen Axford	356	11.8	▲0.2
Green	Roger Whittaker	209	6.9	▼1.5
Majority		913	30.3	▲1.6
Turnout		3,020	41.4	▼4.1
Registered electors		7,323		
Liberal Democrats hold		Swing	▼0.8	

=== Gosforth ===
Gosforth
Party	Candidate	Votes	%	±%
Liberal Democrats	Colin Ferguson	1,588	38.8	▼4.4
Conservative	Doc Anand	1256	30.7	▲1.9
Labour	Milo Barnett	894	21.9	▼3.7
Green	Frances Hinton	296	7.2	▼5.7
North East	Brian Moore	56	1.4	New
Majority		332	8.1	▼6.3
Turnout		4,090	53.1	▲2.0
Registered electors		7,718		
Liberal Democrats hold		Swing	▼3.2	

=== Heaton ===
Heaton
Party	Candidate	Votes	%	±%
Labour	Lara Ellis	1,642	55.9	▲5.9
Green	Andrew Gray	545	18.5	▼13.4
Liberal Democrats	Fiona Punchard	477	16.2	▼5.9
Conservative	Dr Mel Bishop	209	7.1	▲1.1
Communist	Steve Handford	66	2.2	New
Majority		1,165	37.4	▲19.3
Turnout		2,939	38.4	▼2.3
Registered electors		7,678		
Labour hold		Swing	▲9.7	

=== Kenton ===
Kenton
Party	Candidate	Votes	%	±%
Labour	Ged Bell	1,553	62.7	▲6.3
Liberal Democrats	Robert Austin	469	18.9	▲2.2
Conservative	Iain Adams	454	18.3	▲1.7
Majority		1,084	43.8	▲4.1
Turnout		2,476	33.4	▼2.4
Registered electors		7,477		
Labour hold		Swing	▲2.1	

=== Kingston Park South and Newbiggin Hall ===
Kingston Park South and Newbiggin Hall
Party	Candidate	Votes	%	±%
Labour	George Pattison	1,428	66.3	▲8.1
Conservative	Leanne Conway-Wilcox	505	23.4	▲4.0
Liberal Democrats	Colin Steen	221	10.3	▼8.4
Majority		923	42.9	▲4.1
Turnout		2,154	30.6	▼4.6
Registered electors		7,090		
Labour hold		Swing	▲2.1	

=== Lemington ===
Lemington
Party	Candidate	Votes	%	±%
Labour	Barry Phillipson	1,207	47.4	▼8.0
Newcastle Ind.	Nix Joanne	1019	40.0	▲13.0
Conservative	Zak Mudie	181	7.1	▼5.1
Green	Kat Brennan	77	3.0	▼3.7
Liberal Democrats	Robert Petrie	64	2.5	▼3.6
Majority		188	7.4	▼21.0
Turnout		2,548	35.2	▼0.9
Registered electors		7,255		
Labour hold		Swing	▼10.5	

=== Manor Park ===
Manor Park
Party	Candidate	Votes	%	±%
Liberal Democrats	Doreen Huddart	1,586	52.1	▼1.3
Labour	Stephen Barry-Stanners	930	30.5	▼4.0
Conservative	Stephen Dawes	292	9.6	▲0.6
Green	Mike Rabley	237	7.8	▲3.0
Majority		656	21.6	▲2.7
Turnout		3,045	42.9	▼3.8
Registered electors		7,121		
Liberal Democrats hold		Swing	▼1.4	

=== Monument ===
Monument
Party	Candidate	Votes	%	±%
Labour	Jane Byrne	839	65.3	▼1.5
Green	Ian Appleby	205	16.0	▼2.7
Conservative	William Hayes	121	9.4	▼5.5
Liberal Democrats	David Partington	120	9.3	▼1.1
Majority		634	49.3	▲1.2
Turnout		1,285	20.4	▼5.8
Registered electors		6,333		
Labour hold		Swing	▼0.6	

=== North Jesmond ===
North Jesmond
Party	Candidate	Votes	%	±%
Labour	Stella Postlethwaite	885	43.2	▼2.2
Liberal Democrats	Philip Browne	845	41.3	▲0.6
Green	Shehla Naqvi	151	7.4	▼5.6
Conservative	Aaron Whelan Harvey	138	6.7	▼7.3
Reform	Dom Eiben	28	1.4	New
Majority		40	1.9	▼2.8
Turnout		2,047	35.4	▼2.0
Registered electors		5,798		
Labour hold		Swing	▼1.4	

=== Ouseburn ===
Ouseburn
Party	Candidate	Votes	%	±%
Liberal Democrats	Mike Cookson	856	44.2	▼2.1
Labour	Paula Holland	831	42.9	▼8.7
Green	Nick Hartley	198	10.2	▼3.8
Conservative	Alex Wang-Evans	52	2.7	▼2.3
Majority		25	1.3	▼4.0
Turnout		1,946	28.4	▼7.6
Registered electors		6,864		
Liberal Democrats gain from Labour		Swing	▲3.3	

=== Parklands ===
Parklands
Party	Candidate	Votes	%	±%
Liberal Democrats	Robin Ashby	2,085	49.3	▲2.8
Labour	Christopher Bartlett	825	19.5	▼3.4
Conservative	Andrew Burnett	508	12.0	▼10.3
Newcastle Ind.	John Hall	436	10.3	New
Green	Audrey Macnaughton	371	8.8	▼1.5
Majority		1,260	29.8	▲6.2
Turnout		4,225	47.3	▼4.1
Registered electors		8,967		
Liberal Democrats hold		Swing	▲3.1	

=== South Jesmond ===
South Jesmond
Party	Candidate	Votes	%	±%
Labour	Laura Cummings	1,078	58.8	▲1.1
Conservative	Joshua Clark	265	14.5	▼1.9
Green	Tim Dowson	241	13.2	▼3.6
Liberal Democrats	Tom Appleby	236	12.9	▼4.6
Majority		813	44.3	▲4.1
Turnout		1,832	29.7	▲1.3
Registered electors		6,169		
Labour hold		Swing	▲1.5	

=== Walker ===
Walker
Party	Candidate	Votes	%	±%
Labour	John Stokel-Walker	1,380	71.8	▼0.9
Conservative	Marie Summersby	290	15.1	▲4.4
Green	Tom Whatson	130	6.8	▲0.2
Liberal Democrats	Bill Shepherd	123	6.4	▲1.1
Majority		1,090	56.7	▼5.3
Turnout		1,923	26.8	▼3.8
Registered electors		7,208		
Labour hold		Swing	▲2.7	

=== Walkergate ===
Walkergate
Party	Candidate	Votes	%	±%
Labour	Stephen Wood	1,668	60.6	▲1.2
Liberal Democrats	Deborah Gallagher	482	17.5	▼0.8
Conservative	Stephen Oxborough	438	15.9	▲3.6
Green	Doug Paterson	163	5.9	▼1.8
Majority		1,186	43.1	▲2.0
Turnout		2,751	32.7	▼4.0
Registered electors		8,458		
Labour hold		Swing	▲1.0	

=== West Fenham ===
West Fenham
Party	Candidate	Votes	%	±%
Labour	Karen Kilgour	923	31.4	▼28.7
Liberal Democrats	PJ Morrissey	725	24.6	▲14.6
Green	Tay Pitman	681	23.1	▲15.1
Conservative	Raja Khan	552	18.8	▲4.3
NIP	Andrew Ehala	61	2.1	New
Majority		198	6.8	▼38.8
Turnout		2,942	40.0	▲4.6
Registered electors		7,394		
Labour hold		Swing	▼21.7	

=== Wingrove ===
Wingrove
Party	Candidate	Votes	%	±%
Labour	Joyce McCarty	1,547	62.7	▼5.5
Green	John Pearson	332	13.5	▲2.4
Conservative	Shabs Mohammed	265	10.7	▼1.6
NIP	David Stewart	166	6.7	New
Liberal Democrats	Kami Kundi	158	6.4	▼5.6
Majority		1,215	49.2	▼6.7
Turnout		2,468	33.3	▼8.1
Registered electors		7,441		
Labour hold		Swing	▼4.0	

== Changes between 2022 and 2023 ==
- Late March 2022: Joyce McCarty, councillor for Wingrove, was administratively suspended from the Labour Party pending an investigation into text messages alleging a "Muslim plot" behind Nick Forbes' deselection, and began sitting as an independent; Labour withdrew its endorsement of her candidacy for the 2022 election, though she remained on the ballot as her nomination had been submitted before the suspension. On 29 July 2022, the Labour Party's Governance and Legal Unit concluded its investigation, finding McCarty guilty of Islamophobia and confirming a twelve-month ban from the party.
- 25 May 2022: Nick Kemp was elected leader of the council, succeeding Nick Forbes.
- January 2023: Stephen Sheraton, Labour councillor for Byker, resigned on health grounds. A by-election was held on 2 March 2023.
- February 2023: Graham Middleton, an independent councillor for Chapel, resigned. Because his term was due to expire in May, the vacancy was left to be filled at the ordinary election.
- February 2023: Kyle Webster, councillor for Lemington, resigned from the Labour Party and sat as an independent for the remainder of his term.
- March 2023: Stella Postlethwaite, Labour councillor for North Jesmond, resigned. Her vacancy was filled alongside the ward's ordinary seat at the 2023 election.

=== By-elections ===
==== Byker ====
The by-election followed the resignation of Labour councillor Stephen Sheraton on health grounds.

Byker by-election, 2 March 2023
Party	Candidate	Votes	%	±%
Labour	Hayder Qureshi	591	46.9	▼18.1
Green	Nick Hartley	375	29.7	▲15.3
Liberal Democrats	Mark Ridyard	188	14.9	▲9.2
Conservative	Aaron Whelan Harvey	107	8.5	▼6.5
Majority		216	17.2	▼32.8
Turnout		1,261	19.2	▼8.2
Registered electors		6,568		
Labour hold		Swing	▼16.7	
