= 2021 Newcastle City Council election =

2021 UK local government election

- 6 May 2021

28 out of 78 seats to Newcastle City Council 40 seats needed for a majority
- Turnout: 38.6%
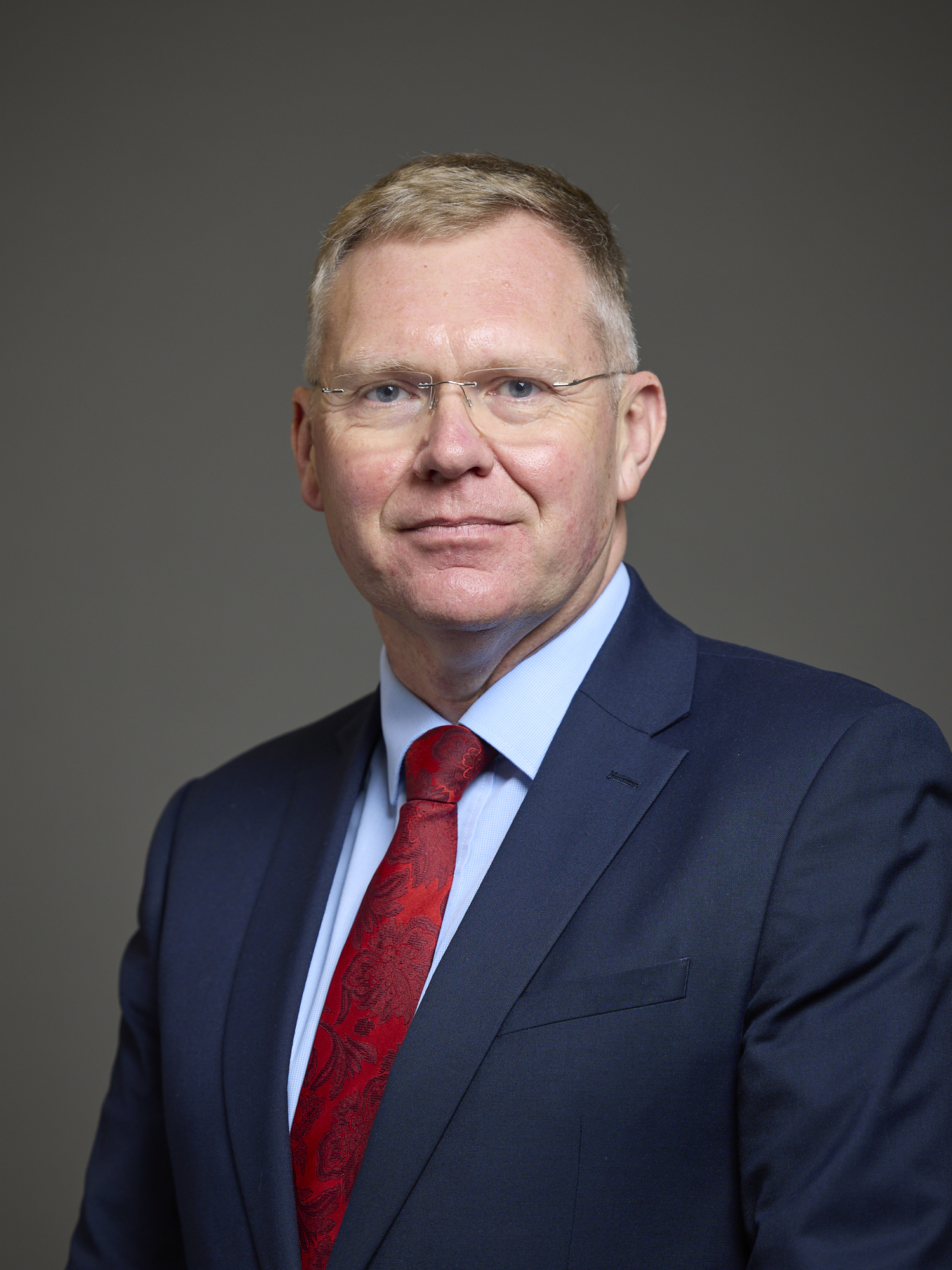
	First party	Second party
Leader	Nick Forbes	Nick Cott
Party	Labour	Liberal Democrats
Leader's seat	Arthur's Hill	Fawdon & West Gosforth
Last election	54 seats, 38.4%	20 seats, 23.3%
Seats before	50	20
Seats won	18	6
Seats after	52	20
Seat change	▼2	Steady
Popular vote	31,471	15,673
Percentage	39.2%	19.5%
Swing	▲0.8%	▼3.8%
	Third party	Fourth party
Leader	N/A	Jason Smith
Party	Independent	Newcastle Ind.
Last election	3 seats, 6.2%	1 seat, 5.1%
Seats before	2	1
Seats won	2	2
Seats after	3	3
Seat change	Steady	▲2
Popular vote	5,628	5,498
Percentage	7.0%	6.8%
Swing	▲0.8%	▲1.7%
- Winner of each seat at the 2021 Newcastle City Council election
Council control before election
Nick Forbes
Labour
Council control after election
Nick Forbes
Labour

The 2021 Newcastle City Council election took place on 6 May 2021 to elect members of Newcastle City Council in England. This was on the same day as other local elections across the United Kingdom.

Twenty-eight seats were contested: the 26 seats forming the ordinary election, plus casual vacancies in Byker and Chapel. The additional Byker seat followed the death of Labour councillor George Allison in March 2020, while the additional Chapel seat followed the resignation of independent councillor Sandra Davison in March 2021. Both vacancies were contested as part of the ordinary election poll rather than in separate standalone by-elections.

In the previous council election in 2019, the Labour Party maintained its control of the council, holding 54 seats after the election. There were twenty Liberal Democrat councillors, three independent councillors and one Newcastle Independent councillor.

== Background ==
=== History ===
The Local Government Act 1972 created a two-tier system of metropolitan counties and districts covering Greater Manchester, Merseyside, South Yorkshire, Tyne and Wear, the West Midlands, and West Yorkshire starting in 1974. Newcastle was a district of the Tyne and Wear metropolitan county. The Local Government Act 1985 abolished the metropolitan counties, with metropolitan districts taking on most of their powers as metropolitan boroughs. The North of Tyne Combined Authority was created in 2018 and began electing the mayor of the North of Tyne from 2019, which was given strategic powers covering a region covering some of the same area as the former Tyne and Wear metropolitan county, as well as Northumberland.

Since its creation, Newcastle has variously been under Labour, Liberal Democrat and Conservative control. The Liberal Democrats held a majority of seats on the council from 2004 until 2011, when Labour gained enough seats to control the council. Nick Forbes became leader of the council. Labour continued to gain seats until the 2019 election, when the party lost two seats but continued to have an overall majority.

The Local Government Boundary Commission for England produced new boundaries for Newcastle ahead of the 2018 election, meaning that the 2018 elections were all-out, with all councillors being elected before returning to electing by thirds. Candidates up for re-election in 2021 were those who came second in each ward in 2018.

== Results summary ==
2021 Newcastle City Council election
Party	This election				Full council			This election		
Party	Candidates	Seats	Net	Seats %	Other	Total	Total %	Votes	Votes %	+/−
Labour	{{{candidates}}}	18	▼2	64.3	34	52	66.7	31,471	39.2	+0.8
Liberal Democrats	{{{candidates}}}	6	Steady	21.4	14	20	25.6	15,673	19.5	-3.8
Independent	{{{candidates}}}	2	Steady	7.1	1	3	3.8	5,628	7.0	+0.8
Newcastle Ind.	{{{candidates}}}	2	▲2	7.1	1	3	3.8	5,498	6.8	+1.7
Conservative	{{{candidates}}}	0	Steady	0.0	0	0	0.0	14,164	17.6	+5.7
Green	{{{candidates}}}	0	Steady	0.0	0	0	0.0	7,323	9.1	+0.2
Reform	{{{candidates}}}	0	Steady	0.0	0	0	0.0	232	0.3	New
For Britain	{{{candidates}}}	0	Steady	0.0	0	0	0.0	129	0.2	New
Communist	{{{candidates}}}	0	Steady	0.0	0	0	0.0	99	0.1	+0.1
TUSC	{{{candidates}}}	0	Steady	0.0	0	0	0.0	85	0.1	New
North East	{{{candidates}}}	0	Steady	0.0	0	0	0.0	72	0.1	-0.3

== Ward results ==
=== Arthur's Hill ===
Arthur's Hill
Party	Candidate	Votes	%	±%
Labour	Stephen Powers	1,031	67.6	−2.4
Conservative	Maggie Birkmyre	188	12.3	+4.9
Green	Shehla Naqvi	123	8.1	−1.8
Newcastle Ind.	Joseph Eldridge	110	7.2	−0.2
Liberal Democrats	Tahir Siddique	58	3.8	−0.3
TUSC	Daniel Gilmore	16	1.0	New
Majority		843	55.2	
Turnout		1,526	27.5	
Registered electors		5,541		
Labour hold		Swing		

=== Benwell and Scotswood ===
Benwell and Scotswood
Party	Candidate	Votes	%	±%
Labour	Rob Higgins	1,799	57.7	+7.2
Conservative	Connor Shotton	837	26.9	+17.7
Newcastle Ind.	John Gordon	259	8.3	−4.5
Green	Tony Roberts	117	3.8	−1.2
Liberal Democrats	Hans Andersen	104	3.3	−1.9
Majority		962	30.9	
Turnout		3,116	38.5	
Registered electors		8,101		
Labour hold		Swing		

=== Blakelaw ===
Blakelaw
Party	Candidate	Votes	%	±%
Labour	Marion Williams	1,051	48.8	−2.2
Newcastle Ind.	Annie Hunter	474	22.0	New
Conservative	Liam Kinchley	420	19.5	+10.1
Green	Alistair Ford	130	6.0	−0.3
Liberal Democrats	Hamed Aghajani	78	3.6	−8.7
Majority		577	26.8	
Turnout		2,153	31.0	
Registered electors		6,939		
Labour hold		Swing		

=== Byker ===
Byker (2 seats)
Party	Candidate	Votes	%	±%
Labour	Veronica Dunn	1,175	59.4	+4.7
Labour	Stephen Sheraton	1,170	59.2	+4.5
Conservative	John Watts	450	22.8	+17.7
Conservative	Richard Tulip	406	20.5	+15.4
Green	Nick Hartley	297	15.0	+5.4
Green	Phillip James	264	13.4	+3.8
Liberal Democrats	Stephen Psallidas	107	5.4	+1.3
Liberal Democrats	Richard Scholfield	86	4.4	+0.3
Majority		720	36.4	
Turnout		1,977	28.3	
Registered electors		6,983		
Labour hold		Swing		
Labour hold		Swing		

Two seats were contested in Byker: the seat due for election in the ordinary cycle and the casual vacancy caused by the death of Labour councillor George Allison in March 2020.

=== Callerton and Throckley ===
Callerton and Throckley
Party	Candidate	Votes	%	±%
Labour	Linda Wright	1,292	43.8	+14.5
Newcastle Ind.	Adam Mitchell	667	22.6	−11.5
Conservative	John Dobie	561	19.0	+3.4
Green	Idwal John	322	10.9	−0.8
Liberal Democrats	Aleisha Stansfield	108	3.7	−8.0
Majority		625	21.2	
Turnout		2,950	39.3	
Registered electors		7,508		
Labour hold		Swing		

=== Castle ===
Castle
Party	Candidate	Votes	%	±%
Liberal Democrats	Helen Laverick	1,522	41.1	+7.0
Labour	Andrew Herridge	1,026	27.7	−2.0
Conservative	Elizabeth Yewdall	731	19.7	+7.3
Independent	Rachel Locke	230	6.2	−1.3
Green	Andrew Thorp	197	5.3	−0.6
Majority		496	13.4	
Turnout		3,706	37.6	
Registered electors		9,862		
Liberal Democrats hold		Swing		

=== Chapel ===
Chapel (2 seats)
Party	Candidate	Votes	%	±%
Independent	Lawrence Hunter	2,631	70.0	+5.1
Independent	Graham Middleton	2,566	68.2	+3.4
Conservative	Andrew Burnett	615	16.4	+8.0
Labour	Jamie Dickinson	555	14.8	+1.0
Labour	Sam Grist	441	11.7	−2.1
Conservative	Ian Forster	439	11.7	+3.3
Green	James Milne	107	2.8	New
Liberal Democrats	Judith Steen	83	2.2	+0.3
Liberal Democrats	David Partington	82	2.2	+0.3
Majority		1,951	51.9	
Turnout		3,760	50.2	
Registered electors		7,483		
Independent hold				
Independent hold				

Two seats were contested in Chapel: the seat due for election in the ordinary cycle and the casual vacancy caused by the resignation of independent councillor Sandra Davison in March 2021.

=== Dene and South Gosforth ===
Dene and South Gosforth
Party	Candidate	Votes	%	±%
Liberal Democrats	Karen Robinson	1,777	45.1	+0.2
Labour	Nick Arnold	1,177	29.9	+1.9
Green	Anna Foster	509	12.9	−0.7
Conservative	Gerry Langley	475	12.1	+4.5
Majority		600	15.2	
Turnout		3,938	52.0	
Registered electors		7,568		
Liberal Democrats hold		Swing		

=== Denton and Westerhope ===
Denton and Westerhope
Party	Candidate	Votes	%	±%
Newcastle Ind.	Tracey Mitchell	1,493	46.5	+14.4
Labour	Arlene Ainsley	1,075	33.4	−3.0
Conservative	Simon Bell	498	15.5	+8.8
Liberal Democrats	Elizabeth Dicken	75	2.3	−0.7
Green	Tom Registe	73	2.3	New
Majority		418	13.0	
Turnout		3,214	36.9	
Registered electors		8,709		
Newcastle Ind. gain from Labour		Swing		

=== Elswick ===
Elswick
Party	Candidate	Votes	%	±%
Labour	Nicu Ion	1,599	66.0	−6.0
Conservative	Saamiya Malik	436	18.0	+8.6
Green	Peter Thomson	234	9.7	−1.6
Liberal Democrats	David Faulkner	153	6.3	−1.0
Majority		1,163	48.0	
Turnout		2,422	32.1	
Registered electors		7,543		
Labour hold		Swing		

=== Fawdon and West Gosforth ===
Fawdon and West Gosforth
Party	Candidate	Votes	%	±%
Liberal Democrats	Nick Cott	1,648	49.6	−8.7
Labour	Gordana Vasic Franklin	856	25.8	+3.4
Conservative	Stephen Axford	608	18.3	+8.7
Green	Roger Whittaker	211	6.3	−3.5
Majority		792	23.8	
Turnout		3,323	44.9	
Registered electors		7,401		
Liberal Democrats hold		Swing		

=== Gosforth ===
Gosforth
Party	Candidate	Votes	%	±%
Liberal Democrats	Phil Hall	1,473	34.5	−6.2
Conservative	Anandavardhan Anand	1,150	26.9	+0.6
Labour	Isra Mohammed	1,016	23.8	+3.9
Green	Frances Hinton	434	10.2	−2.9
Independent	James Sheerin	201	4.7	New
Majority		323	7.6	
Turnout		4,274	54.8	
Registered electors		7,804		
Liberal Democrats hold		Swing		

=== Heaton ===
Heaton
Party	Candidate	Votes	%	±%
Labour	Clare Penny-Evans	1,592	49.1	+2.8
Green	Andrew Gray	658	20.3	−7.4
Liberal Democrats	Fiona Punchard	602	18.6	+0.9
Conservative	Hamish John	294	9.1	+0.8
Communist	Steve Handford	99	3.1	New
Majority		934	28.8	
Turnout		3,245	41.6	
Registered electors		7,807		
Labour hold		Swing		

=== Kenton ===
Kenton
Party	Candidate	Votes	%	±%
Labour	Stephen Lambert	1,461	53.1	+4.6
Conservative	Alison Wake	595	21.6	+4.8
Liberal Democrats	Robert Austin	403	14.7	−9.6
Green	Joanna Jenkinson	221	8.0	New
TUSC	Oisin Gourley	69	2.5	−7.9
Majority		866	31.5	
Turnout		2,749	36.8	
Registered electors		7,480		
Labour hold		Swing		

=== Kingston Park South and Newbiggin Hall ===
Kingston Park South and Newbiggin Hall
Party	Candidate	Votes	%	±%
Labour	Alexander Hay	1,239	49.8	−6.4
Conservative	Leanne Conway-Wilcox	815	32.7	+3.4
Newcastle Ind.	Rochelle Monte	217	8.7	New
Liberal Democrats	Colin Steen	121	4.9	−9.6
Green	Mark Copsey	98	3.9	New
Majority		424	17.0	
Turnout		2,490	34.8	
Registered electors		7,152		
Labour hold		Swing		

=== Lemington ===
Lemington
Party	Candidate	Votes	%	±%
Newcastle Ind.	Jason Smith	1,442	48.5	+11.3
Labour	Lu Thompson	997	33.5	−8.1
Conservative	Alexis Fernandes	400	13.4	+2.9
Green	Jess Maiden	79	2.7	−2.7
Liberal Democrats	Robert Petrie	56	1.9	−3.4
Majority		445	15.0	
Turnout		2,974	41.0	
Registered electors		7,259		
Newcastle Ind. gain from Labour		Swing		

=== Manor Park ===
Manor Park
Party	Candidate	Votes	%	±%
Liberal Democrats	Greg Stone	1,849	53.7	−3.3
Labour Co-op	Stephen Stanners	860	25.0	−8.0
Conservative	Stephen Dawes	411	11.9	+1.9
Green	Mike Rabley	274	8.0	New
Reform	Barry Fowler	52	1.5	New
Majority		989	28.7	
Turnout		3,446	47.5	
Registered electors		7,254		
Liberal Democrats hold		Swing		

=== Monument ===
Monument
Party	Candidate	Votes	%	±%
Labour	Shumel Rahman	802	55.3	+17.9
Conservative	William Hayes	275	19.0	+5.3
Green	Dana Abi Ghanem	243	16.8	−11.8
Liberal Democrats	Thom Campion	129	8.9	−9.0
Majority		527	36.4	
Turnout		1,449	24.2	
Registered electors		5,985		
Labour hold		Swing		

=== North Jesmond ===
North Jesmond
Party	Candidate	Votes	%	±%
Labour	Tanya Pretswell	850	38.4	+10.0
Liberal Democrats	Deborah Burns	800	36.1	−14.0
Green	Robert Taylor	319	14.4	+1.3
Conservative	Melissa-Jane Pearson	245	11.1	+2.7
Majority		50	2.3	
Turnout		2,214	35.0	
Registered electors		6,325		
Labour hold		Swing		

=== Ouseburn ===
Ouseburn
Party	Candidate	Votes	%	±%
Labour Co-op	Alistair Chisholm	952	44.1	+6.5
Liberal Democrats	Stephen Howse	899	41.6	−8.1
Green	Daryl Hughes	216	10.0	+0.5
Conservative	Alexander Wang-Evans	92	4.3	+1.1
Majority		53	2.5	
Turnout		2,159	31.7	
Registered electors		6,802		
Labour hold		Swing		

=== Parklands ===
Parklands
Party	Candidate	Votes	%	±%
Liberal Democrats	Pauline Allen	1,927	41.9	+3.0
Conservative	Stephen Yewdall	848	18.4	−0.3
Labour	Abdul Samad	725	15.8	−0.2
Newcastle Ind.	John Hall	663	14.4	+2.0
Green	Audrey Macnaughton	439	9.5	+1.1
Majority		1,079	23.4	
Turnout		4,602	51.0	
Registered electors		9,025		
Liberal Democrats hold		Swing		

=== South Jesmond ===
South Jesmond
Party	Candidate	Votes	%	±%
Labour	Charlie Gray	1,062	49.2	+12.3
Conservative	Olly Scargill	393	18.2	+2.6
Green	Tim Dowson	344	15.9	−10.7
Liberal Democrats	Tom Appleby	252	11.7	−7.9
North East	Brian Moore	72	3.3	New
Reform	Martin Evison	36	1.7	New
Majority		669	31.0	
Turnout		2,159	33.5	
Registered electors		6,443		
Labour hold		Swing		

=== Walker ===
Walker
Party	Candidate	Votes	%	±%
Labour	David Wood	1,461	66.0	+12.5
Conservative	Marie Marron	504	22.8	+15.4
Green	Rakesh Prashara	90	4.1	New
Liberal Democrats	William Shepherd	81	3.7	−3.4
For Britain	Tim Marron	77	3.5	New
Majority		957	43.2	
Turnout		2,213	30.6	
Registered electors		7,223		
Labour hold		Swing		

=== Walkergate ===
Walkergate
Party	Candidate	Votes	%	±%
Labour	Maureen Lowson	1,608	51.7	+7.4
Conservative	Stephen Oxborough	673	21.7	+12.2
Liberal Democrats	Deborah Gallagher	470	15.1	+0.1
Green	Jess Hamer	161	5.2	−1.1
Reform	Michael Harrigan	144	4.6	New
For Britain	Sharon Young	52	1.7	New
Majority		935	30.1	
Turnout		3,108	36.7	
Registered electors		8,477		
Labour hold		Swing		

=== West Fenham ===
West Fenham
Party	Candidate	Votes	%	±%
Labour Co-op	Ian Tokell	947	34.2	−9.9
Green	Tay Pitman	647	23.3	+12.1
Liberal Democrats	PJ Morrissey	587	21.2	+15.5
Conservative	Kenneth Wake	419	15.1	+5.1
Newcastle Ind.	Sarah Armstrong	173	6.2	−1.8
Majority		300	10.8	
Turnout		2,773	37.9	
Registered electors		7,316		
Labour hold		Swing		

=== Wingrove ===
Wingrove
Party	Candidate	Votes	%	±%
Labour	Irim Ali	1,652	61.3	+5.3
Green	John Pearson	516	19.1	+5.9
Conservative	Shabs Mohammed	386	14.3	+4.2
Liberal Democrats	Kami Kundi	143	5.3	−6.5
Majority		1,136	42.1	
Turnout		2,697	36.1	
Registered electors		7,472		
Labour hold		Swing		

== Changes 2021–2022 ==
- Following the election, Nick Forbes defeated a leadership challenge from Nick Kemp by 30 votes to 22 and remained leader of the Labour group. Karen Kilgour defeated Joyce McCarty by 28 votes to 24 to become deputy leader.
- In March 2022, Kemp was elected Labour group leader after Forbes was not reselected as a candidate for the 2022 election. Forbes remained leader of the council until after the election.
- Later in March 2022, Labour councillor Jeremy Beecham retired as a councillor for Benwell and Scotswood after 55 years on the council.
- Labour councillor Oskar Avery also resigned his Blakelaw seat in March 2022. He subsequently stood unsuccessfully in Chapel at the 2022 election.
- At the end of March 2022, Labour councillor Joyce McCarty (Wingrove) was suspended by the party pending an investigation. Because her nomination papers had already been submitted, she remained listed as a Labour candidate at the 2022 election.

=== By-elections ===
==== Castle ====
The by-election was triggered by the death of Liberal Democrat councillor Anita Lower in July 2021.

Castle by-election, 9 September 2021
Party	Candidate	Votes	%	±%
Liberal Democrats	Thom Campion	1,306	42.5	+1.4
Labour	Andrew Herridge	773	25.1	−2.6
Conservative	John Watts	657	21.4	+1.7
Green	Andrew Thorp	250	8.1	+2.8
North East	Brian Moore	89	2.9	New
Majority		533	17.4	
Turnout		3,075	31.1	
Liberal Democrats hold		Swing	+2.0	
