= 2023 Newcastle City Council election =

2023 UK local government election

- 4 May 2023

27 out of 78 seats to Newcastle City Council 40 seats needed for a majority
	First party	Second party
Leader	Nick Kemp	Colin Ferguson
Party	Labour	Liberal Democrats
Leader's seat	Byker	Gosforth
Last election	51 seats, 44.1%	21 seats, 23.4%
Seats before	49	21
Seats won	14	10
Seats after	48	23
Seat change	▼3	▲2
Popular vote	27,688	18,417
Percentage	41.7%	27.8%
Swing	▼2.4%	▲4.4%
	Third party	Fourth party
Leader	Tracey Mitchell	N/A
Party	Newcastle Ind.	Independents
Last election	3 seats, 5.7%	3 seats, 4.8%
Seats before	3	3
Seats won	2	1
Seats after	4	3
Seat change	▲1	Steady
Popular vote	3,139	2,766
Percentage	4.7%	4.2%
Swing	▼1.0%	▼0.6%
- Winner of each seat at the 2023 Newcastle City Council election
Council control before election
Nick Kemp
Labour
Council control after election
Nick Kemp
Labour

The 2023 Newcastle City Council election took place on 4 May 2023 to elect one third of the members of Newcastle City Council in Tyne & Wear, England. This was on the same day as other local elections in England and Wales.

There were 27 of the 78 seats on the council up for election, being the usual third of the council plus a by-election in the North Jesmond ward. The result saw the Labour Party lose three seats with the Liberal Democrats and Newcastle Independents making gains. Labour retained its majority on the council.

== Background ==
The Labour Party has historically been dominant in Newcastle. Labour controlled the council from its creation in 1973 until 2004, when the Liberal Democrats won a majority on the council. Labour retook control in 2011, and have maintained a majority at every subsequent election.

Until 2022, the Labour council was led by Nick Forbes, who was also the Leader of the Labour group of the Local Government Association. The election marked the end of the first year of Nick Kemp's leadership of Newcastle City Council and as leader of the Labour group.

The seats up for election in 2023 were last contested in 2019.

This was the first election for Colin Ferguson as leader of the Liberal Democrats group, who took over from Nick Cott, and Tracey Mitchell as leader of the Newcastle Independents, who had taken over from Jason Smith.

== Election result ==
Despite losing three seats, the council remained under Labour majority control. Labour made a net loss of three seats.

Five seats changed hands at this election. The Liberal Democrats gained seats in North Jesmond and West Fenham from Labour. The Newcastle Independents gained two seats from Labour, the Denton and Westerhope ward and the Lemington ward. Despite losing three seats elsewhere on the council, Labour took the seat of Callerton and Throckley from the Newcastle Independents.

Nick Kemp faced a challenge for the council leadership from fellow Labour councillor Ged Bell. Bell had served as a councillor since 1996 and was a member of the council's cabinet under Nick Forbes. The challenge was withdrawn, leaving Kemp to return unopposed as leader of the Labour group.

2023 Newcastle City Council election
Party	This election				Full council			This election		
Party	Candidates	Seats	Net	Seats %	Other	Total	Total %	Votes	Votes %	+/−
Labour	{{{candidates}}}	14	▼3	51.9	34	48	61.5	27,688	41.7	-2.4
Liberal Democrats	{{{candidates}}}	10	▲2	37.0	13	23	29.5	18,417	27.8	+4.4
Newcastle Ind.	{{{candidates}}}	2	▲1	7.4	2	4	5.1	3,139	4.7	-1.0
Independent	{{{candidates}}}	1	Steady	3.7	2	3	3.8	2,766	4.2	-0.6
Conservative	{{{candidates}}}	0	Steady	0.0	0	0	0.0	7,661	11.5	-2.0
Green	{{{candidates}}}	0	Steady	0.0	0	0	0.0	6,233	9.4	+1.6
Freedom Alliance	{{{candidates}}}	0	Steady	0.0	0	0	0.0	235	0.4	+0.3
SDP	{{{candidates}}}	0	Steady	0.0	0	0	0.0	85	0.1	N/A
TUSC	{{{candidates}}}	0	Steady	0.0	0	0	0.0	71	0.1	N/A
Communist	{{{candidates}}}	0	Steady	0.0	0	0	0.0	65	0.1	±0.0

== Ward results ==
The Statement of Persons Nominated, which details the candidates standing in each ward, was released by Newcastle City Council following the close of nominations on 4 April 2023.

=== Arthur's Hill ===
Arthur's Hill
Party	Candidate	Votes	%	±%
Labour Co-op	Joanne Kingsland*	833	69.1	−0.9
Green	Katie Fletcher	208	17.2	+7.3
Conservative	Fahim Habibi	107	8.9	+1.5
Liberal Democrats	Tahir Siddique	58	4.8	+0.7
Majority		625	51.8	▼8.3
Turnout		1,206	23.5	▼6.0
Rejected ballots		10	0.82	
Registered electors		5,128		
Labour hold		Swing	▼4.1	

=== Benwell and Scotswood ===
Benwell and Scotswood
Party	Candidate	Votes	%	±%
Labour	Susan Anthony*	1,636	65.0	+14.5
Conservative	Jamie Kelly	475	18.9	+9.7
Liberal Democrats	Hans Christian Andersen	217	8.6	+3.4
Green	Lee Irving	189	7.5	+2.5
Majority		1,161	46.1	▲12.8
Turnout		2,517	31.2	▼1.8
Rejected ballots		7	0.28	
Registered electors		8,079		
Labour hold		Swing	▲2.4	

=== Blakelaw ===
Blakelaw
Party	Candidate	Votes	%	±%
Labour Co-op	Linda Hobson*	1,069	59.7	+8.7
Newcastle Ind.	Sarah Armstrong	295	16.5	New
Conservative	Lucy Howie	224	12.5	+3.1
Liberal Democrats	Bill Shepherd	121	6.8	−5.6
Green	Jessica Whitaker	82	4.6	−1.8
Majority		774	43.2	▲13.1
Turnout		1,791	26.1	▼1.6
Rejected ballots		5	0.28	
Registered electors		6,852		
Labour hold		Swing	▼3.9	

=== Byker ===
Byker
Party	Candidate	Votes	%	±%
Labour	Nicholas Kemp*	885	49.4	−5.3
Green	Nick Hartley	675	37.7	+28.1
Conservative	Jamie Hampton	127	7.1	+2.0
Liberal Democrats	Mark Ridyard	105	5.9	+1.8
Majority		210	11.7	▼26.3
Turnout		1,792	27.0	▼4.5
Rejected ballots		12	0.67	
Registered electors		6,644		
Labour hold		Swing	▼16.7	

=== Callerton and Throckley ===
Callerton and Throckley
Party	Candidate	Votes	%	±%
Labour	Adam Walker	1,080	41.7	+12.4
Newcastle Ind.	John Gordon	541	20.9	−13.2
Conservative	John Dobie	481	18.6	+2.9
Green	Idwal John	319	12.3	+0.6
Liberal Democrats	Richard Morris	169	6.5	−2.8
Majority		539	20.8	▲16.0
Turnout		2,590	30.6	▼2.8
Rejected ballots		14	0.54	
Registered electors		8,470		
Labour gain from Newcastle Ind.		Swing	▲12.8	

=== Castle ===
Castle
Party	Candidate	Votes	%	±%
Liberal Democrats	Ali Avaei*	1,369	43.2	+9.1
Labour Co-op	Andrew Herridge	1,175	37.1	+7.4
Conservative	Joshua Clark	406	12.8	+0.4
Green	Andrew Thorp	220	6.9	+1.0
Majority		194	6.1	▲1.7
Turnout		3,170	29.5	▼7.1
Rejected ballots		14	0.44	
Registered electors		10,750		
Liberal Democrats hold		Swing	▲0.9	

=== Chapel ===
Chapel
Party	Candidate	Votes	%	±%
Independent	Margaret Donnelly	2,766	78.8	+5.9
Labour Co-op	Milo Jasper Barnett	419	11.9	−3.6
Conservative	Ian Forster	203	5.8	−3.7
Green	James Milne	62	1.8	New
Liberal Democrats	Judith Steen	60	1.7	−0.5
Majority		2,347	66.9	▲15.9
Turnout		3,510	46.8	▼1.3
Rejected ballots		6	0.17	
Registered electors		7,499		
Independent hold		Swing	▲4.8	

=== Dene and South Gosforth ===
Dene and South Gosforth
Party	Candidate	Votes	%	±%
Liberal Democrats	Henry Gallagher*	1,659	48.2	+3.4
Labour	Christopher Bartlett	1,221	35.5	+7.5
Green	Robert Taylor	298	8.7	−4.9
Conservative	Gerry Langley	262	7.6	0
Majority		438	12.7	▼4.2
Turnout		3,440	46.9	▼3.0
Rejected ballots		16	0.46	
Registered electors		7,333		
Liberal Democrats hold		Swing	▼2.1	

=== Denton and Westerhope ===
Denton and Westerhope
Party	Candidate	Votes	%	±%
Newcastle Ind.	Adam Mitchell	1,226	45.4	+13.3
Labour	Bill Purvis	1,093	40.5	+4.1
Conservative	Alexis Fernandes	187	6.9	+0.2
Liberal Democrats	Libby Dicken	109	4.0	+1.0
Green	Cécile Renaud-Glorieux	83	3.1	New
Majority		133	4.9	▼0.7
Turnout		2,698	31.7	▼1.9
Rejected ballots		9	0.33	
Registered electors		8,504		
Newcastle Ind. gain from Labour		Swing	▲4.6	

=== Elswick ===
Elswick
Party	Candidate	Votes	%	±%
Labour	Habib Rahman*	1,383	71.8	−0.2
Green	Peter Thomson	271	14.1	+2.8
Conservative	Saamiya Malik	181	9.4	0
Liberal Democrats	Hamed Aghajani	90	4.7	−2.6
Majority		1,112	57.8	▼3.0
Turnout		1,925	25.2	▼7.5
Rejected ballots		16	0.82	
Registered electors		7,635		
Labour hold		Swing	▼1.5	

=== Fawdon and West Gosforth ===
Fawdon and West Gosforth
Party	Candidate	Votes	%	±%
Liberal Democrats	Peter Lovatt*	1,673	58.5	+0.2
Labour Co-op	Ava Rowell	688	24.1	+1.7
Conservative	Stephen Axford	295	10.3	+0.7
Green	Roger Whittaker	204	7.1	−2.6
Majority		985	34.4	▼1.6
Turnout		2,860	38.9	▲0.1
Rejected ballots		19	0.66	
Registered electors		7,351		
Liberal Democrats hold		Swing	▼0.8	

=== Gosforth ===
Gosforth
Party	Candidate	Votes	%	±%
Liberal Democrats	Tom Woodwark*	1,565	39.0	−1.6
Conservative	Doc Anand	1,334	33.3	+7.0
Labour	Nick Arnold	875	21.8	+1.9
Green	Anna Foster	237	5.9	−7.2
Majority		231	5.8	▼8.6
Turnout		4,011	52.8	▲1.5
Rejected ballots		9	0.22	
Registered electors		7,596		
Liberal Democrats hold		Swing	▼4.3	

=== Heaton ===
Heaton
Party	Candidate	Votes	%	±%
Labour	Mehrban Sadiq	1,384	49.0	+2.7
Green	Andrew Gray	625	22.1	−5.6
Liberal Democrats	Tom Appleby	595	21.1	+3.4
Conservative	Shah Ali	156	5.5	−2.8
Communist	Steve Handford	65	2.3	New
Majority		759	26.9	▲8.3
Turnout		2,825	39.4	▼1.9
Rejected ballots		12	0.42	
Registered electors		7,171		
Labour hold		Swing	▲4.2	

=== Kenton ===
Kenton
Party	Candidate	Votes	%	±%
Labour Co-op	Paula Maines	1,337	55.1	+6.6
Liberal Democrats	Robert Austin	562	23.2	−1.1
Conservative	Zak Mudie	270	11.1	−5.7
Green	Adam Jackson	185	7.6	New
TUSC	Nicholas Fray	71	2.9	−7.5
Majority		775	32.0	▲7.8
Turnout		2,425	33.2	▲1.6
Rejected ballots		8	0.33	
Registered electors		7,313		
Labour hold		Swing	▲3.9	

=== Kingston Park South and Newbiggin Hall ===
Kingston Park South and Newbiggin Hall
Party	Candidate	Votes	%	±%
Labour	Jacqui Robinson*	1,377	66.8	+10.6
Conservative	Jamie Setch	321	15.6	−13.7
Liberal Democrats	Aidan King	249	12.1	−2.4
Green	Tristan Gilet	113	5.5	New
Majority		1,056	51.3	▲24.3
Turnout		2,060	29.6	▼1.2
Rejected ballots		16	0.77	
Registered electors		6,957		
Labour hold		Swing	▲12.2	

=== Lemington ===
Lemington
Party	Candidate	Votes	%	±%
Newcastle Ind.	Joanne Nix	1,077	45.9	+8.7
Labour Co-op	Stephen Barry-Stanners	918	39.1	−2.5
Conservative	Joel Bland	195	8.3	−2.2
Liberal Democrats	Robert Petrie	80	3.4	−1.9
Green	Hilda Frost	76	3.2	−2.1
Majority		159	6.8	▲2.4
Turnout		2,346	33.0	▲1.1
Rejected ballots		6	0.26	
Registered electors		7,111		
Newcastle Ind. gain from Labour		Swing	▲5.6	

=== Manor Park ===
Manor Park
Party	Candidate	Votes	%	±%
Liberal Democrats	Deborah Burns	1,573	53.6	−3.4
Labour	Carly Walker-Dawson	859	29.3	−3.7
Conservative	Beth Spurr	260	8.9	−1.2
Green	Michael Rabley	242	8.2	New
Majority		714	24.3	▲0.3
Turnout		2,934	41.2	▼0.6
Rejected ballots		10	0.34	
Registered electors		7,117		
Liberal Democrats hold		Swing	▲0.2	

=== Monument ===
Monument
Party	Candidate	Votes	%	±%
Labour	Teresa Cairns*	751	63.2	+17.3
Green	James Vesty	205	17.0	−8.7
Conservative	Aaron Whelan-Harvey	133	11.2	−1.1
Liberal Democrats	David Partington	102	8.6	−7.5
Majority		546	45.8	▲24.8
Turnout		1,191	23.7	▼5.5
Rejected ballots		5	0.42	
Registered electors		5,029		
Labour hold		Swing	▲13.0	

=== North Jesmond ===
North Jesmond (2 seats)
Party	Candidate	Votes	%	±%
Liberal Democrats	Gerry Keating*	1,322	65.1	+23.8
Liberal Democrats	Philip Browne	1,276	62.8	+21.5
Labour Co-op	Oskar Avery	567	27.9	−15.3
Labour Co-op	Michael Bell	512	25.2	−18.1
Green	Shehla Naqvi	179	8.8	+1.4
Green	Tim Dowson	135	6.6	−0.8
Conservative	Stephen Dawes	79	3.9	−2.8
Conservative	Gemma Brown	73	3.6	−3.1
Majority		755	37.2	▲15.5
Majority		764	37.6	▲35.7
Turnout		2,032	47.6	▲2.5
Turnout		2,032	47.6	▲12.2
Rejected ballots		79	3.74	
Registered electors		4,433		
Liberal Democrats hold		Swing	▲20.0	
Liberal Democrats gain from Labour		Swing	▲19.8	

Two seats were contested in North Jesmond: the seat due in the ordinary election and a casual vacancy caused by the resignation of Labour councillor Stella Postlethwaite.

=== Ouseburn ===
Ouseburn
Party	Candidate	Votes	%	±%
Liberal Democrats	Gareth Kane*	931	49.7	±0.0
Labour	Asad Syed	705	37.7	+0.1
Green	Phill James	187	10.0	+0.5
Conservative	Marie Summersby	49	2.6	−0.6
Majority		226	12.1	Even
Turnout		1,872	37.6	▼6.4
Rejected ballots		11	0.58	
Registered electors		4,976		
Liberal Democrats hold		Swing	▼0.1	

=== Parklands ===
Parklands
Party	Candidate	Votes	%	±%
Liberal Democrats	Christine Morrissey*	2,143	54.2	+13.1
Labour	Matthew Hill	895	22.6	+5.7
Conservative	Andrew Burnett	536	13.6	−6.2
Green	Audrey MacNaughton	378	9.6	+0.6
Majority		1,248	31.6	▲11.4
Turnout		3,952	44.8	▼3.0
Rejected ballots		22	0.55	
Registered electors		8,824		
Liberal Democrats hold		Swing	▲3.7	

=== South Jesmond ===
South Jesmond
Party	Candidate	Votes	%	±%
Labour	Lesley Storey*	828	45.5	+8.6
Liberal Democrats	Fiona Punchard	476	26.2	+6.6
Green	Alistair Ford	250	13.8	−12.9
Conservative	Elias al Dahan	179	9.8	−5.7
SDP	Martin Evison	85	4.7	+3.4
Majority		352	19.4	▲9.1
Turnout		1,818	36.5	▲3.1
Rejected ballots		13	0.71	
Registered electors		4,975		
Labour hold		Swing	▲1.0	

=== Walker ===
Walker
Party	Candidate	Votes	%	±%
Labour	Margaret Wood*	1,224	70.3	+16.9
Conservative	Alex Walker	229	13.2	+5.8
Liberal Democrats	Stephen Psallidas	100	5.7	−1.3
Green	Tom Whatson	95	5.5	New
Freedom Alliance	Steve Fish	92	5.3	New
Majority		995	57.2	▲35.8
Turnout		1,740	24.7	▼4.5
Rejected ballots		7	0.4	
Registered electors		7,039		
Labour hold		Swing	▲5.6	

=== Walkergate ===
Walkergate
Party	Candidate	Votes	%	±%
Labour	Paul Frew*	1,571	59.6	+15.6
Liberal Democrats	Deborah Gallagher	433	16.4	+1.4
Conservative	Stephen Oxborough	331	12.5	+3.0
Green	Doug Paterson	160	6.1	−0.2
Freedom Alliance	Julie Fish	143	5.4	New
Majority		1,138	43.1	▲23.7
Turnout		2,638	31.8	▼1.8
Rejected ballots		8	0.3	
Registered electors		8,293		
Labour hold		Swing	▲7.1	

=== West Fenham ===
West Fenham
Party	Candidate	Votes	%	±%
Liberal Democrats	P.J. Morrissey	1,200	45.3	+39.6
Labour Co-op	Sylvia Copley*	883	33.3	−10.8
Conservative	Raja Khan	329	12.4	+2.4
Green	Tay Pitman	237	8.9	−2.3
Majority		317	12.0	▼11.2
Turnout		2,649	36.6	▲4.0
Rejected ballots		11	0.41	
Registered electors		7,229		
Liberal Democrats gain from Labour		Swing	▲25.2	

=== Wingrove ===
Wingrove
Party	Candidate	Votes	%	±%
Labour Co-op	Rebecca Shatwell*	1,520	67.3	+11.4
Green	John Pearson	318	14.1	+0.9
Conservative	Jarred Riley	239	10.6	+0.5
Liberal Democrats	Colin Steen	180	8.0	−3.9
Majority		1,202	53.3	▲10.5
Turnout		2,257	31.4	▼5.9
Rejected ballots		12	0.53	
Registered electors		7,198		
Labour hold		Swing	▲5.3	

== Changes between 2023 and 2024 ==
- 29 November 2023: Jason Smith, Newcastle Independents councillor for Lemington, resigned on health grounds. Because the vacancy arose within six months of the next ordinary election, no by-election was held. Smith died in January 2024 after being diagnosed with pancreatic cancer.
- 26 January 2024: Habib Rahman, Labour councillor for Elswick and a former lord mayor, left the Labour Party and began sitting as an independent. He criticised the party's approach to Islamophobia and its position on the Israel–Gaza war.
- 20 March 2024: Brenda Hindmarsh, Liberal Democrat councillor for Fawdon and West Gosforth, resigned with immediate effect. Her vacancy was filled alongside the ward's ordinary seat at the 2024 election.
- 23 April 2024: Shumel Rahman, Labour councillor for Monument, left the party and began sitting as an independent, saying that he had been victimised over his support for Palestine.
