= 2016 Newcastle City Council election =

2016 UK local government election

- 5 May 2016

26 out of 78 seats to Newcastle City Council 40 seats needed for a majority
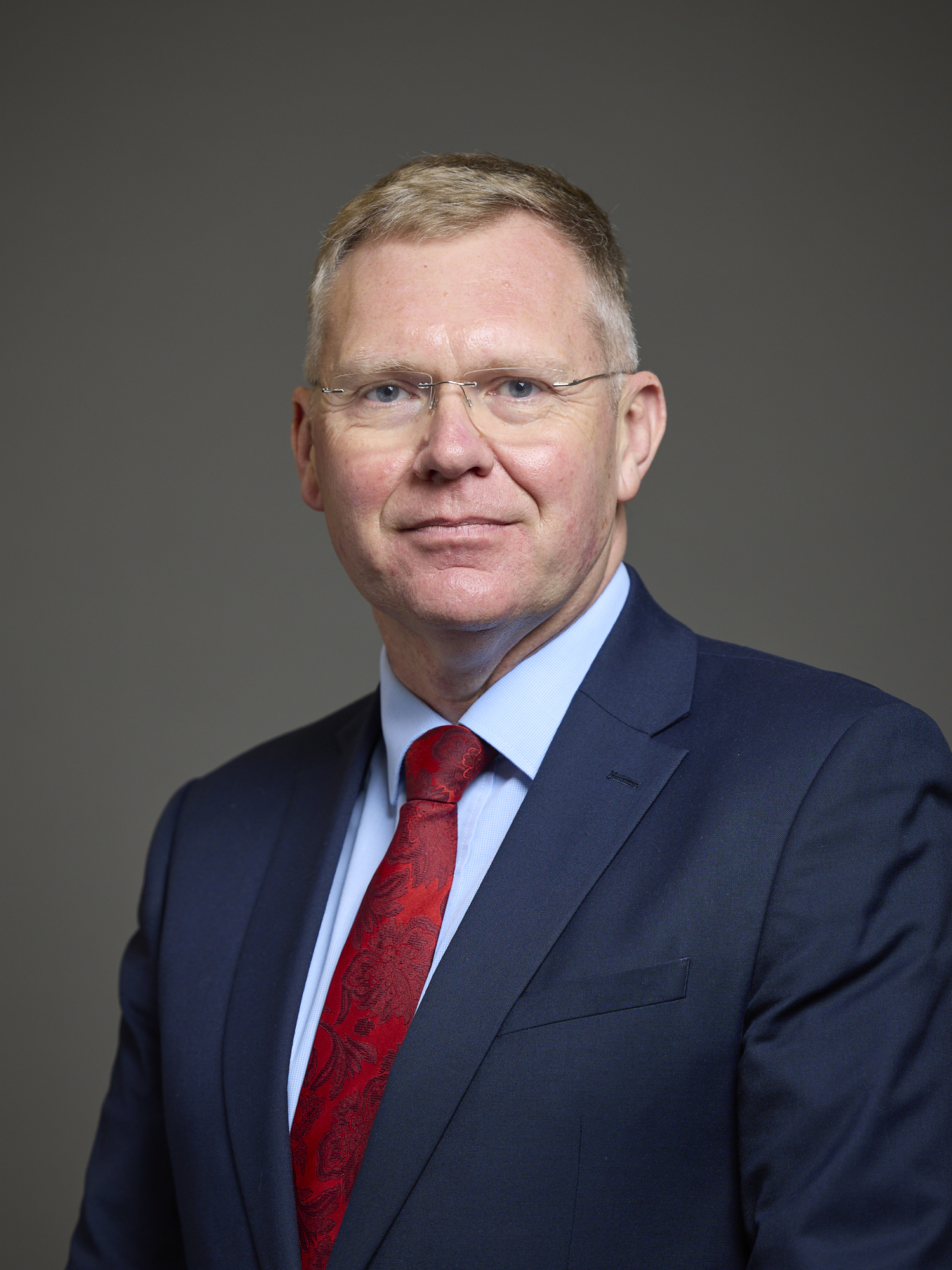
	First party	Second party	Third party
Leader	Nick Forbes	Anita Lower	N/A
Party	Labour	Liberal Democrats	Independent
Leader's seat	Westgate	Castle	Chapel
Last election	53 seats, 45.0%	22 seats, 17.8%	3 seats, 2.3%
Seats before	53	22	3
Seats won	18	7	1
Seats after	55	20	3
Seat change	▲2	▼2	Steady
Popular vote	33,272	17,015	2,888
Percentage	44.5%	22.8%	3.9%
Swing	▼0.5%	▲5%	▲1.6%
- Winner of each seat at the 2016 Newcastle City Council election
Leader before election
Nick Forbes
Labour
Leader after election
Nick Forbes
Labour

The 2016 Newcastle City Council Council elections took place on 5 May 2016 to elect one third of the members of Newcastle City Council in England. The elections took place on the same day as other local elections.

== Target wards for parties ==
The Labour Party sought to expand its representation throughout of the seat, capitalising on gains made in 2015 in areas such as North Jesmond. In 2015, Newcastle City Council leader Nick Forbes said he wanted to make Newcastle a 'Liberal Democrat-free zone’. Despite this however, many seats won by the party in 2015 were held by the Liberal Democrats in 2016 including Fawdon, North Heaton and Castle.

Seats up for election during this cycle were last up for election during 2012. A number of high-profile councillors were up for re-election including current council leader Nick Forbes.

The official opposition to Labour, the Liberal Democrats aimed to hold as much as possible throughout the city, especially in the Castle, West Gosforth and Fawdon wards following heavy losses over the past five years. The party lost control of an additional two seats in 2016, in the Ouseburn and North Jesmond wards, losing heavily to the Labour Party

The Green Party again targeted South Heaton, where the candidate Andrew Gray came second to Labour's John-Paul Stephenson, who won with 59% of the vote.

The Conservatives targeted the West Gosforth ward where in 2015, candidate Steve Kyte was only 17 votes short of winning. However, in 2016, the LibDems again held on to the seat.

Following a relatively strong showing in many seats in 2015, UKIP targeted seats in the East of the city such as Byker and Walker. Despite this, in 2016, no UKIP councillors were elected to Newcastle City Council.

== Overall results ==
Newcastle City Council election, 2016
Party	Seats				Popular vote	
Party	Won	Not up	Total	±	Votes	Percentage
Labour	18	37	55	+2	33,272	45%
Liberal Democrats	7	13	20	-2	17,015	23%
Independent	1	2	3	0	2,888	4%
UKIP	0	0	0	0	9,893	13%
Conservative	0	0	0	0	6,776	9%
Green	0	0	0	0	3,783	5%
Newcastle First	0	0	0	0	1,578	2%
TUSC	0	0	0	0	100	<1%
Communist	0	0	0	0	23	<1%
Total	26	52	78	0	75,328	–
Turnout						

== Ward results ==
Local elections 2016: Benwell and Scotswood
Party	Candidate	Votes	%	±%
Labour	Rob Higgins	1,664	52%	−19.9%
UKIP	Mark Bickerton	1,041	33%	+33%
Conservative	Neville Armstrong	223	7%	−0.3%
Liberal Democrats	Helen Laverick	127	4%	−1.5%
Green	Lee Irving	123	4%	+4%
Majority		623	19%	−36%
Turnout		3178		

Local elections 2016: Blakelaw
Party	Candidate	Votes	%	±%
Labour	David Stockdale	1846	63%	−7.5%
UKIP	Ritchie Lane	470	16%	+16.0%
Liberal Democrats	Bill Schardt	267	9%	−13.3%
Conservative	James Gerard Langley	221	8%	+0.8%
Green	Brendan Derham	117	4%	+4.0%
Majority		1,376	47%	−1.3%
Turnout				

Local elections 2016: Byker
Party	Candidate	Votes	%	±%
Labour	George Alfred Allison	1611	66%	−11.9%
UKIP	David Tilley Robinson-Young	470	19%	+19.0%
Green	Nick Morphet	126	5%	+5.0%
Conservative	Donald Robinson	120	5%	−0.4%
Liberal Democrats	Mark Nelson	100	4%	−1.8%
Majority		1,141	47.0%	−19.9%
Turnout				

Local elections 2016: Castle
Party	Candidate	Votes	%	±%
Liberal Democrats	Ian Graham	1702	44%	−5.9%
Labour	Jacqui Turner	1230	32%	+24.0%
UKIP	Timothy Thomas Marron	490	13%	+13.0%
Conservative	Mary Toward	342	9%	+1.4%
Green	Andrew Jonathan Thorp	120	3%	+3.0%
Majority		472	12%	−3.4%
Turnout				

Local elections 2015: Dene
Party	Candidate	Votes	%	±%
Liberal Democrats	Wendy Barbara Taylor	1906	54%	−4.9%
Labour	Sheila Claire Spencer	975	28%	−1.2%
UKIP	David Muat	275	8%	+8.0%
Conservative	Tim Monckton	244	7%	−4.9%
Green	Tab Bailey	132	4%	+4%
Majority		931	26%	−4.7%
Turnout				

Local elections 2016: Denton
Party	Candidate	Votes	%	±%
Labour	Dan Greenhough	1301	45%	−12.7%
UKIP	Brian David Moore	697	24%	+24.0%
Newcastle_Independents	Sarah Jane Armstrong	333	11%	−6.2%
Liberal Democrats	Colin Thomas Dalgish	289	10%	−5.6%
Conservative	Alan Henry Birkmyre	234	8%	_1.8%
Green	Spinoza Pitman	60	2%	+2.0%
Majority		604	21%	−19.5%
Turnout				

Local elections 2016: East Gosforth
Party	Candidate	Votes	%	±%
Liberal Democrats	Dominic Mark Raymont	1591	44%	+1.0%
Labour	Gareth James Hughes	1167	33%	−1.8%
Conservative	Alison Wake	421	12%	+1.8%
Green	Frances Christine Hinton	248	7%	−5.0%
UKIP	Peter John Dunne	142	4%	+4.0%
TUSC	Nicolas Alan Fray	19	1%	+1.0%
Majority		424	11%	+2.2%
Turnout				

Local elections 2016: Elswick
Party	Candidate	Votes	%	±%
Labour	Ann Veronica Schofield	1778	71%	−8.0%
UKIP	Mark Page	421	17%	+17.0%
Conservative	Ronald Toward	131	5%	−0.5%
Liberal Democrats	James Peter Kenyon	87	3%	−3.0%
Green	Taymar Gem Pitman	70	3%	+3.0%
Majority		1,357	54%	69.4%
Turnout				

Local elections 2016: Fawdon
Party	Candidate	Votes	%	±%
Conservative	Steve Axford	171	5%	
Green	Michael James Gardner	86	3%	
Labour	Clare Penny-Evans	877	28%	
Liberal Democrats	Brenda Hindmarsh	1808	57%	
UKIP	Alexis Fernandes	231	7%	
Majority				
Turnout				

Local elections 2016: Fenham
Party	Candidate	Votes	%	±%
Conservative	Kenneth Wake	274	10%	
Green	Andrew Arthur Stark	88	3%	
Labour	Marion Elizabeth Talbot	1623	57%	
Liberal Democrats	Christine Morrissey	260	9%	
UKIP	Christopher Ballantyne	626	22%	
Majority				
Turnout				

Local elections 2016: Kenton
Party	Candidate	Votes	%	±%
Conservative	Simon Bell	363	13%	
Green	Ian Kilgour Christie	40	1%	
Labour	Jane Louise Streather	1498	55%	
Liberal Democrats	Tracy Connell	174	6%	
UKIP	Penelope Stansfield	576	21%	
TUSC	Oisin Patrick Gourley	62	2%	
Majority				
Turnout				

Local elections 2016: Lemington
Party	Candidate	Votes	%	±%
Conservative	Alison Robinson	158	6%	
Green	Ross Anthony Spray	31	1%	
Labour	Kim McGuinness	1212	45%	
Liberal Democrats	PJ Morrissey	490	18%	
UKIP	Mike Adie	402	15%	
Newcastle_Independents	Jason Smith	408	15%	
Majority				
Turnout				

Local elections 2016: Newburn
Party	Candidate	Votes	%	±%
Conservative	Christopher Brewster	280	10%	
Labour	Steve Fairlie	1398	51%	
Liberal Democrats	Lawrence Hunter	269	10%	
UKIP	James Douglas Robertson	586	21%	
Newcastle_Independents	John Alan Gordon	205	7%	
Majority				
Turnout				

Local elections 2016: North Heaton
Party	Candidate	Votes	%	±%
Conservative	James Robert Bartle	182	5%	
Green	Joe Herbert	230	6%	
Labour	Nora Maebh Casey	1356	37%	
Liberal Democrats	Doreen Huddart	1686	46%	
UKIP	Elisabeth Margery Edmundson	218	6%	
Majority				
Turnout				

Local elections 2016: North Jesmond
Party	Candidate	Votes	%	±%
Conservative	Duncan Carlyle Crute	209	10%	
Green	Shehla Khatoon Naqvi	161	8%	
Labour	Stella Rogers Postlethwaite	942	44%	
Liberal Democrats	Gerard Francis Keating	764	36%	
UKIP	Mark Barton Lewis	62	3%	
Majority				
Turnout				

Local elections 2016: Ouseburn
Party	Candidate	Votes	%	±%
Conservative	Marian Julie Kyte	86	4%	
Green	Sarah Kate O'Hare	181	8%	
Labour	Paula Holland	1062	49%	
Liberal Democrats	Stephen Howse	693	32%	
UKIP	Joseph Todd	134	6%	
TUSC	Mathew Wilson-Boddy	19	1%	
Majority				
Turnout				

Local elections 2016: Parklands
Party	Candidate	Votes	%	±%
Conservative	Karen Jewers	559	16%	
Green	Sandy Irvine	186	5%	
Labour	Shumel Rahman	701	20%	
Liberal Democrats	Pauline Allen	1936	54%	
UKIP	John Atkinson	211	6%	
Majority				
Turnout				

Local elections 2016: South Heaton
Party	Candidate	Votes	%	±%
Labour	John-Paul Stephenson	1327	59%	
Green	Andrew John Plevins Gray	575	25%	
UKIP	Max Elliott Peacock	156	7%	
Conservative	Samuel Boam	106	5%	
Liberal Democrats	Catherine Smith	99	4%	
Majority				
Turnout				

Local elections 2016: South Jesmond
Party	Candidate	Votes	%	±%
Labour	Felicity Ann Mendelson	928	53%	
Liberal Democrats	Tom Woodwark	276	16%	
Conservative	Matthew Thomas McPherson	207	12%	
Green	Matt Busby	207	12%	
UKIP	James Lee Askwith	133	8%	
Majority		652	37%	
Turnout				

Local elections 2016: Walker
Party	Candidate	Votes	%	±%
Conservative	Joan Atkin	118	5%	
Green	David Michael James Tooby	65	3%	
Labour	David Leslie Wood	1738	68%	
Liberal Democrats	Christopher Peter Boyle	108	4%	
UKIP	Tony Sanderson	512	20%	
Majority				
Turnout				

Local elections 2016: Walkergate
Party	Candidate	Votes	%	±%
Conservative	Marian McWilliams	149	5%	
Green	Liam Christie	66	2%	
Labour	Stephen Laird Woods	1565	54%	
Liberal Democrats	David Haydn Besag	322	11%	
UKIP	Raymond Hardy	768	27%	
Communist	Martin Richard Levy	23	1%	
Majority				
Turnout				

Local elections 2016: West Gosforth
Party	Candidate	Votes	%	±%
Liberal Democrats	Nick Cott	1653	44%	−4.6%
Conservative	Steve Kyte	1187	31%	+12.7%
Labour	Oskar Andrew Avery	681	18%	−4.8%
Green	Alistair Christian Ford	155	4%	−4.3%
UKIP	Paul Coulthard	104	3%	+3.0%
Majority		466	13%	−10.8%
Turnout				

Local elections 2016: Westerhope
Party	Candidate	Votes	%	±%
Independent	Marc James Donnelly	2888	74%	+20.9%
Labour	Syed Ullah	381	10%	−12.5%
Newcastle First	Ernie Shorton	224	6%	−16.0%
UKIP	David James Monkhouse	253	6%	+6.0%
Conservative	Jacqueline Mary McNally	117	3%	+0.6%
Liberal Democrats	Colin Steen	33	1%	+1%
Majority		2,507	64%	+33.4%
Turnout				

Local elections 2016: Westgate
Party	Candidate	Votes	%	±%
Conservative	Colin Forster	124	7%	
Green	Cliff Brown	154	9%	
Labour	Nick Forbes	1155	69%	
Liberal Democrats	Barbara Jane Down	62	4%	
UKIP	Anne Taylor	185	11%	
Majority				
Turnout				

Local elections 2016: Wingrove
Party	Candidate	Votes	%	±%
Conservative	Lyle Robert Darwin	233	10%	
Green	John Stephen David Pearson	245	10%	
Labour	Irim Ali	1684	69%	
Liberal Democrats	Mohammad Farsi	80	3%	
UKIP	Joseph Levy	200	8%	
Majority				
Turnout				

Local elections 2016: Woolsington
Party	Candidate	Votes	%	±%
Conservative	Julian Toward	249	9%	
Green	Sarah Elizabeth Norris	64	2%	
Labour	Sharon Ann Pattison	1572	57%	
Liberal Democrats	Ian Laverick	233	8%	
UKIP	Ian McKinnell	530	19%	
Newcastle_Independents	Olga Shorton	119	4%	
Majority				
Turnout				
