= Jeremy Middleton =

British politician (born 1960)

- Born: 19 November 1960 (age 65); Burton on Trent, England
- Education: Tettenhall College
- Alma mater: University of Kent
- Occupation: Businessperson
- Spouse: Catherine Smith (m. 1988)

Jeremy Middleton CBE (born 19 November 1960) is a British businessperson, angel investor, and former Conservative politician.

== Early life ==
Middleton was born on 19 November 1960 in Burton upon Trent to Dennis Middleton and Vivienne Middleton. He was educated at Tettenhall College before studying History at the University of Kent. He married Catherine Smith in 1988, with whom he has three children.

== Business career ==
Middleton started his career in 1984 as a brand manager at Procter & Gamble, a role he held until he became a consultant at PricewaterhouseCoopers in 1988.

He co-founded emergency repairs company HomeServe in 1990, and has served on its executive committee since 1992.

He has been managing director of investment company Middleton Enterprises since 1990, which funds new companies in the North East and part funded the film The Liability. He invested in Atom Bank and Rota, an app providing casual labour in the hospitality sector. He started the Middleton Community Enterprise Fund in 2007, to give money to charities to support their commercial work.

In 2008, he was listed as the 1,259th richest person in the United Kingdom by the Times, with wealth valued at £60 million.

From 2012 to 2016, Middleton served on the board of the North East Local Enterprise Partnership. From 2013 to 2017 he served on the board of energy consultancy Utilitywise.

He is also governor of Studio West School and a board member of a charity for the homeless, Changing Lives.

== Political career ==
Middleton contested Newcastle upon Tyne East and Wallsend in the 1997 general election, losing to Nick Brown. He has five times unsuccessfully contested seats on Newcastle upon Tyne City Council. In the 2004 European Parliament election he was listed second on the Conservative list in the North East region but again failed to be elected. He was the Conservative candidate in the 2004 Hartlepool by-election, where he came fourth.

Middleton served as President of the National Conservative Convention from 2008 to 2009. In April 2009, he was elected onto the board of the Conservative party as Chairman of the National Convention, a role he held until 2012.

In February 2016, Middleton became the first candidate to enter the North East mayoral race and subsequently resigned from the Conservative Party. The elections were subsequently cancelled after North East councils failed to agree on the central government's devolution package.

== Honours ==
He was appointed Commander of the Order of the British Empire (CBE) in the 2012 Birthday Honours for political and charitable services.

Party political offices
Preceded by Simon Mort	President of the National Conservative Convention; 2008–2009	Succeeded by Emma Pidding
Preceded by Don Porter	Chairman of the National Conservative Convention; April 2009–2012	Succeeded by Emma Pidding
