= Newcastle Independents =

Political party in North East England

- Leader: Tracey Mitchell
- Founder: Jason Smith
- Founded: 14 February 2011
- Registered: PP05
- Headquarters: Denton Burn, Newcastle upon Tyne
- Ideology: Localism; Left-wing populism
- Political position: Left-wing
- Councillors: 0 / 78

Website
- www.newcastleindependents.uk

Newcastle Independents, formerly known as Newcastle First, is a populist localist political party based in Newcastle upon Tyne.

Initially established as the Newcastle upon Tyne Community First Party, the party was registered with the Electoral Commission in February 2011 and fielded its first candidates in the 2011 City Council elections.

They won their first council seat in 2019, with two more elected in 2021. The party changed its name from Newcastle First to Newcastle Independents in July 2019, citing in local media a desire to avoid confusion with the far-right Britain First. In fact the party is broadly supportive of nationalising public utilities and was supportive of leftist former Mayor Jamie Driscoll in his 2024 failed attempt to retain the redesigned Mayoralty as an Independent candidate.

As of May 2026, the party has no councillors elected to Newcastle City Council.

== History and electoral performance ==
The party was founded by Jason Smith, a former Conservative Party member. He was elected to the City Council for the Lemington ward in 2021 and stood down in November 2023 prior to the 2024 council election. He died in January 2024, having been diagnosed with terminal pancreatic cancer.

The party has been led by Tracey Mitchell since the 2023 council elections.

Newcastle Independents stood for election under the registered description of It's Time to Put Newcastle First from 2011 to 2019 with some candidates standing under the registered description of Local Community Candidate in 2018 and 2019.

In 2018, The party endorsed two successful independent candidates in the Chapel ward, Olga and Ernie Shorton. The pair had previously stood as candidates for the party but sat as independent councillors upon election.

In 2019, the party won its first council seat, with Ian Donaldson being elected in Callerton & Throckley Ward and the party coming second in both Lemington and Denton & Westerhope Wards.

In May 2021, two more candidates were elected to Newcastle City Council taking their total to three seats.

In May 2023, Newcastle Independents lost the Callerton and Throckley ward but gained two further seats to take their total to four seats.

In May 2024, The party lost a seat in Lemington to LabourandCo-operative candidate Stephen Barry-Stanners, reducing their total to three seats.

In June 2024, the party's leader, Tracey Mitchell, was announced as the election agent for Habib Rahman, an independent candidate standing in Newcastle Central and West at the 2024 general election. Habib Rahman is a former Labour councillor in Newcastle, who resigned in January 2024 over the party's position on Palestine and "institutional racism within the party." Rahman is not a member of the Newcastle Independents and sits as an independent councillor.

=== Former councillors ===
Name	Ward	First elected	Served Until	Notes
Ian Donaldson	Callerton and Throckley	2019	2023	Did not seek re-election
Jason Smith	Lemington	2021	2024	Former Leader of Newcastle Independents
Tracey Mitchell	Denton and Westerhope	2021	2026	Leader of Newcastle Independents
Adam Mitchell	Denton and Westerhope	2023	2026	
Nix Joanne	Lemington	2023	2026	

=== Newcastle City Council ===
Year	Votes	%	+/-	Seats	+/-
2018	2,615	3.4%	▲1.7%	0 / 78	Steady
2019	3,401	5.2%	▲1.8%	1 / 78	▲1
2021	5,498	7.3%	▲2.1%	3 / 78	▲2
2022	4,062	5.7%	▼1.4%	3 / 78	Steady
2023	3,139	4.7%	▼1.0%	4 / 78	▲1
2024	2,032	2.8%	▼1.9%	3 / 78	▼1
2026	1,453	0.6%	▼2.2%	0 / 78	▼3

== Local campaigns ==
Newcastle Independents has led a number of campaigns including:

- Campaigning for the Tyne and Wear Metro to be extended into Northumberland.
- Campaigning to prevent housing being built on green belt land.
- Creating a People's Mayor, if Newcastle established an elected mayor for the city.
- Calling for the creation of a council-owned energy company.
- Highlighting the state of grass cutting in Newcastle.
- Campaigning to stop the closure of Blackett Street to traffic.
