= 2019 Newcastle City Council election =

2019 UK local government election

- 2 May 2019

27 out of 78 seats to Newcastle City Council 40 seats needed for a majority
- Turnout: 37.7%
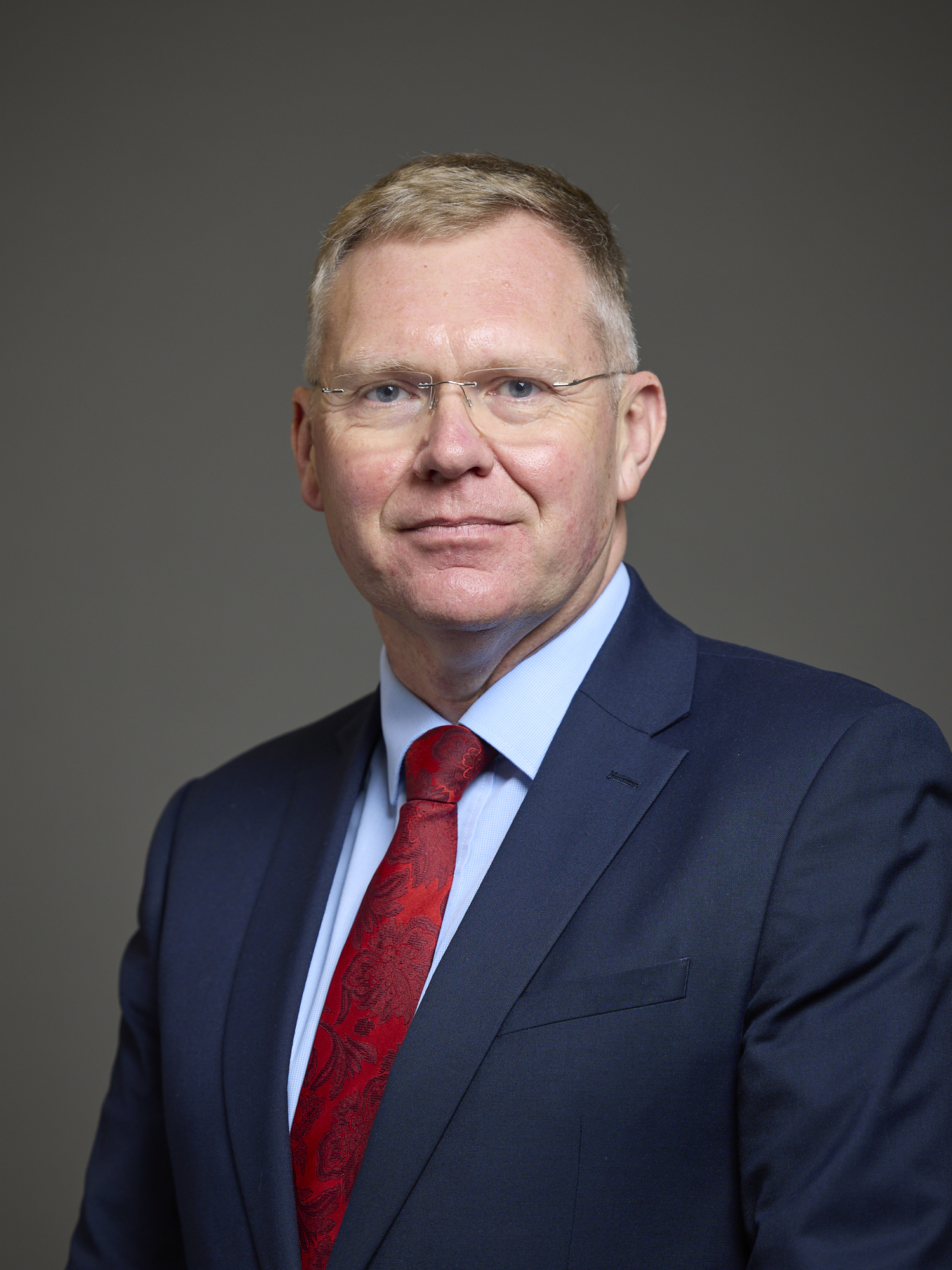
	First party	Second party
Leader	Nick Forbes	Anita Lower
Party	Labour	Liberal Democrats
Leader's seat	Arthur's Hill	Castle
Last election	56 seats, 49.4%	19 seats, 23.7%
Seats before	56	19
Seats won	17	8
Seats after	54	20
Seat change	▼2	▲1
Popular vote	25,559	15,513
Percentage	38.4%	23.3%
Swing	▼11.0%	▼0.4%
	Third party	Fourth party
Leader	Jason Smith	N/A
Party	Newcastle Ind.	Independents
Last election	0 seats, 2.4%	3 seats, 5.7%
Seats before	0	3
Seats won	1	1
Seats after	1	3
Seat change	▲1	Steady
Popular vote	3,401	4,128
Percentage	5.1%	6.2%
Swing	▲2.7%	▲0.5%
- Winner of each seat at the 2019 Newcastle City Council election
Council control before election
Nick Forbes
Labour
Council control after election
Nick Forbes
Labour

The 2019 Newcastle City Council election took place on 2 May 2019, on the same day as other local elections across the United Kingdom.

One third of the seats — 26 out of the 78 — were up for election, being the seats of the councillors who finished third in each individual ward at the all-out elections in 2018, with an additional seat up in the Monument ward following the resignation of a Labour councillor.

The ruling Labour group lost two seats, holding their majority by returning 17 members to the council. The Newcastle Independents, a localist party, gained their first ever seat on the council whilst the Liberal Democrats gained the Ouseburn ward.

Following the election, Nick Forbes returned as leader of the council. Forbes had earlier in the year sought selection as the Labour candidate for the newly created North of Tyne mayoralty, but lost out to Monument councillor Jamie Driscoll.

== Election result ==
The council remained under Labour majority control.

Labour lost two seats. The ward of Callerton and Throckley was lost to the Newcastle Independents, with Ian Donaldson becoming their first ever councillor. The Ouseburn ward was lost to Gareth Kane of the Liberal Democrats.

The Chapel ward saw incumbent independent councillor Olga Shorton lose to Sandra Davison, an independent challenger. Shorton and her husband had attempted to form a "Chapel Independents" political group on the council, which was criticised by fellow independent Chapel councillor Marc Donnelly.

The Conservatives failed to pick up a seat on the council, having last won a seat in 1995.

The Green Party had a strong showing, doubling their share of the total votes to 8.9%, taking over 20% of the vote in Heaton, Monument and South Jesmond.

UKIP contested eight wards but did not win a seat.

2019 Newcastle City Council election
Party	This election				Full council			This election		
Party	Candidates	Seats	Net	Seats %	Other	Total	Total %	Votes	Votes %	+/−
Labour	{{{candidates}}}	17	▼2	63.0	37	54	69.2	25,559	38.4	-11.0
Liberal Democrats	{{{candidates}}}	8	▲1	29.6	12	20	25.6	15,513	23.3	-0.4
Independent	{{{candidates}}}	1	Steady	3.7	2	3	3.8	4,128	6.2	+0.5
Newcastle Ind.	{{{candidates}}}	1	▲1	3.7	0	1	1.3	3,401	5.1	+2.7
Conservative	{{{candidates}}}	0	Steady	0.0	0	0	0.0	7,926	11.9	-1.2
Green	{{{candidates}}}	0	Steady	0.0	0	0	0.0	5,912	8.9	+4.6
UKIP	{{{candidates}}}	0	Steady	0.0	0	0	0.0	3,891	5.8	+4.8
Socialist Alternative	{{{candidates}}}	0	Steady	0.0	0	0	0.0	238	0.4	New
Communist	{{{candidates}}}	0	Steady	0.0	0	0	0.0	24	0.0	Steady

== Ward Results ==
=== Arthur's Hill ===
Arthur's Hill
Party	Candidate	Votes	%	±%
Labour Co-op	Joanne Kingsland	995	70.0	−5.5
Green	Shehla Naqvi	141	9.9	−2.4
Newcastle Ind.	Adam Mitchell	122	8.6	New
Conservative	Luigi Murton	105	7.4	+0.6
Liberal Democrats	William Shepherd	59	4.1	+1.0
Majority		854	60.1	
Turnout		1,422	29.5	
Registered electors		4,821		
Labour Co-op hold		Swing		

=== Benwell and Scotswood ===
Benwell and Scotswood
Party	Candidate	Votes	%	±%
Labour	Jeremy Beecham	1,281	50.5	−11.4
UKIP	Ernest Thornton	437	17.2	+7.1
Newcastle Ind.	Jason Smith	326	12.9	+2.8
Conservative	Liam Bones	233	9.2	−4.9
Liberal Democrats	Hans Christian Andersen	133	5.2	−0.4
Green	Tom Adams	126	5.0	−1.2
Majority		844	33.3	
Turnout		2,536	33.0	
Registered electors		7,686		
Labour hold		Swing		

=== Blakelaw ===
Blakelaw
Party	Candidate	Votes	%	±%
Labour	Linda Hobson	910	51.0	−8.4
UKIP	Tony Sanderson	373	20.9	New
Liberal Democrats	Bill Schardt	220	12.3	−3.6
Conservative	Gerry Langley	168	9.4	−7.1
Green	Rachel Dunfield	113	6.3	−3.8
Majority		537	30.1	
Turnout		1,784	27.7	
Registered electors		6,446		
Labour hold		Swing		

=== Byker ===
Byker
Party	Candidate	Votes	%	±%
Labour	Nick Kemp	1,109	54.7	−8.3
UKIP	Neil Ruston	339	16.7	+7.8
Independent	Jacqui Gilchrist	200	9.9	+0.9
Green	Nick Hartley	194	9.6	−1.3
Conservative	Tom Towle	103	5.1	−3.9
Liberal Democrats	Stephen Psallidas	83	4.1	−1.8
Majority		770	38.0	
Turnout		2,028	31.5	
Registered electors		6,438		
Labour hold		Swing		

=== Callerton and Throckley ===
Callerton and Throckley
Party	Candidate	Votes	%	±%
Newcastle Ind.	Ian Donaldson	787	34.1	+18.2
Labour	Marion Williams	676	29.3	−15.1
Conservative	Lyle Darwin	361	15.6	−15.3
Green	Idwal John	270	11.7	−8.0
Liberal Democrats	Aleisha Stansfield	215	9.3	+0.3
Majority		111	4.8	
Turnout		2,309	33.4	
Registered electors		6,916		
Newcastle Ind. gain from Labour		Swing		

=== Castle ===
Castle
Party	Candidate	Votes	%	±%
Liberal Democrats	Ali Avaei	1,085	34.1	−0.5
Labour	Gordana Vasic Franklin	945	29.7	+1.7
Conservative	Mary Toward	394	12.4	−2.0
UKIP	Tim Marron	331	10.4	New
Independent	Rachel Locke	237	7.5	−3.9
Green	Andrew Thorp	189	5.9	−1.8
Majority		140	4.4	
Turnout		3,181	36.6	
Registered electors		8,681		
Liberal Democrats hold		Swing		

=== Chapel ===
Chapel
Party	Candidate	Votes	%	±%
Independent	Sandra Davison	2,320	64.9	New
Labour	Bill Purvis	494	13.8	+0.4
Independent	Olga Shorton	393	11.0	−43.8
Conservative	Beryl Condra	301	8.4	−3.0
Liberal Democrats	Judith Steen	69	1.9	−6.6
Majority		1,826	51.0	
Turnout		3,577	48.1	
Registered electors		7,435		
Independent gain from Independent		Swing		

=== Dene and South Gosforth ===
Dene and South Gosforth
Party	Candidate	Votes	%	±%
Liberal Democrats	Henry Gallagher	1,639	44.9	−1.9
Labour	Nick Arnold	1,023	28.0	−6.5
Green	Anna Foster	497	13.6	+2.2
Conservative	Jason Birt	278	7.6	+0.5
UKIP	David Muat	217	5.9	+3.5
Majority		616	16.9	
Turnout		3,654	49.9	
Registered electors		7,322		
Liberal Democrats hold		Swing		

=== Denton and Westerhope ===
Denton and Westerhope
Party	Candidate	Votes	%	±%
Labour Co-op	Simon Barnes	1,028	36.4	−2.5
Newcastle Ind.	Tracey Mitchell	908	32.1	−1.4
UKIP	Ian McKinnell	376	13.3	+5.2
Independent	Brian Moore	240	8.5	New
Conservative	Leanne Conway-Wilcox	190	6.7	−3.3
Liberal Democrats	Jackie Slesenger	85	3.0	−6.1
Majority		120	4.2	
Turnout		2,827	33.6	
Registered electors		8,413		
Labour Co-op hold		Swing		

=== Elswick ===
Elswick
Party	Candidate	Votes	%	±%
Labour	Habib Rahman	1,585	72.0	+3.4
Green	Peter Thomson	248	11.3	+1.1
Conservative	Margaret Birkmyre	206	9.4	+0.4
Liberal Democrats	David Faulkner	161	7.3	+2.2
Majority		1,337	60.8	
Turnout		2,200	32.7	
Registered electors		6,737		
Labour hold		Swing		

=== Fawdon and West Gosforth ===
Fawdon and West Gosforth
Party	Candidate	Votes	%	±%
Liberal Democrats	Peter Lovatt	1,615	58.3	+7.8
Labour	Adam Walker	619	22.4	−6.5
Green	Sandy Irvine	270	9.8	+1.4
Conservative	Steve Axford	265	9.6	−2.0
Majority		996	36.0	
Turnout		2,769	38.8	
Registered electors		7,145		
Liberal Democrats hold		Swing		

=== Gosforth ===
Gosforth
Party	Candidate	Votes	%	±%
Liberal Democrats	Tom Woodwark	1,591	40.7	+4.2
Conservative	Steve Kyte	1,029	26.3	−2.5
Labour	Craig Dawson	779	19.9	−5.7
Green	Alistair Ford	514	13.1	+0.2
Majority		562	14.4	
Turnout		3,913	51.3	
Registered electors		7,630		
Liberal Democrats hold		Swing		

=== Heaton ===
Heaton
Party	Candidate	Votes	%	±%
Labour	John-Paul Stephenson	1,314	46.3	+3.9
Green	Andrew Gray	787	27.7	−4.2
Liberal Democrats	Christopher Boyle	502	17.7	−4.4
Conservative	John Dobie	237	8.3	+2.3
Majority		527	18.6	
Turnout		2,840	41.3	
Registered electors		6,882		
Labour hold		Swing		

=== Kenton ===
Kenton
Party	Candidate	Votes	%	±%
Labour	Anya Durrant	1,112	48.5	−5.6
Liberal Democrats	Robert Austin	557	24.3	+7.6
Conservative	Alison Wake	386	16.8	+0.2
Socialist Alternative	Oisin Gourley	238	10.4	+5.0
Majority		555	24.2	
Turnout		2,293	31.6	
Registered electors		7,251		
Labour hold		Swing		

=== Kingston Park South and Newbiggin Hall ===
Kingston Park South and Newbiggin Hall
Party	Candidate	Votes	%	±%
Labour	Jacqui Robinson	1,180	56.2	+1.6
Conservative	Scott Jewitt	614	29.3	+9.9
Liberal Democrats	Colin Steen	304	14.5	−4.2
Majority		566	27.0	
Turnout		2,098	30.8	
Registered electors		6,818		
Labour hold		Swing		

=== Lemington ===
Lemington
Party	Candidate	Votes	%	±%
Labour	Kyle Webster	944	41.6	−9.9
Newcastle Ind.	John Gordon	844	37.2	+11.9
Conservative	Simon Bell	239	10.5	−1.7
Green	Rick Dunfield	122	5.4	−1.3
Liberal Democrats	Robert Petrie	120	5.3	+0.6
Majority		100	4.4	
Turnout		2,269	31.9	
Registered electors		7,104		
Labour hold		Swing		

=== Manor Park ===
Manor Park
Party	Candidate	Votes	%	±%
Liberal Democrats	Matthew Folker	1,665	57.0	+7.0
Labour	Charlie Gray	964	33.0	−1.5
Conservative	Paul Dyer	293	10.0	+1.0
Majority		701	24.0	
Turnout		2,922	41.8	
Registered electors		6,997		
Liberal Democrats hold		Swing		

=== Monument ===
Monument (2 seats due to by-election)
Party	Candidate	Votes	%	±%
Labour	Teresa Cairns	663	29.2	−11.9
Labour	Shumel Rahman	485	21.4	−23.3
Green	Cliff Brown	371	16.4	+9.9
Liberal Democrats	Richard Fleetwood	232	10.2	+7.5
Liberal Democrats	Hamed Aghajani	188	8.3	+4.9
Conservative	Stephen Dawes	178	7.8	−1.2
Conservative	Dewi Roberts	152	6.7	−3.1
Majority		114	5.0	
Turnout		2,269	51.1	
Registered electors		4,439		
Labour hold		Swing		
Labour hold		Swing		

=== North Jesmond ===
North Jesmond
Party	Candidate	Votes	%	±%
Liberal Democrats	Gerry Keating	1,018	50.1	+9.4
Labour Co-op	Alex Hay	577	28.4	−8.5
Green	Tony Waterston	267	13.1	+0.1
Conservative	Kitty Lau	169	8.3	−5.7
Majority		441	21.7	
Turnout		2,031	45.1	
Registered electors		4,503		
Liberal Democrats hold		Swing		

=== Ouseburn ===
Ouseburn
Party	Candidate	Votes	%	±%
Liberal Democrats	Gareth Kane	1,012	49.7	+3.4
Labour Co-op	Stephen Powers	765	37.6	−9.3
Green	Alastair Bonnett	194	9.5	−4.5
Conservative	Jason Carr	65	3.2	−1.8
Majority		247	12.1	
Turnout		2,036	44.0	
Registered electors		4,629		
Liberal Democrats gain from Labour Co-op		Swing		

=== Parklands ===
Parklands
Party	Candidate	Votes	%	±%
Liberal Democrats	Christine Morrissey	1,602	38.9	+1.0
Conservative	John Watts	771	18.7	−3.6
Labour	Laura Repton	660	16.0	−6.9
Independent	John Hall	512	12.4	−0.7
Green	James Milne	347	8.4	−1.9
Independent	John Urquhart	226	5.5	New
Majority		831	20.2	
Turnout		4,118	47.8	
Registered electors		8,611		
Liberal Democrats hold		Swing		

=== South Jesmond ===
South Jesmond
Party	Candidate	Votes	%	±%
Labour	Lesley Storey	679	36.9	−12.6
Green	Clare Andrews	489	26.6	+9.8
Liberal Democrats	Deborah Burns	360	19.6	+5.8
Conservative	Ian Macgilp	286	15.6	−0.8
Communist	Martin Levy	24	1.3	−0.8
Majority		190	10.3	
Turnout		1,838	39.6	
Registered electors		4,639		
Labour hold		Swing		

=== Walker ===
Walker
Party	Candidate	Votes	%	±%
Labour	Margaret Wood	1,083	53.5	−10.1
UKIP	Glen Bolton	650	32.1	+22.5
Conservative	Joan Atkin	150	7.4	−3.3
Liberal Democrats	Adrin Neatrour	143	7.1	+1.8
Majority		433	21.4	
Turnout		2,026	29.2	
Registered electors		6,929		
Labour hold		Swing		

=== Walkergate ===
Walkergate
Party	Candidate	Votes	%	±%
Labour	Paul Frew	1,229	44.3	−8.7
UKIP	Ian Farrelly	690	24.9	+13.3
Liberal Democrats	Deborah Gallagher	417	15.0	−3.3
Conservative	Andrew Bulman	263	9.5	−2.8
Green	Daryl Hughes	175	6.3	−1.4
Majority		539	19.4	
Turnout		2,774	33.6	
Registered electors		8,249		
Labour hold		Swing		

=== West Fenham ===
West Fenham
Party	Candidate	Votes	%	±%
Labour	Sylvia Copley	1,008	44.1	−14.1
UKIP	John Richardson	478	20.9	+8.3
Green	Tay Pitman	256	11.2	+3.2
Conservative	Ken Wake	228	10.0	−0.5
Newcastle Ind.	Sarah Armstrong	183	8.0	−3.0
Liberal Democrats	Libby Dicken	131	5.7	−4.3
Majority		530	23.2	
Turnout		2,284	32.6	
Registered electors		7,008		
Labour hold		Swing		

=== Wingrove ===
Wingrove
Party	Candidate	Votes	%	±%
Labour	Rebecca Shatwell	1,452	56.0	−1.1
Green	John Pearson	342	13.2	+5.1
Liberal Democrats	Kami Kundi	307	11.8	−0.2
Conservative	Lauren Sykes	262	10.1	−2.2
Newcastle Ind.	Joseph Eldridge	231	8.9	New
Majority		1,110	42.8	
Turnout		2,594	37.3	
Registered electors		6,952		
Labour hold		Swing		

== Changes between 2019 and 2021 ==
- In December 2019, Labour councillors Kim McGuinness (Lemington) and Nora Casey (Blakelaw) resigned. McGuinness had been elected as Northumbria Police and Crime Commissioner and resigned to focus on that role.
- In March 2020, Labour councillor George Allison (Byker) died.
- In March 2021, independent councillor Sandra Davison (Chapel) resigned for personal reasons.
- Later in March 2021, Labour councillor Nigel Todd (Arthur's Hill) died.

The local elections scheduled for May 2020, together with subsequent local by-elections, were postponed until 6 May 2021 because of the COVID-19 pandemic. Consequently, no standalone city council by-election was held between the 2019 and 2021 elections. The vacancies were instead filled at the 2021 election, when Byker and Chapel each returned two councillors.
