= 2018 Newcastle City Council election =

2018 UK local government election

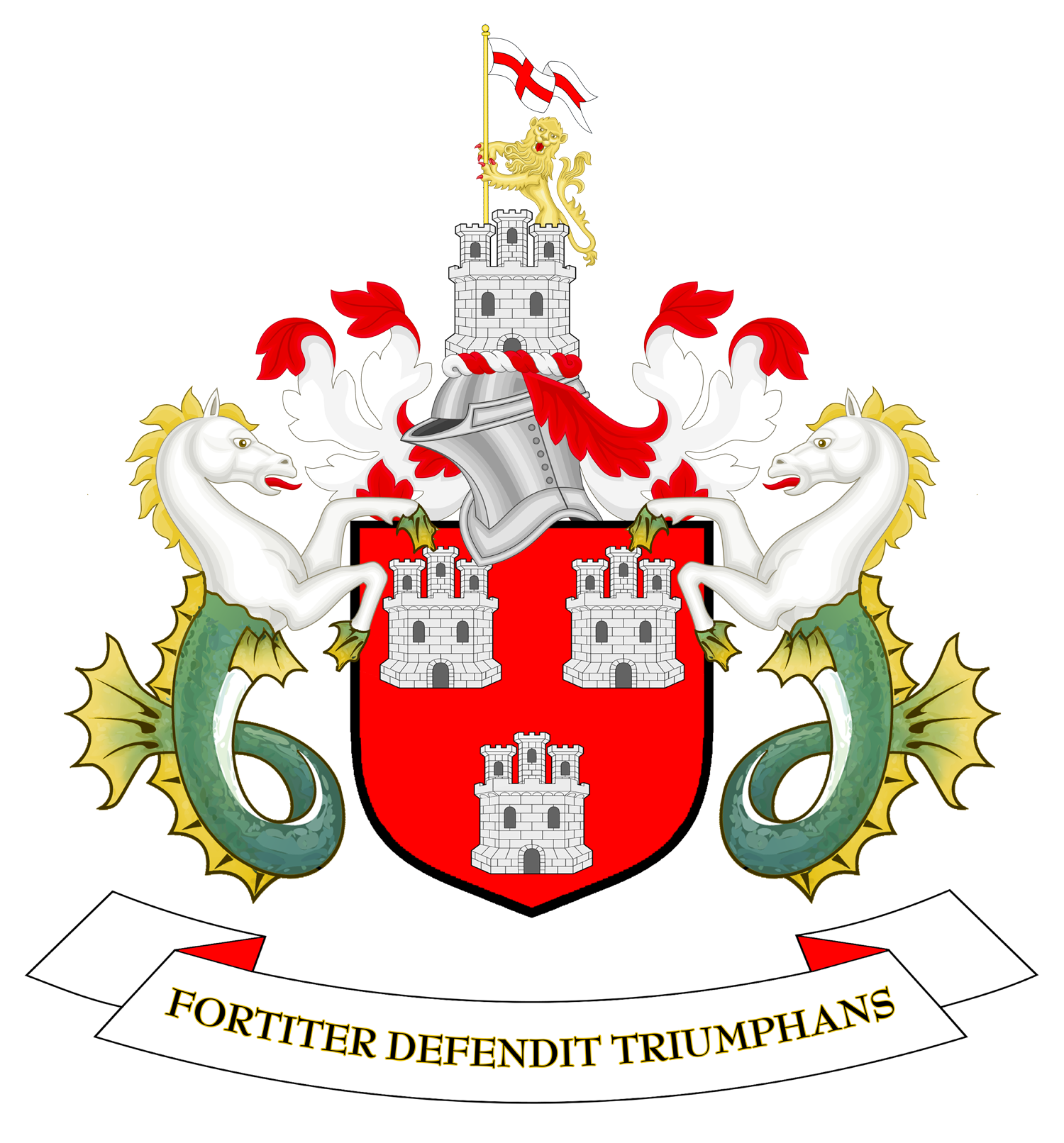
- 3 May 2018
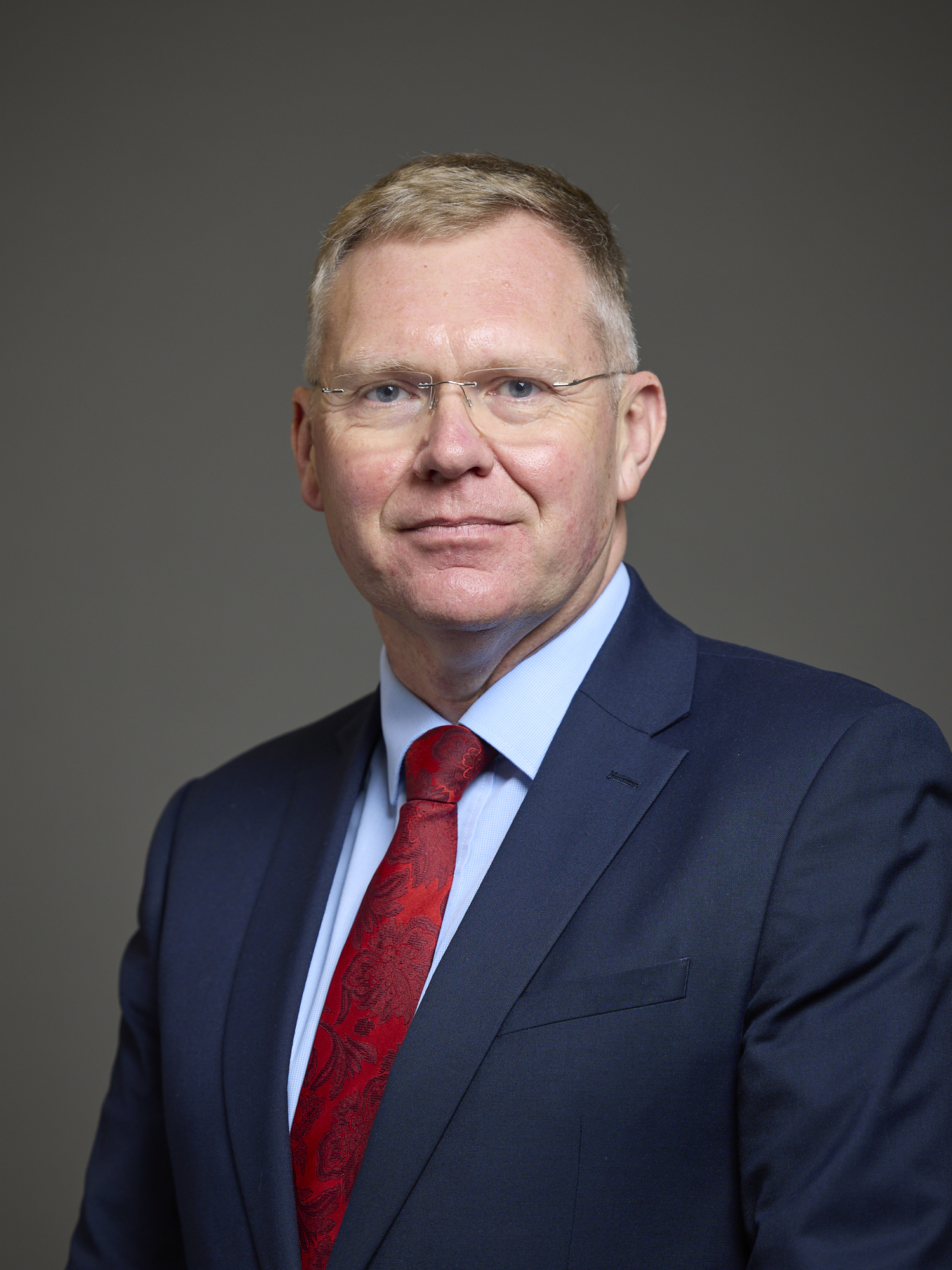
	First party	Second party	Third party
		LD	Con
Leader	Nick Forbes	Anita Lower	Gerry Langley
Party	Labour	Liberal Democrats	Conservative
Leader since	May 2007	May 2013
Leader's seat	Arthur's Hill	Castle	Ran in Dene and South Gosforth (lost)
Last election	55	20	0
Seats won	56	19	0
Seat change	▲1	▼1	0
Popular vote	98,206	47,259	26,167
Percentage	49.4%	23.7%	14.1%
Swing	▲5.3%	▲1.2%	▲4.1%
- Results of the 2018 Newcastle City Council election

The 2018 Newcastle City Council elections took place on 3 May 2018, on the same day as other local elections across the United Kingdom.

For the first time since 2004, boundary changes occurred across Newcastle upon Tyne and the entire council was up for re-election. In June 2016, the Boundary Commission published draft proposals of potential new ward boundaries, with significant changes throughout the entirety of the city, though with some wards remaining the same.

The Conservative Party candidate for the Manor Park ward, Florence Kirkby, is 96 years old and is believed to be one of the oldest people to stand in the United Kingdom in an election.

== Result Summary ==
Newcastle City Council election result, 2018
Party	Candidates						Votes		
Party	Stood	Elected	Gained	Unseated	Net	% of total	%	No.	Net %
Labour	78	56	1			71.7	49.4	98,206	▲5.3
Liberal Democrats	77	19		1		24.3	23.7	47,259	▲1.2
Conservative	78	0					13.1	26,167	▲4.1
Independent	10	3				3.8	5.7	11,254	▲3.7
Green	28	0					4.3	8,726	▼0.7
Newcastle Independents	8	0					2.4	4,831	▲0.4
UKIP	8	0					1.0	1,977	▼12.1
TUSC	2	0					0.1	215	Steady
Communist	1	0					0.0	38	Steady
Totals	291	78				100.0	100.0	198,673	▲123,345

== Council Composition ==
Prior to the election, the composition of the council was:

↓
55	20	3
Labour	LD	Ind

After the election, the composition of the council is:

↓
56	19	3
Labour	LD	Ind

== Ward results ==
=== Arthur's Hill ===
Arthur's Hill
Party	Candidate	Votes	%	±%
Labour	Nick Forbes	1,215	78.4	
Labour	Nigel Todd	1,203	77.6	
Labour	Joanne Kingsland	1,171	75.5	
Green	Taymar Gem Pitman	191	12.3	
Conservative	Luigi Robert Merton	106	6.8	
Conservative	Edward William Sheils	97	6.3	
Conservative	Chrystian Rengifo	79	5.1	
TUSC	Daniel Gilmore	77	5.0	
Liberal Democrats	Shirley Mansfield	60	3.9	
Liberal Democrats	William James Shephard	48	3.1	
Liberal Democrats	Colin Steen	36	2.3	
Turnout		1,550	34.6	

=== Benwell and Scotswood ===
Benwell and Scotswood
Party	Candidate	Votes	%	±%
Labour	Hazel Stephenson	1,742	64.7	
Labour	Rob Higgins	1,695	62.9	
Labour	Jeremy Hugh Beecham	1,668	61.9	
Conservative	Neville Douthwaite Armstong	379	14.1	
Conservative	Ben Audsley	356	13.2	
Conservative	David McPherson	335	12.4	
Newcastle Ind.	Adam Mitchell	272	10.1	
UKIP	Ernest Neil Thornton	271	10.1	
Green	Chris Hayday	167	6.2	
Liberal Democrats	Hans Christian Andersen	150	5.6	
Liberal Democrats	Judith Lesley Steen	119	4.4	
Liberal Democrats	John Charles Mansfield	115	4.3	
Turnout		2,694	35.6	

=== Blakelaw ===
Blakelaw
Party	Candidate	Votes	%	±%
Labour	Oskar Andrew Avery	1,118	60.5	
Labour	Nora Maebh Casey	1,108	60.0	
Labour	Linda Anne Hobson	1,098	59.4	
Conservative	Sarah Sewell	305	16.5	
Liberal Democrats	Bill Schardt	294	15.9	
Conservative	Sean Ian Mennim	259	14.0	
Liberal Democrats	Ian Graham	256	13.9	
Conservative	Amy-Jane Milburn	221	12.0	
Green	Rachel Sheila Dunfield	187	10.1	
Liberal Democrats	Peter Miles Badenoch Thompson	175	9.5	
Turnout		1,847	28.7	

=== Byker ===
Byker
Party	Candidate	Votes	%	±%
Labour	George Alfred Allison	1,436	69.9	
Labour	Anne Veronica Dunn	1,297	63.1	
Labour	Nick Kemp	1,294	63.0	
Green	Nick Hartley	223	10.9	
Conservative	Julie Crump	185	9.0	
Independent	Jacqui Gilchrist	185	9.0	
UKIP	Joe Todd	183	8.9	
Conservative	Donald Robinson	171	8.3	
Conservative	Clifford Nigel Hedley	166	8.1	
Liberal Democrats	Mark Nelson	122	5.9	
Liberal Democrats	Catherine Ellen Bernadette Walker	90	4.4	
Liberal Democrats	Hamed Aghajani	87	4.2	
Turnout		2,055	31.8	

=== Callerton and Throckley ===
Callerton and Throckley
Party	Candidate	Votes	%	±%
Labour	Steve Fairlie	1,245	54.0	
Labour	Linda Isabell Wright	1,224	53.1	
Labour	Marion Yvonne Williams	1,024	44.4	
Conservative	Lyle Darwin	712	30.9	
Conservative	Caitlin Elizabeth Jones	692	30.0	
Conservative	Emmett Toward McNally	607	26.3	
Independent	Idwal Thomas John	454	19.7	
Newcastle Ind.	William Joseph Jobes	367	15.9	
Liberal Democrats	James Peter Kenyon	208	9.0	
Liberal Democrats	Judith Ann Fourie	201	8.7	
Liberal Democrats	Margaret Maddison	187	8.1	
Turnout		2,305	33.7	

=== Castle ===
Castle
Party	Candidate	Votes	%	±%
Liberal Democrats	Anita Anne Lower	1,416	44.9	
Liberal Democrats	Aidan John King	1,118	35.4	
Liberal Democrats	Philip George Lower	1,093	34.6	
Labour	Gareth James Hughes	911	28.9	
Labour	Gordana Vasic Franklin	882	28.0	
Labour	Adam Walker	872	27.6	
Conservative	Jackie McNally	500	15.8	
Conservative	Christopher Parkin	490	15.5	
Conservative	Mary Toward	453	14.4	
Independent	Rachel Elizabeth Locke	359	11.4	
Green	Andrew Jonathan Thorp	244	7.7	
Independent	Brian David Moore	176	5.6	
Independent	James Moore	151	4.8	
Turnout		3,155	38.1	

=== Chapel ===
Chapel
Party	Candidate	Votes	%	±%
Independent	Marc James Donnelly	3,599	83.2	
Independent	Ernie Shorton	2,580	59.6	
Independent	Olga Shorton	2,329	53.8	
Labour	Bill Purvis	580	13.4	
Conservative	Beryl Condra	495	11.4	
Liberal Democrats	Christine Morrissey	367	8.5	
Labour	Sean Peacock	359	8.3	
Liberal Democrats	PJ Morrissey	348	8.0	
Conservative	Duncan Carlyle Crute	301	7.0	
Labour	Abdul Samad	270	6.2	
Conservative	Steve Yewdall	234	5.4	
Turnout		4,328	57.2	

=== Dene and South Gosforth ===
Dene and South Gosforth
Party	Candidate	Votes	%	±%
Liberal Democrats	Wendy Barbara Taylor	2,075	53.9	
Liberal Democrats	Karen Lesley Robinson	1,875	48.7	
Liberal Democrats	Henry Peter Gallagher	1,800	46.8	
Labour	Nick Arnold	1,327	34.5	
Labour	Simon Barnes	1,267	32.9	
Labour Co-op	Michael Graham Bell	1,169	30.4	
Green	Joe Herbert	440	11.4	
Conservative	Heather Chambers	378	9.8	
Conservative	Gerry Langley	282	7.3	
Conservative	Jason Richard Birt	275	7.1	
UKIP	David Muat	93	2.4	
Turnout		3,850	51.0	

=== Denton and Westerhope ===
Denton and Westerhope
Party	Candidate	Votes	%	±%
Labour	Brian Samuel Hunter	1,298	43.1	
Labour	Melissa Jade Sonia Davis	1,228	40.7	
Labour	Dan Greenhough	1,172	38.9	
Newcastle Ind.	Tracey Ann Mitchell	1,010	33.5	
Newcastle Ind.	Alan McKenna	971	32.2	
Newcastle Ind.	Jason Smith	868	28.8	
Conservative	Alan Henry Birkmire	300	10.0	
Liberal Democrats	Sarah Ann Cross	273	9.1	
Liberal Democrats	Colin Thomas Daglish	251	8.3	
Conservative	Pam Howe	245	8.1	
UKIP	Ian McKinnell	244	8.1	
Conservative	William Thompson	188	6.2	
Green	Matthew Robert Benjamin James	133	4.4	
Liberal Democrats	Helen Laverick	118	3.9	
Turnout		3,015	35.9	

=== Elswick ===
Elswick
Party	Candidate	Votes	%	±%
Labour	Ann Veronica Schofield	1,705	72.1	
Labour	Dipu Ahad	1,700	71.9	
Labour	Habib Rahman	1,622	68.6	
Green	Peter John Stuart Thomson	241	10.2	
Conservative	Margaret Hamilton Birkmire	213	9.0	
Conservative	Stephen Thomas Lowrey	206	8.7	
Conservative	Ronald Joseph Toward	171	7.2	
Liberal Democrats	Elizabeth Joyce Dicken	120	5.1	
Liberal Democrats	David Alan Faulkner	120	5.1	
Liberal Democrats	Barbara Jane Down	112	4.7	
Turnout		2,365	34.9	

=== Fawdon and West Gosforth ===
Fawdon and West Gosforth
Party	Candidate	Votes	%	±%
Liberal Democrats	Brenda Hindmarsh	1,880	57.6	
Liberal Democrats	Nick Cott	1,778	54.5	
Liberal Democrats	Peter John Lovatt	1,647	50.5	
Labour	Mick Bowman	943	28.9	
Labour	Anya Elizabeth Cook	936	28.7	
Labour	Shumel Rahman	866	26.5	
Conservative	Steve Axford	380	11.6	
Green	Sandy Irvine	274	8.4	
Conservative	Scott Currie Wakeman	239	7.3	
Conservative	William Stuart Price-Green	199	6.1	
Turnout		3,262	45.5	

=== Gosforth ===
Gosforth
Party	Candidate	Votes	%	±%
Liberal Democrats	Colin Peter Ferguson	1,694	43.2	
Liberal Democrats	Philip Hall	1,605	40.9	
Liberal Democrats	Tom Woodwark	1,431	36.5	
Conservative	Steve Kyte	1,130	28.8	
Conservative	Marie Summersby	1,077	27.5	
Conservative	Alison Wake	1,044	26.6	
Labour	Hilary Franks	1,004	25.6	
Labour	Jane Louise Streather	999	25.5	
Labour	Stoica Ion	847	21.6	
Green	Alistair Christian Ford	504	12.9	
Turnout		3,922	51.1	

=== Heaton ===
Heaton
Party	Candidate	Votes	%	±%
Labour	Lara Blanche Ellis	1,613	50.0	
Labour	Clare Penny-Evans	1,489	46.2	
Labour	John-Paul Stephenson	1,366	42.4	
Green	Andrew John Plevins Gray	1,030	31.9	
Green	Louise Claire Wilson	789	24.5	
Liberal Democrats	Christopher Peter Boyle	712	22.1	
Green	Chris Parker	656	20.3	
Liberal Democrats	Jason Lee Whalley	615	19.1	
Liberal Democrats	Matthew Jack Folker	548	17.0	
Conservative	Alex Collier	195	6.0	
Conservative	Jonathan-Fin Tuddenham	126	3.9	
Conservative	George Carter Lloyd	123	3.8	
Turnout		3,225	40.7	

=== Kenton ===
Kenton
Party	Candidate	Votes	%	±%
Labour	Ged Bell	1,445	56.4	
Labour	Stephen Mark Lambert	1,443	56.3	
Labour	Anya Eleanor Durrant	1,386	54.1	
Liberal Democrats	Robert Thomas Austin	427	16.7	
Conservative	George Frost	426	16.6	
Conservative	Keith Ian Gilfillan	414	16.2	
Liberal Democrats	Rose Vianna Bunker	412	16.1	
Liberal Democrats	Jacqueline Ann Slesenger	322	12.6	
Conservative	Thomas Frederick William Moody	315	12.3	
Green	Greg Rosenvinge	213	8.3	
TUSC	Oisin Patrick Gourley	138	5.4	
Turnout		2,563	35.8	

=== Kingston Park South and Newbiggin Hall ===
Kingston Park South and Newbiggin Hall
Party	Candidate	Votes	%	±%
Labour	George Pattison	1,387	58.2	
Labour	Sharon Ann Pattison	1,373	57.6	
Labour	Jacqui Robinson	1,300	54.6	
Conservative	Scott Jewitt	463	19.4	
Liberal Democrats	Ian Laverick	445	18.7	
Liberal Democrats	Ali Avaei	356	14.9	
Liberal Democrats	Kieran Oliver Robinson	352	14.8	
UKIP	Kim Kimberley-Blackstar	316	13.3	
Conservative	Ibbotson Ben Michael	305	12.8	
Conservative	Alexander Turner Proudlock	240	10.1	
Turnout		2,382	35.2	

=== Lemington ===
Lemington
Party	Candidate	Votes	%	±%
Labour	David Burford Cook	1,423	55.4	
Labour	Kim McGuinness	1,382	53.8	
Labour	Kyle Paul Webster	1,323	51.5	
Newcastle Ind.	Sarah Jane Armstrong	693	27.0	
Newcastle Ind.	John Alan Gordon	649	25.3	
Conservative	Michael Harvey Gilbert	314	12.2	
Conservative	Elizabeth Esther Yewdall	297	11.6	
Conservative	Ann Isabel Wake	283	11.0	
Green	Rick Dunfield	173	6.7	
Liberal Democrats	Ronald Denton Clark	156	6.1	
Liberal Democrats	Robert George Petrie	121	4.7	
Liberal Democrats	Adrin Patrick Neatrour	108	4.2	
Turnout		2,568	36.1	

=== Manor Park ===
Manor Park
Party	Candidate	Votes	%	±%
Liberal Democrats	Doreen Huddart	1,769	53.4	
Liberal Democrats	Gregory Martin Stone	1,707	51.6	
Liberal Democrats	Thomas Anthony Gordon	1,654	50.0	
Labour	Charlie Gray	1,141	34.5	
Labour	Alex Benson	1,071	32.4	
Labour	Sylvia Ann Copley	1,013	30.6	
Conservative	Paul John Dyer	297	9.0	
Conservative	Leanne Conway-Wilcox	230	6.9	
Conservative	Florence Mary Kirkby	227	6.9	
Green	Michael James Gardner	160	4.8	
Turnout		3,310	46.7	

=== Monument ===
Monument
Party	Candidate	Votes	%	±%
Labour	Jane Christina Byrne	839	66.8	
Labour	Rosie Hogg	793	63.1	
Labour	Jamie Driscoll	763	60.7	
Green	Cliff Brown	235	18.7	
Conservative	Samuel Bown	187	14.9	
Conservative	Elizabeth Sewell	186	14.8	
Conservative	Vivian Mary White	172	13.7	
Liberal Democrats	Stephen Anthony Psallidas	131	10.4	
Liberal Democrats	Robert Ernest Walker	121	9.6	
Liberal Democrats	Kamaljeet Singh Kundi	119	9.5	
Turnout		1,256	26.2	

=== North Jesmond ===
North Jesmond
Party	Candidate	Votes	%	±%
Labour	Stella Rogers Postlethwaite	917	45.4	
Labour	Wendy Susanna Young	834	41.3	
Liberal Democrats	Gerry Keating	822	40.7	
Labour	Alexander Geoffrey Hay	746	36.9	
Liberal Democrats	David Haydn Besag	725	35.9	
Liberal Democrats	Crispin Melvill Welby	707	35.0	
Conservative	Kitty Lau	282	14.0	
Conservative	James Cowling	273	13.5	
Green	Shehla Khatoon Naqvi	262	13.0	
Conservative	James Robert Bartle	247	12.2	
Turnout		2,021	37.4	

=== Ouseburn ===
Ouseburn
Party	Candidate	Votes	%	±%
Labour	Paula Holland	1,024	51.6	
Labour	Alistair Stuart Chisholm	968	48.8	
Labour	Stephen Alan Powers	931	46.9	
Liberal Democrats	Gareth Kane	919	46.3	
Liberal Democrats	Ciaran Joseph Morrissey	705	35.5	
Liberal Democrats	Aleisha Naomi Stansfield	641	32.3	
Green	Rachel Holland	277	14.0	
Green	Ralph Dominic Pettingill	159	8.0	
Conservative	Jason Stephen Carr	100	5.0	
Conservative	Harry Richard Craggs	87	4.4	
Conservative	Nicholas Sundin^{a}	68	3.4	
Turnout		1,985	36.0	

- ^{a} Nicholas Sundin was suspended by the Conservative Party due to a series of Islamophobic social media posts and offensive comments he has made about Hillsborough survivors. He remained on the ballot as a Conservative candidate, but would have sat as an independent had he won. He stood in a ward in Gateshead in 2015 for UKIP.

=== Parklands ===
Parklands
Party	Candidate	Votes	%	±%
Liberal Democrats	Robin Arthur John Ashby	2,057	46.5	
Liberal Democrats	Pauline Allen	1,925	43.5	
Liberal Democrats	David Christopher Down	1,679	37.9	
Labour	Susan Pearson	1,014	22.9	
Conservative	Simon Bernard Bell	987	22.3	
Independent	John James Dockerty	840	19.0	
Conservative	Karen Jewers	792	17.9	
Labour	Louise Kathleen Sutcliffe	722	16.3	
Labour	Geoff O'Brien	715	16.2	
Conservative	John Grierson Dobie	688	15.5	
Independent	John Hall	581	13.1	
Green	Frances Christine Hinton	455	10.3	
Turnout		4,426	51.4	

=== South Jesmond ===
South Jesmond
Party	Candidate	Votes	%	±%
Labour	Felicity Ann Mendelson	1,052	57.7	
Labour	Arlene Ainsley	994	54.5	
Labour	Judy Pearce	902	49.5	
Liberal Democrats	Alexandra Louise Logan	319	17.5	
Green	Clare Pauline Andrews	306	16.8	
Conservative	Ian Donald MacGilp	299	16.4	
Conservative	Christopher Luke Murray	292	16.0	
Conservative	Max Joseph Graham	284	15.6	
Green	Tony Waterston	272	14.9	
Liberal Democrats	Deborah Elizabeth Burns	251	13.8	
Liberal Democrats	Mark Keville	201	11.0	
Communist	Martin Richard Levy	38	2.1	
Turnout		1,824	28.4	

=== Walker ===
Walker
Party	Candidate	Votes	%	±%
Labour	John Douglas Stokel-Walker	1,556	72.7	
Labour	David Leslie Wood	1,379	64.4	
Labour	Margaret Wood	1,361	63.6	
Conservative	Joan Atkin	230	10.7	
UKIP	Tony Sanderson	206	9.6	
Conservative	Elle Clarke	189	8.8	
Conservative	Daniel Robert George Percy	186	8.7	
Green	Ed Laschet	141	6.6	
Liberal Democrats	Robert Lambert Renton	114	5.3	
Liberal Democrats	Joan Margaret Trinder	81	3.8	
Liberal Democrats	Susan Joyce Vernon	77	3.6	
Turnout		2,141	30.9	

=== Walkergate ===
Walkergate
Party	Candidate	Votes	%	±%
Labour	Stevie Wood	1,799	59.4	
Labour	Maureen Beatrice Lowson	1,739	57.4	
Labour	Paul Frew	1,606	53.0	
Liberal Democrats	Deborah Ann Gallagher	555	18.3	
Conservative	Charlie Terance Owen Jones	373	12.3	
UKIP	Ray Hardy	351	11.6	
Conservative	Lance Robson	347	11.5	
Liberal Democrats	Bill Signey	344	11.4	
Conservative	Joseph Stuart Teasdale	322	10.6	
Liberal Democrats	David Serge Slesenger	271	8.9	
Green	Alastair Bonnett	233	7.7	
Turnout		3,029	36.7	

=== West Fenham ===
West Fenham
Party	Candidate	Votes	%	±%
Labour	Karen Louise Kilgour	1,496	60.1	
Labour	Ian Tokell	1,452	58.3	
Labour	Marion Elizabeth Talbot	1,448	58.2	
Conservative	Andrew Bulman	360	14.5	
UKIP	John Thomas Richardson	313	12.6	
Conservative	Joy Crute	311	12.5	
Newcastle Ind.	Ian Alfred Rose Fraser	273	11.0	
Conservative	Kenneth Wake	262	10.5	
Liberal Democrats	John Edward Thorley	248	10.0	
Green	Daryl Hughes	199	8.0	
Liberal Democrats	Lucy Mary Keating	180	7.2	
Liberal Democrats	Mohammed Kamruzzaman Milon	146	5.9	
Turnout		2,490	35.4	

=== Wingrove ===
Wingrove
Party	Candidate	Votes	%	±%
Labour	Joyce McCarty	1,961	68.2	
Labour	Irim Ali	1,903	66.2	
Labour	Rebecca Shatwell	1,641	57.1	
Conservative	Harriet Beaty	355	12.3	
Liberal Democrats	Philip McArdle	344	12.0	
Green	Paula Blair	319	11.1	
Liberal Democrats	Andrew McQuillin	312	10.8	
Conservative	Neil Cameron	293	10.2	
Conservative	Kieran McNally	288	10.0	
Green	John Pearson	233	8.1	
Liberal Democrats	Mohammad Farsi	207	7.2	
Turnout		2,876	41.4	
