= 2024 Newcastle City Council election =

Local election in Newcastle, England

- 2 May 2024

27 out of 78 seats to Newcastle City Council 40 seats needed for a majority
	Majority party	Minority party	Third party
Leader	Nick Kemp	Colin Ferguson	Tracey Mitchell
Party	Labour	Liberal Democrats	Newcastle Ind.
Leader's seat	Byker	Gosforth	Denton and Westerhope
Last election	48 seats, 41.7%	23 seats, 27.8%	4 seats, 4.7%
Seats before	46	23 (Note: Including one vacant seat last held by Liberal Democrats.)	4 (Note: Including one vacant seat last held by Newcastle Independents.)
Seats won	15	7	1
Seats after	45	23	3
Seat change	▼1	Steady	▼1
Popular vote	29,576	18,091	2,032
Percentage	40.6%	24.8%	2.8%
Swing	▼1.1%	▼3.0%	▼1.9%
	Fourth party	Fifth party	Sixth party
Party	Independent	Green	Conservative
Last election	3 seats, 4.2%	0 seats, 9.4%	0 seats, 11.5%
Seats before	5	0	0
Seats won	1	2	1
Seats after	4	2	1
Seat change	▼1	▲2	▲1
Popular vote	4,705	10,399	7,681
Percentage	6.5%	14.3%	10.5%
Swing	▲2.3%	▲4.9%	▼1.0%
- Winner of each seat at the 2024 Newcastle City Council election
Leader before election
Nick Kemp
Labour
Leader after election
Nick Kemp
Labour

The 2024 Newcastle City Council election was held on Thursday 2 May 2024, to elect members of Newcastle City Council in Tyne and Wear, England. It was held alongside the North East mayoral election, the Northumbria Police and Crime Commissioner election, and other local elections in the United Kingdom held on the same day. As with other local council elections, it was held using first past the post, with councillors being elected to serve four year terms.

There were 27 of the 78 seats on the council up for election, being the usual third of the council plus a by-election in the Fawdon and West Gosforth ward.

Labour were returned as the largest party on the council, returning 15 councillors of the 27 seats up for election - a net loss of one seat, leaving them with 45 seats - down three from the 2023 election. The Liberal Democrats continued as the main opposition party on the council, holding seven seats, keeping their number of councillors steady at 23. The Newcastle Independents lost one seat to Labour, leaving them with three seats on the council. The Green Party took their first two seats, winning the wards of Byker and Elswick from Labour. The Conservatives also gained their first seat since 1995, taking Gosforth from the Liberal Democrats.

Following the election, Nick Kemp returned as leader of the council and as leader of the Labour group. He had been challenged for the leadership of the city's Labour group by Cllr Dan Greenhough prior to the election.

== Background ==
Newcastle has traditionally been a strong area for the Labour Party. Labour controlled the council from its creation in 1973 until 2004, when the Liberal Democrats won a majority on the council. Labour retook control in 2011, and maintained a majority at every subsequent election through 2024.

=== Previous election ===
At the previous election in 2023, Labour won 14 seats (a loss of three seats) with 41.7% of the vote. This left them with 48 seats, retaining their majority. Liberal Democrats won ten seats (a gain of two seats) with 27.8% of the vote. This took them up to 23 seats, their most on the council since 2014. Newcastle Independents won two seats (a gain of one) to take them up to four seats, their highest seat total ever. An independent councillor was returned in Chapel ward, meaning the ward remained exclusively represented by independents.

2023 Newcastle City Council election result
Party	Seats Won	Total Seats	Vote share
Labour	14	48	41.7%
Liberal Democrats	10	23	27.8%
Newcastle Independents	2	4	4.7%
Independent	1	3	4.2%
Conservatives	0	0	11.5%
Green Party	0	0	9.4%
Total	27	78	

=== Before the election ===
On 26 April 2024, Newcastle's Evening Chronicle reported that Nick Kemp was to face a leadership challenge from Dan Greenhough, a councillor in Denton & Westerhope. This was the second year in a row that Kemp was reported to be facing a challenge from within his party, with Kenton councillor Ged Bell withdrawing a challenge in 2023.

Kemp had originally served in the cabinet of former leader Nick Forbes until 2020 before resigning claiming he was being "undermined by constant sniping and personal animosities." In 2021, Kemp challenged Forbes for the leadership, losing the vote by 30 votes to 22. After Forbes was deselected by local members in 2022, Kemp assumed the leadership after defeating Clare Penny-Evans and Irim Ali in a two-round contest.

This marked the third year in a row where a contest emerged between Kemp and allies of Nick Forbes, with Bell, Penny-Evans and Greenhough being viewed as allies of Forbes. The leadership would be contested at a group meeting on 8 May 2024, six days after the election. Kemp retained the leadership of the Labour group.

== Election result ==
The seats up for election in 2024 were last contested in 2021; because of the delay of all local elections due to the COVID-19 pandemic, the seats are up for election after three years rather than the usual four. In that election, Labour won 18 seats with 39.2% of the vote, Liberal Democrats won six seats with 19.5% of the vote, independents won two seats with 7.0% of the vote, and Newcastle Independents won two seats with 6.8% of the vote.

The council remained under Labour majority control. Labour made a net loss of one seat. The Green Party won two seats, being their first ever representation on the council, and the Conservatives won a seat in Gosforth, being the first time they had won a seat on the council in 32 years.

2024 Newcastle City Council election
Party	This election				Full council			This election		
Party	Candidates	Seats	Net	Seats %	Other	Total	Total %	Votes	Votes %	+/−
Labour	{{{candidates}}}	15	▼1	55.6	31	45	57.7	29,576	40.6	−1.1
Liberal Democrats	{{{candidates}}}	7	Steady	25.9	16	23	29.5	18,091	24.8	−3.0
Independent	{{{candidates}}}	1	▼1	3.7	3	4	5.1	4,705	6.5	+2.3
Newcastle Ind.	{{{candidates}}}	1	▼1	3.7	2	3	3.8	2,032	2.8	−1.9
Green	{{{candidates}}}	2	▲2	7.4	0	2	2.6	10,399	14.3	+4.9
Conservative	{{{candidates}}}	1	▲1	3.7	0	1	1.3	7,681	10.5	−1.0
North East	{{{candidates}}}	0	Steady	0.0	0	0	0.0	160	0.2	
TUSC	{{{candidates}}}	0	Steady	0.0	0	0	0.0	78	0.1	
Communist	{{{candidates}}}	0	Steady	0.0	0	0	0.0	71	0.1	
SDP	{{{candidates}}}	0	Steady	0.0	0	0	0.0	52	0.1	

=== Seats changing hands ===
The following is a list of seats that changed hands at this election. This is based on when these seats were last contested in 2021, not when the wards were last contested. Losing candidates who contested the election in 2024 are marked with an asterisk (*).

Seats changing hands
Seat	2021		2024	
Seat	Party	Member	Party	Member
Byker	Labour	Veronica Dunn	Green	Nick Hartley
Castle	Liberal Democrats	Helen Laverick	Labour Co-op	Andrew Herridge
Elswick	Labour	Nicu Ion*	Green	Khaled Musharraf
Gosforth	Liberal Democrats	Karen Robinson*	Conservative	Doc Anand
Lemington	Newcastle Ind.	Jason Smith	Labour Co-op	Stephen Barry-Stanners
North Jesmond	Labour	Tanya Prestwell	Liberal Democrats	James Coles
West Fenham	Labour Co-op	Ian Tokell*	Liberal Democrats	Mark Mitchell

== Ward results ==
Sitting councillors standing for re-election are marked with an asterisk (*).

=== Arthur's Hill ===
Arthur's Hill
Party	Candidate	Votes	%	±%
Labour Co-op	Stephen Powers*	819	50.5	−18.6
Independent	Rowshon Uddin	396	24.4	New
Green	Alistair Ford	223	13.7	−3.5
Conservative	Maria Manco	113	7.0	−1.9
Liberal Democrats	Christopher Howden	71	4.4	−0.4
Rejected ballots		18	1.1	
Majority		423	26.1	
Turnout		1,622	30.1	
Registered electors		5,387		
Labour Co-op hold		Swing	▼20.8	

=== Benwell & Scotswood ===
Benwell & Scotswood
Party	Candidate	Votes	%	±%
Labour	Rob Higgins*	1,659	61.2	−3.8
Independent	David McGovern	412	15.2	New
Conservative	Ronald Thompson	278	10.2	−8.7
Green	Lee Irving	226	8.3	+0.8
Liberal Democrats	Hans Andersen	138	5.1	−3.5
Rejected ballots		31	1.1	
Majority		1,247	46.0	
Turnout		2,713	32.8	
Registered electors		8,269		
Labour hold		Swing		

=== Blakelaw ===
Blakelaw
Party	Candidate	Votes	%	±%
Labour	Marion Williams*	1,215	63.7	+4.0
Conservative	Thomas Lian-Hoare	261	13.7	+1.2
Green	James Milne	243	12.7	+8.1
Liberal Democrats	Bill Shepherd	188	9.9	+3.1
Rejected ballots		12	0.6	
Majority		954	50.0	
Turnout		1907	27.4	
Registered electors		6,955		
Labour hold		Swing		

=== Byker ===
Byker
Party	Candidate	Votes	%	±%
Green	Nick Hartley	1,291	56.8	+19.1
Labour	Carly Walker-Dawson	808	35.6	−13.8
Conservative	Jamie Hampton	115	6.8	−0.3
Liberal Democrats	Mark Ridyard	57	2.5	−3.4
Rejected ballots		30	1.3	
Majority		483	21.3	
Turnout		2,271	33.1	
Registered electors		6,857		
Green gain from Labour		Swing		

=== Callerton & Throckley ===
Callerton & Throckley
Party	Candidate	Votes	%	±%
Labour Co-op	Linda Wright*	1,535	50.8	+9.1
Conservative	Alexis Fernandes	775	25.6	+7.0
Green	Idwal John	475	15.7	+3.4
Liberal Democrats	Richard Morris	239	7.9	+1.4
Rejected ballots		32	1.1	
Majority		760	25.1	
Turnout		3,024	33.3	
Registered electors		9,093		
Labour Co-op hold		Swing		

=== Castle ===
Castle
Party	Candidate	Votes	%	±%
Labour Co-op	Andrew Herridge	1,509	40.3	+3.2
Liberal Democrats	Jamie Robinson	1,422	37.9	−5.3
Conservative	Daniel Burnett	463	12.4	−0.4
Green	Andrew Thorp	354	9.4	+2.5
Rejected ballots		37	1.0	
Majority		87	2.3	
Turnout		3,748	33.0	
Registered electors		11,341		
Labour Co-op gain from Liberal Democrats		Swing		

=== Chapel ===
Chapel
Party	Candidate	Votes	%	±%
Independent	Lawrence Hunter*	2,401	70.5	−8.3
Labour	Bill Purvis	588	17.3	+5.4
Conservative	Ian Forster	240	7.1	+1.3
Liberal Democrats	Judith Steen	100	2.9	+1.2
Green	Philip Brookes	75	2.2	+0.4
Rejected ballots		19	0.6	
Majority		1,813	53.3	
Turnout		3,404	45.0	
Registered electors		7,565		
Independent hold		Swing		

=== Dene & South Gosforth ===
Dene & South Gosforth
Party	Candidate	Votes	%	±%
Liberal Democrats	Karen Robinson*	1,699	46.2	−2.0
Labour	Hilary Franks	1,181	32.1	−3.4
Green	Laurence Taylor	509	13.9	+5.2
Conservative	Gerry Langley	285	7.8	+0.2
Majority		518	14.1	
Turnout		3,674	49.9	
Registered electors		7,366		
Liberal Democrats hold		Swing		

=== Denton & Westerhope ===
Denton & Westerhope
Party	Candidate	Votes	%	±%
Newcastle Ind.	Tracey Mitchell*	1,232	45.7	+0.3
Labour Co-op	Vince Barry-Stanners	1,112	41.2	+0.7
Conservative	Jack Luke	166	6.2	−0.7
Green	William Whitaker	102	3.8	+0.7
Liberal Democrats	Elizabeth Dicken	86	3.2	−0.8
Rejected ballots		12	0.4	
Majority		120	4.4	
Turnout		2,698	31.7	
Registered electors		8,524		
Newcastle Ind. hold		Swing		

=== Elswick ===
Elswick
Party	Candidate	Votes	%	±%
Green	Khaled Musharraf	1,190	45.4	+31.3
Labour	Nicu Ion*	1,083	41.3	−30.5
Conservative	Tom Horgan Davison	231	8.8	−0.6
Liberal Democrats	Hamed Aghajani	117	4.5	−0.2
Rejected ballots		27	1.0	
Majority		107	4.1	
Turnout		2,621	33.9	
Registered electors		7,739		
Green gain from Labour		Swing		

=== Fawdon & West Gosforth ===
Fawdon & West Gosforth (2 seats)
Party	Candidate	Votes	%	±%
Liberal Democrats	John Hall	1,604	61.0	+2.5
Liberal Democrats	Rob Austin	1,530	58.2	−0.3
Labour	Gordana Vasic Franklin	684	26.0	+1.8
Labour	Asad Syed	625	23.8	−0.3
Green	Roger Whittaker	395	15.0	+7.9
Conservative	Maria Piazza	223	8.5	−1.8
Conservative	Alexander McMullen	200	7.6	−2.7
Rejected ballots		23	0.4	
Majority		846	16.1	
Turnout		2,631	35.4	
Registered electors		7,436		
Liberal Democrats hold		Swing		
Liberal Democrats hold		Swing		

Two seats were contested in Fawdon & West Gosforth: one in the ordinary election and one to fill the casual vacancy caused by the resignation of Liberal Democrat councillor Brenda Hindmarsh.

=== Gosforth ===
Gosforth
Party	Candidate	Votes	%	±%
Conservative	Doc Anand	1,399	33.7	+0.4
Liberal Democrats	Tahir Siddique	1,288	31.0	−8.0
Labour Co-op	Michael Bell	952	22.9	+1.1
Green	Frances Hinton	350	8.4	+2.5
North East	Brian Moore	160	3.9	New
Rejected ballots		17	0.4	
Majority		111	2.7	
Turnout		4,149	53.8	
Registered electors		7,715		
Conservative gain from Liberal Democrats		Swing		

=== Heaton ===
Heaton
Party	Candidate	Votes	%	±%
Labour Co-op	Clare Penny-Evans*	1,543	44.5	−4.5
Green	Andrew Gray	671	19.4	−2.7
Independent	Chandni Chopra	525	15.1	New
Liberal Democrats	Tom Appleby	494	14.3	−6.8
Conservative	John Dobie	162	4.7	−0.8
Communist	Steve Handford	71	2.0	−0.3
Rejected ballots		14	0.4	
Majority		872	25.2	
Turnout		3,466	46.2	
Registered electors		7,497		
Labour Co-op hold		Swing		

=== Kenton ===
Kenton
Party	Candidate	Votes	%	±%
Labour	Stephen Lambert*	1,647	65.3	+10.2
Liberal Democrats	Craig Austin	332	13.2	−10.0
Green	Adam Jackson	274	10.9	+3.3
Conservative	Zak Mudie	192	7.6	−3.5
TUSC	Nick Fray	78	3.1	+0.2
Rejected ballots		28	1.1	
Majority		1,315	52.1	
Turnout		2,523	34.2	
Registered electors		7,382		
Labour hold		Swing		

=== Kingston Park South & Newbiggin Hall ===
Kingston Park South & Newbiggin Hall
Party	Candidate	Votes	%	±%
Labour	Alexander Hay*	1,364	65.0	−1.8
Conservative	Amy Laverick	345	16.4	+0.8
Liberal Democrats	David Partington	243	11.6	−0.5
Green	Tahir Mahmood	147	7.0	+1.5
Rejected ballots		30	1.4	
Majority		1,019	48.5	
Turnout		2,099	30.1	
Registered electors		6,981		
Labour hold		Swing		

=== Lemington ===
Lemington
Party	Candidate	Votes	%	±%
Labour Co-op	Stephen Barry-Stanners	1,018	45.1	+6.0
Newcastle Ind.	Zoey Saul	800	35.5	−10.4
Conservative	Jack Donalson	196	8.7	+0.4
Liberal Democrats	Tracy Connell	122	5.4	+2.0
Green	Pat McGee	119	5.3	+2.1
Rejected ballots		14	0.6	
Majority		218	9.7	
Turnout		2,255	31.7	
Registered electors		7,112		
Labour gain from Newcastle Ind.		Swing		

=== Manor Park ===
Manor Park
Party	Candidate	Votes	%	±%
Liberal Democrats	Greg Stone*	1,816	56.4	+2.8
Labour	Bradley Aird	836	26.0	−3.3
Green	Mike Rabley	405	12.6	+4.4
Conservative	Antonio Manco	161	5.0	−3.9
Rejected ballots		20	0.6	
Majority		980	30.4	
Turnout		3,218	45.3	
Registered electors		7,101		
Liberal Democrats hold		Swing		

=== Monument ===
Monument
Party	Candidate	Votes	%	±%
Labour	Nabeela Ali	804	56.9	−6.3
Green	Jessica Whitaker	343	24.3	+7.3
Conservative	Richard Sanderson	141	10.0	−1.2
Liberal Democrats	Craig Dodd	125	8.8	+0.2
Rejected ballots		24	1.7	
Majority		461	32.6	
Turnout		1,413	26.9	
Registered electors		5,255		
Labour hold		Swing		

=== North Jesmond ===
North Jesmond
Party	Candidate	Votes	%	±%
Liberal Democrats	James Coles	995	48.1	−17.0
Labour Co-op	Killian McCartney	683	33.0	+5.1
Green	Shehla Naqvi	262	12.7	+3.9
Conservative	Stephen Dawes	127	6.1	+2.2
Rejected ballots		10	0.5	
Majority		312	15.1	
Turnout		2,067	46.1	
Registered electors		4,484		
Liberal Democrats gain from Labour		Swing		

=== Ouseburn ===
Ouseburn
Party	Candidate	Votes	%	±%
Labour Co-op	Alistair Chisholm*	1,054	48.4	+10.7
Liberal Democrats	Fiona Punchard	762	35.0	−14.7
Green	Gabriella Leavitt	318	14.6	+4.6
Conservative	Marie Summersby	44	2.0	−0.6
Rejected ballots		23	1.1	
Majority		292	13.4	
Turnout		2,178	40.3	
Registered electors		5,411		
Labour Co-op hold		Swing		

=== Parklands ===
Parklands
Party	Candidate	Votes	%	±%
Liberal Democrats	Pauline Allen*	2,207	53.0	−1.2
Labour Co-op	Christopher Bartlett	999	24.0	+1.4
Green	Audrey MacNaughton	548	13.2	+3.6
Conservative	Andrew Burnett	409	9.8	−3.8
Rejected ballots		29	0.7	
Majority		1208	29.0	
Turnout		4,163	46.8	
Registered electors		8,900		
Liberal Democrats hold		Swing		

=== South Jesmond ===
South Jesmond
Party	Candidate	Votes	%	±%
Labour Co-op	Milo Barnett	900	42.1	−3.4
Liberal Democrats	Aidan King	548	25.6	−0.6
Green	Sarah Peters	454	21.2	+7.4
Conservative	Jennifer Mills	183	8.6	−1.2
SDP	Martin Evison	52	2.4	−2.3
Rejected ballots		18	0.8	
Majority		352	16.5	
Turnout		2,137	40.5	
Registered electors		5,271		
Labour Co-op hold		Swing		

=== Walker ===
Walker
Party	Candidate	Votes	%	±%
Labour	David Wood*	1,257	69.8	−0.5
Conservative	Alex Walker	232	12.9	−0.3
Green	Matt Williams	169	9.4	+3.9
Liberal Democrats	Stephen Psallidas	143	7.9	+2.2
Rejected ballots		21	1.2	
Majority		1,025	56.9	
Turnout		1,801	25.5	
Registered electors		7,064		
Labour hold		Swing		

=== Walkergate ===
Walkergate
Party	Candidate	Votes	%	±%
Labour	Maureen Lowson*	1,582	58.6	−1.0
Green	Margaret Montgomery	471	17.4	+11.3
Conservative	Stephen Oxborough	324	12.0	−0.5
Liberal Democrats	Matthew Osbourn	323	12.0	−4.4
Rejected ballots		33	1.2	
Majority		1,111	41.1	
Turnout		2,700	32.4	
Registered electors		8,325		
Labour hold		Swing		

=== West Fenham ===
West Fenham
Party	Candidate	Votes	%	±%
Liberal Democrats	Mark Mitchell	1,250	46.9	+1.6
Labour Co-op	Ian Tokell*	908	34.0	+0.7
Green	Tim Dowson	317	11.9	+3.0
Conservative	Syed Ahmed	193	7.2	−5.2
Rejected ballots		37	1.4	
Majority		342	12.8	
Turnout		2,668	36.5	
Registered electors		7,304		
Liberal Democrats gain from Labour Co-op		Swing		

=== Wingrove ===
Wingrove
Party	Candidate	Votes	%	±%
Labour	Irim Ali*	1,211	39.5	−27.8
Independent	Younes Mohammed	971	31.7	New
Green	John Pearson	468	15.3	+1.2
Conservative	Jarred Riley	223	7.3	−3.3
Liberal Democrats	Colin Steen	192	6.3	−1.7
Rejected ballots		26	0.8	
Majority		240	7.8	
Turnout		3,065	41.6	+9.8
Registered electors		7,361		
Labour hold		Swing		

== Aftermath ==
Despite losses, Labour retained their majority on Newcastle City Council. Labour council leader Nick Kemp called the results "mixed and in some cases, entirely surprising" whilst also alleging that "very disconcerting and worrying campaigns" were run in this year's election. He declined to elaborate further on this.

Liberal Democrat group leader Colin Ferguson suggested the concurrent mayoral election had "changed the pattern of how people normally voted."

Kemp faced a challenge for the Labour leadership on 8 May 2024 from Cllr Dan Greenhough. Greenhough was described by local media as a "strong backer" of Newcastle North MP Catherine McKinnell and the newly elected North East mayor Kim McGuinness. It was reported that Nick Kemp defeated Dan Greenhough by a margin of 23 votes to 21.

Nick Kemp reshuffled his cabinet on 23 May 2024, with Cllr Abdul Samad and Cllr Adam Walker joining the council's cabinet. Samad had defeated the then leader of the council, Nick Forbes, in a selection meeting for the Arthur's Hill ward in 2022, leading to Forbes leaving the council and his role as leader.

== Changes between 2024 and 2026 ==
- July 2024: Gerry Keating (Liberal Democrats) resigned as a North Jesmond councillor on health grounds, triggering a by-election.
- September 2024: Peter Allen (Liberal Democrats) won the North Jesmond by-election.
- September–October 2024: Nick Kemp resigned as council leader on 20 September and Karen Kilgour was appointed in his place on 2 October, becoming the council's first female leader.
- October 2024: Thom Campion, who had been elected as a Liberal Democrat, was suspended by the party and was thereafter listed by the council as an independent.
- November 2024: Nick Kemp, John Stokel-Walker, Marion Williams, David Wood, Margaret Wood and Stevie Wood left Labour to sit as independents, depriving Labour of its council majority.
- April 2025: Jane Byrne left Labour to sit as an independent.
- May 2025: The six councillors who had left Labour in November 2024 formed the East End and Associates Independents group, led by Marion Williams.
- July 2025: Milo Barnett (Labour) resigned as a South Jesmond councillor for work reasons, triggering a by-election.
- August 2025: Sarah Peters (Green Party) gained the South Jesmond seat from Labour.
- November 2025: Alistair Chisholm left Labour and joined the Green Party.
- January 2026: Lesley Storey and Paul Frew (both Labour) resigned as councillors. Their seats remained vacant because of the proximity of the May 2026 all-out election.

=== By-elections ===
==== North Jesmond ====
The by-election followed the resignation of Liberal Democrat councillor Gerry Keating on health grounds.

North Jesmond by-election, 12 September 2024
Party	Candidate	Votes	%	±%
Liberal Democrats	Peter Allen	740	64.5	+16.4
Labour	Callum Buchanan	234	20.4	−12.6
Green	Shehla Naqvi	93	8.1	−4.6
Conservative	Stephen Dawes	35	3.1	−3.0
Reform	Anas El-Hamri	26	2.3	N/A
Party of Women	Liz Panton	19	1.7	N/A
Majority		506	44.1	+29.0
Turnout		1,147	23.8	−22.3
Registered electors		4,820		
Liberal Democrats hold		Swing	14.5	

==== South Jesmond ====
The by-election followed the resignation of Labour councillor Milo Barnett for work reasons.

South Jesmond by-election, 14 August 2025
Party	Candidate	Votes	%	±%
Green	Sarah Peters	578	36.4	+15.2
Liberal Democrats	June Browne	523	33.0	+7.4
Labour	Owen Bell	267	16.8	−25.3
Reform	Gavin Maw	173	10.9	N/A
Conservative	Stephen Dawes	45	2.8	−5.8
Rejected ballots		4	0.3	−0.5
Majority		55	3.4	−13.1
Turnout		1,590	30.8	−9.7
Registered electors		5,169		
Green gain from Labour		Swing	20.3	
