= 2015 Newcastle City Council election =

2015 UK local government election

Newcastle City Council Elections, 2015
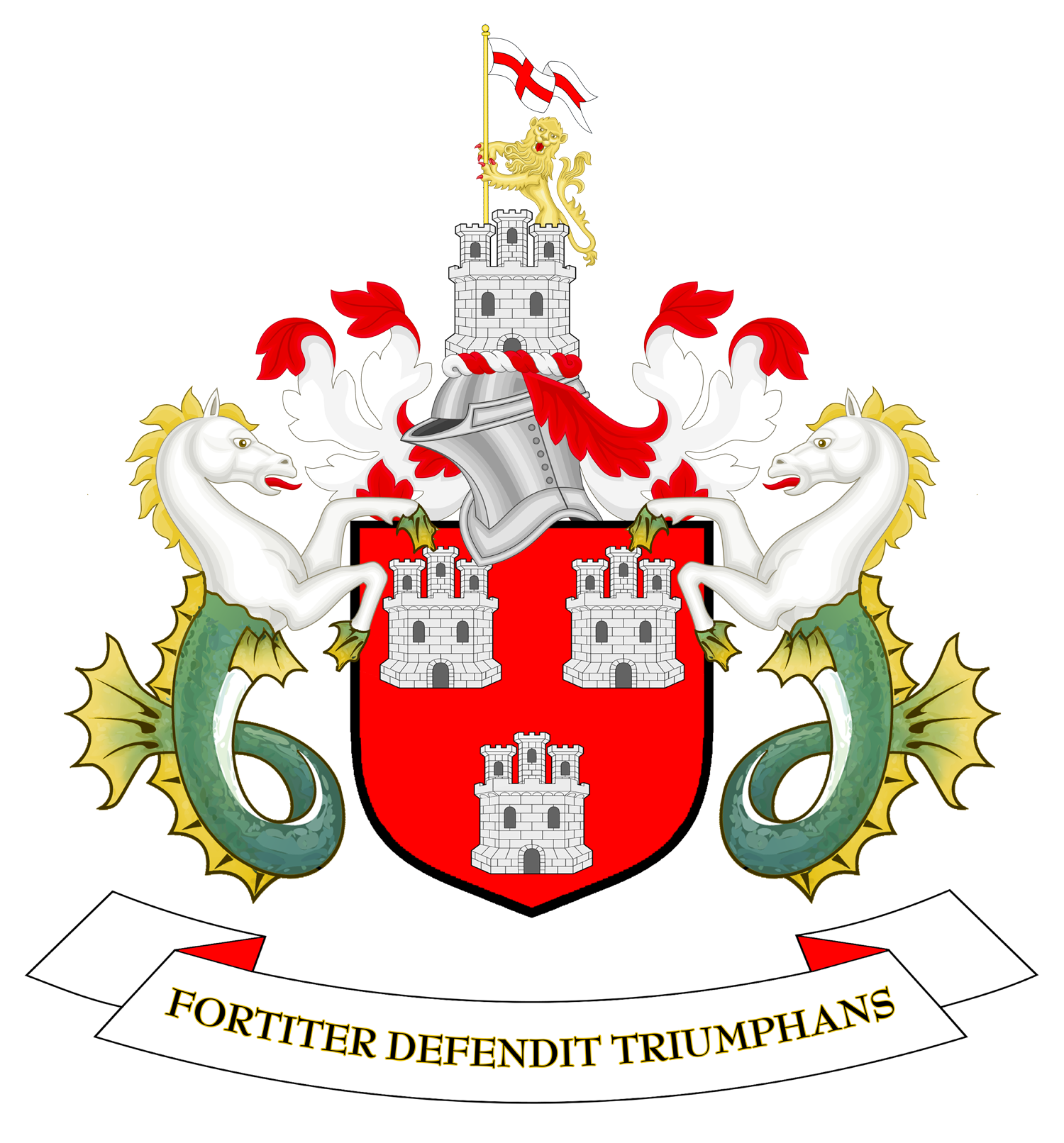
- 7 May 2015
- Turnout: 65%
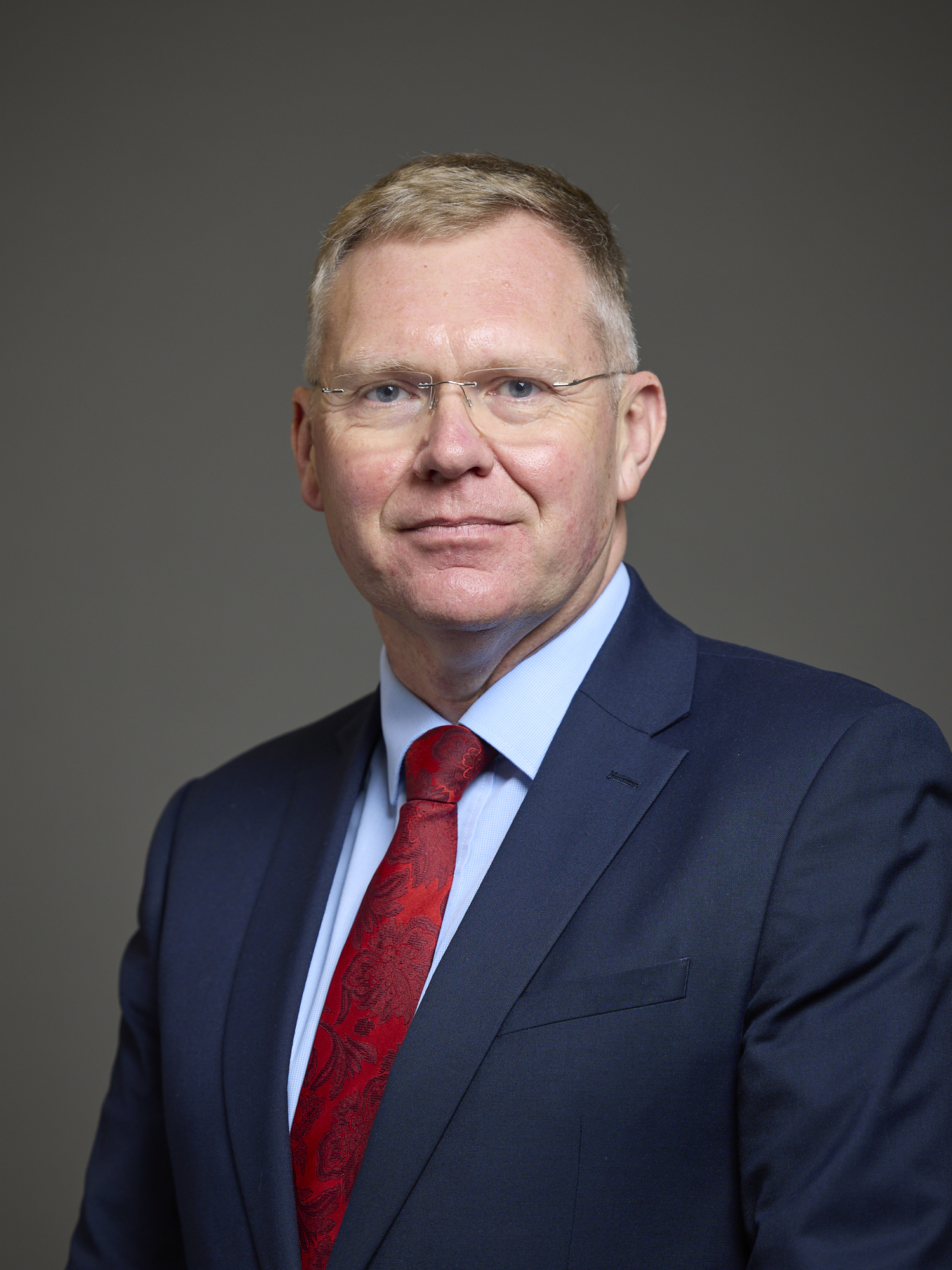
	First party	Second party	Third party
Leader	Nick Forbes	Anita Lower
Party	Labour	Liberal Democrats	Independent
Leader's seat	Westgate	Castle
Last election	51	25	2
Popular vote	57,144	22,607	2,896
Percentage	45.0%	17.8%	2.3%
Swing		▼1%
Councillors	53	22	3
Councillors +/–	▲2	▼3	▲1
	Fourth party	Fifth party	Sixth party
Party	Conservative	UKIP	Green
Last election	0	0	0
Seats won	0	0	0
Popular vote	17,936	15,991	6,950
Percentage	14.1%	12.6%	6.3%
Councillors	0	0	0
Councillors +/–	±0	±0	±0

The 2015 Newcastle City Council Council election took place on 7 May 2015 to elect one third of the members of Newcastle City Council in England. The elections took place on the same day as other local elections.

During the election campaign, hustings were held by JesmondLocal in the North and South Jesmond Wards.

The result saw the majority of governing Labour Party members increase in the council chamber, with winners in seats in the wards Castle and North Jesmond replacing one Liberal Democrat councillor in each for these. Westerhope saw its third independent councillor elected, Pat Hillicks winning the seat with a 1,319 majority over the Labour Party candidate.

In West Gosforth, the Conservative candidate Steve Kyte came close to victory, the last such occasion being 1992, coming 17 votes short. UKIP candidates attracted more support on average than in any previous year, coming second in Byker and in Lemington.

== Overall results ==
Newcastle City Council election, 2015
Party	Seats				Popular vote	
Party	Won	Not up	Total	±	Votes	Percentage
Labour	22	31	53	+2	57,144	45.0%
Liberal Democrats	4	18	22	-3	22,607	17.8%
Independent	1	2	3	+1	2,896	2.3%
Conservative	0	0	0	±0	17,936	14.1%
UKIP	0	0	0	±0	15,991	12.6%
Green	0	0	0	±0	7,950	6.3%
Newcastle First	0	0	0	±0	1,785	1.4%
TUSC	0	0	0	±0	763	0.6%
Total	27	51	78	±0	127,072	–
Turnout						65%

== Ward results ==
The electoral division results are listed below:

Local elections 2015: Benwell and Scotswood
Party	Candidate	Votes	%	±%
Labour	Hazel Stephenson	2,773	57.8	−10.7
UKIP	Michael Scott	1,137	23.7	+23.7
Conservative	Neville Armstrong	508	10.6	+0.3
Green	Lee Irving	203	4.2	+4.2
Liberal Democrats	Roland Clark	178	3.7	−6.4
Majority		1,636	34.1	−23.3
Turnout		4,799	56	+19.6
Labour hold		Swing		

Local elections 2015: Blakelaw
Party	Candidate	Votes	%	±%
Labour	Sue Pearson	2,549	55.4	−3.9
UKIP	Daniel Percy	846	18.4	+18.4
Conservative	James Langley	532	11.6	+4.1
Liberal Democrats	Bill Schardt	428	9.3	−23.7
Green	Brendan Derham	244	5.3	+5.3
Majority		1,703	37.0	+10.9
Turnout		4,599	56	+15.0
Labour hold		Swing		

Local elections 2015: Byker
Party	Candidate	Votes	%	±%
Labour	Anne Dunn	2,373	59.0	−13.6
UKIP	Raymond Hardy	804	20.0	+20.0
Conservative	Donald Robinson	389	9.7	+5.1
Green	Cat Lyth	225	5.6	+5.6
Liberal Democrats	Mark Nelson	172	4.3	−1.8
TUSC	Ryan Holmes	56	1.4	+1.4
Majority		1,569	39.0	24.9
Turnout		4,019	51	
Labour hold		Swing		

Local elections 2015: Castle
Party	Candidate	Votes	%	±%
Labour	Brian Hunter	2,200	36.4	+4.7
Liberal Democrats	Phillip Lower	1,974	32.6	−13.1
Conservative	Mary Toward	990	16.4	+2.4
UKIP	Tim Marron	886	14.6	+14.6
Majority		226	3.7	
Turnout		6,050	70.0	+24.9
Labour gain from Liberal Democrats		Swing		

Local elections 2015: Dene
Party	Candidate	Votes	%	±%
Liberal Democrats	Bob Renton	2,086	38.7	−10.8
Labour	Sheila Spencer	1,730	32.1	+5.1
Conservative	James Bartle	755	14.0	−0.5
UKIP	Tony Sanderson	463	8.6	+8.6
Green	Tom Targett	350	6.5	+6.5
Majority		356	6.6	
Turnout		5,384	72.8	+25.9
Liberal Democrats hold		Swing		

Local elections 2015: Denton
Party	Candidate	Votes	%	±%
Labour	Simon Bird	2,306		
Labour	Melissa Davies	1,995		
UKIP	Will Solyom	999		
Liberal Democrats	Colin Daglish	673		
Conservative	Alan Birkmyre	670		
Conservative	Colin Foster	499		
Newcastle First	Jason Smith	467		
Liberal Democrats	Helen Laverick	380		
Turnout		7,985		
Labour hold		Swing		
Labour hold		Swing		

Local elections 2015: East Gosforth
Party	Candidate	Votes	%	±%
Liberal Democrats	Henry Gallagher	1,951	36.0	−5.0
Labour	Ed Derrick	1,733	31.9	−3.1
Conservative	Alison Wake	935	17.2	+4.0
Green	Joe Herbert	537	9.9	−0.8
UKIP	Tony Coxall	214	3.9	+3.9
TUSC	Nicholas Fray	55	1.0	+1.0
Majority		218	4.0	−1.9
Turnout		5425	75.6	
Liberal Democrats hold		Swing		

Local elections 2015: Elswick
Party	Candidate	Votes	%	±%
Labour	Dipu Ahad	2,644	68.2	−10.8
UKIP	David Muat	623	16.1	+16.1
Conservative	Ronald Toward	240	6.2	+0.7
Green	Jacob Strauss	170	4.4	+4.4
Liberal Democrats	Judith Fourie	143	3.7	−0.5
Newcastle First	Olga Shorton	58	1.5	−8.1
Majority		2,021	52.1	−17.3
Turnout		3,878	55.6	
Labour hold		Swing		

Local elections 2015: Fawdon
Party	Candidate	Votes	%	±%
Labour	Antoine Tinnion	1,919	42.6	+3.7
Liberal Democrats	Tracy Connell	1,409	31.3	−19.3
UKIP	Alexis Fernandes	637	14.2	+14.2
Conservative	Steve Axford	365	8.1	+5.2
Green	Liam Christie	170	3.8	+3.8
Majority		510	12.0	−11.7
Turnout		4,500	61.3	
Labour hold		Swing		

Local elections 2015: Fenham
Party	Candidate	Votes	%	±%
Labour	Ian Tokell	2,506	52.4	+0.2
UKIP	Peter Grey	1,025	21.4	+21.4
Conservative	Ken Wake	632	13.2	+2.3
Liberal Democrats	PJ Morrissey	407	8.5	−16.7
Green	Jess Poyner	212	4.4	+4.4
Majority		1,481	31.0	+6.0
Turnout		4,782	60.5	
Labour hold		Swing		

Local elections 2015: Kenton
Party	Candidate	Votes	%	±%
Labour	Stephen Lambert	2,647	58.6	−12.1
UKIP	Penelope Stansfield	678	15.0	+15.0
Conservative	Simon Bell	646	14.3	+0.2
Liberal Democrats	Barbara Down	286	6.3	−8.9
Green	Helena Rohlfing	190	4.2	+4.2
TUSC	Oisin Gourley	70	1.5	+1.5
Majority		1,969	43.6	−11.9
Turnout		4,517	56.3	
Labour hold		Swing		

Local elections 2015: Lemington
Party	Candidate	Votes	%	±%
Labour	Barry Phillipson	2,158		
Labour	Kim McGuinness	2,052		
UKIP	Mike Adie	1,042		
Liberal Democrats	Lawrence Hunter	672		
Conservative	Kieran McNally	501		
Newcastle First	Sarah Armstrong	414		
Conservative	Emmett McNally	414		
Liberal Democrats	Ian Laverick	298		
Turnout		7,551		
Labour hold		Swing		
Labour hold		Swing		

Local elections 2015: Newburn
Party	Candidate	Votes	%	±%
Labour	Hillary Franks	2,024	45.5	
UKIP	James Robertson	908	20.4	
Conservative	Dorothy Wonnacott	505	11.4	
Liberal Democrats	James Kenyon	321	7.2	
Independent	Idwal John	232	5.2	
Green	Claire Henly	157	3.5	
Newcastle First	John Gordon	154	3.5	
Independent	Jennifer Nixon	146	3.3	
Majority		1,116	25.1	
Turnout		4,447	62.7	
Labour hold		Swing		

Local elections 2015: North Heaton
Party	Candidate	Votes	%	±%
Labour	Mick Bowman	1,926	37.0	
Liberal Democrats	Christine Morrissey	1,869	35.9	
Conservative	Heather Chambers	502	9.6	
Green	Chris Hayday	468	9.0	
UKIP	Elisabeth Edmundson	397	7.6	
TUSC	Lizi Gray	49	0.9	
Majority		57	1.1	
Turnout		5,211	72.8	
Labour gain from Liberal Democrats		Swing		

Local elections 2015: North Jesmond
Party	Candidate	Votes	%	±%
Labour	Dan Perry	1,501	33.6	
Liberal Democrats	Gerard Keating	1,312	29.3	
Conservative	Matthew Sinclair	925	20.7	
Green	Shehla Naqvi	549	12.3	
UKIP	Joseph Levy	129	2.9	
Independent	Michael Charlton	57	1.3	
Majority		189	4.2	
Turnout		4,473	58.3	
Labour hold		Swing		

Local elections 2015: Ouseburn
Party	Candidate	Votes	%	±%
Labour	Steven Powers	1,802	43.0	
Liberal Democrats	Stephen Howse	906	21.6	
Green	Cameron Christian	722	17.2	
Conservative	Toby Millar	457	10.9	
UKIP	David Robinson Young	258	6.2	
TUSC	Matt Wilson-Boddy	44	1.1	
Majority		896	21.4	
Turnout		4,189	58.4	
Labour gain from Liberal Democrats		Swing		

Local elections 2015: Parklands
Party	Candidate	Votes	%	±%
Liberal Democrats	David Down	2,477	42.9	
Labour	Shumel Rahman	1,376	23.8	
Conservative	Karen Jewers	1,237	21.4	
UKIP	John Atkinson	400	6.9	
Green	Alistar Ford	283	4.9	
Majority		1,101	19.1	
Turnout		5,773	73.1	
Liberal Democrats hold		Swing		

Local elections 2015: South Heaton
Party	Candidate	Votes	%	±%
Labour	Denise Jones	1,987	48.5	
Green	Andrew Gray	1,163	28.4	
Conservative	Tim Monckton	350	8.5	
Liberal Democrats	Catherine Smith	274	6.7	
UKIP	James Askwith	267	6.5	
TUSC	Paul Phillips	59	1.4	
Majority		824	20.1	
Turnout		4,100	60.1	
Labour hold		Swing		

Local elections 2015: South Jesmond
Party	Candidate	Votes	%	±%
Labour	Kerry Allibhai	1,522	39.9	
Conservative	Sam Lee	758	19.8	
Green	Robert Magowan	676	17.7	
Liberal Democrats	Tom Woodwark	617	16.2	
UKIP	Norman Douglas	198	5.2	
TUSC	Geoff Stokle	48	1.3	
Majority		764	20.0	
Turnout		3,819	54.8	
Labour hold		Swing		

Local elections 2015: Walker
Party	Candidate	Votes	%	±%
Labour	Margaret Wood	2,573	65.8	
UKIP	Glen Bolton	829	21.2	
Conservative	Joan Atkin	251	6.4	
Liberal Democrats	Christopher Boyle	133	3.4	
Green	Josh Adams	126	3.2	
Majority		1,744	44.6	
Turnout		3,912	49.8	
Labour hold		Swing		

Local elections 2015: Walkergate
Party	Candidate	Votes	%	±%
Labour	David Denholm	2,410	53.3	
UKIP	Joseph Todd	968	21.4	
Liberal Democrats	David Besag	537	11.9	
Conservative	Marian McWilliams	450	10.0	
Green	Thomas Rhodes	155	3.4	
Majority		1,442	31.9	
Turnout		4,520	64.3	
Labour hold		Swing		

Local elections 2015: West Gosforth
Party	Candidate	Votes	%	±%
Liberal Democrats	Jackie Slesenger	1,821	32.2	
Conservative	Steve Kyte	1,804	31.9	
Labour	Oscar Avery	1,318	23.3	
Green	Sandy Irvine	441	7.8	
UKIP	Daniel Thompson	269	4.8	
Majority		17	0.3	
Turnout		5,653	76.1	
Liberal Democrats hold		Swing		

Local elections 2015: Westerhope
Party	Candidate	Votes	%	±%
Independent	Pat Hillicks	2,443	44.6	+19.1
Labour	Syed Ullah	1,124	20.5	−12.7
UKIP	Stewart Jackson	643	11.7	
Newcastle First	Ernie Shorton	585	10.7	−5.3
Conservative	Jacqueline McNally	450	8.2	+1.0
Liberal Democrats	Colin Steen	140	2.6	−12.2
Green	David Tooby	73	1.3	+1.3
Independent	William Jobes	18	0.3	+0.3
Majority		1,319	24.1	
Turnout		5,476	72.4	
Independent gain from Labour		Swing	+15.9	

Local elections 2015: Westgate
Party	Candidate	Votes	%	±%
Labour	Joanne Kingsland	1,771	55.7	−16.9
Conservative	Robert Moore	499	15.7	+4.6
Green	Cliff Broen	254	14.3	+14.3
UKIP	Shawkat Al-Baghdadi	239	7.5	+7.5
Liberal Democrats	Rachel Cullen	217	6.8	+6.8
Majority		1,272	40.0	
Turnout		3,180	54.7	
Labour hold		Swing	-10.8	

Local elections 2015: Wingrove
Party	Candidate	Votes	%	±%
Labour	Nigel Todd	2,527	62.5	
Conservative	William Kinghorn	540	13.3	
Green	John Pearson	485	278	
UKIP	Christopher Ballantyne	278	6.9	
Liberal Democrats	Mohammed Farsi	215	5.3	
Majority		1,987	49.1	
Turnout		4,045	59.2	
Labour hold		Swing		

Local elections 2015: Woolsington
Party	Candidate	Votes	%	±%
Labour	Jacqui Robinson	2,284	51.7	
UKIP	Paul Armstrong	884	20.0	
Conservative	Julian Toward	673	15.2	
Liberal Democrats	Phillip McArdle	341	7.7	
Green	Tab Bailey	132	3.0	
Newcastle First	Alan McKenna	107	2.4	
Majority		1,400	31.7	
Turnout		4,421	56.7	
Labour hold		Swing		
