= 2014 Newcastle City Council election =

2014 UK local government election

Newcastle City Council Elections, 2014
- 22 May 2014
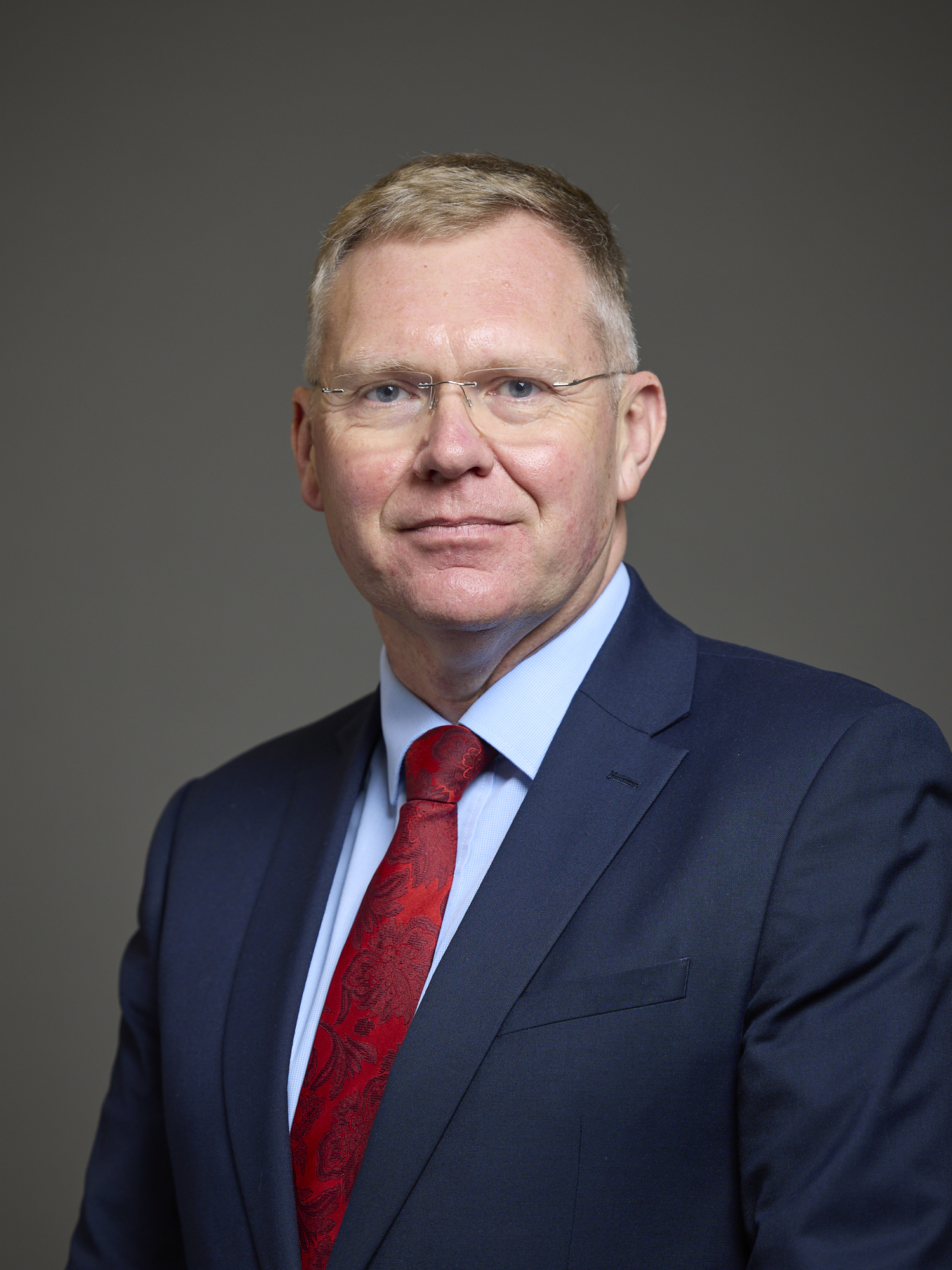
	First party	Second party	Third party
Leader	Nick Forbes	Anita Lower
Party	Labour	Liberal Democrats	Independent
Leader's seat	Westgate	Castle
Last election	51	26	1
Popular vote	32,129	15,068	1,343
Percentage	45.0%	21.7%
Swing		▼1%
Councillors	52	24	2
Councillors +/–	▲1	▼2	▲1
	Fourth party	Fifth party	Sixth party
Party	UKIP	Conservative	Green
Last election	0	0	0
Seats won	0	0	0
Popular vote	9,231	6,985	2,055
Percentage	13.5%	9.9%	3.0%
Councillors	0	0	0
Councillors +/–	±0	±0	±0

The 2014 Newcastle City Council election took place on 22 May 2014 to elect members of Newcastle City Council in England. This was on the same day as other local elections.

The election saw the governing Labour Party gain a net extra seat in the council chambers, gaining the wards of Denton and South Jesmond. An Independent councillor was also elected in Westerhope, with Bill Corbett winning with a 451 majority over the Labour Party.

The Conservatives improved their performance from previous years, coming second in wards where they were previously third. The election also saw UKIP field candidates around the city. The party came second in wards including Byker and Lemington.

== Overall Results ==
Newcastle City Council election, 2014
Party	Seats				Popular vote	
Party	Won	Not up	Total	±	Votes	Percentage
Labour	17	35	52	+1	32,129	45.0%
Liberal Democrats	9	15	24	-2	15,068	21.7%
Independent	1	1	2	+1	1,343	
UKIP	0	0	0	±0	9,231	13.5%
Conservative	0	0	0	±0	6,985	9.9%
Green	0	0	0	±0	0	
Newcastle First	0	0	0	±0		
TUSC	0	0	0	±0		
British Democrats	0	0	0	±0		
Total	27	51	78	±0	68,634	–
Turnout						34.2%

== Ward by Ward Results ==
Local elections 2014: Benwell and Scotswood
Party	Candidate	Votes	%	±%
Labour	Jeremy Beecham	1,502		
UKIP	Elisabeth Edmundson	823		
Conservative	Neville Armstrong	219		
Green	Lee Irving	136		
Liberal Democrats	Ronald Clark	117		
Majority		679		
Turnout				
Labour hold		Swing		

Local elections 2014: Blakelaw
Party	Candidate	Votes	%	±%
Labour	Ben Riley	1,897		
Liberal Democrats	Bill Schardt	485		
Conservative	James Langley	308		
Majority		1,589		
Turnout				
Labour hold		Swing		

Local elections 2014: Byker
Party	Candidate	Votes	%	±%
Labour	Nick Kemp	1,275		
UKIP	Ray Hardy	624		
Conservative	Donald Robinson	130		
Liberal Democrats	James Kenyon	92		
TUSC	Ryan Holmes	70		
Majority		651		
Turnout				
Labour hold		Swing		

Local elections 2014: Castle
Party	Candidate	Votes	%	±%
Liberal Democrats	Anita Lower	1,270		
Labour	Kim McGuinness	1,106		
UKIP	Tim Marron	701		
Conservative	Mary Toward	270		
Majority		164		
Turnout				
Liberal Democrats hold		Swing		

Local elections 2014: Dene
Party	Candidate	Votes	%	±%
Liberal Democrats	Karen Robinson	1,363		
Labour	Sheila Spencer	992		
Conservative	Heather Chambers	462		
TUSC	Ian Cusack	180		
Majority		371		
Turnout				
Liberal Democrats hold		Swing		

Local elections 2014: Denton
Party	Candidate	Votes	%	±%
Labour	Anna Round	1,332		
Newcastle First	Ian Fraser	679		
Liberal Democrats	Sarah Cross	405		
Conservative	Alan Birkmyre	296		
Majority		653		
Majority		996		
Turnout				
Labour gain from Liberal Democrats		Swing		

Local elections 2014: East Gosforth
Party	Candidate	Votes	%	±%
Liberal Democrats	David Slesenger	1,199		
Labour	Dan Greenhough	1,004		
Conservative	Joseph Gallagher	377		
Green	Frances Hinton	336		
UKIP	Mike Adie	266		
Majority		195		
Turnout				
Liberal Democrats hold		Swing		

Local elections 2014: Elswick
Party	Candidate	Votes	%	±%
Labour	Habib Rahman	1,522		
British Democrats	Kenny Baldwin	414		
Conservative	Ronald Toward	165		
Liberal Democrats	Ian Laverick	143		
Majority		1,108		
Turnout				
Labour hold		Swing		

Local elections 2014: Fawdon
Party	Candidate	Votes	%	±%
Liberal Democrats	David Faulkner	1,253		
Labour	Heather Michell	947		
UKIP	Ray Thomson	521		
Conservative	Stephen Axford	108		
Majority		306		
Turnout				
Liberal Democrats hold		Swing		

Local elections 2014: Fenham
Party	Candidate	Votes	%	±%
Labour	Karen Kigour	1,428		
UKIP	Lorraine Smith	746		
Conservative	Keran McNally	263		
Liberal Democrats	Tona Atkinson	229		
Green	Jess Poyner	121		
Majority		682		
Turnout				
Labour hold		Swing		

Local elections 2014: Kenton
Party	Candidate	Votes	%	±%
Labour	Ged Bell	1,733		
Conservative	Alison Wake	431		
Liberal Democrats	Tracey Connell	349		
Majority		1,402		
Turnout				
Labour hold		Swing		

Local elections 2014: Lemington
Party	Candidate	Votes	%	±%
Labour	David Cook	1,146		
UKIP	Alexis Fernandes	672		
Liberal Democrats	Lawrence Hunter	397		
Conservative	Emmett McNally	183		
Majority		472		
Turnout				
Labour hold		Swing		

Local elections 2014: Newburn
Party	Candidate	Votes	%	±%
Labour	Linda Wright	1,140		
UKIP	Christopher Ballantyne	564		
Newcastle First	John Gordon	258		
Conservative	Kenneth Wake	214		
Liberal Democrats	Barbara Down	159		
Independent	Idwal John	149		
Majority		576		
Turnout				
Labour hold		Swing		

Local elections 2014: North Heaton
Party	Candidate	Votes	%	±%
Liberal Democrats	Greg Stone	1,454		
Labour	Mick Bowman	1,149		
UKIP	Helen Jordan	402		
Conservative	James Bartle	204		
TUSC	Lizi Gray	114		
Majority		305		
Turnout				
Liberal Democrats hold		Swing		

Local elections 2014: North Jesmond
Party	Candidate	Votes	%	±%
Liberal Democrats	Catherine Walker	621		
Labour	Peter Smith	589		
Green	Tim Dowson	277		
Conservative	Duncan Crute	276		
UKIP	Will Solyom	129		
Majority		22		
Turnout				
Liberal Democrats hold		Swing		

Local elections 2014: Ouseburn
Party	Candidate	Votes	%	±%
Liberal Democrats	Gareth Kane	917		
Labour	Jane Byrne	887		
UKIP	Daniel Cooke	164		
Conservative	Christos Mexias	96		
TUSC	Rober Hooper	93		
Majority		896		
Turnout				
Liberal Democrats hold		Swing		

Local elections 2014: Parklands
Party	Candidate	Votes	%	±%
Liberal Democrats	Robin Ashby	1,549		
Labour	Ian Tokell	773		
Conservative	Karen Jewers	547		
UKIP	Alora Adie	393		
Majority		776		
Turnout				
Liberal Democrats hold		Swing		

Local elections 2014: South Heaton
Party	Candidate	Votes	%	±%
Labour	Sophie White	1,095		
Green	Andrew Gray	519		
UKIP	James Robertson	209		
Liberal Democrats	131 Boyle	274		
Conservative	Samuel Boam	99		
TUSC	Paul Phillips	45		
Majority		576		
Turnout				
Labour hold		Swing		

Local elections 2014: South Jesmond
Party	Candidate	Votes	%	±%
Labour	Arlene Ainsley	752		
Liberal Democrats	Tom Woodwark	396		
Green	Tony Waterson	279		
Conservative	Sam Lee	236		
UKIP	Penny Stansfield	164		
Majority		356		
Turnout				
Labour gain from Liberal Democrats		Swing		

Local elections 2015: Walker
Party	Candidate	Votes	%	±%
Labour	John Stokel-Walker	1,573		
UKIP	Eric Taylorson	580		
Liberal Democrats	Gerry Keating	85		
Conservative	Joan Atkin	52		
TUSC	Bobbie Cranney	63		
Majority		993		
Turnout				
Labour hold		Swing		

Local elections 2015: Walkergate
Party	Candidate	Votes	%	±%
Labour	Maureen Lowson	1,276		
UKIP	Joseph Todd	843		
Liberal Democrats	David Besag	372		
Conservative	Marian McWilliams	146		
Communist	Martin Levy	33		
Majority		433		
Turnout				
Labour hold		Swing		

Local elections 2014: West Gosforth
Party	Candidate	Votes	%	±%
Liberal Democrats	Bill Shepherd	1,226		
Conservative	Steve Kyte	735		
Labour	Ed Derrick	701		
UKIP	Daniel Thompson	476		
Green	Sandy Irvine	243		
Majority		491		
Turnout				
Liberal Democrats hold		Swing		

Local elections 2014: Westerhope
Party	Candidate	Votes	%	±%
Independent	Bill Corbett	1,343		
Newcastle First	Ernie Shorton	892		
Labour	Brian Hunter	818		
UKIP	Charlotte Johnston	393		
Conservative	Dorothy Wonnacott	125		
Liberal Democrats	Hans-Christian Andersen	64		
Majority		451		
Turnout				
Independent gain from Labour		Swing		

Local elections 2014: Westgate
Party	Candidate	Votes	%	±%
Labour	Geoff O'Brien	1,118		
Conservative	Alex Staton	218		
TUSC	Cliff Broen	254		
Liberal Democrats	Claire Schofield	142		
Majority		900		
Turnout				
Labour hold		Swing		

Local elections 2014: Wingrove
Party	Candidate	Votes	%	±%
Labour	Joyce McCarty	1,592		
Green	John Pearson	401		
Conservative	Anisha Malik	325		
Liberal Democrats	Mark Nelson	119		
Majority		1,191		
Turnout				
Labour hold		Swing		

Local elections 2014: Wingrove
Party	Candidate	Votes	%	±%
Labour	George Pattison	1,467		
Labour	Jacqui Robinson	1,315		
UKIP	Christopher Armstrong	646		
Liberal Democrats	Phillip McArdle	306		
Conservative	Jacqueline McNally	278		
Liberal Democrats	Colin Daglish	237		
Conservative	Julian Toward	211		
Majority		821		
Majority		669		
Turnout				
Labour hold		Swing		
Labour hold		Swing		
