= Linda Wright =

British politician

Councillor Linda Wright
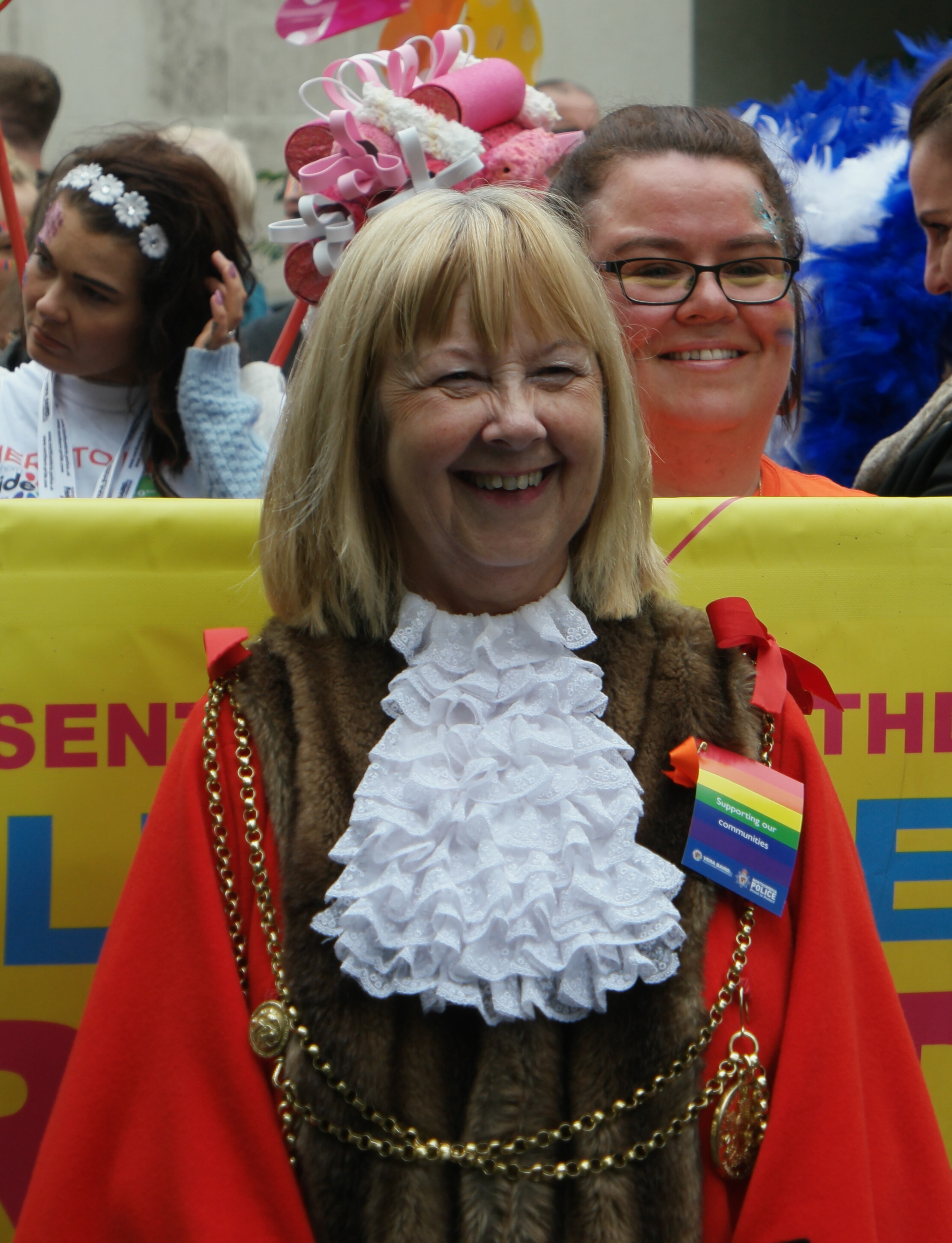

Lord Mayor of Newcastle Upon Tyne
- In office 31 May 2017 – 31 May 2018
- Deputy: David Down
- Preceded by: Hazel Stephenson
- Succeeded by: David Down

Sheriff and Deputy Lord Mayor of Newcastle upon Tyne
- In office 26 May 2016 – 31 May 2017
- Preceded by: Hazel Stephenson
- Succeeded by: David Down

Newcastle City Councillor for Newburn
- In office 7 November 1996 – 8 May 2026
- Preceded by: Bob Brown
- Succeeded by: Richard Barnes
- Majority: 576

Personal details
- Born: Linda Isabel Wright; 31 October 1950 (age 75) Throckley, United Kingdom
- Party: Labour
- Spouse: Colin Wright (m. 1975)
- Children: 3

Linda Isabel Wright (born 31 October 1950) is a British politician who became the Lord Mayor of Newcastle upon Tyne in 2017. She served as a Labour councillor from 1996 to 2026 representing Newburn, Throckley and Callerton depending on boundary changes.

== Early life and education ==
Wright was born in Throckley, a village in Newcastle upon Tyne. Her family had lived in the village for five generations, mainly working as miners, though her father was the first in many generations not to go down the pits. He trained as a fitter and turner, serving his apprenticeship with Vickers Armstrong, and worked at Spencer's Steel Works in Walbottle until retirement.

Wright was educated at the Walbottle Campus where she engaged in a two-year commercial course. She continued her education at Newcastle College of Further Education where she went on to gain high levels in shorthand and typing, skills which she has used for most of her working life.

== Professional career ==
Wright worked for ten years at Bainbridge, starting out as a Junior Secretary and finishing as Secretary to the Goodwill Manager. She left Bainbridge to have her two sons, later returning to work in 1987 in a role at Newcastle College. She had numerous roles at the College throughout her 26 years, retiring in December 2012. It was here that she completed her education studying for a National Certificate in IT Apps, which she achieved with Distinction; she had her last child 18 months after she started working at the College.

Wright later went back to work and spent four years working for the Academic Health Science Network as a PA, retiring at the end of March 2017.

== Political career ==
Wright has served continuously since 1996 as a Labour councillor for Newburn Ward on Newcastle City Council, having been first elected in a November 1996 by-election, called due to the death of the incumbent councillor Bob Brown. She was the 100th female councillor to be elected to Newcastle City Council.

Wright has held several council positions since 1996. She served as Chair of the Cityworks Committee, prior to the Leader and Cabinet form of council leadership, after which she became Cabinet Member for the Environment, her term ending when Labour lost control of the city in 2004. In opposition, she served on the Regulatory Committee, becoming its chair after Labour regained control of the council; she was re-elected to this role for the 2017-18 year.

For 10 years between 2006 and 2016, Wright was Secretary of the Labour Group, stepping down after being elected Sheriff and Deputy Lord Mayor. In 2017, she was elected as the Lord Mayor of Newcastle-upon-Tyne, an office held by her mother, Councillor Belle Nixon, 20 years prior. Her chosen charities for her term as Lord Mayor were Marie Curie, the Children's Heart Foundation at the Freeman Hospital, and the Nicole Rich Foundation.
