= Colin Ferguson (disambiguation) =

Colin Ferguson (born 1972) is a Canadian–American actor.

Colin Ferguson may also refer to:

- Colin Ferguson (politician) (born 1987), British politician, leader of Newcastle City Council
- Colin Ferguson (born 1958), American mass murderer and perpetrator of the 1993 Long Island Rail Road shooting
- Colin Ferguson, musician in Scottish band H_{2}O

== See also ==
- Colen Ferguson (fl. 1913–1917), American politician
