= 2007 Newcastle City Council election =

2007 UK local government election

- 3 May 2007

30 of the 78 seats on Newcastle City Council (including 4 by-elections) 40 seats needed for a majority
- Turnout: 38.9% (▼1.4)
	Majority party	Minority party
Party	Liberal Democrats	Labour
Seats before	50	28
Seats won	18	12
Seats after	47	31
Seat change	▼3	▲3
Popular vote	37,541	28,681
Percentage	46.1%	35.2%
Swing	▼1.7	▼0.3

Elections to Newcastle City Council were held on 3 May 2007. One third of the council was up for election, with each successful candidate to serve a four-year term of office, expiring in 2011. The council stayed under Liberal Democrat control.

== Election result ==
Newcastle Council Election Result 2007
Party	This election			Full council			This election		
Party	Seats	Net	Seats %	Other	Total	Total %	Votes	Votes %	+/−
Liberal Democrats	18	▼3	60.0	29	47	60.3	37,541	46.1	▼1.7
Labour	12	▲3	40.0	19	31	39.7	28,681	35.2	▼0.3
Conservative	0	Steady	0.0	0	0	0.0	9,300	11.4	▲1.9
BNP	0	Steady	0.0	0	0	0.0	3,253	4.0	▲1.3
Green	0	Steady	0.0	0	0	0.0	2,350	2.9	▼0.3
Independent	0	Steady	0.0	0	0	0.0	222	0.3	New
Respect	0	Steady	0.0	0	0	0.0	137	0.2	▼0.1
Communist	0	Steady	0.0	0	0	0.0	26	0.0	Steady

== Ward results ==
=== Benwell and Scotswood ===
Benwell and Scotswood
Party	Candidate	Votes	%	±%
Labour	Hazel Stephenson	1,648	54.4	+3.0
Liberal Democrats	Catherine Pagan	465	15.3	−11.4
Conservative	Maureen Smith	450	14.8	N/A
BNP	John Keys	319	10.5	−5.2
Green	Laurence Ellacot	149	4.9	−1.4
Registered electors		8,387		
Turnout			36.2	−4.2
Labour hold		Swing		

=== Blakelaw ===
Blakelaw
Party	Candidate	Votes	%	±%
Liberal Democrats	Philip Lower	1,511	50.9	−1.5
Labour	Oskar Avery	1,000	33.7	−6.1
BNP	Michael Roche	230	7.7	N/A
Conservative	Kenneth Wake	230	7.7	−0.1
Registered electors		7,729		
Turnout			38.6	−1.8
Liberal Democrats hold		Swing		

=== Byker ===
Byker
Party	Candidate	Votes	%	±%
Labour	Veronica Dunn	1,356	60.5	+1.0
Liberal Democrats	Simon Forrester	445	19.9	−7.6
BNP	Steve Shears	246	11.0	N/A
Conservative	Alice Gingell	194	8.7	N/A
Registered electors		7,055		
Turnout			31.9	+0.1
Labour hold		Swing		

=== Castle ===
Castle
Party	Candidate	Votes	%	±%
Liberal Democrats	Ian Laverick	1,830	59.4	+0.3
Conservative	Jennifer Du Cane	662	21.5	+6.4
Labour	Ash Nehmet	589	19.1	−6.7
Registered electors		7,317		
Turnout			42.1	+0.4
Liberal Democrats hold		Swing		

=== Dene ===
Dene
Party	Candidate	Votes	%	±%
Liberal Democrats	Robert Renton	1,846	62.4	−4.5
Labour	Yvonne Bell	561	19.0	−0.6
Conservative	Heather Chambers	551	18.6	+5.1
Registered electors		7,130		
Turnout			41.7	−1.0
Liberal Democrats hold		Swing		

=== Denton ===
Denton
Party	Candidate	Votes	%	±%
Liberal Democrats	Graham Middleton	1,551	46.3	−18.2
Labour	Tracy Paul	1,079	32.2	−3.3
Conservative	Jon Aydon	415	12.4	N/A
BNP	Sheila Gregory	302	9.0	N/A
Registered electors		7,817		
Turnout			42.9	−0.8
Liberal Democrats hold		Swing		

=== East Gosforth ===
East Gosforth
Party	Candidate	Votes	%	±%
Liberal Democrats	Michael Cookson	1,574	50.9	−7.5
Conservative	Brian Moore	653	21.1	+7.9
Labour	Catherine McKinnell	559	18.1	−0.7
Green	David Coombes	309	10.0	+0.3
Registered electors		6,700		
Turnout			46.3	−1.2
Liberal Democrats hold		Swing		

=== Elswick ===
Elswick
Party	Candidate	Votes	%	±%
Labour	Dipu Ahad	1,284	55.9	+11.3
Liberal Democrats	Andrew McQuillin	379	16.5	−9.3
BNP	Kenneth Booth	309	13.5	−5.7
Conservative	Ron Toward	186	8.1	N/A
Respect	Dean Huggins	137	6.0	−4.5
Registered electors		7,185		
Turnout			32.0	−2.1
Labour hold		Swing		

=== Fawdon ===
Fawdon
Party	Candidate	Votes	%	±%
Liberal Democrats	Ronald Clark	1,923	65.6	+11.2
Labour	Jacky Foley	778	26.5	−3.6
Conservative	Timothy Troman	230	7.8	+3.7
Registered electors		7,165		
Turnout			41.1	−2.4
Liberal Democrats hold		Swing		

=== Fenham ===
Fenham
Party	Candidate	Votes	%	±%
Labour	Terry Cooney	1,377	41.7	−0.9
Liberal Democrats	John McClurey	1,373	41.5	−4.3
Conservative	Duncan James	305	9.2	−2.4
BNP	Tom Sisterson	250	7.6	N/A
Registered electors		7,733		
Turnout			42.9	+0.4
Labour hold		Swing		

=== Kenton ===
Kenton
Party	Candidate	Votes	%	±%
Labour	Stephen Lambert	1,483	55.8	+3.4
Liberal Democrats	David Turner	745	28.0	−5.8
Conservative	Charlotte Ives	431	16.2	+2.4
Registered electors		7,212		
Turnout			37.1	−2.5
Labour hold		Swing		

=== Lemington ===
Lemington (2 seats due to by-election) Replacing Robert Ash (Liberal Democrats)
Party	Candidate	Votes	%	±%
Liberal Democrats	Lawrence Hunter	1,617	54.6	+7.9
Liberal Democrats	Joanne Park	1,475	/	/
Labour	Helen McStravick	887	30.0	−2.2
Labour	Antoine Tinnion	853	/	/
BNP	Viv Browne	303	10.2	−5.0
Conservative	Alan Birkmyre	154	5.2	−0.6
Conservative	Mary Toward	124	/	/
Registered electors		7,410		
Turnout			40.6	+6.5
Liberal Democrats hold		Swing		
Liberal Democrats hold		Swing		

=== Newburn ===
Newburn
Party	Candidate	Votes	%	±%
Liberal Democrats	Michael Lynch	1,403	42.9	+12.7
Labour	John O'Shea	1,371	42.0	−4.1
BNP	Alan Patterson	337	10.3	−4.1
Conservative	Christopher Martin	157	4.8	−4.5
Registered electors		7,055		
Turnout			46.4	+5.0
Liberal Democrats gain from Labour		Swing		

=== North Heaton ===
North Heaton
Party	Candidate	Votes	%	±%
Liberal Democrats	Karen Robinson	1,734	55.7	+5.9
Labour	Christopher Wilkie	698	22.4	−2.5
Conservative	Stephen Brownlee	386	12.4	−2.6
Green	Andrew Gray	293	9.4	−1.0
Registered electors		7,463		
Turnout			41.9	−1.4
Liberal Democrats hold		Swing		

=== North Jesmond ===
North Jesmond
Party	Candidate	Votes	%	±%
Liberal Democrats	Ronald Armstrong	1,065	56.2	+1.8
Labour	Stephen Maratos	316	16.7	−4.0
Conservative	Stephen Warrick	311	16.4	+1.4
Green	John Pearson	202	10.7	+0.9
Registered electors		6,058		
Turnout			31.3	−4.0
Liberal Democrats hold		Swing		

=== Ouseburn ===
Ouseburn
Party	Candidate	Votes	%	±%
Liberal Democrats	Gareth Cooper	861	51.7	+2.3
Labour	Farah McArdle	472	28.3	−1.2
Green	Alastair Bonnett	221	13.3	−0.4
Conservative	Ann Wake	111	6.7	−0.8
Registered electors		6,044		
Turnout			27.6	−0.4
Liberal Democrats hold		Swing		

=== Parklands ===
Parklands
Party	Candidate	Votes	%	±%
Liberal Democrats	David Brook	2,102	60.8	−3.4
Conservative	Neville Armstrong	703	20.3	−0.8
Labour	Susan Pearson	429	12.4	+1.3
Independent	Andrea Bell	222	6.4	N/A
Registered electors		7,120		
Turnout			48.6	−0.8
Liberal Democrats hold		Swing		

=== South Heaton ===
South Heaton (2 seats due to by-election) Replacing Helen Laing (Liberal Democrats)
Party	Candidate	Votes	%	±%
Labour	Henri Murison	904	43.4	−5.0
Labour	Christopher Bartlett	879	/	/
Liberal Democrats	Ed Davies	824	39.6	+1.9
Liberal Democrats	Henry Gallager	796	/	/
Green	Michael Rabley	240	11.5	+2.6
Green	David Shepherdson	194	/	/
Conservative	Dominic Llewellyn	114	5.5	+0.5
Conservative	Martin Robson	98	/	/
Registered electors		5,568		
Turnout			37.9	−3.4
Labour gain from Liberal Democrats		Swing		
Labour gain from Liberal Democrats		Swing		

=== South Jesmond ===
South Jesmond
Party	Candidate	Votes	%	±%
Liberal Democrats	Robert Walker	908	51.9	+1.8
Conservative	Barry Flux	351	20.0	+3.1
Labour	Elizabeth Mitsides	309	17.6	−3.8
Green	Malcolm Shiel	183	10.5	−1.1
Registered electors		5,639		
Turnout			31.2	−1.9
Liberal Democrats hold		Swing		

=== Walker ===
Walker
Party	Candidate	Votes	%	±%
Labour	Margaret Wood	1,625	65.5	−3.5
Liberal Democrats	Michael Burn	455	18.3	+0.6
BNP	John Mitchell	239	9.6	−2.3
Conservative	Deborah Storey	137	5.5	N/A
Communist	Martin Levy	26	1.0	−0.4
Registered electors		7,642		
Turnout			32.6	−2.4
Labour hold		Swing		

=== Walkergate ===
Walkergate
Party	Candidate	Votes	%	±%
Liberal Democrats	Pauline Allen	1,752	60.2	+2.0
Labour	Maureen Lowson	1,005	34.5	−2.2
Conservative	Marian McWilliams	153	5.3	+0.2
Registered electors		7,032		
Turnout			41.6	−2.3
Liberal Democrats hold		Swing		

=== West Gosforth ===
West Gosforth
Party	Candidate	Votes	%	±%
Liberal Democrats	Jackie Slesenger	2,111	59.3	+7.0
Conservative	Benjamin Fletcher	797	22.4	−8.0
Labour	Bill Dodds	461	13.0	+1.5
Green	Dawn Shiel	190	5.3	−0.5
Registered electors		7,272		
Turnout			49.0	−1.9
Liberal Democrats hold		Swing		

=== Westerhope ===
Westerhope
Party	Candidate	Votes	%	±%
Liberal Democrats	Pat Hillicks	2,029	54.7	−2.3
Labour	Brian Hunter	917	24.7	−5.4
Conservative	Jason Smith	523	14.1	+1.2
BNP	Shaun Russell	237	6.4	N/A
Registered electors		7,556		
Turnout			49.2	−0.7
Liberal Democrats hold		Swing		

=== Westgate ===
Westgate
Party	Candidate	Votes	%	±%
Labour	Joanne Kingsland	776	55.6	+10.6
Liberal Democrats	James Kenyon	354	25.4	−8.5
Conservative	Alexander Le Vey	152	10.9	N/A
BNP	Daniel Thorlby	114	8.2	−2.8
Registered electors		5,516		
Turnout			25.5	−3.7
Labour hold		Swing		

=== Wingrove ===
The election in this ward was postponed to 14 June 2007 due to the death of a candidate.

Wingrove (2 seats due to by-election) Replacing Ayoub Dad (Liberal Democrats)
Party	Candidate	Votes	%	±%
Labour	Nigel Todd	1,051	43.1	+3.2
Liberal Democrats	Ayaz Siddique	948	38.9	+0.4
Labour	Alyson Hampshire	908	/	/
Liberal Democrats	Deborah Wilkinson	869	/	/
Green	Jenny Pearson	186	7.6	+0.9
Green	John Pearson	183	/	/
Conservative	Neil Archibald	173	7.1	−1.7
Conservative	Alexander Le Vey	140	/	/
BNP	Viv Browne	81	3.3	−2.8
BNP	Graham Hodgson	80	/	/
Registered electors		7,678		
Turnout			31.2	−5.2
Labour hold		Swing		
Liberal Democrats hold		Swing		

=== Woolsington ===
Woolsington (2 seats due to by-election) Replacing John Appleby (Liberal Democrats)
Party	Candidate	Votes	%	±%
Labour	Kevin Graham	1,558	47.0	−0.4
Labour	Sharon Pattison	1,548	/	/
Liberal Democrats	William Thorkildsen	1,333	40.2	−5.8
Liberal Democrats	David Down	1,263	/	/
Conservative	Colin Forster	221	6.7	+0.1
BNP	Chris Carnegie	206	6.2	N/A
Conservative	Irene Forster	188	/	/
Registered electors		7,556		
Turnout			44.0	+0.8
Labour gain from Liberal Democrats		Swing		
Labour gain from Liberal Democrats		Swing		
