= 2011 Newcastle City Council election =

2011 UK local government election

- 5 May 2011
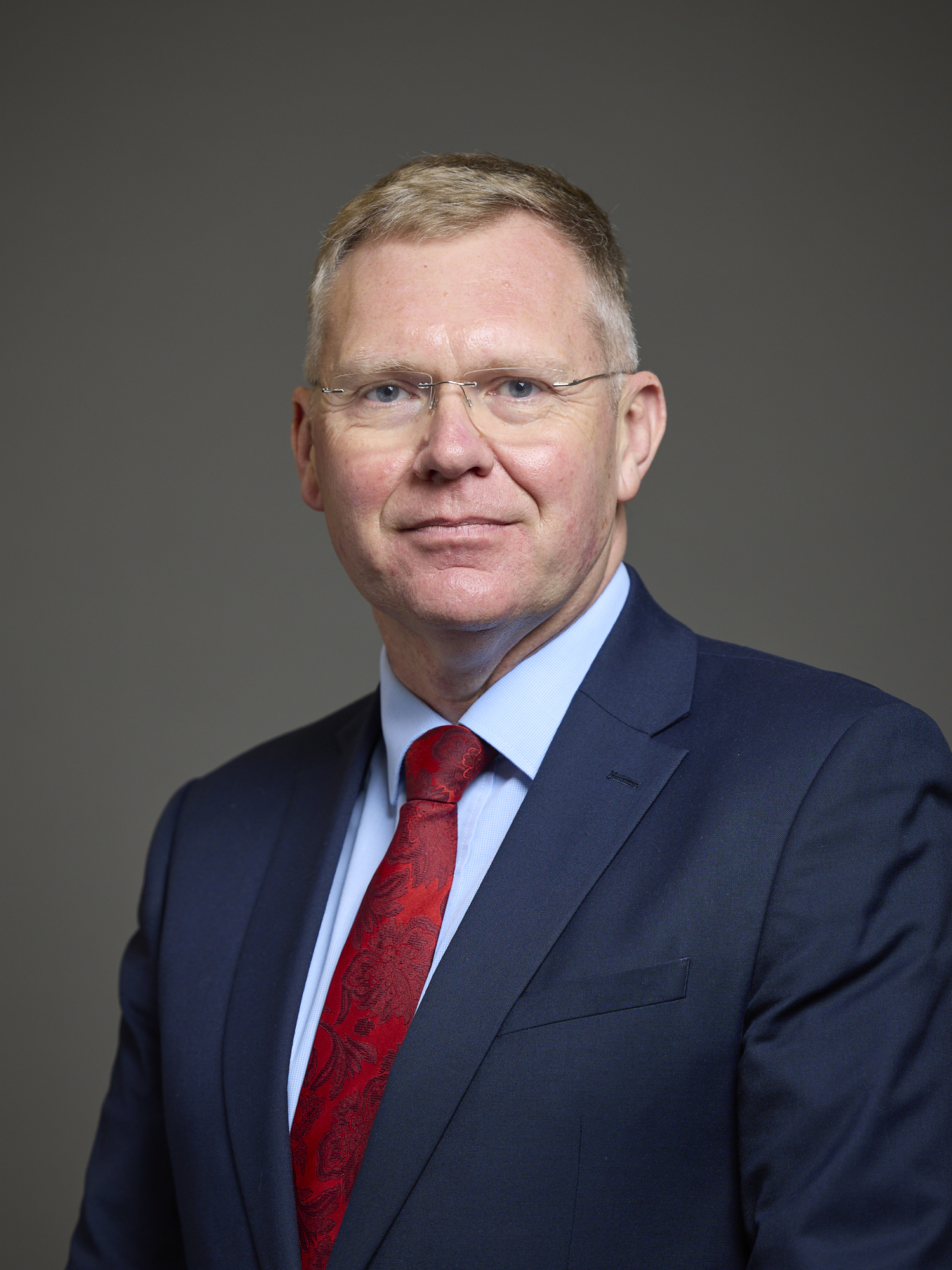
| | First party | Second party | Third party |
|---|---|---|---|
| Leader | Nick Forbes | David Falkner |
| Party | Labour | Liberal Democrats | Independent |
| Leader's seat | Westgate | Fawdon |
| Last election | 32 | 42 | 2 |
| Seats won | | | 2 |
| Popular vote | 39,832 | 23,443 |
| Percentage | 51% | 31.1% |
| Swing | | ▼1% |
| Councillors | 44 | 32 | 2 |
| Councillors +/– | ▲12 | ▼10 | ▲0 |
- Results of the 2011 Newcastle City Council election

The 2011 Newcastle City Council election took place on 5 May 2011 to elect one third of the members of Newcastle City Council in England. The elections took place on the same day as other local elections.

The result saw the Labour Party gain 12 seats from the Liberal Democrats, taking control of the council for the first time in seven years.

Two wards held elections at a later date. The election in Byker was postponed prior to polling day following the death of Conservative candidate Alice Gingell, and the election in Westerhope was abandoned following the death of Liberal Democrat candidate Neil Hamilton on polling day. Both wards held elections on 16 June 2011.

== Results summary ==
2011 Newcastle City Council election
| Party | This election | | | | Full council | | | This election | | |
| Party | Candidates | Seats | Net | Seats % | Other | Total | Total % | Votes | Votes % | +/− |
|---|---|---|---|---|---|---|---|---|---|---|
| Labour | {{{candidates}}} | 21 | ▲9 | 77.8 | 22 | 43 | 55.1 | 40,540 | 50.7 | |
| Liberal Democrats | {{{candidates}}} | 6 | ▼12 | 22.2 | 26 | 32 | 41.0 | 23,914 | 29.9 | |
| Conservative | {{{candidates}}} | 0 | Steady | 0.0 | 0 | 0 | 0.0 | 8,877 | 11.1 | |
| BNP | {{{candidates}}} | 0 | Steady | 0.0 | 0 | 0 | 0.0 | 2,050 | 2.6 | |
| Green | {{{candidates}}} | 0 | Steady | 0.0 | 0 | 0 | 0.0 | 1,681 | 2.1 | |
| Newcastle upon Tyne Community First Party | {{{candidates}}} | 0 | New | 0.0 | 0 | 0 | 0.0 | 1,619 | 2.0 | New |
| Independent | {{{candidates}}} | 0 | Steady | 0.0 | 1 | 1 | 1.3 | 1,266 | 1.6 | |
| Communist | {{{candidates}}} | 0 | Steady | 0.0 | 0 | 0 | 0.0 | 22 | 0.0 | |

== Results by ward (A-Z) ==
An asterisk (*) indicates an incumbent candidate.

Two asterisks (**) indicates an incumbent candidate standing for re-election in a different ward.

=== Benwell & Scotswood ===
Benwell & Scotswood
| Party | Candidate | Votes | % | ±% |
|---|---|---|---|---|
| Labour | Hazel Stephenson* | 2,202 | 68.5 | +13.7 |
| BNP | Doug Graham | 356 | 11.1 | −1.1 |
| Conservative | Neville Armstrong | 332 | 10.3 | −2.4 |
| Liberal Democrats | James Kenyon | 323 | 10.1 | −10.2 |
| Majority | | 1846 | 57.4 | +22.9 |
| Turnout | | 3213 | 38.4 | −12.5 |
| Labour hold | | Swing | | |

=== Blakelaw ===
Blakelaw
| Party | Candidate | Votes | % | ±% |
|---|---|---|---|---|
| Labour | Sue Pearson | 1,940 | 59.3 | +17.0 |
| Liberal Democrats | Philip Lower* | 1088 | 33.2 | −3.8 |
| Conservative | James Langley | 246 | 7.5 | −3.1 |
| Majority | | 852 | 26.1 | +20.8 |
| Turnout | | 3274 | 41.2 | −12.7 |
| Labour gain from Liberal Democrats | | Swing | | |

=== Byker ===
Byker
| Party | Candidate | Votes | % | ±% |
|---|---|---|---|---|
| Labour | Veronica Dunn* | 1,206 | 72.6 | +14.9 |
| BNP | Ken Booth | 144 | 8.7 | −0.1 |
| Liberal Democrats | Tracy Connell | 102 | 6.1 | −18.2 |
| Independent | Alan Mattinson | 78 | 4.7 | N/A |
| Conservative | James Bartle | 76 | 4.6 | −4.6 |
| Newcastle upon Tyne Community First Party | Angela McKenna | 55 | 3.3 | N/A |
| Majority | | 1062 | 63.9 | +30.5 |
| Turnout | | 1661 | 23.2 | −26.9 |
| Labour hold | | Swing | | |

The election in Byker ward was postponed until 16th June, due to the death of Conservative candidate Alice Gingell. Incumbent Councillor Veronica Dunn would ultimately retain the seat for Labour.

=== Castle ===
Castle
| Party | Candidate | Votes | % | ±% |
|---|---|---|---|---|
| Liberal Democrats | Ian Laverick* | 1,548 | 45.7 | −2.8 |
| Labour | Craig Johnson | 1367 | 40.3 | +11.9 |
| Conservative | Kenneth Wake | 476 | 14.0 | −0.2 |
| Majority | | 181 | 5.4 | −14.8 |
| Turnout | | 3391 | 45.4 | −22.1 |
| Liberal Democrats hold | | Swing | | |

=== Dene ===
Dene
| Party | Candidate | Votes | % | ±% |
|---|---|---|---|---|
| Liberal Democrats | Bob Renton* | 1,713 | 48.5 | −4.1 |
| Labour | Ian Rossiter | 1307 | 37.0 | +10.6 |
| Conservative | Heather Chambers | 511 | 14.5 | −0.7 |
| Majority | | 406 | 11.5 | −14.7 |
| Turnout | | 3531 | 47.0 | −21.2 |
| Liberal Democrats hold | | Swing | | |

=== Denton ===
Denton
| Party | Candidate | Votes | % | ±% |
|---|---|---|---|---|
| Labour | Simon Bird | 2,005 | 55.0 | +20.3 |
| Liberal Democrats | PJ Morrissey | 1034 | 28.4 | −9.1 |
| Newcastle upon Tyne Community First Party | Alan McKenna | 387 | 10.6 | N/A |
| Conservative | Alan Mirkmyre | 221 | 6.1 | −8.4 |
| Majority | | 971 | 26.6 | N/A |
| Turnout | | 3647 | 51.3 | −8.3 |
| Labour gain from Liberal Democrats | | Swing | | |

=== East Gosforth ===
East Gosforth
| Party | Candidate | Votes | % | ±% |
|---|---|---|---|---|
| Liberal Democrats | Henry Gallagher | 1,542 | 41.0 | −8.6 |
| Labour | Ed Derrick | 1322 | 35.1 | +6.0 |
| Conservative | Martin Sharman | 496 | 13.2 | −3.1 |
| Green | Frances Hinton | 403 | 10.7 | +5.7 |
| Majority | | 220 | 5.9 | −14.6 |
| Turnout | | 3763 | 50.9 | −20.0 |
| Liberal Democrats hold | | Swing | | |

=== Elswick ===
Elswick
| Party | Candidate | Votes | % | ±% |
|---|---|---|---|---|
| Labour | Dipu Ahad* | 1,742 | 66.0 | +6.6 |
| Labour | Ann Schofield | 1,604 | | |
| BNP | Denny Gallagher | 301 | 11.4 | −0.2 |
| Conservative | Imran Adil | 289 | 10.9 | +3.1 |
| BNP | Neil Mooney | 204 | | |
| Liberal Democrats | Hannah Claytor | 166 | 6.3 | −11.0 |
| Conservative | James O'Sullivan | 159 | | |
| Newcastle upon Tyne Community First Party | James Alder | 143 | 5.4 | N/A |
| Liberal Democrats | Matthew Folker | 123 | | |
| Turnout | | 2366 | 31.7 | −16.3 |
| Labour hold | | Swing | | |
| Labour hold | | Swing | | |

Two of Elswick's three seats were up for election, due to the death of Labour councillor Doreen James. Labour Councillor Dipu Ahad held his seat in the regular election, with Ann Schofield retaining the seat vacated by James for that same party.

=== Fawdon ===
Fawdon
| Party | Candidate | Votes | % | ±% |
|---|---|---|---|---|
| Labour | Antione Tinnion | 1,439 | 44.5 | +8.6 |
| Liberal Democrats | Ron Clark* | 1302 | 40.3 | −8.9 |
| BNP | Anita Cooper | 261 | 8.1 | +1.7 |
| Conservative | Tim Gilks | 229 | 7.1 | −1.5 |
| Majority | | 137 | 4.2 | −9.1 |
| Turnout | | 3231 | 45.3 | −13.9 |
| Labour gain from Liberal Democrats | | Swing | | |

=== Fenham ===
Fenham
| Party | Candidate | Votes | % | ±% |
|---|---|---|---|---|
| Labour | Matthew Myers | 1,773 | 50.2 | +9.9 |
| Liberal Democrats | Mitzi Emery | 890 | 25.2 | −8.2 |
| Conservative | Urfan Hussain | 385 | 10.9 | +0.5 |
| BNP | Ken Booth | 357 | 10.1 | −3.6 |
| Newcastle upon Tyne Community First Party | John Gordon | 129 | 3.7 | N/A |
| Majority | | 883 | 25.0 | +18.1 |
| Turnout | | 3534 | 44.3 | −14.3 |
| Labour hold | | Swing | | |

=== Kenton ===
Kenton
| Party | Candidate | Votes | % | ±% |
|---|---|---|---|---|
| Labour | Stephen Lambert* | 2,084 | 70.7 | +18.1 |
| Liberal Democrats | Peter Thompson | 449 | 15.2 | −9.0 |
| Conservative | Greg Peer | 416 | 14.1 | −1.8 |
| Majority | | 1635 | 55.5 | +27.1 |
| Turnout | | 2949 | 37.1 | −17.7 |
| Labour hold | | Swing | | |

=== Lemington ===
Lemington
| Party | Candidate | Votes | % | ±% |
|---|---|---|---|---|
| Labour | Barry Phillipson | 1,859 | 55.1 | +12.9 |
| Liberal Democrats | Lawrence Hunter* | 1026 | 30.4 | −8.0 |
| BNP | Paul Kennet | 178 | 5.3 | −3.4 |
| Conservative | Hugo Wiseman | 157 | 4.7 | −6.0 |
| Newcastle upon Tyne Community First Party | Wendy Thackray | 153 | 4.5 | N/A |
| Majority | | 833 | 24.7 | +20.9 |
| Turnout | | 3373 | 45.1 | −14.0 |
| Labour gain from Liberal Democrats | | Swing | | |

=== Newburn ===
Newburn
| Party | Candidate | Votes | % | ±% |
|---|---|---|---|---|
| Labour | Hilary Franks | 1,823 | 53.1 | +9.1 |
| Liberal Democrats | Mike Lynch* | 1078 | 31.4 | −5.9 |
| Conservative | Sarah Balston | 260 | 7.6 | −3.9 |
| BNP | Bill Curry | 148 | 4.3 | −3.0 |
| Newcastle upon Tyne Community First Party | Olga Shorton | 121 | 3.5 | N/A |
| Majority | | 745 | 22.7 | +16.0 |
| Turnout | | 3430 | 47.7 | −15.5 |
| Labour gain from Liberal Democrats | | Swing | | |

=== North Heaton ===
North Heaton
| Party | Candidate | Votes | % | ±% |
|---|---|---|---|---|
| Labour | Michael Johnson | 1,728 | 46.8 | +11.6 |
| Liberal Democrats | Karen Robinson* | 1554 | 42.1 | −3.0 |
| Conservative | James Bartle | 409 | 11.1 | −2.0 |
| Majority | | 174 | 4.7 | −5.2 |
| Turnout | | 3691 | 48.2 | −19.7 |
| Labour gain from Liberal Democrats | | Swing | | |

=== North Jesmond ===
North Jesmond
| Party | Candidate | Votes | % | ±% |
|---|---|---|---|---|
| Liberal Democrats | Peter Andras | 870 | 37.3 | −9.4 |
| Labour | Rebecca Earnshaw | 770 | 33.0 | +9.2 |
| Conservative | William Holloway | 419 | 18.0 | −4.8 |
| Green | Tim Dowson | 273 | 11.7 | +4.9 |
| Majority | | 100 | 4.3 | −18.6 |
| Turnout | | 2332 | 32.5 | −25.4 |
| Liberal Democrats hold | | Swing | | |

=== Ouseburn ===
Ouseburn
| Party | Candidate | Votes | % | ±% |
|---|---|---|---|---|
| Labour | Ian Preston | 1,110 | 49.9 | +17.6 |
| Liberal Democrats | Gareth Cooper* | 932 | 41.9 | −4.1 |
| Conservative | Emma Carr | 182 | 8.2 | −3.9 |
| Majority | | 178 | 8.0 | −5.7 |
| Turnout | | 2224 | 29.8 | −20.1 |
| Labour gain from Liberal Democrats | | Swing | | |

=== Parklands ===
Parklands
| Party | Candidate | Votes | % | ±% |
|---|---|---|---|---|
| Liberal Democrats | David Down | 2,098 | 54.0 | −1.4 |
| Labour | Sheila Spencer | 964 | 24.8 | +4.8 |
| Conservative | Kami Kundi | 521 | 13.4 | −6.6 |
| Independent | Andrea Bell | 305 | 7.8 | +5.2 |
| Majority | | 1134 | 29.2 | −6.2 |
| Turnout | | 3888 | 51.3 | −22.9 |
| Liberal Democrats hold | | Swing | | |
