= Newcastle Upon Tyne Youth Council =

Local government advisory body

Newcastle Youth Council is a local government advisory body in Newcastle upon Tyne. Its function is to represent the views of young people between the ages of 11 and 18 in the city and to improve the quality of life for younger children.

== History ==
Following a resolution passed by Newcastle City Council in 2009, the first elections to the Youth Council were organised in the summer of 2010 by the West End Youth Enquiry Service, part of the charity Children North East. That service had won a contract with the City Council to establish a democratically elected organisation which would "challenge, influence and work with" city decision makers "to improve the lives of young people and make the City a more young person friendly to live". The youth council would have the freedom to set its own priorities and agenda, as well as control its own budget. It is understood to have been the first time a local authority in the United Kingdom had outsourced the establishment of a youth council to an outside agency.

The first Newcastle Youth Council comprised 26 seats elected by voters aged 13–18 in four constituencies: Newcastle East (six seats, postcodes NE6, NE7), Newcastle West (eight seats, postcodes NE4, NE5, NE15), Newcastle North (six seats, postcodes NE3, NE13), Newcastle Central (six seats, postcodes NE1, NE2 and Newcastle College). Four elected Newcastle UK Youth Parliament representatives were to sit on the council in an ex officio capacity, pending elections for these places in January 2011. Voting took place by ballot box and online. Results were declared on 19 June at the Sir Bobby Robson suite in St James' Park, in a ceremony officiated by the Sheriff of Newcastle. 8,695 votes were cast. Further elections were held in 2012 and 2014.

In September 2013, the Youth Council reported to the City Council cabinet reflecting the views of young people and service providers in the city. In October 2014, the function of hosting the Youth Council was transferred to Newcastle City Council. Youth Councillors now have dedicated office space at the Civic Centre. A Council budget proposal for 2016/17 included reduction in support for the Youth Council.
