= 2004 Newcastle City Council election =

2004 UK local government election

- 10 June 2004

All 78 seats to Newcastle City Council 40 seats needed for a majority
- Turnout: 46.6%
	Majority party	Minority party
Party	Liberal Democrats	Labour
Seats before	24	54
Seats won	48	30
Seat change	▲24	▼24
Popular vote	98,284	79,760
Percentage	44.2%	35.9%

Newcastle upon Tyne UK local election 2004 map

The 2004 Newcastle City Council election was held to elect members of the Newcastle City Council on 10 June 2004, coinciding with elections to the European Parliament and other local elections. The entire complement of 78 seats in the city were contested due to major boundary changes that year. The Liberal Democrats ended thirty years of Labour control and the table below shows the composition of the council following the election.

Party	Seats			Council Composition 10 June 2004
Party	2002	2003	2004	Council Composition 10 June 2004
Liberal Democrats	19	24	48	
Labour	59	54	30	

== Results summary ==
2004 Newcastle City Council election
Party	Candidates	Seats	Gains	Losses	Net gain/loss	Seats %	Votes %	Votes	+/−
Liberal Democrats	78	48	-	-	▲24	61.5	44.2	98,284	
Labour	78	30	-	-	▼24	38.5	35.9	79,760	
Conservative	78	0	-	-	Steady	0.0	15.3	34,068	
Independent	7	0	-	-	Steady	0.0	1.5	3,244	
Green	8	0	-	-	Steady	0.0	1.2	2,620	
BNP	7	0	-	-	Steady	0.0	1.0	2,256	
National Front	3	0	-	-	Steady	0.0	0.5	1,044	
Socialist	2	0	-	-	Steady	0.0	0.3	573	
English Democrat	1	0	-	-	Steady	0.0	0.1	240	
Communist	1	0	-	-	Steady	0.0	0.0	49	

== Ward results ==
=== Benwell & Scotswood ===
Benwell & Scotswood
Party	Candidate	Votes	%	±%
Labour	R. Higgins	1,811	52.3	
Labour	H. Stephenson	1,760	/	
Labour	J. Beecham	1,730	/	
Liberal Democrats	V. Rushton	631	18.2	
Liberal Democrats	P. Wakefield	625	/	
BNP	J. Keys	536	15.5	
Liberal Democrats	A. Latif	531	/	
Conservative	M. Fleeting	486	14.0	
Conservative	S. Kyte	441	/	
Conservative	P. Wallis	405	/	
Registered electors		8,574		
Turnout			44.1	
Labour win (new boundaries)				
Labour win (new boundaries)				
Labour win (new boundaries)				

=== Blakelaw ===
Blakelaw
Party	Candidate	Votes	%	±%
Liberal Democrats	G. Keating	1,504	40.0	
Liberal Democrats	P. Lower	1,402	/	
Liberal Democrats	C. Schardt	1,358	/	
Labour	J. Marshall	1,278	34.0	
Labour	J. Easton	1,074	/	
Labour	R. Mintram	1,040	/	
BNP	B. Terry	359	9.6	
Independent	J. Wilkins	318	8.5	
Conservative	M. Carnaby	298	7.9	
Conservative	S. Jaques	297	/	
Conservative	J. Millar	290	/	
Registered electors		7,700		
Turnout			47.6	
Liberal Democrats win (new boundaries)				
Liberal Democrats win (new boundaries)				
Liberal Democrats win (new boundaries)				

=== Byker ===
Byker
Party	Candidate	Votes	%	±%
Labour	G. Allison	1,376	46.3	
Labour	M. Pike	1,065	/	
Labour	N. Kemp	1,055	/	
Liberal Democrats	T. Thompson	692	23.3	
Liberal Democrats	T. Simpson	600	/	
Liberal Democrats	V. Besag	506	/	
Socialist	W. Hopwood	378	12.7	
BNP	V. Browne	296	9.9	
Conservative	J. McNally	233	7.8	
Conservative	P. Farmahan	229	/	
Conservative	R. Sanderson	202	/	
Registered electors		7,264		
Turnout			38.4	
Labour win (new boundaries)				
Labour win (new boundaries)				
Labour win (new boundaries)				

=== Castle ===
Castle
Party	Candidate	Votes	%	±%
Liberal Democrats	I. Graham	1,973	60.2	
Liberal Democrats	I. Laverick	1,833	/	
Liberal Democrats	A. Lower	1,691	/	
Labour	J. Mackinlay	817	24.9	
Labour	D. Cook	672	/	
Labour	A. Nehmet	642	/	
Conservative	M. Toward	489	14.9	
Conservative	J. North	432	/	
Conservative	L. Molyneux	412	/	
Registered electors		7,334		
Turnout			47.1	
Liberal Democrats win (new boundaries)				
Liberal Democrats win (new boundaries)				
Liberal Democrats win (new boundaries)				

=== Dene ===
Dene
Party	Candidate	Votes	%	±%
Liberal Democrats	W. Taylor	2,298	64.5	
Liberal Democrats	R. Renton	2,249	/	
Liberal Democrats	S. Bailey	2,092	/	
Labour	M. Bell	651	18.3	
Conservative	H. Chambers	613	17.2	
Labour	C. Wilkie	591	/	
Labour	R. Stobbs	586	/	
Conservative	A. Gingell	512	/	
Conservative	M. Tulip	448	/	
Registered electors		7,124		
Turnout			51.9	
Liberal Democrats win (new boundaries)				
Liberal Democrats win (new boundaries)				
Liberal Democrats win (new boundaries)				

=== Denton ===
Denton
Party	Candidate	Votes	%	±%
Liberal Democrats	I. Proud	1,870	49.2	
Liberal Democrats	G. Middleton	1,432	/	
Liberal Democrats	R. Morl	1,345	/	
Labour	M. Carr	1,277	33.6	
Labour	M. Lynch	1,231	/	
Labour	D. Snowdon	1,112	/	
Conservative	E. Graham	403	10.6	
Conservative	M. Millar	334	/	
Conservative	G. Durno	331	/	
National Front	R. Wood	248	6.5	
Registered electors		7,771		
Turnout			50.1	
Liberal Democrats win (new boundaries)				
Liberal Democrats win (new boundaries)				
Liberal Democrats win (new boundaries)				

=== East Gosforth ===
East Gosforth
Party	Candidate	Votes	%	±%
Liberal Democrats	P. Arnold	2,203	55.0	
Liberal Democrats	M. Cookson	2,095	/	
Liberal Democrats	D. Slesenger	1,845	/	
Labour	H. Jackson	814	20.3	
Labour	R. Baker	799	/	
Labour	D. Gray	772	/	
Conservative	H. Hodges	519	13.0	
Independent	M. Summersby	470	11.7	
Conservative	A. Wake	118	/	
Conservative	K. Wake	118	/	
Registered electors		6,746		
Turnout			56.6	
Liberal Democrats win (new boundaries)				
Liberal Democrats win (new boundaries)				
Liberal Democrats win (new boundaries)				

=== Elswick ===
Elswick
Party	Candidate	Votes	%	±%
Labour	D. James	1,205	52.4	
Labour	S. Khan	1,122	/	
Labour	D. Malcolm	1,048	/	
Liberal Democrats	A. Murphy	659	28.7	
Liberal Democrats	A. Gravell	648	/	
Liberal Democrats	C. Pagan	577	/	
Conservative	J. Blay	435	18.9	
Conservative	M. Kyte	412	/	
Conservative	R. Toward	358	/	
Registered electors		6,969		
Turnout			39.8	
Labour win (new boundaries)				
Labour win (new boundaries)				
Labour win (new boundaries)				

=== Fawdon ===
Fawdon
Party	Candidate	Votes	%	±%
Liberal Democrats	B. Hindmarsh	1,838	52.3	
Liberal Democrats	R. Clark	1,767	/	
Liberal Democrats	D. Faulkner	1,644	/	
Labour	J. Laing	1,210	34.4	
Labour	K. Taylor	1,180	/	
Labour	A. Flynn	1,139	/	
English Democrat	M. Thompson	240	6.8	
Conservative	V. Bruce	229	6.5	
Conservative	C. Laws	213	/	
Conservative	J. McGill	201	/	
Registered electors		7,214		
Turnout			51.5	
Liberal Democrats win (new boundaries)				
Liberal Democrats win (new boundaries)				
Liberal Democrats win (new boundaries)				

=== Fenham ===
Fenham
Party	Candidate	Votes	%	±%
Labour	G. Johnson	1,283	37.1	
Labour	T. Cooney	1,202	/	
Labour	I. Cooney	1,188	/	
Liberal Democrats	A. McQuillin	788	22.8	
Conservative	F. Kirkby	700	20.3	
Independent	R. Ewart	684	19.8	
Conservative	P. Lumley	668	/	
Independent	G. Birkett	635	/	
Liberal Democrats	J. Kenyon	594	/	
Conservative	D. Farmahan	574	/	
Liberal Democrats	G. Soult	529	/	
Registered electors		7,685		
Turnout			45.4	
Labour win (new boundaries)				
Labour win (new boundaries)				
Labour win (new boundaries)				

=== Kenton ===
Kenton
Party	Candidate	Votes	%	±%
Labour	M. Carter	1,483	45.6	
Labour	S. Lambert	1,332	/	
Labour	G. Bell	1,300	/	
Liberal Democrats	A. Young	826	25.4	
Liberal Democrats	S. Mansfield	691	/	
Liberal Democrats	R. Silkin	665	/	
Conservative	N. Armstrong	643	19.8	
Conservative	K. Gilfillan	624	/	
Conservative	J. Henry	617	/	
BNP	A. Wilson	299	9.2	
Registered electors		7,122		
Turnout			47.0	
Labour win (new boundaries)				
Labour win (new boundaries)				
Labour win (new boundaries)				

=== Lemington ===
Lemington
Party	Candidate	Votes	%	±%
Labour	B. Phillipson	1,595	52.6	
Labour	J. Gordon	1,526	/	
Labour	R. Robson	1,421	/	
Liberal Democrats	E. Dicken	661	21.8	
Liberal Democrats	B. Down	656	/	
Liberal Democrats	S. Ramsey	639	/	
Conservative	P. Dowdeswell	429	14.1	
Conservative	S. Axford	420	/	
Conservative	D. Walder	384	/	
National Front	P. Foster	350	11.5	
Registered electors		7,484		
Turnout			43.2	
Labour win (new boundaries)				
Labour win (new boundaries)				
Labour win (new boundaries)				

=== Newburn ===
Newburn
Party	Candidate	Votes	%	±%
Labour	E. Whittaker	1,456	46.1	
Labour	J. O'Shea	1,381	/	
Labour	L. Wright	1,356	/	
Liberal Democrats	D. Turner	820	25.9	
Liberal Democrats	J. Mansfield	792	/	
Liberal Democrats	L. Ormston	754	/	
National Front	K. Booth	446	14.1	
Conservative	J. Hillman	439	13.9	
Conservative	M. Johnson	435	/	
Conservative	N. Story	388	/	
Registered electors		6,888		
Turnout			48.7	
Labour win (new boundaries)				
Labour win (new boundaries)				
Labour win (new boundaries)				

=== North Heaton ===
North Heaton
Party	Candidate	Votes	%	±%
Liberal Democrats	D. Huddart	1,720	46.9	
Liberal Democrats	R. Jackman	1,590	/	
Liberal Democrats	G. Stone	1,496	/	
Labour	G. Green	859	23.4	
Labour	Y. Ritchie	820	/	
Labour	G. Addy	720	/	
Conservative	P. Blackwell	549	15.0	
Conservative	M. Legras	429	/	
Conservative	W. Walder	369	/	
Green	C. Hayday	327	8.9	
Green	A. Lipman	313	/	
Green	M. Rabley	263	/	
BNP	D. Brough	210	5.7	
Registered electors		7,377		
Turnout			50.4	
Liberal Democrats win (new boundaries)				
Liberal Democrats win (new boundaries)				
Liberal Democrats win (new boundaries)				

=== North Jesmond ===
North Jesmond
Party	Candidate	Votes	%	±%
Liberal Democrats	L. McKeever	1,521	55.3	
Liberal Democrats	R. Armstrong	1,260	/	
Liberal Democrats	A. Rounthwaite	1,176	/	
Labour	P. Hughes	602	21.9	
Labour	C. Grady	562	/	
Labour	P. Ronan	529	/	
Conservative	C. Middleton	433	15.8	
Conservative	J. Prince	370	/	
Conservative	N. Ward	368	/	
Independent	T. Manley	193	7.0	
Registered electors		6,232		
Turnout			40.9	
Liberal Democrats win (new boundaries)				
Liberal Democrats win (new boundaries)				
Liberal Democrats win (new boundaries)				

=== Ouseburn ===
Ouseburn
Party	Candidate	Votes	%	±%
Liberal Democrats	S. Psallidas	1,293	60.7	
Liberal Democrats	G. Cooper	1,207	/	
Liberal Democrats	G. Kane	1,163	/	
Labour	F. Clarke	668	31.4	
Labour	N. Foster	649	/	
Labour	P. Thomson	603	/	
Conservative	E. Burdon-Taylor	169	7.9	
Conservative	E. Bessman	161	/	
Conservative	A. Waters	144	/	
Registered electors		6,088		
Turnout			38.1	
Liberal Democrats win (new boundaries)				
Liberal Democrats win (new boundaries)				
Liberal Democrats win (new boundaries)				

=== Parklands ===
Parklands
Party	Candidate	Votes	%	±%
Liberal Democrats	J. Shipley	2,405	61.7	
Liberal Democrats	D. Brook	2,238	/	
Liberal Democrats	D. Packham	2,093	/	
Conservative	I. Birkmyre	705	18.1	
Conservative	E. McQueen	660	/	
Conservative	V. Molyneux	542	/	
Labour	S. Pearson	515	13.2	
Labour	J. Lamb	379	/	
Labour	T. Wilson	353	/	
Independent	W. Dix	274	7.0	
Registered electors		6,496		
Turnout			57.3	
Liberal Democrats win (new boundaries)				
Liberal Democrats win (new boundaries)				
Liberal Democrats win (new boundaries)				

=== South Heaton ===
South Heaton
Party	Candidate	Votes	%	±%
Liberal Democrats	H. Laing	1,015	36.8	
Liberal Democrats	K. Robinson	967	/	
Labour	G. Ormonde	938	34.0	
Liberal Democrats	S. Tighe	920	/	
Labour	W. Dodds	909	/	
Labour	C. McDonald	732	/	
Green	A. Gray	393	14.2	
Green	D. Shepherdson	295	/	
Conservative	S. Brownlee	219	7.9	
Socialist	C. Collins	195	7.1	
Conservative	R. Edge	177	/	
Conservative	D. Storey	175	/	
Registered electors		5,765		
Turnout			45.6	
Liberal Democrats win (new boundaries)				
Liberal Democrats win (new boundaries)				
Labour win (new boundaries)				

=== South Jesmond ===
South Jesmond
Party	Candidate	Votes	%	±%
Liberal Democrats	C. Boyle	1,362	59.2	
Liberal Democrats	R. Walker	1,272	/	
Liberal Democrats	T. Woodwark	1,218	/	
Labour	C. Bartlett	531	23.1	
Labour	R. Carr	495	/	
Labour	M. Murning	476	/	
Conservative	J. Catto	408	17.7	
Conservative	P. Catto	391	/	
Conservative	S. Warrick	383	/	
Registered electors		6,613		
Turnout			36.2	
Liberal Democrats win (new boundaries)				
Liberal Democrats win (new boundaries)				
Liberal Democrats win (new boundaries)				

=== Walker ===
Walker
Party	Candidate	Votes	%	±%
Labour	D. Wood	1,644	60.1	
Labour	G. Douglas	1,642	/	
Labour	J. Stokel-Walker	1,590	/	
Liberal Democrats	G. Anthony	537	19.6	
Liberal Democrats	W. Gravell	416	/	
Liberal Democrats	D. Cain	405	/	
BNP	L. McCourt	311	11.4	
Conservative	E. Sedgwick	196	7.2	
Conservative	I. Davison	193	/	
Conservative	D. Jones	178	/	
Communist	M. Levy	49	1.8	
Registered electors		7,662		
Turnout			39.1	
Labour win (new boundaries)				
Labour win (new boundaries)				
Labour win (new boundaries)				

=== Walkergate ===
Walkergate
Party	Candidate	Votes	%	±%
Liberal Democrats	P. Allen	1,973	56.8	
Liberal Democrats	P. Allen	1,885	/	
Liberal Democrats	D. Besag	1,630	/	
Labour	B. Rice	1,298	37.4	
Labour	M. Wood	1,204	/	
Labour	M. Lowson	1,160	/	
Conservative	M. McWilliams	203	5.8	
Conservative	D. Robinson	192	/	
Conservative	S. Robinson	171	/	
Registered electors		7,061		
Turnout			53.1	
Liberal Democrats win (new boundaries)				
Liberal Democrats win (new boundaries)				
Liberal Democrats win (new boundaries)				

=== West Gosforth ===
West Gosforth
Party	Candidate	Votes	%	±%
Liberal Democrats	N. Cott	1,809	41.1	
Liberal Democrats	J. Slesenger	1,804	/	
Liberal Democrats	W. Shepherd	1,736	/	
Conservative	J. Middleton	1,311	29.8	
Conservative	B. Moore	1,234	/	
Conservative	S. Gilfillan	1,229	/	
Independent	M. Summersby	670	15.2	
Labour	S. O'Brien	611	13.9	
Labour	J. Streather	608	/	
Labour	H. Elcock	578	/	
Registered electors		7,337		
Turnout			57.4	
Liberal Democrats win (new boundaries)				
Liberal Democrats win (new boundaries)				
Liberal Democrats win (new boundaries)				

=== Westerhope ===
Westerhope
Party	Candidate	Votes	%	±%
Liberal Democrats	M. Donnelly	1,831	41.5	
Liberal Democrats	P. Hillicks	1,666	/	
Liberal Democrats	N. Hamilton	1,522	/	
Labour	J. Angus	1,404	31.8	
Labour	B. Hunter	1,363	/	
Conservative	R. Deathers	1,180	26.7	
Conservative	T. Troman	1,137	/	
Conservative	A. Birkmyre	1,127	/	
Labour	E. Mackinlay	1,062	/	
Registered electors		7,599		
Turnout			60.2	
Liberal Democrats win (new boundaries)				
Liberal Democrats win (new boundaries)				
Liberal Democrats win (new boundaries)				

=== Westgate ===
Westgate
Party	Candidate	Votes	%	±%
Labour	N. Forbes	794	51.0	
Labour	J. Kingsland	755	/	
Labour	G. O'Brien	737	/	
Liberal Democrats	P. McHugh	523	33.6	
Liberal Democrats	L. Rozner	506	/	
Liberal Democrats	M. Ali	488	/	
Conservative	O. Hudson	239	15.4	
Conservative	P. Harrison	237	/	
Conservative	S. Lowes	219	/	
Registered electors		5,633		
Turnout			32.8	
Labour win (new boundaries)				
Labour win (new boundaries)				
Labour win (new boundaries)				

=== Wingrove ===
Wingrove
Party	Candidate	Votes	%	±%
Liberal Democrats	A. Dad	1,102	36.2	
Labour	N. Todd	1,029	33.8	
Labour	J. McCarty	1,010	/	
Labour	J. Farrell	896	/	
Liberal Democrats	D. Miah	869	/	
Liberal Democrats	A. Richardson	717	/	
Conservative	M. Blenkinsop	521	17.1	
Conservative	R. Bevan	475	/	
Conservative	J. Gough	421	/	
Green	P. Hilton	390	12.8	
Green	A. Ashworth	380	/	
Green	M. Kneafsey	259	/	
Registered electors		7,955		
Turnout			40.6	
Liberal Democrats win (new boundaries)				
Labour win (new boundaries)				
Labour win (new boundaries)				

=== Woolsington ===
Woolsington
Party	Candidate	Votes	%	±%
Liberal Democrats	J. Appleby	1,598	46.8	
Liberal Democrats	D. Down	1,555	/	
Liberal Democrats	W. Thorkildsen	1,473	/	
Labour	A. Bell	1,160	34.0	
Labour	K. Graham	1,155	/	
Labour	L. Kennedy	1,140	/	
Conservative	C. Forster	409	12.0	
Conservative	I. Forster	383	/	
Conservative	O. Kaer	355	/	
BNP	J. Mitchell	245	7.2	
Registered electors		7,523		
Turnout			48.6	
Liberal Democrats win (new boundaries)				
Liberal Democrats win (new boundaries)				
Liberal Democrats win (new boundaries)				
