= Colin Ferguson (politician) =

British politician

Councillor Colin Ferguson

Leader of Newcastle City Council
- Incumbent
- Assumed office 27 May 2026
- Preceded by: Karen Kilgour

Leader of the Opposition in Newcastle City Council
- In office 23 January 2023 – 27 May 2026
- Preceded by: Nick Cott
- Succeeded by: Nick Hartley

Councillor for Gosforth
- Incumbent
- Assumed office 8 May 2018

Leader of the Liberal Democrats on Newcastle City Council
- Incumbent
- Assumed office 23 January 2023
- Preceded by: Nick Cott

Personal details
- Born: December 1987 (age 38) Belfast, Northern Ireland
- Party: Liberal Democrats

Colin Peter Ferguson (born December 1987) is a British Liberal Democrat politician who has served as the Leader of Newcastle City Council since May 2026, having previously served as leader of the opposition from 2023 to 2026. He has been the leader of the Liberal Democrats on the council since 2023. He has served as a councillor for the Gosforth ward since 2018.

== Early life ==
Ferguson was born in Belfast.
