= Nick Forbes, Baron Forbes of Newcastle =

British Labour politician (born 1973)

The Right Honourable The Lord Forbes of Newcastle CBE
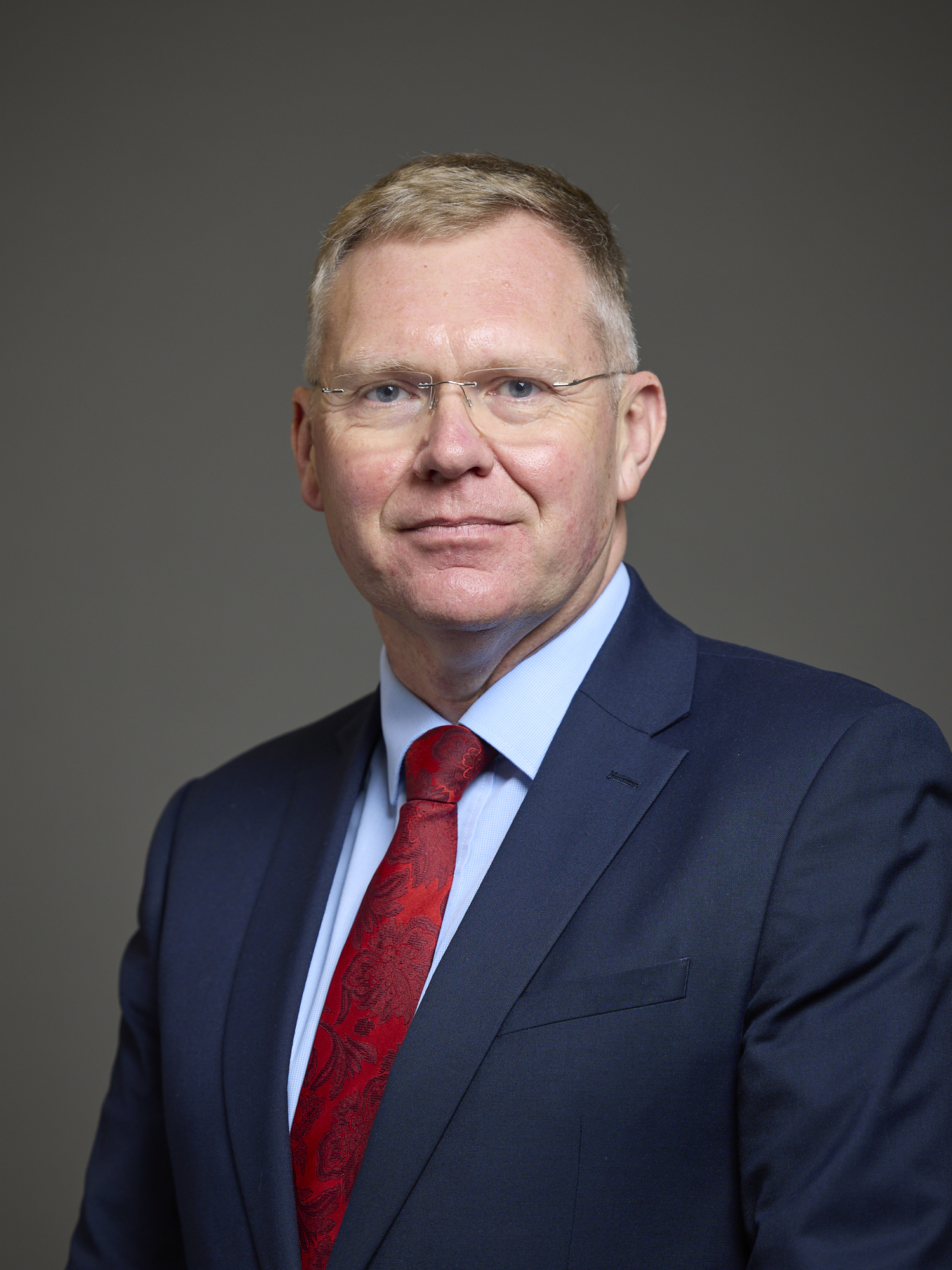
- Official portrait, 2026

Leader of the Labour Group of the Local Government Association
- In office 6 January 2016 – 10 June 2022; Attending Shadow Cabinet: 6 April 2020 – 10 June 2022
- Preceded by: Jim McMahon
- Succeeded by: Shaun Davies

Leader of Newcastle City Council
- In office 5 May 2011 – 25 May 2022
- Preceded by: David Faulkner
- Succeeded by: Nick Kemp

Member of Newcastle City Council
- In office 4 May 2000 – 6 May 2022
- Ward: Moorside (2000–2004); Westgate (2004–2018); Arthur's Hill (2018–2022)
- Preceded by: J. Fear
- Succeeded by: Abdul Samad

Member of the House of Lords
- Lord Temporal
- Life peerage 9 January 2026

Personal details
- Born: Nicholas Iain Forbes; 8 November 1973 (age 52) County Durham, England
- Party: Labour
- Education: Selwyn College, Cambridge (BA); Sheffield Hallam University; Open University (MA)

Nicholas Ian Forbes, Baron Forbes of Newcastle CBE (born 8 November 1973) is a British politician who served as the Leader of the Labour Group of the Local Government Association from 2016 to 2022. He was Leader of Newcastle City Council from 2011 to 2022. In 2020, Forbes was appointed to Labour Leader Keir Starmer's Shadow Cabinet, serving until 2022.

== Early life ==
Nicholas Ian Forbes was born on 8 November 1973 in County Durham. He is openly gay and a patron of LGBT+ Labour.

Forbes attended Wolsingham Comprehensive School in Weardale, County Durham, before studying social and political sciences at Selwyn College, Cambridge, where he obtained an upper second class honours degree. He later studied for a management diploma from Sheffield Hallam University, and a master's degree in music from the Open University.

== Political career ==
Nick Forbes became a councillor in May 2000, representing the Westgate part of the city, and went on to become leader of the Labour group in May 2007. In 2011, he became leader of the council following the 2011 local elections which saw the Liberal Democrats suffer heavy losses across the city, as well as nationally. He has been an extensive critic of the government's fiscal policy of cuts in funding to local government, and defended a policy of particularly cutting arts funding in the city in response. Forbes is critical of Universal Credit. During his time as council leader, he negotiated one of the first round of City Deals with government to give the city new financial powers. The subsequent Accelerated Development Zone lead to securing a devolution deal, which became the North of Tyne Combined Authority.

In February 2016, Forbes succeeded Jim McMahon as Labour's leader of the Local Government Association. According to the LGA's website, Forbes "has played a leading role in raising the profile of local government in a time of austerity made economic growth a key feature of his council, securing new financial powers by negotiating one of the first round of City Deals with government. He has worked with leaders from across England to secure devolution packages for local government." Forbes also served as the LGA's Senior Vice Chair.

In 2019, Forbes unsuccessfully sought selection to be Labour's candidate in the 2019 North of Tyne mayoral election, losing to Jamie Driscoll. Following his deselection by the Labour branch in his Arthur's Hill seat ahead of the 2022 council election, Forbes stepped down as Labour group leader and subsequently stepped down as leader of the city council on 5 May 2022.

He then became Engagement Director for the Purpose Coalition, comprising innovative purpose-led leaders and organisations committed to breaking down barriers to opportunity across the country, chairing its Break Down Barriers Commission designed to encourage businesses and organisations to play responsible parts of society by "breaking down barriers to opportunity for their customers, colleagues and communities."

In May 2026, he was appointed President of the Capital City College Group, the largest further education provider in London. He is Honorary Member of Court in the Executive and Governance Office of Newcastle University.

== Honours ==
Forbes was made a Commander of the Order of the British Empire (CBE) in the 2019 New Year Honours for services to local government.

In December 2025, Newcastle University awarded Forbes an Honorary Doctor of Civil Law. In the same month, as part of the 2025 Political Peerages, Forbes—described in the government announcement as "Chair, Breaking Down Barriers Commission and former Labour Leader, Newcastle City Council"—was nominated by prime minister Keir Starmer for a life peerage and to sit in the House of Lords. On 9 January 2026, he was created Baron Forbes of Newcastle, of Heaton in the City of Newcastle upon Tyne.
