= Newcastle City Council =

Local government body in England

Type
- Type: Metropolitan borough council

Leadership
- Lord Mayor: Henry Gallagher, Liberal Democrat since 28 May 2025
- Leader: Colin Ferguson, Liberal Democrat since 27 May 2026
- Chief Executive: Pam Smith since January 2022

Structure
- Seats: 78 councillors
- Graph of the party split among 78 seats.
- Political groups: Administration (25) Liberal Democrats (25) Confidence and supply (24) Green (24) Other parties (29) Reform (23) Labour (2) Independent (4)
- Joint committees: North East Mayoral Strategic Authority
- Length of term: 4 years

Elections
- Voting system: First past the post
- Last election: 7 May 2026
- Next election: 6 May 2027

Meeting place
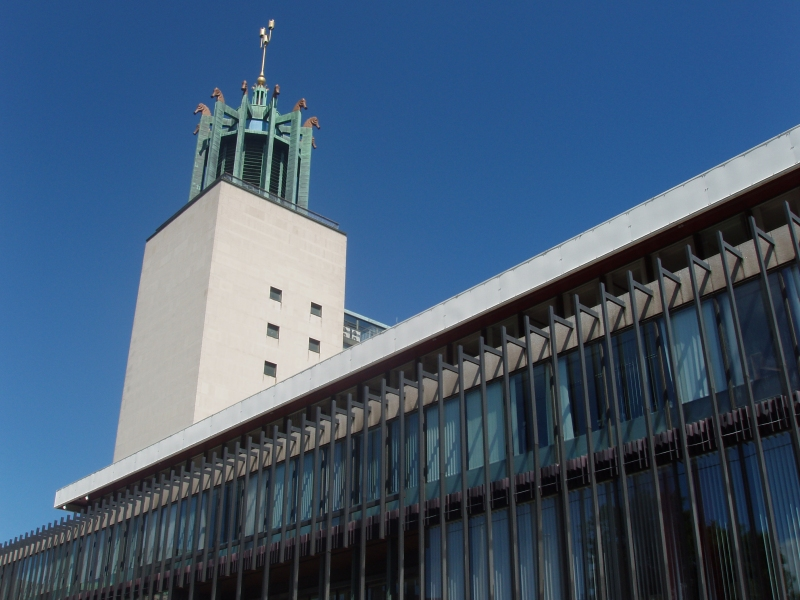
- Civic Centre, Barras Bridge, Newcastle upon Tyne, NE1 8QH

Website
- www.newcastle.gov.uk

Newcastle City Council is the local authority for the city of Newcastle upon Tyne in Tyne and Wear, North East England. Newcastle has had a council from medieval times, which has been reformed on numerous occasions. Since 1974, the council has been a metropolitan borough council. In 2024, the council became a member of the North East Combined Authority. The council is based at Newcastle Civic Centre.

At the 2026 local elections, no party won overall control of the council. Subsequently, the Liberal Democrats and the Green Party agreed a confidence and supply arrangement whereby the Liberal Democrats form the administration with the Greens offering support on an issue by issue basis.

== History ==
Newcastle was an ancient borough; it is said to have been made a borough by William II (reigned 1087–1100). In 1400, a new charter from Henry IV gave the borough the right to hold its own courts and appoint its own sheriffs, making it a county corporate, independent from the Sheriff of Northumberland.

Newcastle was reformed to become a municipal borough under the Municipal Corporations Act 1835, which standardised how most boroughs operated across the country. It was then governed by a body formally called the "mayor, aldermen and burgesses of the borough of Newcastle upon Tyne", generally known as the corporation or town council. Newcastle was awarded city status in 1882, after which the corporation was also known as the city council. When elected county councils were established in 1889, Newcastle was considered large enough for its existing corporation to provide county-level services, and so it was made a county borough. In 1906 the city was given the right to appoint a Lord Mayor.

In 1974 the county borough was replaced by a larger metropolitan borough within the new county of Tyne and Wear. Newcastle's city status was transferred to the enlarged borough at the same time.

From 1974 until 1986 the city council was a lower-tier district authority, with Tyne and Wear County Council providing county-level services. The county council was abolished in 1986, since when the city council has again provided both district-level and county-level services, as it had done when it was a county borough prior to 1974. Some functions are provided across Tyne and Wear by joint committees with the other districts.

In 2024 a combined authority was established covering Newcastle, County Durham, Gateshead, North Tyneside, Northumberland, South Tyneside and Sunderland, called the North East Mayoral Combined Authority. It is chaired by the directly elected Mayor of the North East and oversees the delivery of certain strategic functions across the area.

== Governance ==
Since 1986 the council has provided both district-level and county-level functions, with some services being provided through joint arrangements with the other Tyne and Wear councils.

=== Political control ===
The council has been under no overall control since November 2024, when changes of allegiance saw Labour lose the majority it had held on the council since 2011. Following the 2026 election, the council remained under no overall control, with the Liberal Democrats the largest party with 25 seats, closely followed by the Green Party and Reform UK with 24 seats each. The Liberal Democrats and Greens subsequently agreed a deal where the Liberal Democrats form a minority administration, supported by the Greens on a case by case basis.

Political control of the council since the 1974 reforms has been as follows:

| Party in control | Years |
|---|---|
| Labour | 1974–2004 |
| Liberal Democrats | 2004–2011 |
| Labour | 2011–2024 |
| No overall control | 2024–present |

=== Leadership ===
The role of Lord Mayor of Newcastle upon Tyne is largely ceremonial. Political leadership is instead provided by the leader of the council. The leaders since 1959 have been:

County Borough

| Councillor | Party | From | To |
|---|---|---|---|
| T. Dan Smith | Labour | 1959 | May 1965 |
| Frank Butterfield | Labour | May 1965 | May 1966 |
| Bertram Abrahart | Labour | May 1966 | 1967 |
| Arthur Grey | Conservative | 1967 | 1972 |
| John Cox | Conservative | 1972 | 1974 |

Metropolitan Borough

| Councillor | Party | From | To |
|---|---|---|---|
| Tom Collins | Labour | 1 Apr 1974 | 1977 |
| Jeremy Beecham | Labour | 1977 | 1994 |
| Tony Flynn | Labour | 1994 | 2004 |
| Peter Arnold | Liberal Democrats | 2004 | 2006 |
| John Shipley | Liberal Democrats | 2006 | 1 Sep 2010 |
| David Faulkner | Liberal Democrats | 1 Sep 2010 | May 2011 |
| Nick Forbes | Labour | 25 May 2011 | May 2022 |
| Nick Kemp | Labour | 25 May 2022 | 20 Sep 2024 |
| Karen Kilgour | Labour | 2 Oct 2024 | May 2026 |
| Colin Ferguson | Liberal Democrats | 27 May 2026 | |

=== Composition ===
Following the 2026 election, and subsequent by-elections and changes of allegiance up to September 2026, the composition of the council was:

| Party | Seats |
|---|---|
| Liberal Democrats | 25 |
| Green | 23 |
| Reform | 23 |
| Labour | 2 |
| Independent | 5 |
| Total | 78 |

The next election is in 2027.

== Elections ==
Since its reformation as a metropolitan borough council in 1974, the council has comprised 78 councillors representing 26 wards, with each ward electing three councillors. Elections are held three years out of every four, with a third of the council (one councillor for each ward) elected each time for a four-year term of office. New ward boundaries took effect for the 2026 election following a review. As such, the 2026 election was for all councillors, after which the pattern of electing a third of the council at a time will resume from the 2027 elections.

=== Wards ===
The wards are:

- Arthur's Hill
- Benwell, Scotswood and Denton Burn
- Blakelaw and Cowgate
- Byker
- Castle
- Chapel
- Dene and South Gosforth
- Denton and Westerhope
- Elswick
- Fawdon and West Gosforth
- Gosforth
- Heaton
- Jesmond
- Kenton
- Kingston Park and Dinnington
- Lemington
- Manor Park
- Monument
- Newbigging Hall and Callerton
- Ouseburn
- Parklands and North Gosforth (New ward name for 2026)
- Throckley, Walbottle and Newburn
- Walker
- Walkergate
- West Fenham
- Wingrove

== Premises ==
The council is based at the Civic Centre on Barras Bridge. It was purpose-built for the council in phases between 1956 and 1967. The finished complex was formally opened on 14 November 1968 by King Olav V of Norway.

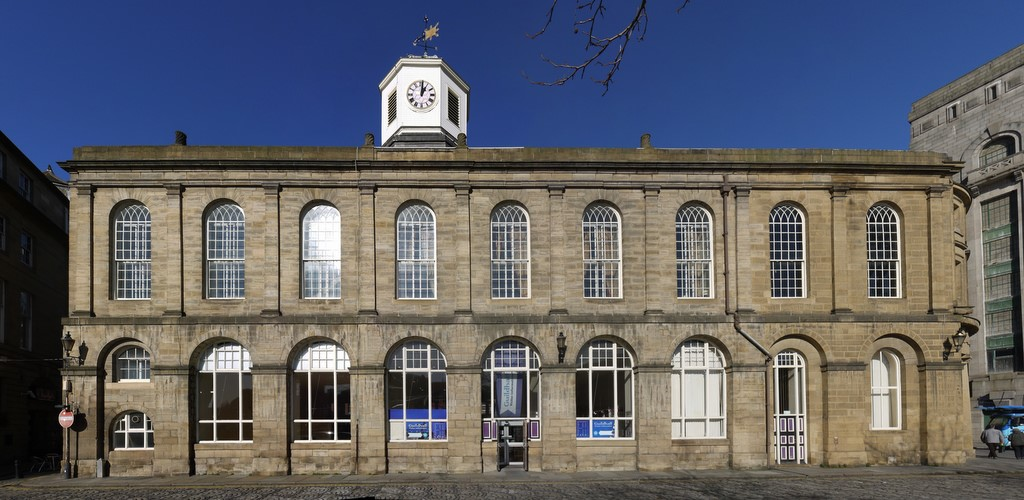
Guildhall: Council's meeting place 1655–1863

The Civic Centre replaced Newcastle Town Hall, which had been built in 1863 in St Nicholas Square, and was subsequently demolished in 1973. The Town Hall in turn had replaced the Guildhall on Sandhill, which had been built in 1655 on a site which had been used for the town's guildhall since at least the thirteenth century.

== See also ==
- Newcastle Upon Tyne Youth Council
- List of mayors of Newcastle-upon-Tyne
