= List of electoral wards in Tyne and Wear =

This is a list of electoral divisions and wards in the ceremonial county of Tyne and Wear in North East England. All changes since the re-organisation of local government following the passing of the Local Government Act 1972 are shown. The number of councillors elected for each electoral division or ward is shown in brackets.

== District councils ==
=== Gateshead ===
Wards from 1 April 1974 (first election 10 May 1973) to 6 May 1982:

Wards from 6 May 1982 to 10 June 2004:

Wards from 10 June 2004 to 7 May 2026:

1. Birtley (3)
2. Blaydon (3)
3. Bridges (3)
4. Chopwell & Rowlands Gill (3)
5. Chowdene (3)
6. Crawcrook & Greenside (3)
7. Deckham (3)
8. Dunston & Teams (3)
9. Dunston Hill & Whickham East (3)
10. Felling (3)
11. High Fell (3)
12. Lamesley (3)
13. Lobley Hill & Bensham (3)
14. Low Fell (3)
15. Pelaw & Heworth (3)
16. Ryton, Crookhill & Stella (3)
17. Saltwell (3)
18. Wardley & Leam Lane (3)
19. Whickham North (3)
20. Whickham South & Sunniside (3)
21. Windy Nook & Whitehills (3)
22. Winlaton & High Spen (3)

Wards from 7 May 2026 to present:

1. Birtley North and Lamesley (3)
2. Birtley South (3)
3. Blaydon (3)
4. Bridges (3)
5. Chopwell and Rowlands Gill (3)
6. Chowdene (3)
7. Crawcrook and Greenside (3)
8. Deckham (3)
9. Dunston Hill and Whickham East (3)
10. Dunston Teams and Riverside (3)
11. Felling (3)
12. High Fell (3)
13. Lobley Hill and Bensham (3)
14. Low Fell (3)
15. Pelaw Heworth and Bill Quay (3)
16. Ryton Crookhill and Stella (3)
17. Saltwell (3)
18. Wardley and Leam Lane (3)
19. Whickham North and Swalwell (3)
20. Whickham South and Sunniside (3)
21. Windy Nook and Whitehills (3)
22. Winlaton and High Spen (3)

=== Newcastle upon Tyne ===
Wards from 1 April 1974 (first election 10 May 1973) to 6 May 1982:

Wards from 6 May 1982 to 10 June 2004:

Wards from 10 June 2004 to 3 June 2018:

1. Benwell & Scotswood (3)
2. Blakelaw (3)
3. Byker (3)
4. Castle (3)
5. Dene (3)
6. Denton (3)
7. East Gosforth (3)
8. Elswick (3)
9. Fawdon (3)
10. Fenham (3)
11. Kenton (3)
12. Lemington (3)
13. Newburn (3)
14. North Heaton (3)
15. North Jesmond (3)
16. Ouseburn (3)
17. Parklands (3)
18. South Heaton (3)
19. South Jesmond (3)
20. Walker (3)
21. Walkergate (3)
22. Westerhope (3)
23. Westgate (3)
24. West Gosforth (3)
25. Wingrove (3)
26. Woolsington (3)

Wards from 3 May 2018 to 7 May 2026:

1. Arthur's Hill (3)
2. Benwell and Scotswood (3)
3. Blakelaw (3)
4. Byker (3)
5. Callerton and Throckley (3)
6. Castle (3)
7. Chapel (3)
8. Dene and South Gosforth (3)
9. Denton and Westerhope (3)
10. Elswick (3)
11. Fawdon and West Gosforth (3)
12. Gosforth (3)
13. Heaton (3)
14. Kenton (3)
15. Kingston Park South and Newbiggin Hall (3)
16. Lemington (3)
17. Manor Park (3)
18. Monument (3)
19. North Jesmond (3)
20. Ouseburn (3)
21. Parklands (3)
22. South Jesmond (3)
23. Walker (3)
24. Walkergate (3)
25. West Fenham (3)
26. Wingrove (3)

Wards from 7 May 2026 to present:

1. Arthur's Hill (3)
2. Benwell, Scotswood and Denton Burn (3)
3. Blakelaw and Cowgate (3)
4. Byker (3)
5. Castle (3)
6. Chapel (3)
7. Dene and South Gosforth (3)
8. Denton and Westerhope (3)
9. Elswick (3)
10. Fawdon and West Gosforth (3)
11. Gosforth (3)
12. Heaton (3)
13. Jesmond (3)
14. Kenton (3)
15. Kingston Park and Dinnington (3)
16. Lemington (3)
17. Manor Park (3)
18. Monument (3)
19. Newbiggin Hall and Callerton (3)
20. Ouseburn (3)
21. Parklands and North Gosforth (3)
22. Throckley, Walbottle and Newburn (3)
23. Walker (3)
24. Walkergate (3)
25. West Fenham (3)
26. Wingrove (3)

=== North Tyneside ===
Wards from 1 April 1974 (first election 10 May 1973) to 6 May 1982:

Wards from 6 May 1982 to 10 June 2004:

Wards from 10 June 2004 to 2 May 2024:

1. Battle Hill (3)
2. Benton (3)
3. Camperdown (3)
4. Chirton (3)
5. Collingwood (3)
6. Cullercoats (3)
7. Howdon (3)
8. Killingworth (3)
9. Longbenton (3)
10. Monkseaton North (3)
11. Monkseaton South (3)
12. Northumberland (3)
13. Preston (3)
14. Riverside (3)
15. St Mary's (3)
16. Tynemouth (3)
17. Valley (3)
18. Wallsend (3)
19. Weetslade (3)
20. Whitley Bay (3)

Wards from 2 May 2024 to present:

1. Backworth & Holystone
2. Battle Hill
3. Camperdown
4. Chirton & Percy Main
5. Cullercoats & Whitley Bay South
6. Forest Hall
7. Howdon
8. Killingworth
9. Longbenton & Benton
10. Monkseaton
11. New York & Murton
12. North Shields
13. Preston with Preston Grange
14. Shiremoor
15. St Mary’s
16. Tynemouth
17. Wallsend Central
18. Wallsend North
19. Weetslade
20. Whitley Bay North

=== South Tyneside ===
Wards from 1 April 1974 (first election 10 May 1973) to 6 May 1982:

Wards from 6 May 1982 to 10 June 2004:

Wards from 10 June 2004 to 7 May 2026:

1. Beacon & Bents (3)
2. Bede (3)
3. Biddick & All Saints (3)
4. Boldon Colliery (3)
5. Cleadon & East Boldon (3)
6. Cleadon Park (3)
7. Fellgate & Hedworth (3)
8. Harton (3)
9. Hebburn North (3)
10. Hebburn South (3)
11. Horsley Hill (3)
12. Monkton (3)
13. Primrose (3)
14. Simonside & Rekendyke (3)
15. Westoe (3)
16. West Park (3)
17. Whitburn & Marsden (3)
18. Whiteleas (3)

Wards from 7 May 2026 to present:

1. Beacon & Bents (3)
2. Bede (3)
3. Biddick & All Saints (3)
4. Boldon Colliery (3)
5. Cleadon Park and Harton Moor (3)
6. Cleadon Village and East Boldon (3)
7. Fellgate & Hedworth (3)
8. Harton (3)
9. Hebburn North (3)
10. Hebburn South (3)
11. Horsley Hill and Westoe Crown (3)
12. Monkton (3)
13. Primrose (3)
14. Simonside & Rekendyke (3)
15. West Park (3)
16. Westoe (3)
17. Whitburn & Marsden (3)
18. Whiteleas (3)

=== Sunderland ===
Wards from 1 April 1974 (first election 10 May 1973) to 6 May 1982:

Wards from 6 May 1982 to 10 June 2004:

Wards from 10 June 2004 to 7 May 2026:

1. Barnes (3)
2. Castle (3)
3. Copt Hill (3)
4. Doxford (3)
5. Fulwell (3)
6. Hendon (3)
7. Hetton (3)
8. Houghton (3)
9. Millfield (3)
10. Pallion (3)
11. Redhill (3)
12. Ryhope (3)
13. St Anne's (3)
14. St Chad's (3)
15. St Michael's (3)
16. St Peter's (3)
17. Sandhill (3)
18. Shiney Row (3)
19. Silksworth (3)
20. Southwick (3)
21. Washington Central (3)
22. Washington East (3)
23. Washington North (3)
24. Washington South (3)
25. Washington West (3)

Wards from 7 May 2026 to present:

1. Barnes & Thornhill (3)
2. Deptford & Hendon (3)
3. Doxford Park (3)
4. Farringdon & Silksworth (3)
5. Fulwell (3)
6. Grangetown (3)
7. Grindon & Thorney Close (3)
8. Herrington & Newbottle (3)
9. Hetton (3)
10. Houghton North (3)
11. Houghton South & Hetton Downs (3)
12. Hylton Castle (3)
13. Pallion & Ford (3)
14. Pennywell & South Hylton (3)
15. Penshaw & Shiney Row (3)
16. Redhouse (3)
17. Roker (3)
18. Ryhope (3)
19. Southwick (3)
20. Tunstall & Humbledon (3)
21. Washington Central (3)
22. Washington East (3)
23. Washington North (3)
24. Washington South (3)
25. Washington West (3)

== Former county council ==
=== Tyne and Wear ===
Electoral Divisions from 1 April 1974 (first election 12 April 1973) to 1 April 1986 (county abolished):

1. Benwell (1)
2. Bishopswearmouth (1)
3. Blakelaw (1)
4. Blaydon (Central) (1)
5. Blaydon (East) (1)
6. Blaydon (West) (1)
7. Boldon (1)
8. Castle Ward No. 1 (1)
9. Castle Ward No. 2 (1)
10. Castleton & Hylton (1)
11. Central (1)
12. Chester-le-Street (2)
13. Colliery (1)
14. Dene (1)
15. Deptford & Pallion (1)
16. Downhill (1)
17. East City (1)
18. Elswick (1)
19. Fawdon (1)
20. Felling No. 1 (1)
21. Felling No. 2 (1)
22. Felling No. 3 (1)
23. Fenham (1)
24. Ford & Pennywell (1)
25. Fulwell (1)
26. Gateshead No. 1 (2)
27. Gateshead No. 2 (2)
28. Gateshead No. 3 (2)
29. Gateshead No. 4 (Wrekenton) (2)
30. Gosforth No. 1 (1)
31. Gosforth No. 2 (1)
32. Heaton (1)
33. Hebburn No. 1 (1)
34. Hebburn No. 2 (1)
35. Hendon (1)
36. Hetton No. 1 (1)
37. Hetton No. 2 (1)
38. Houghton-le-Spring No. 1 (1)
39. Houghton-le-Spring No. 2 (1)
40. Houghton-le-Spring No. 3 (1)
41. Humbledon (1)
42. Jarrow No. 1 (1)
43. Jarrow No. 2 (1)
44. Jesmond (1)
45. Kenton (1)
46. Longbenton No. 1 (1)
47. Longbenton No. 2 (1)
48. Longbenton No. 3 (1)
49. Longbenton No. 4 (1)
50. Monkwearmouth & Roker (1)
51. Moorside (1)
52. Newburn No. 1 (1)
53. Newburn No. 2 (1)
54. Newburn No. 3 (1)
55. Ryhope with Burdon (1)
56. Ryton (1)
57. Sandyford (1)
58. Scotswood (1)
59. Seaton Valley (Backworth & Earsdon) (1)
60. Silksworth (1)
61. South Shields No. 1 (1)
62. South Shields No. 2 (2)
63. South Shields No. 3 (2)
64. South Shields No. 4 (2)
65. South Shields No. 5 (1)
66. South Shields No. 6 (1)
67. Southwick (1)
68. St Anthonys (1)
69. St Chads (1)
70. St Lawrence (1)
71. St Michaels (1)
72. Thorney Close (1)
73. Thornhill (1)
74. Tynemouth No. 1 (1)
75. Tynemouth No. 2 (2)
76. Tynemouth No. 3 (1)
77. Tynemouth No. 4 (1)
78. Tynemouth No. 5 (1)
79. Walker (1)
80. Walkergate (1)
81. Wallsend No. 1 (1)
82. Wallsend No. 2 (1)
83. Wallsend No. 3 (1)
84. Wallsend No. 4 (1)
85. Washington No. 1 (1)
86. Washington No. 2 (1)
87. West City (1)
88. Whickham No. 1 (Dunston) (1)
89. Whickham No. 2 (1)
90. Whickham No. 3 (1)
91. Whitburn (1)
92. Whitley Bay No. 1 (1)
93. Whitley Bay No. 2 (1)
94. Whitley Bay No. 3 (1)
95. Wingrove (1)

== Electoral wards by constituency ==
Wards as they existed on 1 December 2020.

=== Blaydon and Consett (part) ===
Gateshead: Blaydon; Chopwell & Rowlands Gill; Crawcrook & Greenside; Ryton, Crookhill & Stella; Winlaton & High Spen.

=== Cramlington and Killingworth (part) ===
Newcastle upon Tyne: Castle (polling districts F01, F02 & F03).

North Tyneside: Camperdown; Killingworth; Valley; Weetslade.

=== Gateshead Central and Whickham ===
Gateshead: Bridges; Chowdene; Deckham; Dunston & Teams; Dunston Hill & Whickham East; High Fell; Lobley Hill & Bensham; Low Fell; Saltwell; Whickham North; Whickham South & Sunniside.

=== Hexham (part) ===
Newcastle-upon-Tyne: Callerton & Throckley.

=== Houghton and Sunderland South ===
Sunderland: Copt Hill; Doxford; Hetton; Houghton; St. Anne’s; St. Chad’s; Sandhill; Shiney Row; Silksworth.

=== Jarrow and Gateshead East ===
Gateshead: Felling; Pelaw & Heworth; Wardley & Leam Lane; Windy Nook & Whitehills.

South Tyneside: Bede; Boldon Colliery; Fellgate & Hedworth; Hebburn North; Hebburn South; Monkton; Primrose.

=== Newcastle upon Tyne Central and West ===
Newcastle upon Tyne: Arthur’s Hill; Benwell & Scotswood; Blakelaw; Chapel; Denton & Westerhope; Elswick; Kingston Park South & Newbiggin Hall (polling districts O01, O02 & O03); Lemington; Monument; West Fenham; Wingrove.

=== Newcastle upon Tyne East and Wallsend ===
Newcastle upon Tyne: Byker; Heaton; Manor Park; Ouseburn; Walker; Walkergate.

North Tyneside: Battle Hill; Howdon; Northumberland; Riverside (polling districts FA & FB); Wallsend.

=== Newcastle upon Tyne North ===
Newcastle upon Tyne: Castle (polling districts F04, F05 & F06); Dene & South Gosforth; Fawdon & West Gosforth; Gosforth; Kenton; Kingston Park South & Newbiggin Hall (polling district O04); North Jesmond; Parklands; South Jesmond.

North Tyneside: Benton; Longbenton.

=== South Shields ===
South Tyneside: Beacon & Bents; Biddick & All Saints; Cleadon & East Boldon; Cleadon Park; Harton; Horsley Hill; Simonside & Rekendyke; West Park; Westoe; Whitburn & Marsden; Whiteleas.

=== Sunderland Central ===
Sunderland: Barnes; Fulwell; Hendon; Millfield; Pallion; Ryhope; St. Michael’s; St. Peter’s; Southwick.

=== Tynemouth ===
North Tyneside: Chirton; Collingwood; Cullercoats; Monkseaton North; Monkseaton South; Preston; Riverside (polling districts FC, FD, FE, FF, FG & FH); St Mary's; Tynemouth; Whitley Bay.

=== Washington and Gateshead South ===
Gateshead: Birtley; Lamesley.

Sunderland: Castle; Redhill; Washington Central; Washington East; Washington North; Washington South; Washington West.

== See also ==
- List of parliamentary constituencies in Tyne and Wear
