= 1973 Newcastle City Council election =

1973 UK local government election

The first elections to the newly created Newcastle City Council were held on 10 May 1973, with the entirety of the 78 seat council - three seats for each of the 26 wards - up for vote. The Local Government Act 1972 stipulated that the elected members were to shadow and eventually take over from the predecessor corporation on 1 April 1974. The order in which the councillors were elected dictated their term serving, with third-place candidates serving two years and up for re-election in 1975, second-placed three years expiring in 1976 and 1st-placed five years until 1978.

The election resulted in Labour gaining control of the council. Voter turnout was 32.0%.

== Election result ==
Newcastle local election result 1973
Party	Seats	Gains	Losses	Net gain/loss	Seats %	Votes %	Votes	+/−
Labour	51	0	0	0	65.4	52.1	36,858	N/A
Conservative	23	0	0	0	29.5	41.0	28,995	N/A
Independent	3	0	0	0	3.8	3.9	2,752	N/A
Liberal	1	0	0	0	1.3	2.8	1,953	N/A
Communist	0	0	0	0	0.0	0.2	122	N/A

This result had the following consequences for the total number of seats on the council after the elections:

Party	New council
Labour	51
Conservative	23
Independent	3
Liberal	1
Total	78
Working majority	24

== Ward results ==
Benwell
Party	Candidate	Votes	%	±%
Labour	J. Beecham	957	81.5	N/A
Labour	T. Yellowley	908		
Labour	K. Scott	888		
Conservative	V. Hazell	217	18.5	N/A
Majority		740	63.0	N/A
Turnout		1,174	16.7	N/A
Labour win (new seat)				
Labour win (new seat)				
Labour win (new seat)				

Blakelaw
Party	Candidate	Votes	%	±%
Labour	T. Cooney	1,872	75.4	N/A
Labour	E. Burke	1,838		
Labour	H. White	1,785		
Conservative	B. Duncan	610	24.6	N/A
Conservative	R. Holford	549		
Conservative	J. Shenton	539		
Majority		1,262	50.8	N/A
Turnout		2,482	22.5	N/A
Labour win (new seat)				
Labour win (new seat)				
Labour win (new seat)				

Castle
Party	Candidate	Votes	%	±%
Labour	E. Wade	1,334	35.5	N/A
Conservative	J. Petty	1,313	35.0	N/A
Conservative	D. Wood	1,223		
Labour	J. Gill	1,221		
Labour	J. Gant	1,216		
Conservative	H. Cordes	1,206		
Independent	C. Robinson	608	16.2	N/A
Liberal	M. Stewart	498	13.3	N/A
Liberal	P. Barker	437		
Liberal	E. Featherstone	412		
Majority		21	0.6	N/A
Turnout		3,753	57.5	N/A
Labour win (new seat)				
Conservative win (new seat)				
Conservative win (new seat)				

Dene
Party	Candidate	Votes	%	±%
Conservative	R. Gray	2,340	61.8	N/A
Conservative	B. Slater	2,332		
Conservative	A. Evans	2,294		
Labour	N. Mellor	1,449	38.2	N/A
Labour	M. Robson	1,408		
Labour	I. Taylor	1,365		
Majority		891	23.6	N/A
Turnout		3,789	36.5	N/A
Conservative win (new seat)				
Conservative win (new seat)				
Conservative win (new seat)				

East City
Party	Candidate	Votes	%	±%
Labour	Ms. T. Russell	1,051	81.7	N/A
Labour	J. Scott-Batey	988		
Labour	J. Davies	967		
Conservative	J. Slater	235	18.3	N/A
Majority		816	63.5	N/A
Turnout		1,286	26.8	N/A
Labour win (new seat)				
Labour win (new seat)				
Labour win (new seat)				

Elswick
Party	Candidate	Votes	%	±%
Liberal	D. Faulkner	1,455	44.7	N/A
Labour	Ms. J. Lamb	1,299	39.9	N/A
Labour	Ms. D. Starkey	1,240		
Liberal	D. Lesser	1,095		
Labour	J. Mandelson	1,066		
Liberal	H. Regnart	1,044		
Conservative	H. Corbett	500	15.4	N/A
Conservative	H. Maxwell	447		
Conservative	G. Wilkin	411		
Majority		156	4.8	N/A
Turnout		3,254	45.2	N/A
Liberal win (new seat)				
Labour win (new seat)				
Labour win (new seat)				

Fawdon
Party	Candidate	Votes	%	±%
Labour	J. Laing	1,895	69.6	N/A
Labour	E. Pugh	1,875		
Labour	J. Green	1,766		
Conservative	T. Wilkinson	829	30.4	N/A
Conservative	J. Jack	682		
Conservative	H. Kossick	653		
Majority		1,066	39.1	N/A
Turnout		2,724	30.0	N/A
Labour win (new seat)				
Labour win (new seat)				
Labour win (new seat)				

Fenham
Party	Candidate	Votes	%	±%
Conservative	G. Leigh	1,817	65.6	N/A
Conservative	A. Moore	1,799		
Conservative	D. Gilbert	1,738		
Labour	I. Richardson	953	34.4	N/A
Majority		864	31.2	N/A
Turnout		2,770	28.8	N/A
Conservative win (new seat)				
Conservative win (new seat)				
Conservative win (new seat)				

Gosforth #1
Party	Candidate	Votes	%	±%
Conservative	G. Trice	2,559	69.8	N/A
Conservative	J. Slater	2,555		
Conservative	J. Michelson	2,522		
Labour	K. Bergmann	1,107	30.2	N/A
Labour	G. Dixon	1,084		
Labour	T. Hannaby	1,063		
Majority		1,452	39.6	N/A
Turnout		3,666	33.7	N/A
Conservative win (new seat)				
Conservative win (new seat)				
Conservative win (new seat)				

Gosforth #2
Party	Candidate	Votes	%	±%
Conservative	M. Charlton	2,191	63.2	N/A
Conservative	G. Layburn	2,111		
Conservative	J. Sanderson	2,104		
Labour	L. Begg	1,277	36.8	N/A
Labour	B. Taylor	1,225		
Labour	R. Hunter	1,209		
Majority		914	26.4	N/A
Turnout		3,468	45.0	N/A
Conservative win (new seat)				
Conservative win (new seat)				
Conservative win (new seat)				

Heaton
Party	Candidate	Votes	%	±%
Conservative	W. Harding	1,831	63.4	N/A
Conservative	Ms. E. Harding	1,816		
Conservative	F. Dodgin	1,761		
Labour	Ms. D. Cairns	1,055	36.6	N/A
Labour	J. James	1,046		
Labour	O. Walker	1,027		
Majority		776	26.9	N/A
Turnout		2,886	31.3	N/A
Conservative win (new seat)				
Conservative win (new seat)				
Conservative win (new seat)				

Jesmond
Party	Candidate	Votes	%	±%
Independent	Ms. J. Baty	1,621	49.5	N/A
Independent	P. Grant	1,594		
Independent	V. Maddison	1,559		
Conservative	C. Burdon-Taylor	1,229	37.5	N/A
Conservative	D. Thomas	1,155		
Conservative	R. McVain	1,116		
Labour	J. Hugo	427	13.0	N/A
Majority		392	12.0	N/A
Turnout		3,277	34.3	N/A
Independent win (new seat)				
Independent win (new seat)				
Independent win (new seat)				

Kenton
Party	Candidate	Votes	%	±%
Labour	C. Foster	2,377	53.4	N/A
Labour	F. Nicholson	2,357		
Labour	M. Bergman	2,228		
Conservative	J. Cox	2,077	46.6	N/A
Conservative	M. Graham	2,055		
Conservative	R. Lane	2,032		
Majority		300	6.8	N/A
Turnout		4,454	51.1	N/A
Labour win (new seat)				
Labour win (new seat)				
Labour win (new seat)				

Moorside
Party	Candidate	Votes	%	±%
Labour	Ms. M. Murray	1,389	55.3	N/A
Labour	G. Harrison	1,338		
Labour	L. Anwell	1,280		
Conservative	J. Davidson	1,125	44.7	N/A
Conservative	I. Burton	1,071		
Conservative	J. Kaer	1,037		
Majority		264	10.5	N/A
Turnout		2,514	26.2	N/A
Labour win (new seat)				
Labour win (new seat)				
Labour win (new seat)				

Newburn #1
Party	Candidate	Votes	%	±%
Labour	T. Fenton	1,498	62.0	N/A
Labour	C. Stephenson	1,447		
Labour	V. Waddington	1,426		
Conservative	M. Rogerson	920	38.0	N/A
Conservative	W. Forsyth	899		
Conservative	J. Hellawell	899		
Majority		578	23.9	N/A
Turnout		2,418	29.0	N/A
Labour win (new seat)				
Labour win (new seat)				
Labour win (new seat)				

Newburn #2
Party	Candidate	Votes	%	±%
Labour	R. Urwin	3,074	79.0	N/A
Labour	M. Walker	3,074		
Labour	A. Forster	2,953		
Conservative	J. Hill	817	21.0	N/A
Conservative	C. Dempsey	653		
Conservative	R. Baron	639		
Majority		2,257	58.0	N/A
Turnout		3,891	29.7	N/A
Labour win (new seat)				
Labour win (new seat)				
Labour win (new seat)				

Newburn #3
Party	Candidate	Votes	%	±%
Labour	J. Lanaghan	1,501	51.4	N/A
Labour	R. Clarke	1,500		
Labour	J. Murray	1,448		
Conservative	Ms. I. Faith	1,420	48.6	N/A
Conservative	D. McKeag	1,311		
Conservative	W. Weeks	1,277		
Majority		81	2.8	N/A
Turnout		2,921	41.0	N/A
Labour win (new seat)				
Labour win (new seat)				
Labour win (new seat)				

Sandyford
Party	Candidate	Votes	%	±%
Conservative	B. Collins	1,688	61.7	N/A
Conservative	Ms. P. Collins	1,643		
Conservative	P. Martin	1,546		
Labour	J. Higgins	1,048	38.3	N/A
Labour	C. Swainston	1,027		
Labour	P. Slade	1,006		
Majority		640	23.4	N/A
Turnout		2,736	37.1	N/A
Conservative win (new seat)				
Conservative win (new seat)				
Conservative win (new seat)				

Scotswood
Party	Candidate	Votes	%	±%
Labour	H. Russell	1,283	62.7	N/A
Labour	A. Davison	1,259		
Labour	R. Burgess	1,234		
Conservative	W. Thomlinson	763	37.3	N/A
Majority		520	25.4	N/A
Turnout		2,064	26.5	N/A
Labour win (new seat)				
Labour win (new seat)				
Labour win (new seat)				

St. Anthonys
Party	Candidate	Votes	%	±%
Labour	B. Abrahams	1,762	90.9	N/A
Labour	Ms. M. Abrahams	1,633		
Labour	D. Webster	1,571		
Conservative	M. Coote	177	9.1	N/A
Majority		1,585	81.7	N/A
Turnout		1,939	27.3	N/A
Labour win (new seat)				
Labour win (new seat)				
Labour win (new seat)				

St. Lawrence
Party	Candidate	Votes	%	±%
Labour	S. Forster	1,581	87.3	N/A
Labour	Ms. M. Collins	1,574		
Labour	T. Collins	1,560		
Conservative	R. Lungley	230	12.7	N/A
Majority		1,351	74.6	N/A
Turnout		1,811	27.0	N/A
Labour win (new seat)				
Labour win (new seat)				
Labour win (new seat)				

Walker
Party	Candidate	Votes	%	±%
Labour	N. Stockdale	1,725	81.8	N/A
Labour	J. Stanners	1,699		
Labour	G. Drew	1,628		
Conservative	A. Storey	262	12.4	N/A
Conservative	E. Liddell	219		
Conservative	A. Telford	210		
Communist	Ms. N. Manchee	122	5.8	N/A
Majority		1,463	69.4	N/A
Turnout		2,109	21.1	N/A
Labour win (new seat)				
Labour win (new seat)				
Labour win (new seat)				

Walkergate
Party	Candidate	Votes	%	±%
Labour	G. Gray	1,905	59.8	N/A
Labour	O. Cairns	1,793		
Labour	T. Marr	1,650		
Conservative	L. Bulman	1,281	40.2	N/A
Conservative	J. Usher	1,117		
Conservative	J. Hoggins	1,114		
Majority		624	19.6	N/A
Turnout		3,186	33.8	N/A
Labour win (new seat)				
Labour win (new seat)				
Labour win (new seat)				

West City
Party	Candidate	Votes	%	±%
Labour	A. Stabler	984	84.2	N/A
Labour	Ms. I. Steedman	893		
Labour	W. Wilson	881		
Conservative	B. McLeod	184	15.8	N/A
Majority		800	68.5	N/A
Turnout		1,168	18.2	N/A
Labour win (new seat)				
Labour win (new seat)				
Labour win (new seat)				

Wingrove
Party	Candidate	Votes	%	±%
Conservative	N. Trotter	1,651	68.3	N/A
Conservative	Ms. O. Kaer	1,570		
Conservative	P. Wardropper	1,556		
Labour	R. Bailey	765	31.7	N/A
Labour	S. Cohen	742		
Labour	T. Palmer	728		
Majority		886	36.7	N/A
Turnout		2,416	30.5	N/A
Conservative win (new seat)				
Conservative win (new seat)				
Conservative win (new seat)				

Woolsington
Party	Candidate	Votes	%	±%
Labour	S. Allen	1,290	50.7	N/A
Labour	E. Smith	1,238		
Labour	J. Kerrigan	1,201		
Conservative	A. Rotherford	729	28.7	N/A
Conservative	L. Kirby	707		
Conservative	R. Berstone	675		
Independent	T. Johnson	523	20.6	N/A
Independent	J. Squires	426		
Majority		561	22.0	N/A
Turnout		2,542		N/A
Labour win (new seat)				
Labour win (new seat)				
Labour win (new seat)				
