= Newcastle upon Tyne Central and West =

UK Parliament constituency (since 2024)

Coordinates: 54.98°N 1.67°W

- Borough constituency for the House of Commons
- Interactive map of boundaries since 2024
- Location within North East England
- County: Tyne and Wear
- Electorate: 76,460 (March 2020)
- Major settlements: Newcastle City Centre

Current constituency
- Created: 2024
- Member of Parliament: Chi Onwurah (Labour)
- Seats: One
- Created from: Newcastle upon Tyne Central; Newcastle upon Tyne North (part)

Newcastle upon Tyne Central and West is a constituency of the House of Commons in the UK Parliament. Created as a result of the 2023 review of Westminster constituencies, it was first contested at the 2024 general election and is currently held by Chi Onwurah of the Labour Party, who previously held the abolished constituency of Newcastle upon Tyne Central from 2010 to 2024.

== Constituency profile ==
Newcastle upon Tyne Central and West is a constituency in Tyne and Wear, covering the city centre of Newcastle upon Tyne and the neighbourhoods to its west, including Arthur's Hill, Elswick, Benwell, Fenham, Blakelaw, Denton, Westerhope and Lemington.

Newcastle upon Tyne has Roman-era origins as a fortress city and was urbanised during the Industrial Revolution as a leading centre for shipbuilding and heavy industry. Many of this constituency's neighbourhoods were originally coal mining villages developed during the Victorian era. There are two universities in the city centre, Newcastle University and Northumbria University, which together have around 57,000 students. The constituency is highly-deprived, especially so in the neighbourhoods immediately west of the city centre which suffered from the decline of the shipbuilding industry in the late 20th century. The average house price is similar to the rest of North East England and around half the national average.

Newcastle upon Tyne Central and West has a young population; there is a large proportion of students and few retirees. In general, residents have average levels of education and are likely to live in private rented accommodation. Household income is low and the rate of child poverty is high. A high proportion of residents work in the health and education sectors and the percentage claiming unemployment benefits is high. White people made up 73% of the population at the 2021 census. Asians were the largest ethnic minority group at 17%, including large Bangladeshi and Chinese communities. The Asian population were mostly concentrated in Elswick, where they made up around a third of residents.

At the local city council, the city centre and the neighbourhoods to its immediate west are represented by Green Party councillors whilst the outer western districts elected Reform UK representatives. An estimated 55% of voters in the constituency supported leaving the European Union in the 2016 referendum, marginally higher than the nationwide figure of 52%.

== Boundaries ==
Under the 2023 boundary review, the constituency was defined as comprising the following wards of the City of Newcastle upon Tyne (as they existed on 1 December 2020):

- Arthur's Hill; Benwell and Scotswood; Blakelaw; Chapel; Denton & Westerhope; Elswick; Kingston Park South & Newbiggin Hall (part); Lemington; Monument; West Fenham; Wingrove.

Following a local government boundary review which came into effect in May 2026, the constituency now comprises the following wards or part wards of the City of Newcastle upon Tyne:

- Arthur's Hill; Benwell, Scotswood & Denton Burn; Blakelaw & Cowgate; Chapel; Denton & Westerhope; Elswick; Lemington; Monument; Newbiggin Hall & Callerton (most, excluding the village of Callerton); West Fenham; Wingrove; and very small parts of Jesmond, Ouseburn, and Throckley, Wallbottle & Newburn.

The seat comprises the bulk of the abolished constituency of Newcastle upon Tyne Central, extended westwards to include the districts of Denton, Lemington, Westerhope and Newbiggin Hall, previously part of Newcastle upon Tyne North.

== Members of Parliament ==
Newcastle upon Tyne Central prior to 2024

Election	Member	Party
2024	Chi Onwurah	Labour

== Elections ==
=== Elections in the 2020s ===
General election 2024: Newcastle upon Tyne Central and West
Party	Candidate	Votes	%	±%
Labour	Chi Onwurah	18,875	45.6	−13.7
Reform	Ashton Muncaster	7,815	18.9	+10.7
Conservative	Frances Lasok	4,228	10.2	−16.4
Independent	Yvonne Ridley	3,627	8.8	N/A
Green	John Pearson	3,228	7.8	+4.8
Liberal Democrats	Ali Avaei	1,946	4.7	+1.7
Independent	Habib Rahman	1,636	4.0	N/A
Majority		11,060	26.7	−6.0
Turnout		41,355	53.7	−9.3
Labour win (new seat)				

=== Elections in the 2010s ===
2019 notional result
Party	Vote	%
Labour	28,520	59.3
Conservative	12,789	26.6
Brexit	3,934	8.2
Green	1,462	3.0
Liberal Democrats	1,430	3.0
Turnout	48,135	63.0
Electorate	76,460	

== See also ==
- List of parliamentary constituencies in Tyne and Wear
- List of parliamentary constituencies in North East England (region)
