= NE postcode area =

Postcode area within the United Kingdom

Newcastle upon Tyne
- Postcode area
- Location within the United Kingdom
- Coordinates: 55.041°N 1.651°W
- Sovereign state: United Kingdom
- Postcode area: NE
- Postcode area name: Newcastle upon Tyne
- Post towns: 34
- Postcode districts: 67
- Postcode sectors: 230
- Postcodes (live): 33,157
- Postcodes (total): 45,070
- Statistics as at May 2020

The NE postcode area, also known as the Newcastle upon Tyne postcode area, is a group of 61 postcode districts in north-east England covering 34 post towns. These cover most of Tyne and Wear (including Newcastle upon Tyne, Gateshead, North Shields, South Shields, Wallsend, Whitley Bay, Hebburn, Jarrow, Washington, Blaydon-on-Tyne, East Boldon, Boldon Colliery, Rowlands Gill and Ryton) and Northumberland (including Blyth, Morpeth, Hexham, Alnwick, Cramlington, Bedlington, Ashington, Prudhoe, Bamburgh, Riding Mill, Choppington, Corbridge, Seahouses, Newbiggin-by-the-Sea, Stocksfield, Haltwhistle, Wylam, Chathill, Belford and Wooler), plus a small part of northern County Durham. The NE postcode area is one of six with a population above 1 million.

Mail for the NE postcode area is processed at Tyneside Mail Centre in Gateshead, along with mail for the DH, DL, SR and TS postcode areas.

== History ==
The original NE postal district was created as part of the London postal district in 1858, covering north east London. It was abolished, along with the S postal district covering south London, in 1866.

== Coverage ==
The approximate coverage of the postcode districts:

Postcode district	Post town	Coverage	Local authority area(s)
NE1	NEWCASTLE UPON TYNE	City Centre, Newcastle Quayside	City of Newcastle upon Tyne
NE2	NEWCASTLE UPON TYNE	City Centre, Jesmond, Sandyford, Spital Tongues, Shieldfield	City of Newcastle upon Tyne
NE3	NEWCASTLE UPON TYNE	Gosforth, Fawdon, Kingston Park, Kenton, Great Park	City of Newcastle upon Tyne
NE4	NEWCASTLE UPON TYNE	City Centre, Arthurs Hill, Elswick, Wingrove, Benwell, Fenham	City of Newcastle upon Tyne
NE5	NEWCASTLE UPON TYNE	Blakelaw, Cowgate, Denton, Westerhope	City of Newcastle upon Tyne
NE6	NEWCASTLE UPON TYNE	Heaton, Byker, Walker, Walkergate	City of Newcastle upon Tyne
NE7	NEWCASTLE UPON TYNE	Heaton, Gosforth, Benton	City of Newcastle upon Tyne
NE8	GATESHEAD	Gateshead Quayside, Gateshead Town, Bensham	Metropolitan Borough of Gateshead
NE9	GATESHEAD	Low Fell, Springwell, Wrekenton, Beacon Lough	Metropolitan Borough of Gateshead, City of Sunderland
NE10	GATESHEAD	Felling, Whitehills Estate, Leam Lane, Pelaw, Bill Quay	Metropolitan Borough of Gateshead
NE11	GATESHEAD	Dunston, Kibblesworth, Team Valley, MetroCentre	Metropolitan Borough of Gateshead
NE12	NEWCASTLE UPON TYNE	Longbenton, Killingworth, Benton	City of Newcastle upon Tyne, Metropolitan Borough of North Tyneside
NE13	NEWCASTLE UPON TYNE	Newcastle International Airport, Wideopen, Great Park, Dinnington, Woolsington, Hazlerigg, Blagdon, Seaton Burn	City of Newcastle upon Tyne, Metropolitan Borough of North Tyneside, Northumberland
NE15	NEWCASTLE UPON TYNE	Lemington, Throckley, Newburn, Fenham, Benwell, Scotswood	City of Newcastle upon Tyne
NE16	NEWCASTLE UPON TYNE	Whickham, Sunniside, Burnopfield	City of Newcastle upon Tyne, Metropolitan Borough of Gateshead, County Durham
NE17	NEWCASTLE UPON TYNE	Chopwell, Western Chopwell Wood	Metropolitan Borough of Gateshead
NE18	NEWCASTLE UPON TYNE	Stamfordham, Dalton	Northumberland
NE19	NEWCASTLE UPON TYNE	Byrness, Otterburn	Northumberland
NE20	NEWCASTLE UPON TYNE	Ponteland	Northumberland, City of Newcastle upon Tyne
NE21	BLAYDON-ON-TYNE	Blaydon, Winlaton	Metropolitan Borough of Gateshead
NE22	BEDLINGTON	Bedlington, Hartford Bridge	Northumberland
NE23	CRAMLINGTON	Cramlington, Seghill	Northumberland
NE24	BLYTH	Blyth, Newsham, Cowpen, Cambois	Northumberland
NE25	WHITLEY BAY	Monkseaton, Earsdon, New Hartley, Holywell, Seaton Delaval	Metropolitan Borough of North Tyneside, Northumberland
NE26	WHITLEY BAY	Whitley Bay, Seaton Sluice	Metropolitan Borough of North Tyneside, Northumberland
NE27	NEWCASTLE UPON TYNE	Shiremoor, West Allotment, Backworth, Holystone, Murton Village	Metropolitan Borough of North Tyneside
NE28	WALLSEND	Walker, Battle Hill, Willington, Wallsend, North Tyne Tunnel	City of Newcastle upon Tyne, Metropolitan Borough of North Tyneside
NE29	NORTH SHIELDS	North Shields, Royal Quays, Billy Mill, New York	North Tyneside
NE30	NORTH SHIELDS	Marden, Tynemouth, Cullercoats	Metropolitan Borough of North Tyneside
NE31	HEBBURN	Hebburn	Metropolitan Borough of South Tyneside
NE32	JARROW	Jarrow, Fellgate, South Tyne Tunnel	Metropolitan Borough of South Tyneside
NE33	SOUTH SHIELDS	Town Centre, Deans, Westoe, High Shields	Metropolitan Borough of South Tyneside
NE34	SOUTH SHIELDS	Harton, Horsley Hill, Marsden, Simonside, Brockley Whins	Metropolitan Borough of South Tyneside
NE35	BOLDON COLLIERY	Boldon Colliery	Metropolitan Borough of South Tyneside
NE36	EAST BOLDON	East Boldon, West Boldon	Metropolitan Borough of South Tyneside
NE37	WASHINGTON	Usworth, Sulgrave, Albany	City of Sunderland
NE38	WASHINGTON	Town Centre, Oxclose, Fatfield, Harraton	City of Sunderland
NE39	ROWLANDS GILL	Rowlands Gill, High Spen, Hamsterley Mill, Eastern Chopwell Wood	Metropolitan Borough of Gateshead, County Durham
NE40	RYTON	Ryton, Crawcrook, Greenside	Metropolitan Borough of Gateshead
NE41	WYLAM	Wylam	Metropolitan Borough of Gateshead, Northumberland
NE42	PRUDHOE	Prudhoe	Northumberland
NE43	STOCKSFIELD	Stocksfield	Northumberland
NE44	RIDING MILL	Riding Mill, Broomhaugh	Northumberland
NE45	CORBRIDGE	Corbridge	Northumberland
NE46	HEXHAM	Hexham	Northumberland
NE47	HEXHAM	Acomb, Hexhamshire	Northumberland
NE48	HEXHAM	Falstone, Kielder	Northumberland
NE49	HALTWHISTLE	Haltwhistle	Northumberland
NE61	MORPETH	Morpeth, Tranwell, Clifton, Hepscott, Mitford	Northumberland
NE62	CHOPPINGTON	Scotland Gate, Guidepost, Stakeford, West Sleekburn, Bomarsund	Northumberland
NE63	ASHINGTON	Ashington	Northumberland
NE64	NEWBIGGIN-BY-THE-SEA	Newbiggin-by-the-Sea	Northumberland
NE65	MORPETH	Amble, Coquet Valley	Northumberland
NE66	ALNWICK	Alnwick, Shilbottle	Northumberland
NE67	CHATHILL	Chathill, Beadnell	Northumberland
NE68	SEAHOUSES	Seahouses	Northumberland
NE69	BAMBURGH	Bamburgh	Northumberland
NE70	BELFORD	Belford	Northumberland
NE71	WOOLER	Wooler	Northumberland
NE82	NEWCASTLE UPON TYNE	BT Group	non-geographic
NE83	NEWCASTLE UPON TYNE	BT Group	non-geographic
NE85	NEWCASTLE UPON TYNE	Spark Response Ltd	non-geographic
NE88	NEWCASTLE UPON TYNE	HM Revenue and Customs (Child Benefit Centre)	non-geographic
NE92	GATESHEAD	Department for Work and Pensions (Earlsway)	non-geographic
NE98	NEWCASTLE UPON TYNE	Department for Work and Pensions (Central Office)	non-geographic
NE99	NEWCASTLE UPON TYNE	Locked boxes (Head Post Office)	non-geographic

== Map ==
NE postcode area map, showing postcode districts in red and post towns in grey text, with links to nearby CA, DH, DL, SR and TD postcode areas.

Detailed map of postcode districts and post towns in and around Newcastle upon Tyne

== See also ==
- Postcode Address File
- List of postcode areas in the United Kingdom
