= St Michael's Church, Elswick =

Catholic church in Newcastle upon Tyne, England

Coordinates: 54.9657°N 1.6400°W

St Michael's R.C. Church
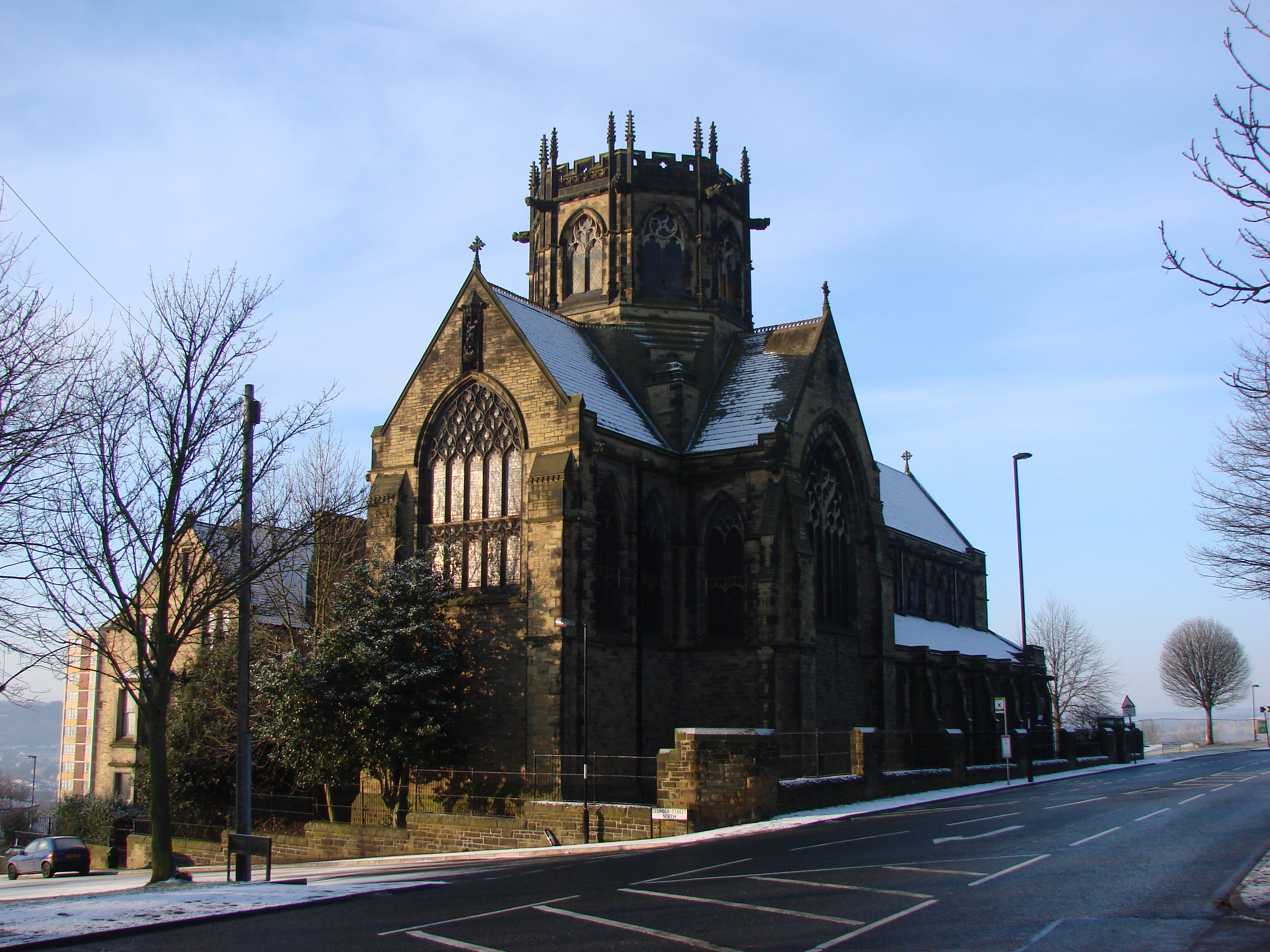
- St Michael's Church in 2010

General information
- Location: Elswick, Newcastle upon Tyne, Tyne and Wear, England
- Construction started: 1871
- Completed: 1891

Listed Building – Grade II*
- Official name: Church of St Michael and Presbytery Attached
- Designated: 17 December 1971
- Reference no.: 1024743

Listed Building – Grade II
- Official name: Walls, Gate Piers, Gates and Railngs Around Church and Presbytery of St Michael
- Designated: 30 March 1987
- Reference no.: 1338571

St Michael's Church is a Grade II* listed Catholic church located in Elswick, Newcastle upon Tyne, in Tyne and Wear.

== Overview ==
St Michael's Church is a church on Westmorland Road, Elswick that historically fell in Northumberland until 1974, when it became part of Tyne and Wear. It falls in the Diocese of Hexham and Newcastle.

== History ==
Construction of the church began in 1871, with stone being laid on 11 June 1889. The church was completed in 1891. Consecration occurred on 24 October 1891.

St Michael's Church and its presbytery was Grade II* listed on 17 December 1971, and the walls, railings, and gates Grade II listed on 30 March 1987.

== See also ==
- St Stephen's Church, Elswick
