= 2026 Newcastle City Council election =

2026 English local government election

- 7 May 2026

All 78 seats to Newcastle City Council 40 seats needed for a majority
- Registered: 191,201
- Turnout: 85,703 (44.8%)
	First party	Second party	Third party
Leader	Colin Ferguson	Nick Hartley	Steven Rutherford
Party	Liberal Democrats	Green	Reform
Leader's seat	Gosforth	Byker	Denton & Westerhope
Last election	23 seats, 24.8%	2 seats, 14.3%	Did not stand
Seats before	22	4	0
Seats won	25	24	24
Seat change	▲3	▲20	▲24
Popular vote	56,238	65,742	58,937
Percentage	23.1%	27.0%	24.2%
Swing	▼1.7pp	▲12.7pp	N/A
	Fourth party	Fifth party	Sixth party
Leader	Marion Williams (Note: Leader of the East End & Associates Independent Group.) (defeated)	Karen Kilgour (defeated)	Doc Anand (defeated)
Party	Independent	Labour	Conservative
Leader's seat	Blakelaw & Cowgate	Blakelaw & Cowgate	Gosforth
Last election	4 seats, 6.5%	45 seats, 40.6%	1 seat, 10.5%
Seats before	12 (Note: Of the 12 independent councillors before the election, six sat in the East End & Associates Independent Group and six were non-aligned. The three Newcastle Independents are shown separately in the results table.)	36 (Note: Includes the vacant seats in South Jesmond and Walkergate, both last held by Labour.)	1
Seats won	3	2	0
Seat change	▼9	▼34	▼1
Popular vote	8,266	43,426	9,120
Percentage	3.4%	17.8%	3.7%
Swing	▼3.1pp	▼22.8pp	▼6.8pp
Leader before election
Karen Kilgour
Labour
No overall control (Note: Labour minority.)
Leader after election
Colin Ferguson
Liberal Democrats
No overall control (Note: Liberal Democrat minority.)

The 2026 Newcastle City Council election was held on 7 May 2026 to elect all 78 members of Newcastle City Council. It was held alongside other local elections across Great Britain. This was the first election held under new ward boundaries, with each of the council's 26 wards electing three councillors.

Prior to the election, the council was under no overall control. Labour was the largest party, and ran the council as a minority administration. At this election, the council remained under no overall control. Labour fell to just two seats, and the incumbent Labour leader of the council, Karen Kilgour, lost her seat. The Liberal Democrats emerged as the largest party with 25 seats, closely followed by the Green Party and Reform UK which won 24 seats each.

After the election, the Liberal Democrats and Green Party agreed a deal which allowed for the formation of a Liberal Democrat minority administration with informal support from the Greens. The Liberal Democrat group leader, Colin Ferguson, was appointed as the new leader of the council at the subsequent annual council meeting on 27 May 2026.

== Background ==
At the previous council election in 2024, Labour had won a majority of the seats. The council subsequently went under no overall control in November 2024 when a number of Labour councillors left the party. Labour remained the largest party and continued to run the council as a minority administration. The Liberal Democrats remained the largest opposition.

In August 2025, Jamie Driscoll, former Mayor of the North of Tyne and former Newcastle City Council member, announced he was standing in the election in Monument ward. He said that a progressive alliance of Majority, the Green Party, and independents could win control of Newcastle City Council. In December 2025, Driscoll joined the Green Party.

== Previous council composition ==
After 2024 election		Before 2026 election	
Party	Seats	Party	Seats
Labour	45	Labour	34
Liberal Democrats	23	Liberal Democrats	22
Green	2	Green	4
Newcastle Ind.	3	Newcastle Ind.	3
Conservative	1	Conservative	1
Independent	4	Independent	12 (Note: Includes East End and Associates Independent Group)
Vacant	0	Vacant	2

== Election result ==
Council composition after the 2024 election

Council composition after the 2026 election

2026 Newcastle City Council election
Party	Candidates	Seats	Gains	Losses	Net gain/loss	Seats %	Votes %	Votes	+/−
Liberal Democrats	78	25	N/A	N/A	▲3	32.1	23.1	56,238	–1.7
Green	78	24	N/A	N/A	▲20	30.8	27.0	65,742	+12.7
Reform	78	24	N/A	N/A	▲24	30.8	24.2	58,937	N/A
Independent	9	3	N/A	N/A	▼9	3.9	3.4	8,266	–3.1
Labour	78	2	N/A	N/A	▼34	2.6	17.8	43,426	–22.8
Conservative	35	0	N/A	N/A	▼1	0.0	3.7	9,120	–6.8
Newcastle Ind.	2	0	N/A	N/A	▼3	0.0	0.6	1,453	–2.2
TUSC	2	0	N/A	N/A	Steady	0.0	<0.1	80	–0.1
Party of Women	1	0	N/A	N/A	Steady	0.0	<0.1	75	N/A
Imagine	1	0	N/A	N/A	Steady	0.0	<0.1	51	N/A
Communist	1	0	N/A	N/A	Steady	0.0	<0.1	50	–0.1

== Aftermath ==
The election left the council under no overall control. On 26 May, Liberal Democrat group leader Colin Ferguson and Green group leader Nick Hartley signed a memorandum of understanding under which the two groups agreed to work together, while stopping short of a formal coalition. The following day, the council appointed Ferguson as leader of a Liberal Democrat minority administration.

== Ward results ==
=== Arthur's Hill ===
Arthur's Hill (3 seats)
Party	Candidate	Votes	%	±%
Green	John Pearson	1,314	50.7	+37.0
Green	Rowshon Uddin	1,311	50.6	+36.9
Green	Mohammed Suleman	1,220	47.1	+33.4
Labour	Hannah Cousins	788	30.4	−20.1
Labour	Hayder Qureshi	686	26.5	−24.0
Labour	Joanne Kingsland	685	26.4	−24.1
Reform	Gareth Barber	375	14.5	N/A
Reform	Clifford Hedley	356	13.7	N/A
Reform	Stuart Norton	347	13.4	N/A
Liberal Democrats	Mohammed Milon	165	6.4	+2.0
Liberal Democrats	Abigail MacDonald	161	6.2	+1.8
Conservative	Margaret Birkmyre	130	5.0	−2.0
Independent	Joseph Eldridge	91	3.5	N/A
Liberal Democrats	Adrin Neatrour	85	3.3	−1.1
Imagine	Shemol Rahman	51	2.0	N/A
Turnout		2,749	36.5	+6.4
Registered electors		7,523		
Green gain from Labour				
Green gain from Labour				
Green gain from Labour				

=== Benwell, Scotswood & Denton Burn ===
Benwell, Scotswood & Denton Burn (3 seats)
Party	Candidate	Votes	%
Reform	David Minto	954	40.7
Reform	Daniel Astley	906	38.7
Reform	Jiabao He	792	33.8
Labour	Robert Higgins*	726	31.0
Labour	Hazel Stephenson*	688	29.4
Labour	Susan Anthony*	615	26.2
Green	Jan Grace	481	20.5
Green	Rima Hussein	416	17.8
Independent	David McGovern	402	17.2
Green	Kerrin Tatwood	388	16.6
Conservative	Anthony Brown	193	8.2
Liberal Democrats	Gavin Liddle	173	7.4
Liberal Democrats	Hans Andersen	162	6.9
Liberal Democrats	Robin Brooke	129	5.5
Turnout		2,605	40.4
Registered electors		6,446	
Reform win (new seat)			
Reform win (new seat)			
Reform win (new seat)			

=== Blakelaw & Cowgate ===
Blakelaw & Cowgate (3 seats)
Party	Candidate	Votes	%
Reform	Rachel Davison	885	39.4
Reform	Gavin Hutchinson	857	38.2
Reform	Irene Turnbull	834	37.1
Labour	Juna Sathian*	812	36.2
Labour	Karen Kilgour	681	30.3
Labour	Ian Tokell	579	25.8
Green	Aurora Harrison	457	20.4
Green	Tina Ion	453	20.2
Green	Frances Hinton	418	18.6
Liberal Democrats	Brian McGreevy	169	7.5
Conservative	Dawn Brown	165	7.3
Liberal Democrats	Lauren Proctor	140	6.2
Liberal Democrats	Bill Schardt	135	6.0
Independent	Marion Williams*	114	5.1
TUSC	Michael O'Dowd	35	1.6
Turnout		2,415	34.2
Registered electors		7,065	
Reform win (new seat)			
Reform win (new seat)			
Reform win (new seat)			

=== Byker ===
Byker (3 seats)
Party	Candidate	Votes	%	±%
Green	Nick Hartley*	1,567	63.2	+6.4
Green	Jamie Anderson	1,491	60.1	+3.3
Green	Hedley Sugar-Wells	1,402	56.5	−0.3
Reform	Tanya Dawes	630	25.4	N/A
Reform	Shane Robinson	599	24.2	N/A
Reform	Neil Scott	565	22.8	N/A
Labour	Gavin Jordan	312	12.6	−23.0
Labour	Khadija Ali	310	12.5	−23.1
Labour	Will Wain	256	10.3	−25.3
Liberal Democrats	Steven Forster	89	3.6	+1.1
Conservative	Syed Ahmed	84	3.4	−3.4
Liberal Democrats	Gary Day	70	2.8	+0.3
Liberal Democrats	Robert Jarman	54	2.2	−0.3
Turnout		2,643	35.8	+2.7
Registered electors		7,388		
Green hold				
Green gain from Independent				
Green gain from Labour				

=== Castle ===
Castle (3 seats)
Party	Candidate	Votes	%	±%
Green	Jamie Robinson	1,228	39.4	+30.0
Liberal Democrats	David Down	1,109	35.6	−2.3
Green	Imran Mohammed	1,054	33.8	+24.4
Liberal Democrats	Dhananjay Singh	1,037	33.3	−4.6
Liberal Democrats	Richard Morris	975	31.3	−6.6
Green	Andrew Welch	936	30.0	+20.6
Reform	Samuel Bennett	657	21.1	N/A
Reform	Roderick Russell	591	19.0	N/A
Reform	Gary Black	565	18.1	N/A
Labour	Andrew Herridge*	380	12.2	−28.1
Labour	Steve Fairlie	311	10.0	−30.3
Labour	Mark Edwards-Junior	308	9.9	−30.4
Conservative	Anna Wilson	195	6.3	−6.1
Turnout		3,264	43.6	+10.6
Registered electors		7,489		
Green gain from Independent				
Liberal Democrats hold				
Green gain from Labour				

=== Chapel ===
Chapel (3 seats)
Party	Candidate	Votes	%	±%
Independent	Marc Donnelly*	2,918	76.5	+6.0
Independent	Margaret Donnelly*	2,462	64.5	−6.0
Independent	Lawrence Hunter*	1,903	49.9	−20.6
Reform	Yvonne Alden	1,108	29.0	N/A
Reform	Chanchal Samaiya	676	17.7	N/A
Reform	Prashasti Khare	650	17.0	N/A
Labour	David Cook	272	7.1	−10.2
Labour	Owen Bell	242	6.3	−11.0
Green	Mary Clifford	233	6.1	+3.9
Labour	Ben Hobson	213	5.6	−11.7
Green	Keith Metcalf	157	4.1	+1.9
Green	James Price	140	3.7	+1.5
Conservative	Karen Jewers	137	3.6	−3.5
Conservative	Muhammad Dahri	100	2.6	−4.5
Liberal Democrats	Ian Cowans	99	2.6	−0.3
Liberal Democrats	Judith Steen	69	1.8	−1.1
Liberal Democrats	David Slesenger	67	1.8	−1.1
Turnout		4,067	55.6	+10.6
Registered electors		7,312		
Independent hold				
Independent hold				
Independent hold				

=== Dene & South Gosforth ===
Dene & South Gosforth (3 seats)
Party	Candidate	Votes	%	±%
Liberal Democrats	Wendy Taylor*	2,141	50.4	+4.2
Liberal Democrats	Henry Gallagher*	1,955	46.0	−0.2
Liberal Democrats	Stephen Psallidas	1,886	44.4	−1.8
Green	Nick Simpson	1,064	25.0	+11.1
Green	James Brine	1,050	24.7	+10.8
Green	Laurence Taylor	961	22.6	+8.7
Labour	Hilary Franks	692	16.3	−15.8
Labour	Alex Dodgson	638	15.0	−17.1
Labour	Marley Nellis	609	14.3	−17.8
Reform	David Cooper	540	12.7	N/A
Reform	Adam Forrest	515	12.1	N/A
Reform	Peter Laws	495	11.7	N/A
Conservative	Gerry Langley	194	4.6	−3.2
Turnout		4,410	58.6	+8.7
Registered electors		7,522		
Liberal Democrats hold				
Liberal Democrats hold				
Liberal Democrats hold				

=== Denton & Westerhope ===
Denton & Westerhope (3 seats)
Party	Candidate	Votes	%	±%
Reform	Margaret Bebb	1,231	46.9	N/A
Reform	Steven Rutherford	1,198	45.6	N/A
Reform	Kami Kundi	1,009	38.4	N/A
Newcastle Ind.	Tracey Mitchell*	776	29.6	−16.1
Newcastle Ind.	Adam Mitchell*	677	25.8	−19.9
Labour	Vince Barry-Stanners	509	19.4	−21.8
Labour	Zarah St Clair	501	19.1	−22.1
Labour	Emmanuel Alawode	483	18.4	−22.8
Liberal Democrats	Colin Daglish	293	11.2	+8.0
Green	Miles Henderson	290	11.0	+7.2
Green	Ben Feechan	276	10.5	+6.7
Green	Roger Whittaker	245	9.3	+5.5
Conservative	Alan Birkmyre	150	5.7	−0.5
Liberal Democrats	Elizabeth Dicken	131	5.0	+1.8
Liberal Democrats	Jacqueline Slesenger	106	4.0	+0.8
Turnout		2,893	36.5	+4.8
Registered electors		7,919		
Reform gain from Newcastle Ind.				
Reform gain from Newcastle Ind.				
Reform gain from Labour				

=== Elswick ===
Elswick (3 seats)
Party	Candidate	Votes	%	±%
Green	Halimah Begum	1,302	51.3	+5.9
Green	Khaled Musharraf*	1,239	48.8	+3.4
Green	Peter Thomson	1,135	44.7	−0.7
Reform	Hazel Dixon	634	25.0	N/A
Reform	Timothy Smith	618	24.3	N/A
Labour	Arif Zaman	575	22.6	−18.7
Reform	Philip Tolan	574	22.6	N/A
Labour	Margaret Murning	555	21.9	−19.4
Labour	Nicu Ion	494	19.5	−21.8
Liberal Democrats	Jeremy Bell	130	5.1	+0.6
Liberal Democrats	Margaret Dooner	126	5.0	+0.5
Liberal Democrats	David Faulkner	123	4.8	+0.3
Conservative	Mohammed Habibi	106	4.2	−4.6
Turnout		2,710	36.1	+2.2
Registered electors		7,511		
Green gain from Independent				
Green hold				
Green gain from Labour				

=== Fawdon & West Gosforth ===
Fawdon & West Gosforth (3 seats)
Party	Candidate	Votes	%	±%
Liberal Democrats	Peter Lovatt*	1,854	49.6	−5.6
Liberal Democrats	Rob Austin*	1,823	48.8	−6.4
Liberal Democrats	John Hall*	1,796	48.0	−7.2
Reform	John Duffy	808	21.6	N/A
Reform	Martin Evison	768	20.5	N/A
Reform	Kai Hoult	693	18.5	N/A
Green	Daniel Jones	604	16.2	+2.6
Green	Isabella Warburton-Brown	598	16.0	+2.4
Green	David Laws	587	15.7	+2.1
Labour	Arlene Ainsley	571	15.3	−8.2
Labour	Callum Buchanan	484	12.9	−10.6
Labour	Gary Kilgour	434	11.6	−11.9
Conservative	Milo Bennett	188	5.0	−2.7
Turnout		3,930	47.8	+12.4
Registered electors		8,224		
Liberal Democrats hold				
Liberal Democrats hold				
Liberal Democrats hold				

=== Gosforth ===
Gosforth (3 seats)
Party	Candidate	Votes	%	±%
Liberal Democrats	Colin Ferguson*	2,181	46.5	+15.5
Liberal Democrats	Tahir Siddique	1,980	42.2	+11.2
Liberal Democrats	Thomas Woodwark*	1,904	40.6	+9.6
Conservative	Doc Anand*	1,638	34.9	+1.2
Conservative	Rebecca Mead	1,066	22.7	−11.0
Conservative	Maria Manco	1,040	22.2	−11.5
Green	Adam Jackson	646	13.8	+5.4
Green	Jack Burton	593	12.6	+4.2
Labour	Thomas Millen	517	11.0	−11.9
Green	Andrew Kidger	480	10.2	+1.8
Labour	Jonathan Sabarre	471	10.0	−12.9
Labour	Colin Wright	459	9.8	−13.1
Reform	John Dale	409	8.7	N/A
Reform	George Ford	368	7.8	N/A
Reform	Alistair Pedlow	324	6.9	N/A
Turnout		4,871	60.0	+6.2
Registered electors		8,120		
Liberal Democrats hold				
Liberal Democrats gain from Conservative				
Liberal Democrats hold				

=== Heaton ===
Heaton (3 seats)
Party	Candidate	Votes	%	±%
Green	Chandni Chopra	2,329	54.8	+35.4
Green	Andrew Gray	2,305	54.2	+34.8
Green	Joe Gartland	2,266	53.3	+33.9
Liberal Democrats	Mark Ridyard	950	22.4	+8.1
Labour	Lara Ellis*	872	20.5	−24.0
Labour	Clare Penny-Evans*	770	18.1	−26.4
Liberal Democrats	Jude Browne	768	18.1	+3.8
Liberal Democrats	Andrew Rakowski	706	16.6	+2.3
Labour	Mehrban Sadiq*	636	15.0	−29.5
Reform	Billy Hill	339	8.0	N/A
Reform	Stewart Jackson	332	7.8	N/A
Reform	Steve Taylor	316	7.4	N/A
Conservative	John Dobie	102	2.4	−2.3
Communist	Steve Handford	50	1.2	−0.8
Turnout		4,433	58.7	+12.5
Registered electors		7,554		
Green gain from Labour				
Green gain from Labour				
Green gain from Labour				

=== Jesmond ===
Jesmond (3 seats)
Party	Candidate	Votes	%
Liberal Democrats	Philip Browne*	1,570	46.0
Liberal Democrats	James Coles*	1,527	44.7
Liberal Democrats	Peter Allen*	1,451	42.5
Green	Marianne Kell	1,147	33.6
Green	Tim Dowson	1,083	31.7
Green	Ludovico Rella	1,001	29.3
Labour	Killian McCartney	494	14.5
Labour	Fin Weatherill	435	12.7
Labour	John White	420	12.3
Reform	Trevor Cox	316	9.3
Reform	Ellen Russell	316	9.3
Reform	Janet Stansfield	307	9.0
Conservative	Sandra Davison	169	5.0
Turnout		3,491	50.2
Registered electors		6,960	
Liberal Democrats win (new seat)			
Liberal Democrats win (new seat)			
Liberal Democrats win (new seat)			

=== Kenton ===
Kenton (3 seats)
Party	Candidate	Votes	%	±%
Labour	Stephen Lambert*	1,051	36.2	−29.1
Labour	Ged Bell*	1,010	34.8	−30.5
Reform	Mick Mahoney	978	33.7	N/A
Reform	Terry McNamara	923	31.8	N/A
Reform	Alison Sanderson	913	31.5	N/A
Labour	Paula Maines*	901	31.1	−34.2
Green	Jane Lancaster	600	20.7	+9.8
Green	Richard Frearson	589	20.3	+9.4
Green	Milan Nemecek	541	18.7	+7.8
Liberal Democrats	Craig Austin	385	13.3	+0.1
Liberal Democrats	Ronald Clark	288	9.9	−3.3
Liberal Democrats	Philip McArdle	273	9.4	−3.8
Conservative	Gareth Davies	199	6.9	−0.7
TUSC	Nick Fray	45	1.6	−1.5
Turnout		3,087	41.5	+7.3
Registered electors		7,434		
Labour hold				
Labour hold				
Reform gain from Labour				

=== Kingston Park & Dinnington ===
Kingston Park & Dinnington (3 seats)
Party	Candidate	Votes	%
Liberal Democrats	Barbara Down	1,643	43.6
Liberal Democrats	John Mansfield	1,587	42.1
Liberal Democrats	Mohammad Farsi	1,552	41.2
Reform	Chris Durham	1,034	27.4
Reform	Gordon Forbes	1,005	26.7
Reform	Frank Wilson	949	25.2
Labour	Simon Harrison	534	14.2
Labour	Liam Spencer	514	13.6
Labour	Gordana Vasic-Franklin	471	12.5
Green	Katy Sawyer	443	11.8
Green	Susie Warburton-Brown	416	11.0
Green	Dave Webb	350	9.3
Conservative	Connor Shotton	289	7.7
Conservative	Kenneth Wake	262	7.0
Conservative	Tudor Skelly	254	6.7
Turnout		3,884	51.8
Registered electors		7,500	
Liberal Democrats win (new seat)			
Liberal Democrats win (new seat)			
Liberal Democrats win (new seat)			

=== Lemington ===
Lemington (3 seats)
Party	Candidate	Votes	%	±%
Reform	Kirsty Galbraith	1,361	50.6	N/A
Reform	Adrian Butler	1,352	50.3	N/A
Reform	Russ Lawler	1,307	48.6	N/A
Labour	Barry Phillipson*	817	30.4	−14.7
Labour	Stephen Barry-Stanners*	703	26.1	−19.0
Labour	Eleanor Woolstencroft	609	22.6	−22.5
Green	David Harrison	386	14.4	+9.1
Green	Alice Kubiak	349	13.0	+7.7
Green	Peter Mitchell	321	11.9	+6.6
Liberal Democrats	Tracy Connell	261	9.7	+4.3
Liberal Democrats	Barbara Moorhead	223	8.3	+2.9
Liberal Democrats	Bill Shepherd	188	7.0	+1.6
Conservative	Ian Davison	180	6.7	−2.0
Turnout		2,896	40.7	+9.0
Registered electors		7,120		
Reform gain from Labour				
Reform gain from Independent				
Reform gain from Labour				

=== Manor Park ===
Manor Park (3 seats)
Party	Candidate	Votes	%	±%
Liberal Democrats	Greg Stone*	1,691	48.7	−7.7
Liberal Democrats	Doreen Huddart*	1,654	47.6	−8.8
Liberal Democrats	Deborah Burns*	1,616	46.5	−9.9
Green	Philip Brookes	780	22.5	+9.9
Green	Nathan Evans	757	21.8	+9.2
Green	Mica Hind	697	20.1	+7.5
Reform	Trevor Cox	619	17.8	N/A
Reform	John Gardner	599	17.3	N/A
Reform	Mark Gardner	564	16.2	N/A
Labour	Christopher Bartlett	515	14.8	−11.2
Labour	Danny Hutton-Ferris	396	11.4	−14.6
Labour	Christopher O'Keeffe	360	10.4	−15.6
Conservative	Heather Chambers	158	4.6	−0.4
Turnout		3,675	52.1	+6.8
Registered electors		7,051		
Liberal Democrats hold				
Liberal Democrats hold				
Liberal Democrats hold				

=== Monument ===
Monument (3 seats)
Party	Candidate	Votes	%	±%
Green	Jamie Driscoll	1,100	54.4	+30.1
Green	Gareth Jones	1,015	50.2	+25.9
Green	Kiran Sayyed	959	47.4	+23.1
Labour	Nabeela Ali*	528	26.1	−30.8
Labour	Raja Khan	403	19.9	−37.0
Labour	Mirza Yousaf	388	19.2	−37.7
Reform	Christopher Gray	343	17.0	N/A
Reform	Paul Wallace	323	16.0	N/A
Reform	Agnes Offiong	318	15.7	N/A
Liberal Democrats	Alison Murphy	142	7.0	−1.8
Liberal Democrats	Aidan King	137	6.8	−2.0
Liberal Democrats	Brian Hall	125	6.2	−2.6
Independent	Craig Cottrell	101	5.0	N/A
Conservative	John Honeychurch-Kyle	88	4.4	−5.6
Conservative	Chaudhry Ahmad	85	4.2	−5.8
Turnout		2,087	32.4	+5.5
Registered electors		6,449		
Green gain from Labour				
Green gain from Independent				
Green gain from Labour				

=== Newbiggin Hall & Callerton ===
Newbiggin Hall & Callerton (3 seats)
Party	Candidate	Votes	%
Reform	Brian Moore	1,257	46.3
Reform	Deanne Bell	1,238	45.6
Reform	Colin Nichol	1,216	44.8
Labour	George Pattison*	887	32.7
Labour	Alexander Hay*	816	30.1
Labour	Jacqui Robinson*	802	29.6
Green	Anne Tindale	402	14.8
Green	Rory Osborne	380	14.0
Green	Angus Williams	347	12.8
Liberal Democrats	Helen Laverick	235	8.7
Conservative	James Setch	217	8.0
Liberal Democrats	Ali Avaei	180	6.6
Liberal Democrats	Andrew Swai	156	5.8
Turnout		2,909	34.7
Registered electors		8,387	
Reform win (new seat)			
Reform win (new seat)			
Reform win (new seat)			

=== Ouseburn ===
Ouseburn (3 seats)
Party	Candidate	Votes	%	±%
Green	Alistair Chisholm*	2,066	61.6	+47.0
Green	Sarah Peters	2,026	60.4	+45.8
Green	Lawrence Davies	1,896	56.5	+41.9
Liberal Democrats	Gareth Kane*	884	26.4	−8.6
Liberal Democrats	Mike Cookson*	815	24.3	−10.7
Liberal Democrats	Matt Osbourn	681	20.3	−14.7
Reform	Leon Brown	314	9.4	N/A
Reform	Curtis Hollocks	280	8.3	N/A
Labour	Robert Fleming	277	8.3	−40.1
Reform	Tony Teasdale	250	7.5	N/A
Labour	Ali Mehmood	244	7.3	−41.1
Labour	Joseph Morris	220	6.6	−41.8
Conservative	Marie Summersby	54	1.6	−0.4
Conservative	Philip Parkinson	45	1.3	−0.7
Turnout		3,457	48.4	+8.1
Registered electors		7,142		
Green hold				
Green gain from Liberal Democrats				
Green gain from Liberal Democrats				

=== Parklands & North Gosforth ===
Parklands & North Gosforth (3 seats)
Party	Candidate	Votes	%
Liberal Democrats	Pauline Allen*	2,174	56.7
Liberal Democrats	Christine Morrissey*	1,982	51.7
Liberal Democrats	David Partington	1,966	51.3
Green	Audrey MacNaughton	763	19.9
Reform	Paul Barrett	670	17.5
Green	Andrew Capocci	628	16.4
Reform	Gerard Bartley	615	16.0
Reform	Alex Clark	613	16.0
Green	Will Rogers	581	15.2
Labour	Benjamin Eckford	393	10.3
Labour	Lewys Evans	382	10.0
Labour	William Kilgour	367	9.6
Conservative	Alison Wake	363	9.5
Turnout		4,009	54.5
Registered electors		7,354	
Liberal Democrats win (new seat)			
Liberal Democrats win (new seat)			
Liberal Democrats win (new seat)			

=== Throckley, Walbottle & Newburn ===
Throckley, Walbottle & Newburn (3 seats)
Party	Candidate	Votes	%
Reform	Richard Barnes	1,380	45.8
Reform	Michael Fitzpatrick	1,335	44.3
Reform	Amy Hunter	1,297	43.0
Labour	Linda Wright*	914	30.3
Labour	Adam Walker*	851	28.2
Labour	Mark Hardy	837	27.8
Green	Kimberley Barrass	432	14.3
Green	Idwal John	417	13.8
Green	Pat McGee	375	12.4
Conservative	Harry Drew	276	9.2
Conservative	Simon Bell	266	8.8
Conservative	Alexis Fernandes	244	8.1
Liberal Democrats	Belinda Brady	150	5.0
Liberal Democrats	Angela Hall	133	4.4
Liberal Democrats	Christine Cogan	124	4.1
Turnout		3,126	44.8
Registered electors		6,982	
Reform win (new seat)			
Reform win (new seat)			
Reform win (new seat)			

=== Walker ===
Walker (3 seats)
Party	Candidate	Votes	%	±%
Green	Matt Williams	1,068	42.8	+33.4
Reform	Colin Goldsborough	1,052	42.1	N/A
Reform	Lorraine Gingell	1,036	41.5	N/A
Green	Chuck Taylor	972	38.9	+29.5
Reform	Richard Sharp	968	38.8	N/A
Green	Tom Whatson	943	37.8	+28.4
Labour	Ian Aird	325	13.0	−56.8
Labour	Pamela Victor-Ibitamuno	263	10.5	−59.3
Labour	Sam Vosper	251	10.1	−59.7
Independent	John Stokel-Walker*	161	6.4	N/A
Independent	Davy Wood*	114	4.6	N/A
Party of Women	Liz Panton	75	3.0	N/A
Conservative	Christopher Metcalf	69	2.8	−10.1
Liberal Democrats	Mark Buckley	64	2.6	−5.3
Liberal Democrats	Robert Renton	64	2.6	−5.3
Liberal Democrats	Andrew Cowie	57	2.3	−5.6
Turnout		2,679	35.6	+10.1
Registered electors		7,532		
Green gain from Independent				
Reform gain from Independent				
Reform gain from Independent				

=== Walkergate ===
Walkergate (3 seats)
Party	Candidate	Votes	%	±%
Reform	Stephen Lowrey	1,514	50.5	N/A
Reform	Gavin Maw	1,430	47.7	N/A
Reform	David Orr	1,424	47.5	N/A
Labour	Christine Aird	724	24.1	−34.5
Labour	Brad Aird	690	23.0	−35.6
Green	Margaret Montgomery	653	21.8	+4.4
Green	Maria Maza	544	18.1	+0.7
Labour	Abdul Rajib	541	18.0	−40.6
Green	Wayne Thompson	504	16.8	−0.6
Liberal Democrats	Karen Robinson	310	10.3	−1.7
Liberal Democrats	David Cain	243	8.1	−3.9
Liberal Democrats	William Signey	212	7.1	−4.9
Conservative	Stephen Oxborough	205	6.8	−5.2
Turnout		3,229	43.9	+11.5
Registered electors		7,348		
Reform gain from Labour				
Reform gain from Independent				
Reform gain from Labour				

=== West Fenham ===
West Fenham (3 seats)
Party	Candidate	Votes	%	±%
Liberal Democrats	PJ Morrissey*	1,135	40.2	−6.7
Liberal Democrats	Mark Mitchell*	1,023	36.2	−10.7
Liberal Democrats	Owen Burbidge	1,015	35.9	−11.0
Reform	Barry Brians	937	33.2	N/A
Reform	Michael Martin	905	32.0	N/A
Reform	John Moore	868	30.7	N/A
Green	Tasnim Adnan	521	18.4	+6.5
Green	Lauren Healey	504	17.8	+5.9
Green	Sian Broadhurst	483	17.1	+5.2
Labour	Navya Bharagida	347	12.3	−21.7
Labour	Saeem Korim	329	11.6	−22.4
Labour	Connor Slomski	309	10.9	−23.1
Conservative	Fahim Habibi	85	3.0	−4.2
Turnout		2,983	43.7	+7.2
Registered electors		6,827		
Liberal Democrats hold				
Liberal Democrats hold				
Liberal Democrats gain from Labour				

=== Wingrove ===
Wingrove (3 seats)
Party	Candidate	Votes	%	±%
Green	Humaira Khan	1,434	47.5	+32.2
Green	Younes Mohammed	1,367	45.3	+30.0
Green	Mohammed Sarwar	1,266	42.0	+26.7
Labour	Irim Ali*	1,076	35.7	−3.8
Labour	Joyce McCarty*	990	32.8	−6.7
Labour	Rebecca Shatwell*	908	30.1	−9.4
Reform	Harold Goodwill	447	14.8	N/A
Reform	James Lee	429	14.2	N/A
Reform	John Ekong	417	13.8	N/A
Liberal Democrats	Fi Clarke	219	7.3	+1.0
Liberal Democrats	Colin Steen	199	6.6	+0.3
Liberal Democrats	Babatope Aguntasolo	163	5.4	−0.9
Conservative	Mo Karim	124	4.1	−3.2
Turnout		3,201	45.5	+3.9
Registered electors		7,042		
Green gain from Labour				
Green gain from Labour				
Green gain from Labour				

== Changes 2026–2027 ==
- May 2026: Mohammed Suleman, who had been elected in Arthur's Hill with the Green Party description on the ballot paper, took his seat as an independent after the party withdrew its endorsement before polling day.
- July 2026: The resignation of Amy Hunter reduced both Reform UK and the Green Party to 23 sitting councillors each and created a vacancy in Throckley, Walbottle & Newburn.

=== Throckley, Walbottle & Newburn by-election ===
The Throckley, Walbottle & Newburn by-election was triggered by Amy Hunter's resignation, which she attributed to changes to her health, personal circumstances and work commitments.

Throckley, Walbottle & Newburn by-election, 27 August 2026
Party	Candidate	Votes	%	±%
Reform	Martin Evison	901	39.0	−4.8
Liberal Democrats	Stephen Kelly	670	29.0	+24.3
Labour	Linda Wright	534	23.1	−5.9
Green	Kimberley Barrass	103	4.5	−9.2
Conservative	Alexis Fernandes	101	4.4	−4.4
Majority		231	10.0	N/A
Turnout		2309	32.9	−11.9
Reform hold		Swing		
