= Majority (organisation) =

- Leader: Jamie Driscoll
- Founder: Jamie Driscoll
- Founded: July 2024
- Membership (2025): ~1,000
- Political position: Left-wing

Website
- majorityuk.org

Majority is a left-wing political organisation and former political party in the United Kingdom founded in 2024 by supporters of Jamie Driscoll, which has been described as a movement for a progressive alliance.

As a non-party organization it consists of members who are also members of other political parties; it has endorsed and supported independent candidates and Green Party candidates in local elections. Majority has previously been a registered political party with the Electoral Commission so that it could run candidates in elections under the Majority label.

== History ==
Majority was founded in 2024 by people who had campaigned for Jamie Driscoll in the 2024 North East mayoral election. Driscoll called on Labour Party members to leave the party, and to join Majority. On 16 December 2024, Driscoll registered a legally separate Majority Party with the Electoral Commission to field candidates across Great Britain.

In the 2025 United Kingdom local elections, Majority stood one candidate as "Majority Northumberland Independents" in the Rothbury ward of Northumberland County Council. With the candidate came fifth out of eight candidates.

In the 2025 Longbenton and Benton ward by-election, Majority as well as North Tyneside Community Independents endorsed the Green Party candidate Jim Howard who finished in third of five candidates.

In the 2025 South Jesmond ward by-election, Majority endorsed the Green Party candidate Sarah Peters who won the election.

In August 2025, Jamie Driscoll announced he was standing 2026 Newcastle City Council election in Monument ward, and said that a progressive alliance of Majority, the Green Party and independents could win control of Newcastle City Council. Driscoll also announced that Majority had almost 1,000 due-paying members.

In September 2025, Majority hosted a conference with Zarah Sultana, discussing the prospects of a potential new left-wing party. Approximately 330 attended. Driscoll and Sultana both said how Majority's relationship with a new party would be up to Majority's own membership.

In December 2025, Driscoll announced he had joined the Green Party. He claimed "there’s lots of Majority members who are already members of the Greens", and stated that Majority will continue its role as a "social movement".

== Platform and support ==
The organisation is left-wing, with anti-racist and pro-public ownership values.

As an organisation supporting a progressive alliance, Majority has backed Green and independent candidates, as well as progressive Labour candidates who agree to support Majority's platform and operate under the Nolan Principles.

Majority has held people's assemblies to as part of their policy process.

== See also ==
- Political parties in the United Kingdom
- British left
- Compass
