= Denton, Newcastle upon Tyne =

Coordinates: 54.996°N 1.715°W

Denton
- Ward
- Location within the United Kingdom
- OS grid reference: NZ183668
- Ceremonial county: Tyne and Wear
- Country: England
- Sovereign state: United Kingdom
- UK Parliament: Newcastle upon Tyne Central and West

Denton is an electoral ward of Newcastle upon Tyne in North East England. The ward encompasses the Chapel House and West Denton housing areas. The population the ward was 10,500 at the 2011 Census, 4.2% of the total population of Newcastle upon Tyne. Car ownership in the area is 56.6%, slightly higher than the city average of 54.7%.

== Education ==
There are six schools within the ward Beech Hill Primary, Studio West, West Denton Primary, St John Vianney RC Primary, Thomas Bewick Special School, and the Linhope Pupil Referral Unit.

== Leisure ==
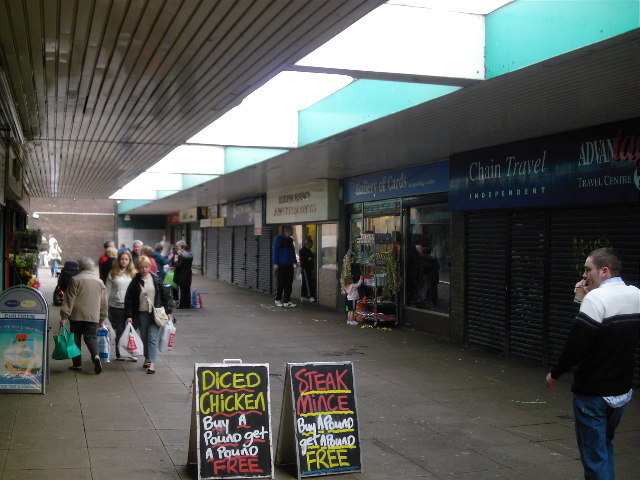
The now rebuilt Denton Park Shopping Centre

This ward has many green and open spaces at All Saints College, Denton Dene, West Denton Community Centre, Barbondale Lonnen, Talbot Green, and Westerhope Park, as well as other small areas of open space. There are a number of small play areas in the ward.

There is also the Outer West pool and library which under Newcastle City Council reviews in 2012/2013 was considered for closure in 2013, but remained open.

== Ward boundary ==
The boundary starts at the A1/Stamfordham Road roundabout and heads northwest along Stamfordham Road. It heads south along Glantlees, turns west along the rear of Fairspring and moves north excluding the Greenfield Avenue properties. The boundary heads westerly along West Avenue to the junction with Rogerson Terrace. It then turns south and runs along the cycle track to All Saints College. From All Saints, the boundary follows the playing fields to Hillhead Road to the junction with Hillhead Parkway. It incorporates land to the south of Hillhead Parkway. The boundary then heads west to the rear of the church and on to the rear of Frenton Close. It follows the rear of the properties on Clifton Walk until reaching North Walbottle wagonway. It then follows the wagonway south incorporating the Walbottle Year 7 Annexe until reaching the A69 where it heads east until reaching the A1 Western By-pass. From here the boundary heads along the A1 back to the Stamfordham Road roundabout.

== Crime ==
Crime has risen within recent years, in a lot of cases due to the 'West Denton Wild Boys' street gang, consisting of mainly white, Asian and Afro-Caribbean teenagers. In recent years the street gang has been in the local news for the stabbing of a 19-year-old man, and in 2007 the gang was suspected of a murder of the 29-year-old Stephen Stafford, however it was never proven it was the gang. The gang had nothing to do with the original West Denton Wild Bunch who were around during the 70s and 80s and had copied the name. The gang stayed out of the media for a considerably large amount of time, until an online video was uploaded to YouTube showing members of the gang 'brandishing firearms, bearing knives and speeding on motorbikes'.

== Charts and tables ==
Age group	Number
Under 16	1,110
16-24	1,029
25-44	2,863
45-64	2,535
65-74	1,330
75+	984

Ethnicity	Number	%
White and mixed White	10,650	98.3
Afro-Caribbean	27	0.2
South Asian	105	1
Chinese	17	0.2
Other	40	0.4

The ward has 4,798 housing spaces of which 2.7% are vacant this is nearly half of the city average of 5.3%. Owner occupied property stands at 60.8% higher than the city average of 53.3%. The properties are as follows.

Property type	Number	%
Detached	270	5.6
Semi-detached	2,164	45.2
Terraced	1,474	30.8
Flats	884	18.4
Other	0	0
