= St Stephen's Church, Low Elswick =

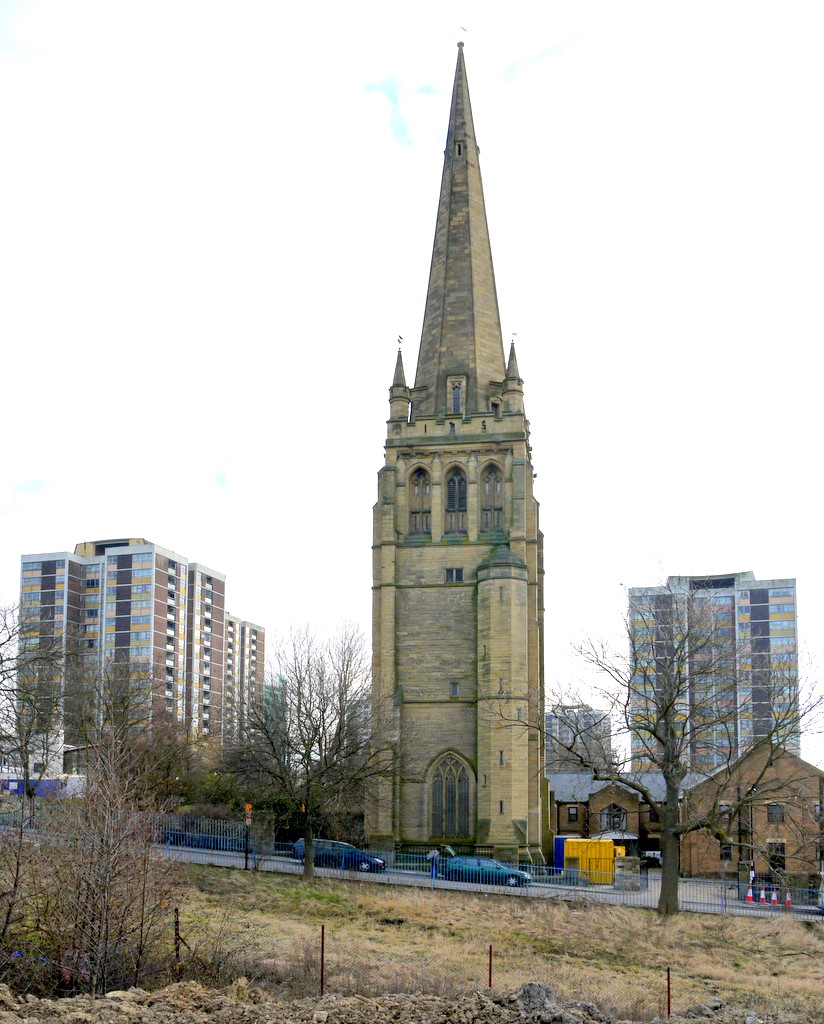
- Tower of St Stephen's Church, Low Elswick
- St Stephen's Church, Low Elswick
- 54.9635°N 1.6401°W
- OS grid reference: NZ 231 632
- Location: Brunel Terrace, Low Elswick, Newcastle
- Country: England
- Denomination: Anglican
- Website: www.visitchurches.org.uk/visit/church-listing/st-stephen-low-elswick.html

History
- Dedication: Saint Stephen

Architecture
- Functional status: Redundant
- Heritage designation: Grade II
- Designated: 14 June 1954
- Architectural type: Church
- Style: Gothic Revival (Decorated)
- Groundbreaking: 1866
- Completed: 1868
- Closed: 1 January 1984

Specifications
- Materials: Sandstone, Welsh slate roof

Listed Building – Grade II
- Official name: Church of St Stephen
- Designated: 14 June 1954
- Reference no.: 1355238

St Stephen's Church is a redundant Anglican church on Brunel Terrace, Low Elswick, Newcastle upon Tyne, England. It is recorded in the National Heritage List for England as a designated Grade II listed building, and is under the care of the Churches Conservation Trust.

== History ==
The foundation stone of the church was laid by Sir William Armstrong on 19 November 1866. Building was completed in 1868 and it was dedicated by Charles Baring, Bishop of Durham, during that year. It was declared redundant on 1 January 1984 and was vested in the Trust on 18 March 1987.

The main part of the church building was found to have been suffering from dry rot and was demolished between 1987 and 1988. Only the tower of the church remains standing. Only the base of the tower is available for public access, by prior appointment.

== Architecture ==
The church is constructed in sandstone with a Welsh slate roof. As built, its plan consisted of a nave with north and south aisles and a west porch, a north transept, a chancel with a north aisle, and a northwest tower. Its architectural style is Decorated Gothic Revival. The tower is in three stages with triple bell openings, a corbel table, and a battlemented parapet. Flying buttresses lead up to a tall octagonal spire with lucarnes. It contains a ring of eight bells which were cast in 1880 by John Taylor of Loughborough.

== See also ==
- List of churches preserved by the Churches Conservation Trust in Northern England
- St Michael's Church, Elswick
