= Harold Elsdon =

English cricketer (1921–1995)

Personal information
- Full name: Harold Elsdon
- Born: 19 February 1921; Lemington, Northumberland, England
- Died: 8 May 1995 (aged 74); Gloucester, Gloucestershire, England
- Nickname: Harry
- Batting: Right-handed
- Bowling: Right-arm fast

Domestic team information
- Years: Team
- 1949: Minor Counties
- 1938–1956: Northumberland

Career statistics
Competition	First-class
Matches	1
Runs scored	12
Batting average	12.00
100s/50s	–/–
Top score	12*
Balls bowled	246
Wickets	3
Bowling average	33.33
5 wickets in innings	–
10 wickets in match	–
Best bowling	3/51
Catches/stumpings	1/–
- Source: Cricinfo, 8 August 2012

Harold Elsdon (19 February 1921 – 8 May 1995) was an English cricketer. Elsdon was a right-handed batsman who bowled right-arm fast. He was born in Lemington, Northumberland.

Elsdon made his debut for Northumberland against the Lancashire Second XI in the 1938 Minor Counties Championship. He made two further appearances for the county before World War II, both in 1939 against Durham and the Yorkshire Second XI. Following the war, Elsdon resumed playing minor counties cricket for Northumberland, playing for the county until 1956, during which time he made 44 further appearances in the Minor Counties Championship, the last of which came against Cheshire.

Playing for Northumberland allowed Elsdon to represent a combined Minor Counties cricket team, making one first-class appearance for the team against Yorkshire at Lord's. Yorkshire won the toss and elected to bat first, making 231 all out in their first-innings, with Elsdon bowling 24 wicketless overs for the cost of 49 runs. The Minor Counties responded in their first-innings by making 210 all out, during which Elsdon was dismissed for a duck by Allan Mason. In their second-innings, Yorkshire made 250 all out, with Elsdon taking 3 wickets during the innings, finishing with figures of 3/51 from seventeen overs. Set 271 for victory, the Minor Counties could only manage to make 135 all out, with Elsdon ending the innings not out on 12.

He died on 8 May 1995 at Hucclecote, Gloucester, Gloucestershire.
