= Jamie Driscoll =

British politician

Councillor Jamie Driscoll
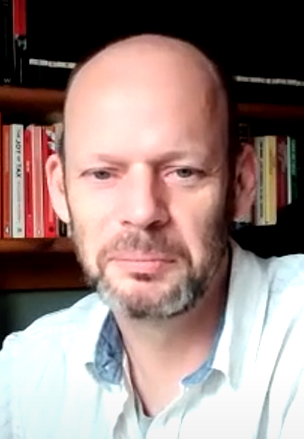
- Driscoll in 2021

Mayor of the North of Tyne
- In office 6 May 2019 – 6 May 2024
- Preceded by: Norma Redfearn (as interim mayor)
- Succeeded by: Position abolished North of Tyne Combined Authority merged with North East Combined Authority (2014–2024) to form North East Mayoral Combined Authority Kim McGuinness (as Mayor of the North East)

Newcastle City Councillor for Monument
- Incumbent
- Assumed office 7 May 2026
- In office 3 May 2018 – 2 May 2019

Leader of Majority
- Incumbent
- Assumed office 16 December 2024

Personal details
- Born: April 1970 (age 56) Middlesbrough, North Riding of Yorkshire, England
- Party: Green Party of England and Wales (since 2025)
- Other political affiliations: Majority (since 2024); Independent (2023–2025); Labour (1985–2023)
- Education: Northumbria University
- Website: jamiedriscoll.co.uk

Jamie Driscoll (born April 1970) is a British Green Party politician serving as a councillor for the Monument ward since 2026 on Newcastle City Council having previously represented the same ward for the Labour Party from 2018 - 2019. He also served as the metro mayor of the North of Tyne Combined Authority from 2019 to 2024. He represented Labour until June 2023 and then became an independent.

Driscoll founded Majority in 2024. He was one of the directors of Your Party's operating company, but resigned in October 2025 following a financial dispute amongst the party's founders. He joined the Green Party of England and Wales in December 2025.

== Early life ==
Driscoll was born in Middlesbrough, North Riding of Yorkshire in 1970. His father was a tank driver in the British army before becoming a shift worker at Imperial Chemical Industries, while his mother was a youth worker and a union shop steward who served as a women's officer for Cleveland County Council and founded the first women's refuge from domestic violence in Middlesbrough. Driscoll stated that his politics was influenced by his mother. He has three siblings: an older brother who served in the Royal Navy; a sister who was a healthcare assistant for the NHS; and a younger brother Jon, who is a football commentator, podcaster and author of The Fifty: Football's Most Influential Players, and Get it Kicked! The Battle for the Soul of English Football.

== Education and career ==
Driscoll left school at 16. He worked as a nurse at the University Hospital of Hartlepool, at a plumbing factory, and as a trainee engineer making breathing apparatus in Blyth, Northumberland, among other jobs. At the age of 22, he secured a grant to study engineering part-time at Northumbria University, which he combined with work as a nightclub bouncer.

After university, Driscoll worked as a project engineer in the electronics and information technology sector, and oversaw large company integrations. He became a manager and company director for a software development firm, and after selling the business he dedicated himself to political activity while homeschooling his children. He was a jiu-jitsu instructor for twenty years before retiring in 2018, and earned wine knowledge qualifications.

== Political career ==
Driscoll joined the Labour Party in 1985, and the Transport and General Workers' Union in 1986. He later switched to Unite the Union. He was an organiser for the Tyne & Wear Anti-Fascist Association, formed in 1983.

In 2015, he campaigned for Ed Miliband in Doncaster North during the 2015 general election and for Jeremy Corbyn in his Labour Party leadership bid. Prior to Corbyn's election, Driscoll acted as his bodyguard during a visit to the north east of England. After Corbyn's victory, Driscoll started the Newcastle branch of Momentum, trained activists and helped organise Momentum's inaugural national conference, Building to Win, in Birmingham in March 2017. In January 2018, he founded Pits & Politics Festivals Ltd, and in July 2018 hosted the first People, Pits and Politics festival in the days preceding the Durham Miners' Gala; the event, sponsored by the Communication Workers Union (CWU), featured Clive Lewis MP, Ken Loach, Paul Mason and Hilary Wainwright as speakers.

He was elected to Newcastle City Council in the May 2018 elections to represent Monument ward. He was a member of the campaigning group and the chair of the Newcastle branch of Momentum. He also served as branch secretary of the Labour Party in the East Gosforth ward.

=== Mayor of North of Tyne ===
In February 2019, Driscoll stood for selection to be Labour's candidate in the 2019 North of Tyne mayoral election, defeating Newcastle council leader Nick Forbes. He ran being supported by figures on the left, including shadow chancellor John McDonnell, Noam Chomsky, Paul Mason, Clive Lewis and Laura Pidcock. He also had organisational support from Unite the Union, Momentum, RMT, Fire Brigades Union, TSSA and Aslef.

Driscoll won the election ahead of the Conservative candidate Charlie Hoult.

As mayor, Driscoll led the North East devolution deal from 2019 onwards, striking an "unlikely political alliance" with Michael Gove, who was appointed the Secretary of State for Levelling Up, Housing and Communities in 2021. The deal was signed in December 2022 and resulted in the creation of the North East Combined Authority in May 2024. Driscoll was described in The Guardian at the time as "the most influential modern Labour figure you have never heard of".

In June 2023, after interview by a panel of the National Executive Committee of the Labour Party Driscoll was unsuccessful in progressing to a ballot of Labour Party members in the selection process to determine a Labour Party candidate for Mayor of the North East. Labour Peer Jenny Chapman defended the decision as "simply guaranteeing the highest quality candidates". Unite the Union and its general secretary, Sharon Graham, criticised the decision to exclude Driscoll. Andy Burnham and Steve Rotheram described the Labour Party as undemocratic, opaque and unfair. Aditya Chakrabortty wrote in The Guardian that Driscoll was a "victim of McCarthyism". He resigned from Labour and later announced that he would stand in the inaugural 2024 North East mayoral election as an independent. He was backed by the former chair of the Socialist Campaign Group of MPs, Lynne Jones, and received support from Green New Deal Rising (a youth organisation with 5 Labour, 4 Green and 3 independent MPs as patrons, linked to the Green New Deal Group led by Colin Hines). Driscoll finished second, 58,399 votes behind Labour candidate Kim McGuinness.

Driscoll joined the Common Sense Policy Group – an interdisciplinary research team organised ahead of the 2024 general election by the Northumbria University political scientist Matthew Thomas Johnson – as a contributor to Act Now: A Vision for a Better Future and a New Social Contract (2024), (Note: The other contributors included geographer Danny Dorling, Compass chair Neal Lawson, Compassion in Politics co-director Jennifer Nadel, behavioural scientist Daniel Nettle, epidemiologist Kate Pickett, Green Party's deputy leader Zack Polanski, public health consultant Allyson Pollock, sociologist Diane Reay and social epidemiologist Richard G. Wilkinson.) a book-length policy proposal centred on universal basic income and modeled on the 1942 Beveridge Report.

=== Post-mayorality ===
On 16 December 2024, Driscoll registered the new organisation Majority with the Electoral Commission to field candidates across Great Britain. He called on Labour members with "a social conscience" to leave their party.

Driscoll and Majority have been involved in discussions around the setting up of a new left-wing party, known by the interim name of Your Party. In April 2025, alongside Andrew Feinstein and Beth Winter, Driscoll became a director of the company MoU Operations Ltd that was set up to manage supporter data for the new party project. He addressed a Majority conference in Newcastle in September 2025 alongside Your Party's leading figure Zarah Sultana. Later that month, MoU Operations received the funds raised through Sultana's Your Party membership launch, which were speculated to have exceeded £1m.

In August 2025, Jamie Driscoll announced he was standing 2026 Newcastle City Council election in Monument ward, and said that a progressive alliance of Majority, the Green Party and independents could win control of Newcastle City Council. Driscoll also announced that Majority had almost 1,000 due-paying members.

In the context of a row with the Independent Alliance-affiliated directors of Your Party over the control of donation money, Driscoll resigned from MoU Operations in late October 2025, entrusting the company to Sultana. He announced in November that he was not a member of Your Party and did not intend to join.

In December 2025, Driscoll announced he had joined the Green Party, planning to stand for election to Newcastle City Council as a Green candidate. In January 2026, he was selected by Newcastle Green Party to contest the Monument ward in the 2026 local election in which he was successfully elected.

== Personal life ==
Driscoll lives with his wife Caroline, who is an NHS doctor in Gateshead, and their two children.

During the Labour Party selection for North of Tyne Mayor Driscoll was criticised for "astonishing hypocrisy" for his children's attendance at a local private school. Following this criticism, Driscoll clarified that although his children had previously attend a private school they were now homeschooled.

He is a member of Greenpeace and Amnesty International, an ambassador for the White Ribbon Campaign, and a former member of Mensa International.

== Bibliography ==
- Driscoll, Jamie; Broadbent, Rachel (16 August 2017). The Way of the Activist. CreateSpace Independent Publishing Platform. ISBN 978-1-9740-9492-9. OCLC 1313868367.
