= Westgate, Newcastle upon Tyne =

Coordinates: 54.971°N 1.621°W

Westgate
- Ward
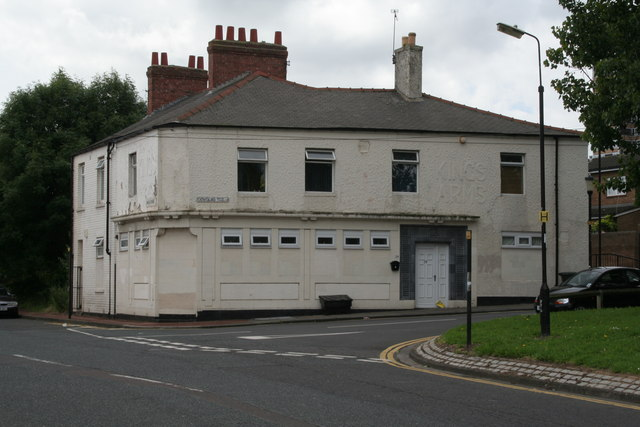
- Kings Arms

- Location within the United Kingdom
- OS grid reference: NZ243641
- Metropolitan borough: Newcastle upon Tyne
- Metropolitan county: Tyne and Wear
- Country: England
- Sovereign state: United Kingdom

Westgate was an electoral ward of Newcastle upon Tyne, in the county of Tyne and Wear, England from 2004 to 2018. The population of the ward taken at the 2011 Census was 10,059.

It contained the majority of the city centre. Westgate Ward was succeeded by Arthur's Hill Ward and Monument Ward.

== History ==
The Municipal Corporations Act 1835 established Newcastle City Council and extended the boundaries of the city to include Elswick, Westgate, Jesmond, Heaton and Byker

== Civil parish ==
Westgate was formerly a township in the parish of Newcastle upon Tyne St John, in 1866 Westgate became a separate civil parish, on 1 April 1914 the parish was abolished to form Newcastle upon Tyne. In 1911 the parish had a population of 27,607.

== Sources ==
- Charleton, Robert John (1899). A History of Newcastle upon Tyne from the earliest records to its formation as a city. London: Walter Scott Ltd.
- Colls, Robert; Lancaster, Bill (2001). Newcastle upon Tyne. A Modern History. Chichester: Phillimore & Co Ltd. ISBN 1-86077-167-X.
