= Arthur's Hill =

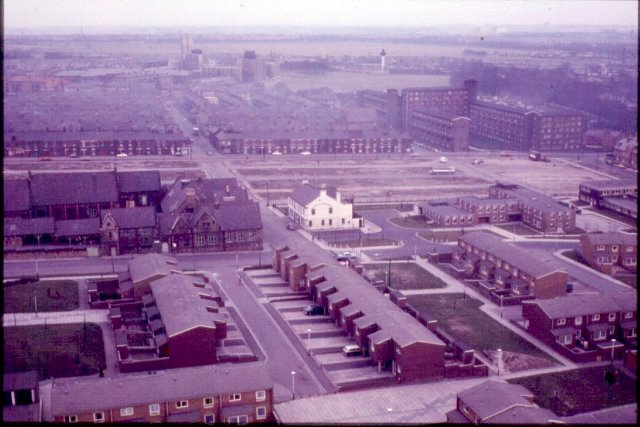
- New build social housing in Arthur's Hill (1975)
  - London: 242 miles (389 km)
- Metropolitan borough: Newcastle upon Tyne
- Metropolitan county: Tyne and Wear
- Region: North East
- Country: England
- Sovereign state: United Kingdom
- Post town: NEWCASTLE UPON TYNE
- Postcode district: NE4
- Dialling code: 0191
- Police: Northumbria
- Fire: Tyne and Wear
- Ambulance: North East
- UK Parliament: Newcastle upon Tyne Central

Arthur's Hill is a district of Newcastle upon Tyne. It lies approximately 1 mile west of Newcastle City Centre. It is bordered by Fenham to the west, Elswick to the south, and Spital Tongues to the north west. It gives name to a Newcastle City Council electoral ward with a population of 14,507. The area was part of the Westgate and Wingrove electoral wards up until 2018.

As the name suggests, Arthur's Hill is atop a large hill overlooking the city. It was known as Westgate until the 1820s. Isaac Cookson developed an estate opposite Westgate Cemetery in 1826. This was named after his first son Arthur, the origin of the area's current name.

== Demographics ==
Arthur's Hill is a multicultural area which many migrants from South Asia settled in with later immigration from Africa and Eastern Europe. It contains many Indian restaurants and shops. As of 2011, 55.7% were White, 29.5% Asian, 6.5% Black, 3.3% Arab and 3.3% Mixed Race. It had a population of 11,029 in 2011. Around 40.6% are Christian, 28.4% non religious and 23.8% Muslim.
