= Dene, Newcastle upon Tyne =

Coordinates: 54.988°N 1.593°W

- Ward
- Location within the United Kingdom
- OS grid reference: NZ261660
- Ceremonial county: Tyne and Wear
- Country: England
- Sovereign state: United Kingdom

Dene is an electoral ward of Newcastle upon Tyne in North East England. The ward takes its name from the nearby gorge at Jesmond Dene. Contained within the ward are government offices of the Department for Work and Pensions and the Freeman Hospital. The population of the ward is 9,554, increasing to 9,667 at the 2011 Census, 3.7% of the total population of Newcastle upon Tyne. Car ownership in the area is 74.8% much higher than the city average of 54.7%.

== Education ==
Within the ward are four schools including two primary schools, Cragside Primary School and Benton Park Primary School. The ward is the home of the Coach Lane campus of Northumbria University.

== Recreation and leisure ==
Jesmond Dene is in the south east of the ward and on Freeman Road is the Paddy Freeman park. Facilities there include a bowling green, two tennis courts, a fenced playground with swings, slides, climbing frames and spring toys. Additionally, a number of private owned leisure facilities are in the ward including the David Lloyd Tennis Club, Novocastrians R.F.C., Heaton & Stannington F.C. and the University Playing Fields.

== Boundary ==
The wards boundaries go from the north east edge of the ward, following the overall northern city boundary west until reaching the metro line at the rear of Gallalaw Terrace. It then heads south following the Ouseburn, past Haddricksmill Bridge and Dene Bridge, down to Red Walk. It then turns east crossing Jesmond Dene to the Pond which lies west of Freeman Road/Jesmond Road. At the roundabout it heads east along Newton Road and continues east along Cragside to the Benton Road roundabout and to the rear of the properties on Cornel Road. At Cochrane Park sports ground it heads north and east around its boundary to Red Hall Drive/Coach Lane, then south along the eastern side of Red Hall Drive to Meridan Way. It then continues east along the north of Meridian Way turning south to the rear of numbers 2 to 46 Slingsby Gardens and onto the Coast Road, heading east past the front of the Wills Building to the East Coast Main Line. It then heads north, adjacent to the main line, then turns east to the rear of the properties on Westminster Way to the junction with Coach Lane. It then continues north along Coach Lane turning west along Rosemont Way to the rear of Spalding/ Penfold and Dunlop Closes to Benton Road. Heading north along the east side of Benton Road to Four Lane Ends Metro station, it then follows the metro line back along to Gallalaw Terrace/ Killingworth Road.

== Charts and tables ==
Age group	Number
Under 16	1,718
16–24	1,339
25–44	3,009
45–64	2,640
65–74	658
75+	537

Ethnicity	Number	%
White	8,692	91.1
Afro-Caribbean	56	0.6
South Asian	440	4.6
Chinese	175	1.8
Other	175	1.8

The ward has 3,910 housing spaces of which 3.6% are vacant this is much lower than the city average of 5.3%. Owner occupied property stands at 83.6% much higher than the city average of 53.3%. The properties are as follows.

Property type	Number	%
Detached	939	24
Semi-detached	1,923	49.1
Terraced	236	6
Flats	812	20.8
Other	3	0.1
