= Lemington =

Coordinates: 54.972°N 1.723°W

- Ward
- Lemington highlighted within Newcastle upon Tyne
- Population: 10,207 (2021.Ward)
- OS grid reference: NZ182646
- Metropolitan borough: Newcastle upon Tyne
- Metropolitan county: Tyne and Wear
- Region: North East
- Country: England
- Sovereign state: United Kingdom
- Post town: Newcastle Upon Tyne
- Postcode district: NE15
- Dialling code: 0191
- Police: Northumbria
- Fire: Tyne and Wear
- Ambulance: North East
- UK Parliament: Newcastle upon Tyne Central and West

Lemington is an area and electoral ward in the Outer West End of Newcastle upon Tyne, in the county of Tyne and Wear, England.

== History ==
Lemington has a strong industrial history. It is famous for its brick glassworks cone, built circa 1787. The River Tyne used to pass very close to Lemington, until the Tyne Improvement Commission cut a new, shorter, straighter channel over the Blaydon Haugh, leaving behind the Lemington Gut. Also visible are the ruins of the former Tyne Iron Company Ironworks which were built in 1797 and decommissioned in 1886. Its coke ovens are still evident near Lemington Power Station. The power station was built in 1903 to supply the tram system with electricity. It was largely demolished in 1946. The remains of Lemington Staithes can be seen on the Lemington Gut near the power station. The staithes used to mark the end of the North Wylam to Lemington Point waggonway, which took coal from the local collieries to the staithes for export. On 12 July 1875 Lemington Station opened on the Scotswood, Newburn & Wylam Railway. On 15 September 1958 the station closed to passengers and on 4 January 1960 the station was closed to goods, but the lines weren't lifted until 1992, when the Ever Ready battery factory in Newburn closed. The Anglo Great Lakes Graphite Plant which operated in the area, also closed around this time.

In 1843 the Lemington graveyard made way for industrial development. This was later used for school grounds. In the 2000s the school was demolished to make way for housing.

Today, it is largely a residential area of the city and includes the large Dumpling Hall housing estate and the Vallum which were constructed in the 1960s and 1970s.

== Politics ==
Since the July 2024 General election, Lemington ward has been part of the Newcastle Central and West constituency represented by Dame Chi Onwurah MP, previously it was in Newcastle North.

The ward is represented by three City Councillors on Newcastle City Council.

Councillor	Party	Elected	Term ends	Notes
Stephen Barry-Stanners	Labour and Co-operative	May 2024	May 2026	
Barry Phillipson	Labour	May 2022	May 2026	Barry was previously a councillor for Lemington between 1990-2008, and again between 2011-2018.
Nix Joanne	Newcastle Independents	May 2023	May 2026	

Kim McGuinness, North East Mayor and former Police and Crime Commissioner started her political career as a councillor in Lemington between 2015 and 2019.

== Notable people ==
- Harold Elsdon (1921–1995), cricketer
- Kim McGuinness (1985-living), politician
