= Chapel House Estate =

Suburban housing estate in England

Coordinates: 54.989188°N 1.73452°W

Chapel House
- Location within Tyne and Wear
- Metropolitan borough: Newcastle upon Tyne
- Metropolitan county: Tyne and Wear
- Region: North East
- Country: England
- Sovereign state: United Kingdom
- Post town: NEWCASTLE UPON TYNE
- Postcode district: NE5
- Dialling code: 0191
- Police: Northumbria
- Fire: Tyne and Wear
- Ambulance: North East
- UK Parliament: Newcastle upon Tyne North

Chapel House is a suburban housing estate in the outer west of Newcastle upon Tyne, England, that was designed by John. T. Bell and built from 1964 until the early 1970s. Made up of private properties, it is approximately 5 miles (8 km) directly from the city centre. It is bordered by Chapel Park, Westerhope, West Denton and Blucher.

Before 2005, Chapel House estate had a middle school, Chapel House Middle School, which catered to about 500 children in the area and beyond. However, this closed in 2005 when the outer west of Newcastle switched to two-tier education. Similarly, Knoplaw Primary School and Milecastle Primary School, (also within Chapel House) used to be first schools.

Chapel House Middle School's land has been built on and now houses Knoplaw Primary School. A groundbreaking event was held on 7 July 2009.

Thomas Bewick School and Walbottle Campus Lower School are no longer situated there.

A campaign by local residents in 2011 led to the protection of Chadderton Field from planned development. It thus became only the second village green to be registered in the city, under the Commons Act, 2006.

Chapel House has a range of buses, (Service Number 40, 11, 72 and 38A) which enable people to get to Newcastle City Centre within 35 minutes. There are five bus stops in the area as well as three bus routes, all going to the city centre (and then beyond to places such as Wallsend, North Kenton and High Heaton) All services are provided by Stagecoach in Newcastle.

There are local shops, two churches, two GP surgeries, and a dentist.
