= Monument, Newcastle upon Tyne =

Electoral ward in Newcastle upon Tyne, England

Monument ward
- Electoral ward
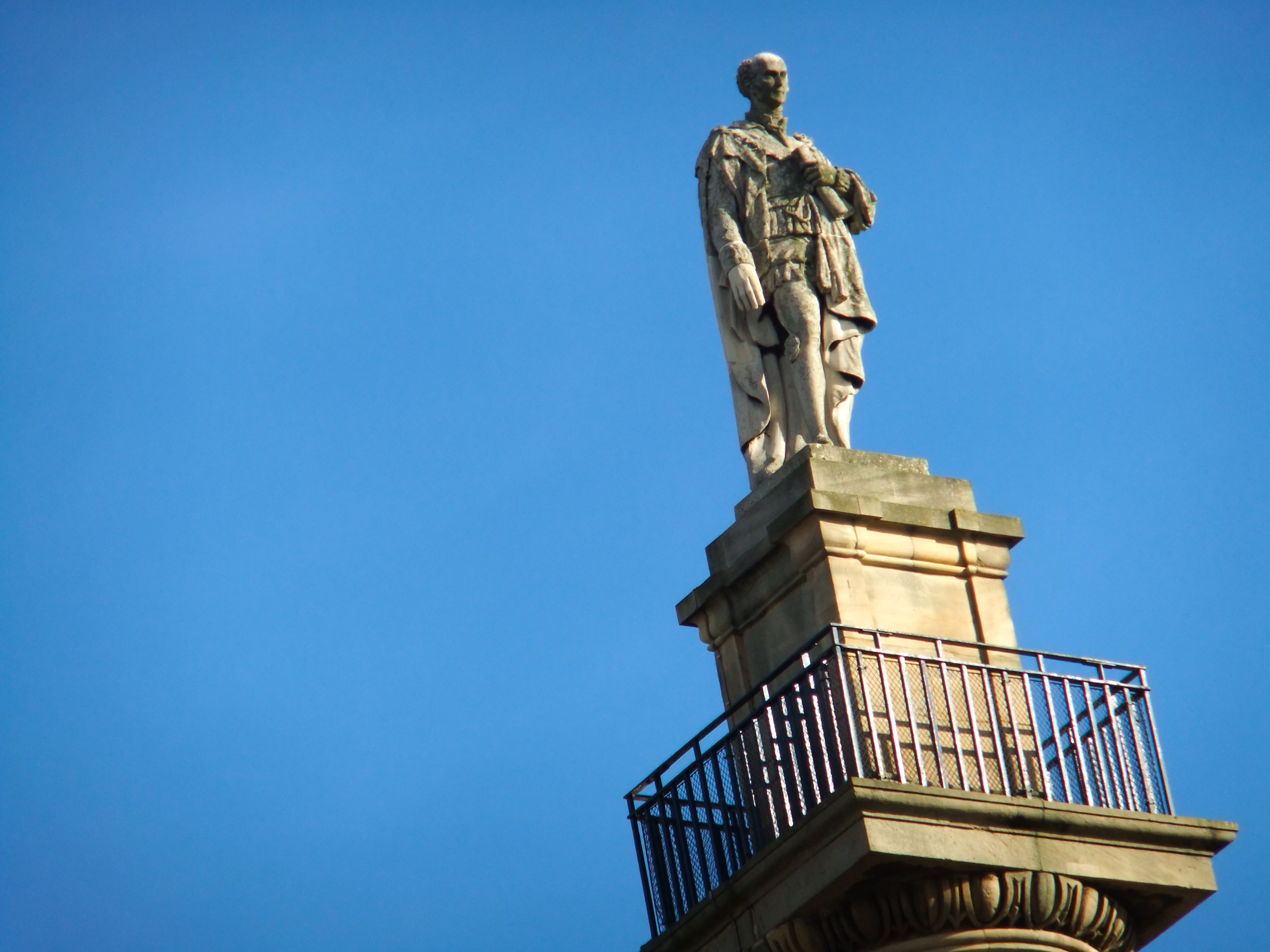
- Grey's Monument

- Monument ward highlighted within Newcastle upon Tyne
- Interactive map of Monument ward
- Coordinates: 54.974°N 1.614°W
- OS Grid ref: NZ 248 644
- Sovereign state: United Kingdom
- Constituent country: England
- Region: North East England
- Metropolitan county: Tyne and Wear
- Metropolitan borough: Newcastle upon Tyne
- Established: 3 May 2018
- Named after: Grey's Monument

Government
  - Type: Metropolitan Borough Council
  - Body: Newcastle City Council
  - Counciller: Jamie Driscoll
  - Counciller: Gareth Jones
  - Counciller: Kiran Sayyed

Area
  - Total: 3.029 km^{2} (1.170 sq mi)

Population (2023)
  - Total: 14,137
  - Density: 4,667/km^{2} (12,090/sq mi)
- (mid-year estimate)
- Time zone: UTC+0 (GMT)
  - Summer (DST): UTC+1 (BST)
- Postcode area: NE1
- Dialling code: 0191
- GSS code: E05011453
- UK Parliament: Newcastle upon Tyne Central and West
- Police: Northumbria
- Fire: Tyne and Wear
- Ambulance: North East

Monument is an electoral ward and area of Newcastle upon Tyne. It was established as an electoral ward in 2018. It takes its name from Grey's Monument. It replaced most of Westgate ward, parts of South Jesmond and some of Ouseburn.

== Overview ==
Monument ward is largely the city centre, including key features such as the Civic Centre, Northumbria University and Newcastle University campuses, the Royal Victoria Infirmary and St James’ Park football ground. It contains the city centre business, shopping, cultural and nightlife districts. Key transport links, including the Central Station and various Metro stations and bus stations are within this ward.

== Education ==
There are no primary or secondary schools within the ward. The ward is home to Newcastle College and Newcastle Sixth Form College and the city campuses of both Newcastle University and Northumbria University.

== Recreation and leisure ==
Leazes Park is in the north-west of the ward. Facilities there include a bowling green, tennis courts and basketball courts, a fenced playground with swings, slides, climbing frames and spring toys.

The ward includes the city's main shopping, cultural and nightlife districts. Attractions include:

- Bigg Market
- Centre for Life
- Chinatown
- Discovery Museum
- Eldon Square Shopping Centre and Northumberland Street
- Grainger Town (including Grainger Market and Grey Street)
- Great North Museum: Hancock
- Newcastle City Hall
- Live Theatre
- the Quayside
- St James' Park (home of Newcastle United F.C.)
- Sport Central
- Theatre Royal
- The Gate
- Tyneside Cinema
- Tyne Theatre and Opera House

== Transport ==
Newcastle Central, the city's main railway station, is in the south of the ward and Manors railway station is situated just within its Eastern edge. There are five Metro stations: Haymarket and Central Station on the north–south route, St James and Manors on the east–west route, with both routes meeting at Monument.

The ward contains the city's two main bus stations for local and regional services; Haymarket Bus Station for services to the north and east, and Eldon Square Bus Station for services heading to the south and west. Newcastle Coach Station station is also the city's main hub for long-distance coach services.

== Boundary ==
Monument ward is bounded by the River Tyne to the south. From the south-west corner, the boundary runs north joining William Armstrong Drive and then east on Scotswood Road and north again on to Park Road. It turns north-east on Westmorland Road, north-west on Rye Hill and north-east on Elswick Road, crossing the Westgate Road and continuing east on Corporation Street. Here the boundary heads northwards briefly on St James’ Boulevard and north-west on Barrack Road, turning north on the footpath through Leazes Park until it meets Richardson Road. The boundary heads north between the student accommodation and the Royal Victoria Infirmary, on to Claremont Street, crossing Claremont Road on to Jedburgh Road. Here the boundary heads south east on the A167/A167(M). Where the road crosses the B1307, the boundary turns off east, then south between the Army Reserves Centre and rear of Harrison Place and Gladstone Terrace. The boundary continues south on Byron Street, Falconar Street, Simpson Terrace, Argyle Street and Tower Street, where it crosses City Road and makes its way south to the Quayside and the River Tyne.
