= Westerhope =

Coordinates: 54.998°N 1.699°W

- Ward
- Location within the United Kingdom
- OS grid reference: NZ193670
- Ceremonial county: Tyne and Wear
- Country: England
- Sovereign state: United Kingdom

Westerhope is an area in western Newcastle upon Tyne, England (from which it takes its name). It was founded to provide housing for working families with sufficient land to grow vegetables. Westerhope expanded substantially in Victorian times with the discovery of workable coal reserves. It was also formerly a ward of the city council until 2018, which had a population of 9,196 at the 2011 Census. The coal reserves have now been largely exhausted and the two pits - Coronation & North Walbottle - have long since closed. After the extraction of 21.5 million tons of coal, the North Walbottle pit was closed in 1968 as further coal extraction would have risked undermining the runway of Newcastle airport, which lies about 5 miles to the North.

With the westward expansion of Newcastle upon Tyne, Westerhope was incorporated into the city as part of the 1974 local government reorganisation. This coincided with large owner-occupied housing estates - Chapel House, Chapel Park, St John's - being developed on the west of Westerhope. At one time these were claimed to be the largest such developments in Europe, although the source of such claims is unclear. Additionally a substantial social housing development, Newbiggin Hall Estate was built at around the same time to the North of the village.

Due to road developments, Westerhope lies in a favourable transport location, in the crook of the A1/A69 junction. This gives good communications to the West, North & South. In contrast, because of the hilly nature of the land, Westerhope has been excluded from the Tyne and Wear Metro system and public transport links to the city centre rely on buses. Additionally, a dual carriageway links the north side of the village to the airport.

Westerhope is now largely a dormitory to Newcastle city, although some light industry exists around the Cobblers Corner area, which is the historic core of the village.
