= Castle, Newcastle upon Tyne =

Coordinates: 55.056°N 1.681°W

- Ward
- Castle highlighted within Newcastle upon Tyne
- OS grid reference: NZ205735
- Ceremonial county: Tyne and Wear
- Country: England
- Sovereign state: United Kingdom

Castle is a ward of the city of Newcastle upon Tyne in North East England. The ward encompasses the villages of Brunswick, Dinnington and Hazlerigg. Castle ward borders the neighbouring authorities of North Tyneside and Northumberland. The population of the ward is 9,912 making up 3.8% of the total population of the city. The population of the ward had increased to 10,069 at the 2011 Census. Car ownership stands at 76.2% much higher than Newcastle's average of 54.7%. House prices in the area average at £189,400.

== Education ==
In the ward are two schools Dinnington First School and Kingston Park Primary, Both have nurseries.

== Recreation and leisure ==
Within the Castle ward are several play areas. There was a branch library at Dinnington but this closed in June 2013 as part of Newcastle City Council's three year budget strategy. A community run library opened in the Memorial Institute in July 2013. The ward is home to Ouseburn Country Park.

== Boundary ==
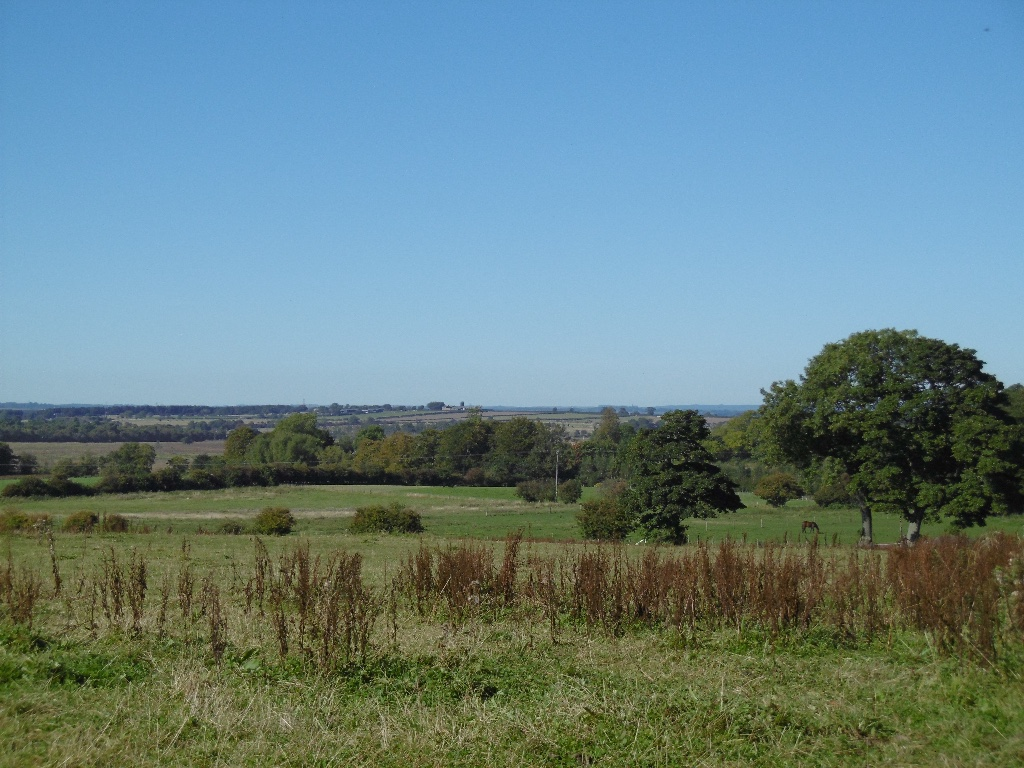
Fields north of Dinnington

The boundary of Castle begins at the intersection of the A1/ Coach Lane and heads west along Coach Lane to Wynd Street. It carries on north along Wynd Street and along the footpath leading onto Hawthorn Avenue. It continues to the back of the properties on Brookside Avenue past the Church of St Cuthbert and the properties on Cragside back to the A1. The boundary continues north along the A1 to Shotton Grange and along the existing Castle/Woolsington ward boundary to the A696 Woolsington Bypass. It then travels southeast along the A696 to the A1 interchange and finally follows the A1 north, turning east on the A1056 and then north between the A1 and B1318 where it rejoins Coach Lane.

== Charts and tables ==
Age group	Number
Under 16	1,938
16–24	985
25–44	3,144
45–64	2,640
65–74	658
75+	537

Ethnicity	Number	%
White	9,552	96.2
Afro-Caribbean	22	0.2
South Asian	146	1.5
Chinese	48	0.5
Other	163	1.6

The ward has 4,160 housing spaces of which 2.1% are vacant this is less than half of the city average of 5.3%. Owner occupied property stands at 78.3% much higher than the city average of 53.3%. The properties are as follows.

Property type	Number	%
Detached	613	14.8
Semi-detached	2,136	51.5
Terraced	1,020	24.6
Flats	378	9.1
Other	0	0
