= Elswick, Newcastle upon Tyne =

District of Newcastle upon Tyne, England

Coordinates: 54°58′08″N 1°38′43″W

Elswick
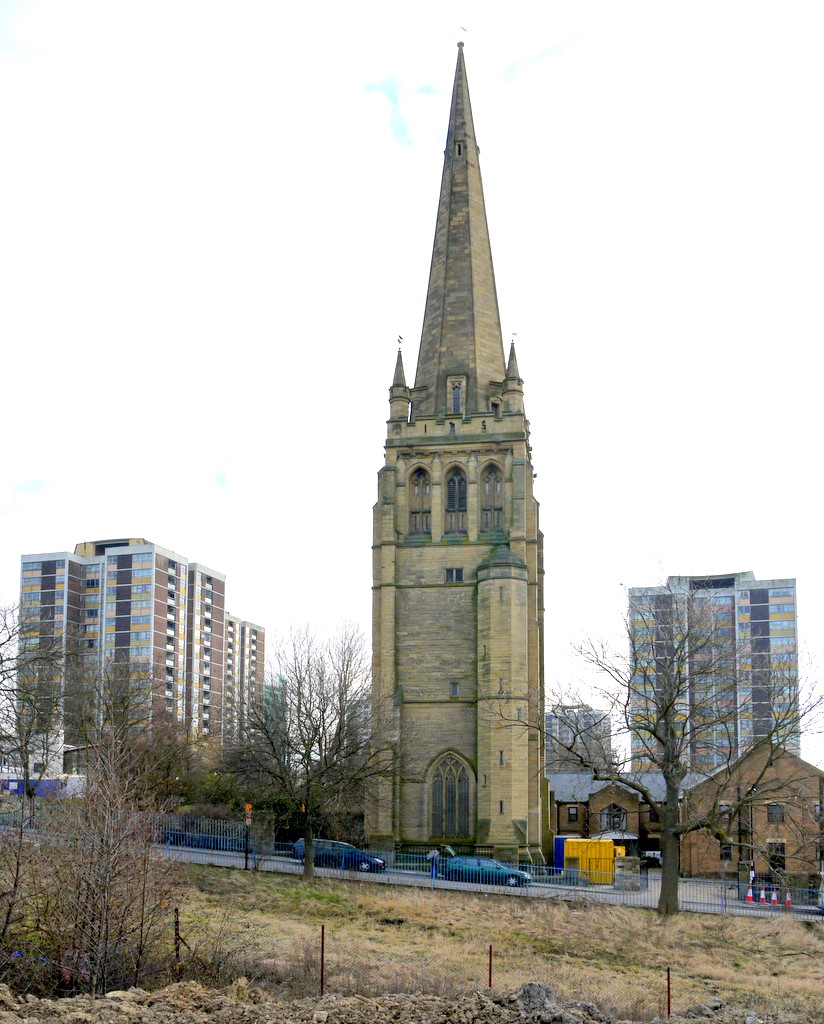
- St Stephen's Church, Low Elswick c. 2010

- Elswick highlighted within Newcastle upon Tyne

- Location within Tyne and Wear
- OS grid reference: NZ228633
  - London: 242 miles (389 km)
- Metropolitan borough: Newcastle upon Tyne
- Metropolitan county: Tyne and Wear
- Region: North East
- Country: England
- Sovereign state: United Kingdom
- Post town: NEWCASTLE UPON TYNE
- Postcode district: NE4
- Dialling code: 0191
- Police: Northumbria
- Fire: Tyne and Wear
- Ambulance: North East
- UK Parliament: Newcastle upon Tyne Central
- Councillors: Nicu Ion (Labour) Habib Rahman (Independent) Ann Schofield (Labour)

Elswick (/ˈɛlzɪk/ EL-zik) is a district and electoral ward of the city and metropolitan borough of Newcastle upon Tyne, in the county of Tyne and Wear, England, 1.9 miles west of the city centre, bordering the River Tyne. Historically in Northumberland, Elswick became part of Newcastle upon Tyne in 1835. Located at a height of 53.1m, Elswick overlooks the River Tyne. Elswick is home to the Newcastle Utilita Arena and Newcastle College, with approximately 45,000 students.

== Toponymy ==
Elswick in its original form Elstewyke, the first element is likely derived from edele, related to the Old English term Æthel meaning noble, and wic meaning farm.

== History ==
In Roman times the Vallum, a defensive barrier behind Hadrian's Wall, reached its easternmost limit in Elswick. The Wall itself carried on as far as Wallsend.

The township of Elswick had originally formed part of the Barony of Bolam and was owned by Tynemouth Priory from 1120 to 1539, with a fishery present on the site. One of the earliest references to the coal mining industry of the north east occurs in 1330, when it was recorded that the Prior of Tynemouth let a colliery, called Heygrove, at "Elstewyke" for a rent of £5 per year. Elswick Colliery had 3 pits working from 1860 onwards. Elswick was owned by the Crown from 1539 to 1628, until it was sold by Charles I.

Elswick Lead Works was set up in 1778 and underwent expansion through the 18th and 19th centuries. The shot tower was eventually closed down in 1951 then demolished from 1968-9 after it had become unsafe.

The Municipal Corporations Act 1835 established Newcastle City Council and extended the boundaries of the city to include Elswick, Westgate, Jesmond, Heaton and Byker

The Priors held a mansion in the middle of Elswick which was later occupied by Elswick Hall. Having been rebuilt a number of times, the last rebuild took place in 1810. The grounds of Elswick Hall became Elswick Park in 1881. Elswick changed significantly in the late 19th century with the extension of the railway from Carlisle to Newcastle in 1839 and the establishment of Armstrong's manufacturing works in 1847. Population increased rapidly during this period, from about 300 in 1801 to 59,165 in 1901. Tyneside flats were built in the area around Scotswood Road to accommodate the workforce.

The Elswick works was founded in 1847 by engineer William George Armstrong. It manufactured hydraulic machinery, cranes and bridges and, later, artillery. In 1882 the company merged with the shipbuilding firm of Charles Mitchell to form Armstrong, Mitchell & Company. Armstrong Mitchell merged again with the engineering firm of Joseph Whitworth in 1897, forming Armstrong, Whitworth & Co.

Elswick railway station was opened in 1889 to serve the area. It was located at the western end of the Elswick Works, whose workforce made up a significant proportion of travellers. The area suffered as a result of the inter-war and subsequent depressions, culminating in the demolition of the Elswick works. The station was closed and then demolished in 1967.

Major development occurred once the Cruddas Park Flats were built up starting in 1961 and finishing construction in 1969.

Elswick was hit hard by the decline of Tyneside's shipbuilding industry during the second half of the 20th century, and by the 1990s was widely regarded as one of the worst parts of Tyneside, if not the whole of Britain. According to a report by The Independent newspaper, unemployment stood at nearly 30% and the area had a widespread problem with drug abuse and arson attacks.

Elswick was formerly a township in the parish of Newcastle-St. John, in 1866 Elswick became a separate civil parish, on 1 April 1914 the parish was abolished to form Newcastle upon Tyne. In 1911 the parish had a population of 58,352. It is now in the unparished area of Newcastle upon Tyne.

== Present ==
Present day Elswick consists of a number of distinct neighbourhoods including the Adelaide Terrace area, Bentinck Estate, Condercum and Denhill Park, Cruddas Park (part renamed Riverside Dene), Elswick Triangle, Gill Street and the Courts, Grainger Park, Jubilee Estate, North Benwell, and both from the St John's and St Paul's areas. The local authority ward also incorporates Newcastle College, and the Utilita Arena Newcastle. As of the 2021 census, Elswick had one of the lowest White populations in Newcastle (43.5%), with a large Asian demographic (35.2%). 1 in 10 residents are Black. Elswick has a slight Muslim plurality (39.3%), with Christians (36.2%) and religiously unaffiliated (21.6%) comprising almost all the remainder. Its population stood at 16,126.

The ward profile shows Elswick is the ward with the highest percentage of children under 14 years in Newcastle and has a lower than average number of senior citizens (10%) than Newcastle as a whole. Elswick has a lower-than-average number of houses in owner-occupation (26.3% compared with 49.9% for Newcastle city).

== Cruddas Park ==
Cruddas Park are a set of 5 high-rise flat apartments in Elswick. The site began construction in 1961, and finished in 1969, as part of redevelopment in the area. There were originally 10 tower blocks, but 5 were demolished in 2012.

Cruddas Park House contains Cruddas Park Shopping Centre. Cruddas Park House also contains a Newcastle College Campus, which includes a library.

== Geography ==
Elswick sits not far from the River Tyne. One point, there was a small tributary of the Tyne named the Elswick Burn, which had its source at Elswick Park, and flows towards the Tyne, but it currently is entirely culverted except for a small section of the stream.

== Sources ==
- Charleton, Robert John (1899). A History of Newcastle upon Tyne from the earliest records to its formation as a city. London: Walter Scott Ltd.
- Colls, Robert; Lancaster, Bill (2001). Newcastle upon Tyne. A Modern History. Chichester: Phillimore & Co Ltd. ISBN 1-86077-167-X.
