= Wingrove, Newcastle upon Tyne =

Coordinates: 54.981°N 1.631°W

- Ward
- Wingrove highlighted within Newcastle upon Tyne
- OS grid reference: NZ236652
- Ceremonial county: Tyne and Wear
- Country: England
- Sovereign state: United Kingdom

Wingrove is an electoral ward of Newcastle upon Tyne in North East England, roughly 2 miles west of Newcastle City Centre. The population of the ward as of mid-2018 was 12,773.
