= Ralph Spencer =

English cricketer

Personal information
- Born: 14 April 1861; Newburn, Northumberland, England
- Died: 23 August 1926 (aged 65); Netherwitton, Northumberland, England
- Batting: Right-handed
- Bowling: Right-arm fast
- Relatives: Walter Trevelyan (great-uncle)

Domestic team information
- Years: Team
- 1881–1882: Cambridge University
- 1899: Northumberland

Career statistics
Competition	First-class
Matches	12
Runs scored	181
Batting average	11.20
100s/50s	–/1
Top score	57
Balls bowled	1,028
Wickets	19
Bowling average	24.26
5 wickets in innings	–
10 wickets in match	–
Best bowling	3/19
Catches/stumpings	23/–
- Source: Cricinfo, 16 June 2019

Ralph Spencer (14 April 1861 – 23 August 1926) was an English first-class cricketer.

The son of Micheal Spencer and his wife, Isabella, Spencer was born at Newburn in April 1861. He was educated at Harrow School, before going up to St John's College, Cambridge. While studying at Cambridge he made his debut in first-class cricket for Cambridge University against an England XI at Fenner's in 1881. He played for Cambridge in the 1881 and 1882 seasons, making twelve appearances and gaining a blue in 1881. He scored a total of 181 runs across these matches, with a high score of 57. As a right-arm fast bowler, he took 19 wickets at an average of 24.26, with best figures of 3 for 19. He later minor counties cricket for Northumberland, making a single appearance in the 1899 Minor Counties Championship against Durham at Jesmond.

Outside of playing cricket, Spencer also played football for Tyne Association, one of the earliest football clubs in the Newcastle area. His grandfather John Spencer had founded the Newburn Steelworks, which Spencer would serve as chairman during a period of decline in the companies fortunes. He died at Netherwitton Hall in August 1926. His great-uncle, Walter Trevelyan, was also a first-class cricketer.
