= Lemington Power Station =

Power station in North East England

Lemington power station
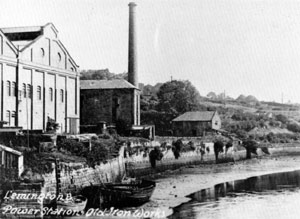
- Lemington Power Station, alongside disused ironworks Viewed from the Lemington Gut c.1903.
- Country: England
- Location: Lemington
- Coordinates: 54°58′28″N 1°42′42″W
- Status: Decommissioned and partially demolished
- Commission date: 1903
- Decommission date: 1919
- Owner: Newcastle and District Electric Lighting Company
- Operator: Newcastle and District Electric Lighting Company

Thermal power station
- Primary fuel: Coal

Power generation
- Units operational: Two 410 kW and one 150 kW C. A. Parsons and Company
- Nameplate capacity: 970 kW

External links
- Commons: Related media on Commons

Lemington Power Station was a small, now demolished coal-fired power station, located in North East England. It was situated on the Lemington Gut, a backwater of the River Tyne, at Lemington, 3.5 mi (5.6 km) west of Newcastle upon Tyne. The station's main building stood until 2017 as a rare example of an early power station, dating from before the nationalisation of the United Kingdom's electrical supply industry.

The station was opened in 1903 with a total generating capacity of 970 kilowatts, the electricity generated being used to power a tram system, and provide local households and streets with electric lighting. The station ceased generating electricity in 1919, however the structure was retained for use as a sub-station until 1946 when the tram line closed. The station was partially demolished in 1949, but was made a locally listed building and its site currently owned by construction company Nortland Construction. In March 2012 Norland applied to Newcastle City Council for permission to demolish the building on the grounds of it being at risk of collapse. The station was finally demolished in 2017.

== Background ==
In the early 1900s, an increasing number of areas were being provided with electricity, and train and tram lines were being electrified. In the area around Newcastle upon Tyne, this required the opening of power stations at Wallsend, Forth Banks and The Close. Two supply companies built the stations, the Newcastle-upon-Tyne Electric Supply Company (NESCo) to the east of Newcastle, and the Newcastle and District Electric Lighting Company (DisCo) to the west.

DisCo built a station at Lemington, in the western outskirts of the city, to provide electricity for a tram line which ran through their supply area, from the City Centre to Throckley. The station was sited amid the derelict buildings of the Tyne Iron Company's ironworks. They had opened in 1797 and closed in 1886. The works were largely demolished, but some of the ironworks' buildings and chimneys still stood unused, and the power station was built amongst them. DisCo opened Lemington Power Station in 1903.

== Design and specification ==
The station consists of a parallel boiler house and turbine hall, which creates a large double-gabled building. It is of steel frame construction with brick cladding. Other features include round-headed openings and ridge ventilators. This building originally housed the station's boilers and turbo generators. Constructed alongside the station was a brick built chimney, to remove gasses from the boilers. The station was first brick built power station in North East England, with corrugated iron being the usual material used prior to this.

The station's boiler house housed three coal-fired Lancashire boilers, each of 200 HP capacity and each with individual economisers. These boilers provided steam for two 410 kilowatt (kW) and one 150 kW direct current Parsons turbo generators. This gave the station a total generating capacity of 970 kW. Before being used in the Lemington power station, these generators had been used in Forth Banks Power Station and in Newburn Steelworks. One of the steam turbines from these sets is now on display at the Electric Power and Historical Museum in Yokohama, Japan, after sitting on display in the entrance to Blyth Power Station for many years.

== Operations ==
The power station was well situated for coal deliveries as it was only 200 yd (180 m) from Lemington Staithes. The staithes marked the end of the Wylam Waggonway, which brought coal from a number of nearby collieries to the staithes for export. Coal was hauled from the staithes to the power station, before being dumped directly into overhead hoppers in the boiler house. From there it was burned in the boilers to provide steam for the turbo generators. This steam was then cooled after use, using condensers, the water for which was taken from the Lemington Gut. This was a backwater of the River Tyne, created when a new channel was cut in 1876.

As well as providing power for the tram system, the station was a source of electricity for local homes. The building of a power station brought major environmental improvements to what was a highly polluted area, because electricity represented a much cleaner source of household energy than coal, which was used at the time. Local households gradually switched to the new power source. A partner in the enterprise of the Lemington power station was Sir Matthew White Ridley, who had considerable interests in coal and banking.

== Closure and present ==
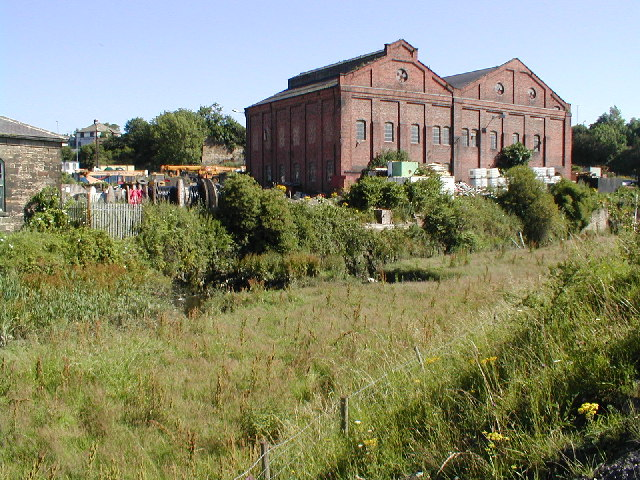
The remains of Lemington Power Station in May 2003

Production of electricity in the station ceased in 1919, ushered in by the completion of an extension to generating equipment at Newburn Steelworks. The building was retained and continued to be used to supply power to the tram route by housing a sub-station, which used rotary converters. The station also provided a service for local residents who wanted their wireless accumulators recharged. The station continued to operate in this way until 1946, when the tram route was closed. The station's chimney was demolished in 1949, along with remaining structures of the Tyne Iron Works, which had stood next to the power station throughout its operation.

The main turbine and boiler building was a locally listed building, standing for over 110 years as a monument to the important role that Tyne and Wear played in the development of electrical supply. The building had been considered for the more protected Listed Building status, but the decision was taken in May 2004 not to promote it. Other early power stations in the area (such as those at Dunston and Wallsend) have all been entirely demolished. The Lemington station remained partly standing due to riverside sites becoming less important to industrial development, leading to the site never being redeveloped.

The building stood amongst a small industrial estate at the foot of the nearby Lemington Glass Cone. Along with the neighbouring Ironworks site, the power station's site is owned by Norland Construction, a crane and plant company formerly known as Reeds Cranes and Plant, who used the building as storage for their machinery. The site is thought to be contaminated with coal products, fuels and oils such as PCBs, as well as dioxins and furans. In 2003, Newcastle City Council released plans that they hoped to redevelop the site for heritage tourism in the future.

The last remaining structures of Lemington power station were demolished in 2017.
