= Newcastle and District Electric Lighting Company =

- Type: Private
- Industry: Electricity supply
- Founded: Newcastle upon Tyne, UK (1889)
- Founder: Charles Algernon Parsons
- Defunct: 1 April 1948
- Fate: Nationalised
- Successor: North Eastern Electricity Board
- Headquarters: Newcastle upon Tyne
- Number of locations: 4 power stations (1908)
- Area served: West of Newcastle upon Tyne to border at Throckley
- Key people: Charles Algernon Parsons, Managing director. William Dods Hunter, Company engineer, later Managing Director.

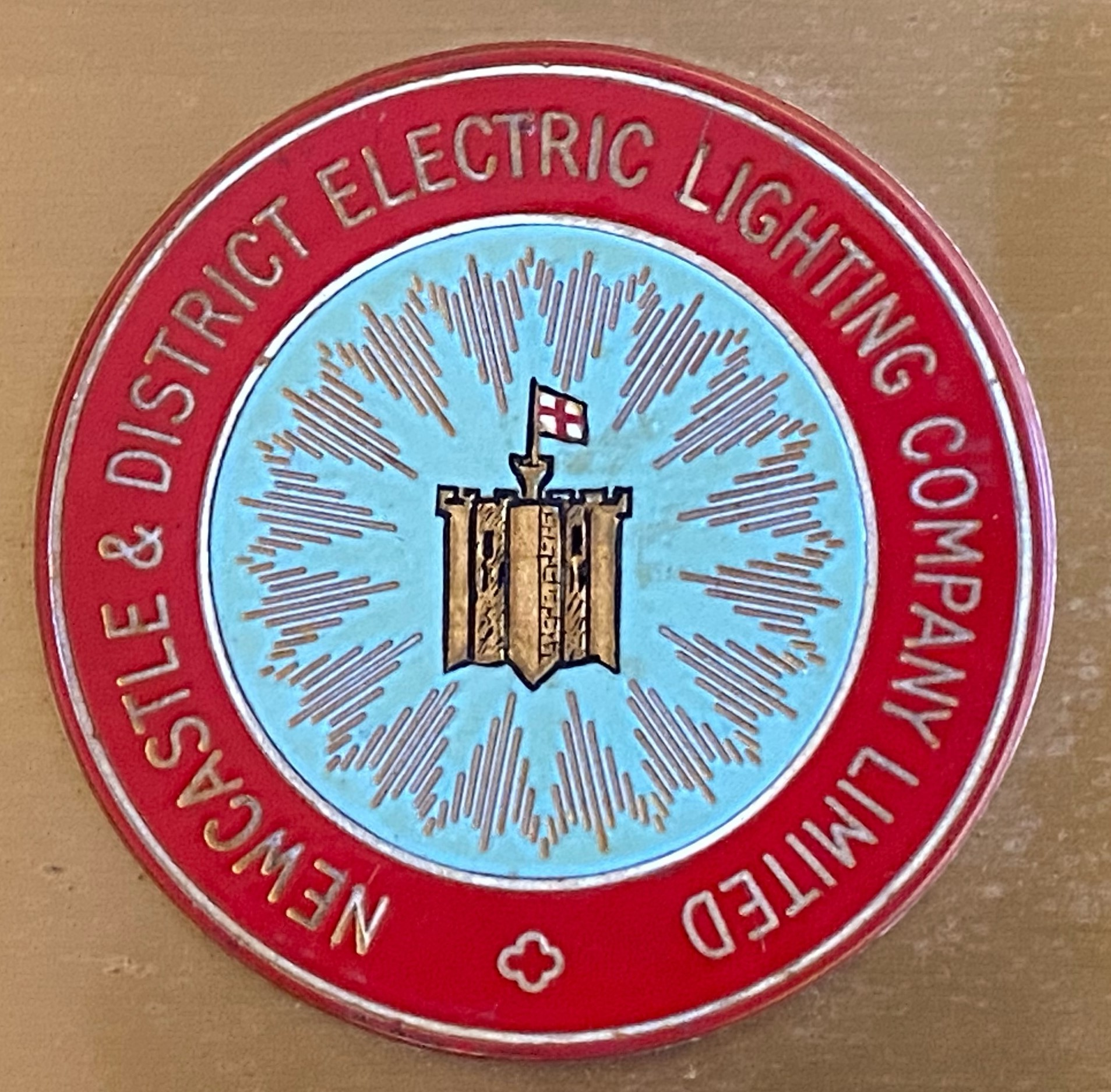

The Newcastle and District Electric Lighting Company (abbreviated to DISCo) was a pre-nationalisation, private electricity supply company, based in Newcastle upon Tyne in North East England. The company was set up in 1889 by Charles Algernon Parsons. The company built a number of small coal-fired power stations in the west end of Newcastle upon Tyne, initially to supply homes and streets with electric lighting. They also provided power for an electrified tram line in the western part of the city.

DISCo was the first electricity supply company in the world to generate electricity using turbo generators, thanks to Parsons' invention of the steam turbine. The company existed until the nationalisation of the UK's electrical supply industry in 1948.

== History ==
Following his invention of the steam turbine in 1884, Charles Algernon Parsons was anxious to move into electricity supply, and so in 1889 he founded up the Newcastle and District Electric Electric Lighting Company. Their distribution area was quickly decided; they were to supply the area of the city to the west of Grainger Street, while the Newcastle-upon-Tyne Electric Supply Company (NESCo), who had also been formed in 1889, were to supply the eastern side of the city. DISCo's distribution area was expanded west to Newburn in 1902, and north to Benwell and Fenham in 1904. They were unable to extend this any further after losing a number of Parliamentary battles with NESCo in the early 1900s.

The first power station the company constructed was at Forth Banks in the city centre in 1890. This was the first power station in the world to generate electricity commercially using steam turbine driven generators. A further power station was constructed near to the Forth Banks station in 1902, on The Close. Another two stations were built by the company at Lemington, in 1903, and at Newburn, in 1908. All of the stations built by the company used steam turbines built by Parson's turbine building company C. A. Parsons and Company.

Charles Parsons was initially held the title as the company's managing director, until 1902 when he stepped down, but remained with the company as a director, before finally retiring in 1909. The majority of the North East's electric supply companies merged with NESCo in 1932 to form the North Eastern Electric Supply Company (again known as NESCo). However, DISCo was one of only three electric supply companies in the region to not merge into NESCo. DISCo ceased to exist in 1948, becoming part of the North Eastern Electricity Board (NEEB), with the nationalisation of the UK's electrical supply industry.
