= Thomas Higinbotham =

Australian engineer

- PORTRAIT OF T HIGINBOTHAM, Engineer in Chief
- Born: 1819; Dublin
- Died: 5 September 1880 (aged 61); St. Kilda Street, West Brighton, Victoria
- Education: Castle Dawson School and Royal Dublin Society House
- Parent(s): Henry Higinbotham, Sarah (née Wilson)
- Engineering career
- Discipline: civil engineer
- Projects: Bendigo railway line, Outer Circle railway line, Victoria

Thomas Higinbotham (1819 – 5 September 1880), was an Irish-born civil engineer and civil servant, particularly associated with the development of railway projects in England and Australia.

== Education and training ==
Higinbotham was born in Dublin, the third son of Henry Higinbotham, merchant, and his wife Sarah, née Wilson, and was educated in Dublin at Castle Dawson School near Blackrock and at the Royal Dublin Society House.

Higinbotham moved to London in about 1839, initially working for a firm that promoted railway companies, and often appeared before parliamentary committees on railways, then as an engineer on British railways, where he gained high repute in his profession. In about 1838–9 he moved to London and entered the office of Sir William Cubitt, who was mentor to several Victorian railway engineers. Subsequently, Higinbotham was appointed as assistant engineer of the South Eastern Railway on the Ashford and Canterbury branch. Afterwards, Cubitt, who was advising engineer to the Great Northern Railway, had him appointed as resident engineer on the Huntingdon section of that railway. Higinbotham was elected a member of the Institution of Civil Engineers on 7 February 1854.

Thomas Higinbotham

== Migration to Australia ==
In 1857, Higinbotham moved to Melbourne, Australia, and lived with his eldest brother George's household in Melbourne. He never married.

Shortly after his arrival in Victoria, Higinbotham was appointed Chief Engineer of Roads and Bridges in the colony. In 1860 he was appointed engineer-in-chief of the Victorian Railways, replacing the first engineer George Christian Darbyshire. Higinbotham supervised the surveying and construction of all new Victorian lines (his first projects were lines to Ballarat and Echuca via Bendigo) and championed various rail improvements, including city station locations, construction of Melbourne's Outer Circle Railway, adaptations to permit unbroken rail traffic between Sydney and Melbourne, and, importantly, uniform adherence to a standard gauge of five feet 3 inches across all Victoria railways.

Along with other senior public servants, he was removed from office in January 1878 by the Berry government, and was replaced by Robert Watson. Over the next two years, Higinbotham was invited by the South Australian, Tasmanian and New Zealand governments to report on their railway systems.

== Final year ==
In March 1880, the Service government reappointed him engineer-in-chief of the Victorian Railways, but the ministry soon fell and Higinbotham was unhappy under its successor. He had decided to resign but died in his sleep on 5 September, to be replaced as engineer-in-chief by William Elsdon.

His long-standing and status in the Railways Department was rewarded on his retirement by a sumptuous banquet and presentation.

== Bibliography ==
- Wettenhall, R. L. 'Higinbotham, Thomas (1819–1880)', Australian Dictionary of Biography, Volume 4, Melbourne University Press, 1972, pp 397–398.
- Cumming, D.A. Some Public Works Engineers in Victoria in the Nineteenth Century Technology Report No. TR-85/10. August 1985.
- 'Obituary: Mr. Thomas Higinbotham, M.I.C.E.', Transactions and Proceedings of the Royal Society of Victoria, vol 17, 1880, pp 91–92;
- 'Obituary' The Age (Melbourne), 6 September 1880;

Contemporary Images –
