= Walter Trevelyan =

English cricketer and barrister

Personal information
- Full name: Walter Blackett Trevelyan
- Born: 18 March 1821; Morpeth, Northumberland, England
- Died: 10 October 1894 (aged 73); Golders Green, Middlesex, England
- Batting: Unknown
- Relatives: Ralph Spencer (great-nephew)

Domestic team information
- Years: Team
- 1842–1843: Cambridge University
- 1846–1851: Marylebone Cricket Club

Career statistics
Competition	First-class
Matches	10
Runs scored	155
Batting average	9.11
100s/50s	–/–
Top score	44*
Catches/stumpings	3/–
- Source: Cricinfo, 28 March 2019

Walter Blackett Trevelyan (18 March 1821 – 10 October 1894) was an English first-class cricketer and barrister.

== Life and legal career ==
Trevelyan was born at Netherwitton Hall in Morpeth to Raleigh Trevelyan and Elizabeth Grey. He was educated at Harrow School and the Edinburgh Academy, before going up to Gonville and Caius College, Cambridge. While studying at Cambridge, he made his debut in first-class cricket for Cambridge University against Cambridge Town Club at Parker's Piece. He played first-class cricket for Cambridge University until 1843, making six appearances and gaining a cricket blue. He appeared for a Midland Counties cricket team in 1843, playing against the Marylebone Cricket Club (MCC) at Leicester.

He graduated from Gonville and Caius College with a law degree in 1844, with admission to the Inner Temple coming in November of that year. He appeared in further first-class matches for the MCC, playing twice in 1846 and once in 1851. Playing a total of ten first-class matches, Trevelyan scored 155 runs at an average of 9.11, with a high score of 44 not out. He was later admitted to the Middle Temple in April 1858 and was called to the bar later that same month. He served as a barrister on the Northern and North-Eastern Circuits until his death in October 1894 at Golders Green. He was survived by his wife, Helena Caroline Trevelyan, who he had married in 1849, with the couple having four children. His great-nephew, Ralph Spencer, also played first-class cricket.
