= Forth Banks Power Station =

Coal-fired power station in England

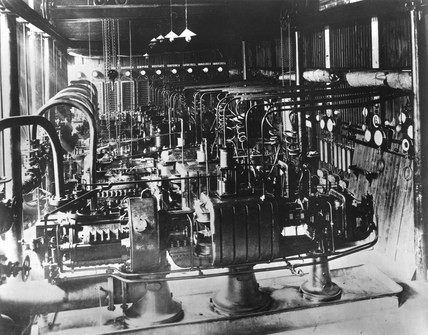
- The interior of Forth Banks power station, 1892
- Country: United Kingdom
- Location: Newcastle upon Tyne
- Coordinates: 54.9658°N 1.6162°W
- Status: Decommissioned
- Commission date: 1890
- Decommission date: 1907
- Owner: Newcastle and District Electric Lighting Company
- Operator: Newcastle and District Electric Lighting Company

Thermal power station
- Primary fuel: Coal

Power generation
- Units operational: Two 75 kW, three 500 kW and six 150 kW C. A. Parsons and Company
- Nameplate capacity: 150 kW (1890); 2,400 kW (1907)

External links
- Commons: Related media on Commons

Forth Banks Power Station was a coal-fired power station in North East England. It was situated in the city centre of Newcastle upon Tyne on Forth Banks, a street to the rear of Newcastle Central station. Put up in a disused factory building in 1890 by the Newcastle and District Electric Lighting Company (DisCo), it is notable as the first power station in the world to use turbo alternators, as well as being one of the first municipal power stations in the United Kingdom.

In its seventeen-year operating history, the station used various pieces of generating equipment and so had various generating capacities. It ceased to be used following an expansion of the nearby Close Power Station in 1907.

== Background ==
The Newcastle and District Electric Lighting Company (DisCo) was established by Sir Charles Algernon Parsons and registered as a company on 14 January 1889. While anticipating the obtainment of the necessary powers from the Board of Trade, which they were granted without opposition in 1891, the company set about acquiring their first site in Newcastle's Forth Banks area, as well as ordering machinery and obtaining a sufficient number of customers to justify commencement. In November 1889, the company purchased buildings from Hawthorn Leslie and Company which had formed part of their Forth Banks works, used by their marine engine department prior to moving to new works at St. Peter's. In January 1890, the Forth Banks Power Station was commissioned.

In opening the station, DisCo became the first electric company to ever trust completely in steam turbines. This was the first time steam turbine and turbo alternator machinery of any kind had been employed in a power station, and the units DisCo ordered for the station were the largest to have ever been built at that time, as well as the first to have been built for a particular purpose.

== Design and specification ==
The equipment initially installed in the station was two 75 kilowatt turbo alternators, built by Clarke, Chapman, Parsons and Company of Gateshead. These were provided with steam by three Lancashire boilers built by Hawthorn Leslie and Company, which fed saturated steam into the turbines at a pressure of 140 lb. The turbo alternators operated at 4,800 revolutions per minute, producing single-phase electric power at 1,000 volts (V) and 80 cycles. They were also fitted with exciters at the end of their alternator shafts.

In 1892, DisCo decided to improve the economy of the station by operating the turbines in conjunction with a condenser. Steam from the turbines was taken to a condenser via a wrought iron galvanised pipe 2 feet (0.61 m) in diameter. The condenser had a cooling surface of 1,512 square feet (140.5 m^{2}) and was composed of 790 brass tubes each 9 feet 8.5 inches (2.959 m) long and 0.75 inches (19 mm) in diameter. The condenser and its pumps were placed in a pit, and driven by a tandem compound pumping engine, supported on beams above the pit. The engine ran at 60 RPM.

In 1900 two 400 kW turbo-dynamo sets were installed followed in 1902 by two 1,000 kW tandem turbo-dynamo sets. Various turbo-generators spent time working at Forth Banks, and two 410 kW Parsons machines which spent time at the station were installed in DisCo's Lemington Power Station by 1907. By 1907, some of the original turbo alternators operating at Forth Banks had been discarded and new ones had been added due to rapid developments in the size, power and efficiency of turbo alternators. By then, the station was operating three 500 kW and six 150 kW AC turbo generators, giving a total generating capacity of 2,400 kW. The station's boiler room contained eight Lancashire boilers, each with a capacity of 200HP, and three Green economisers.

== Operations ==
Coal was delivered by rail via a high level railway behind the station from Newcastle central station to bunkers in the Hawthorne Leslie yard. From here it was conveyed by chutes and screw conveyors to the boiler house. Condensing water for the station was taken from the nearby River Tyne, through a 300 feet (91 m) long brick tunnel.

== Closure and present site use ==
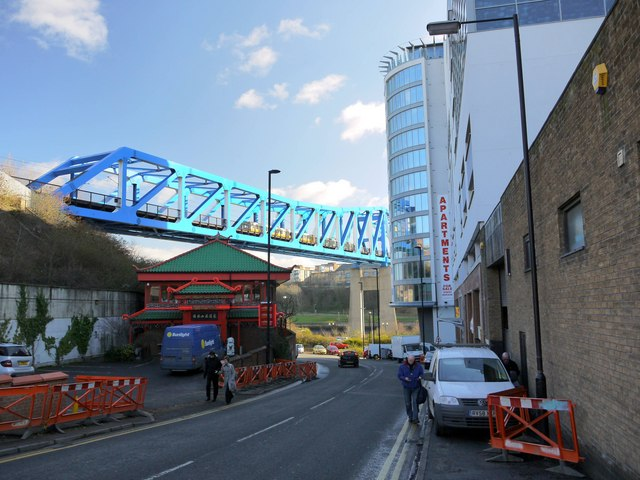
A Chinese restaurant has since been built on the site of the station

Because the station's buildings hadn't been constructed specifically as a power station and were already old at the time of its opening, the power station was recorded as being in a "rather dilapidated shape" in 1907. It was decided that it would have had to be rebuilt if operations were to continue. This, combined with the fact that the station only generated electricity in single phase A.C. current, led to the station being abandoned by DisCo in 1907, once the nearly adjoining Close Power Station had been completed. The station has since been demolished, and a Chinese restaurant and part of the Queen Elizabeth II Metro Bridge have since been built on the site.

Preceded by NA	Largest Power Station in the UK; 1890-1891	Succeeded by Deptford East Power Station
