= Victorian Institute of Engineers =

Engineering organization of Australia

The Victorian Institute of Engineers (VIE) was founded in 1883 in Melbourne, Victoria Australia.

In 1885 there were 124 members including 40 civil engineers engaged in hydraulic, gas, electric and roadway engineering, about 10 in mining, six in marine, and about 68 mechanical engineers. the Railway engineer Robert Watson was the first president of the institute, while other presidents included William Charles Kernot, Joshua Thomas Noble (Noble) Anderson, James Alexander Smith and John Monash.

The purpose of the institute was for the creation of '...an Association where the Civil, Mechanical, Marine, Hydraulic, Mining, Agricultural, Gas, Electric, and other branches of Engineering not so enumerated will be represented, papers read, and all matters connected with these branches be discussed with a view to mutual improvement, and the cultivation of friendly relations between the Members of the different branches of the profession of Engineering'. Members were engaged in general engineering in any of its branches, and Junior Members, between the ages of 17 and 21, were students at the University or apprenticed or articled in any branch of engineering. The Institute's membership had fallen to only 99 in 1906 and in 1912 had only risen to 205. James Alexander Smith (c1864-1940), a consulting engineer was instrumental in calling for a national unification of engineering in 1909. The Institution of Engineers, Australia was eventually formed in 1919, and the Victorian Institute of Engineers continued as a separate but affiliated body until 1944.

== Proceedings ==
The Proceedings of the Victorian Institute of Engineers from 1883-1948 have been digitised, funded by Engineering Heritage Victoria, and are searchable online through University of Melbourne, Library, Digitised Collection.
