= Robert Watson (engineer) =

English-Australian civil engineer (1822–1891)

- Robert Watson
- Born: 21 November 1822; Dartington
- Died: 7 April 1891 (aged 68); Melbourne, Victoria
- Engineering career
- Discipline: civil engineer
- Projects: North East railway line, Victoria

Robert Watson (21 November 1822 – 7 April 1891) was an English and Australian civil engineer. He was also a surveyor and railway engineer.

== Family life and education ==
Robert Watson was born on 21 November 1822 at Dartington, near Totnes, Devonshire, England. He was educated first at local schools, and subsequently at the Exeter Diocesan College. Watson married Elizabeth Galsworthy not long after arriving in Victoria, who died several years afterwards in England. He had two sons, only one of whom, Robert, survived him. Robert Watson's brother Mr. G. H. Watson, was also a surveyor, and for a while was residing at Sandhurst in Victoria.

== Training and early career ==
In the 1830s, Watson became articled pupil to Henry Symons, of Plymouth, where he had experience in the construction of the South Devon Railway, and was also engaged under William Froude on the South Devon and Tavistock Railway and the North Devon Railway. Between 1849 and 1861 he spent a year with an architect in London, and a year with a mechanical engineer working on the erection of the Hanwell and the Warwick Lunatic Asylums. In 1852 he joined Messrs. Locke and Errington, working on the Shrewsbury and Aberystwyth and the Direct Portsmouth railway lines.

== Migration to Australia ==
Watson left England in November 1854, travelling to Melbourne, Victoria. This was a time when the infant colony was commencing large railway construction projects, in comparison with the end of the 'railway mania' in Britain and the decline in railway construction, which saw many of the new profession of civil engineer unemployed. The obituaries of a number of these early members of the profession published by the Institution of Civil Engineers refer to the member being forced to retreat to the family property to be supported through the downturn, or for those from less well established families to find employment overseas.

Watson almost immediately joined George Christian Darbyshire, Engineer of Construction, then District Surveyor at Williamstown. The surveys were under the control of the Surveyor-General, Captain (Sir Andrew Clarke), and Darbyshire. His first work was to lay out the main road from Melbourne to Ballarat, with instructions to examine the country with a view to possible future railway construction. The levels over this road were the first taken deep into the country. The datum was an assumed low-water mark in Hobson's Bay, and the levels for the whole railway system of the colony were reduced to it.

== Victorian Railways ==
In his capacity as Resident Engineer in the Victorian Railways, Watson superintended the construction of the Geelong–Ballarat railway line, the Sandhurst and Echuca line, the North East railway line and its branches, the Gippsland line and branches, and many of the lines to the Western District. The line from Bacchus Marsh to Ballan, constructed some thirty years after his original survey follows literally the route he marked out, notably in the difficult part immediately after leaving Bacchus Marsh, where there is a steep ascent of 300 feet in a distance of less than a mile. Having satisfactory carried out these works, he was granted twelve months' leave of absence on account of ill health, and visited Europe, accompanied by his wife, who died in England. He returned to Melbourne and resumed work in the Railway Department.

In 1878, a political crisis let to the Government dismissing the Engineer in Chief Thomas Higinbotham along with 137 other public services in what became known as "Black Wednesday" – 8 January 1878. Watson took over as Engineer-in-Chief. In 1880 a new Ministry expressed a wish to redress what had been regarded as a great injustice and wrong, by re-instating Higinbotham. Watson was offered the position of Senior Resident Engineer, without any alteration in the salary he had been receiving, and his position was to be only temporary, as changes were contemplated which would make it possible for him to resume the office of Engineer-in-Chief. However, he elected to retire, and Mr. Higinbotham was re-instated. Watson instead took on a challenging expedition for the Queensland Government to explore the country from the East Coast to the Gulf of Carpentaria, with a view to the construction of a railway. At the sudden death of Higinbotham in 1880, William Elsdon took over for 2 years before his retirement in 1882, and Watson was then asked to return to his former position as Engineer in Chief, which he held up to the time of his death.

== Further career and death ==
Watson was elected a Member of the Institution of Civil Engineers on 1 December 1868. He was elected as the founding president of the Victorian Institute of Engineers when it commenced in 1883 and was also president 1884. He was also a member of the Philosophical Institute of Victoria from 1857–1859, and its successor the Royal Society of Victoria, from 1860, whose records identify him as being employed in the Government Railway offices in Geelong between 1857 and 1860, demonstrating his close involvement in the design and construction of the Geelong–Ballarat railway line.

Robert Watson; C.E. Member 1857 Government Railway Offices PIV Robert Watson; C.E. Member 1858 PIV Robert Watson; C.E. Member 1859 Geelong Government Railway Office PIV Geelong, Vic, Australia Robert Watson; C.E. Member 1860 Geelong Government Railway Office RSV

Watson is credited with the introduction of lighter and therefore cheaper railways than those employed in English practice, through the use of timber bridges with less substantial earthworks. He died on 7 April 1891, at the Melbourne Club, of Bright’s disease and congestion of the lungs.

== Bibliography ==
- Cumming, D.A. Some Public Works Engineers in Victoria in the Nineteenth Century Technology Report No. TR-85/10. August 1985.
- Lee, Robert. The Railways of Victoria 1854–2004 Melbourne University Publishing Ltd, ISBN 978-0-522-85134-2.
- Harrigan, Leo J. (1962). Victorian Railways to '62. Public Relations and Betterment Board. p. 274.
