= Parlington (house) =

Heritage-listed house in Melbourne, Victoria, Australia

- Location of the house in Greater Metropolitan Melbourne
- Alternative names: Verulam

General information
- Status: Completed
- Type: House
- Architectural style: Victorian Italianate
- Location: 46 Parlington Street, Canterbury, City of Boroondara, Melbourne, Victoria, Australia
- Coordinates: 37°49′01″S 145°03′44″E
- Completed: 1888; 138 years ago
- Client: William Elsdon

Technical details
- Material: Bricks; stucco

Design and construction
- Architect: James Gall (attrib.)

Victorian Heritage Register
- Official name: Parlington
- Type: Registered place
- Designated: 12 April 1989
- Reference no.: VHR H0731
- Heritage overlay no.: HO105
- Category: Residential buildings (private)

Parlington, also known as Verulam, is a house located at 46 Parlington Street in Canterbury, in the City of Boroondara, in the inner eastern suburbs of Melbourne, in Victoria, Australia.

Built in c. 1888 on the traditional lands of the Wurundjeri people, the house was added to the Victorian Heritage Register on 12 April 1989 in recognition of its historical and architectural significance.

== Description ==
William Elsdon was a British-born civil engineer who served as the chief engineer of the Melbourne & Hobson's Bay Railway Company from 1854 to 1880 and then for the Victorian Railways from 1880 to 1882. Following his retirement, Elsdon and his wife, Mary Ann Reid, built Parlington in the Victorian Italianate style in c. 1888 as their family home, whose design is attributed to James Gall. Elsdon died in 1904.

Subsequent owners included Albert Terry, a nineteenth-century Melbourne brewer, who founded the West End and Victoria breweries, that were merged into the Carlton & United Breweries from 1904. Terry died in 1907 – at the time the house was called Verulam.

In 1912, the Victorian Italianate houses and their grounds, comprising both Parlington/Verulam and nearby Torrington, were subdivided to form the Parlington Estate. Beginning in 1913, the estate developed rapidly, and was almost entirely complete in a single decade. Local builder George Simpson was responsible for three rows of distinctive semi-detached houses, massed as single villas with elaborate Arts and Crafts detail, along Burke Road and Torrington Street.

Arthur William Relph was also a resident at the subdivided Verulam, until his death in 1948.

== See also ==
- Architecture of Melbourne
- List of places on the Victorian Heritage Register in the City of Boroondara
