= Callaly Castle =

Country house in Northumberland, England

- Northumberland, England, UK
- Sheep Pasture in the Grounds of Callaly Castle

Location
- Location in Northumberland
- Coordinates: 55.383°N 1.921°W
- Grid reference: NU051099

Callaly Castle is a Grade I listed building and a substantial country house to the north of the village of Callaly, which is some 14.5 km (9.0 mi) to the west of Alnwick, Northumberland, England.

It is situated near the site of a 12th-century motte castle and an Iron Age hill fort. A pele tower was built in the 14th or 15th century and this was subsequently incorporated, as the west wing, of a new house built by John Clavering in 1619. The first major additions were made in 1676 by architect Robert Trollope. In 1707 further alterations were made which more or less concealed all the earlier features. In 1750 it was further extended.

The gardens were reconfigured in 1770, possibly by one or more the Kennedy brothers, leading gardeners and nurserymen, who created a similar three walled pleasure garden at Croxdale Hall in County Durham for the Salvin family who were also Catholic and had family connections with the Clavering family.

The castle was for many years the home of the Clavering family and incorporated a Roman Catholic chapel which was deconsecrated when the Claverings sold the property in 1877.

Alterations were made in the 18th and 19th centuries followed by major restoration work by the new owner Alexander Browne in the 1890s.

In 1987 it was divided into residential wings by the architect Kit Martin.

== Sources ==
- Allsopp, Bruce; Clark, Ursula (1969). Historic Architecture of Northumberland. Newcastle upon Tyne: Oriel Press. ISBN 0 85362 062 8.
