= William Haswell Stephenson =

British industrialist, politician and philanthropist (1836–1918)

Sir William Haswell Stephenson
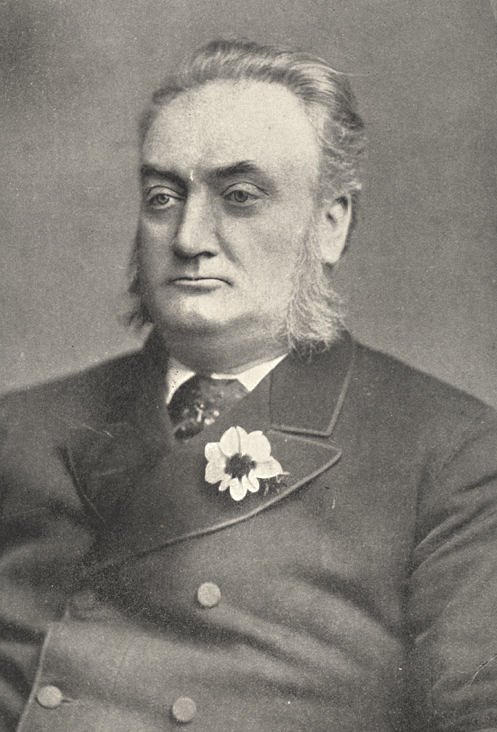
- Stephenson in c. 1894

Lord Mayor of Newcastle Upon Tyne
- In office: 1875; 1884; 1894; 1902; 1909 - 1911
- Monarchs: Queen Victoria; Edward VII; George V

Sheriff of Newcastle upon Tyne
- In office 1886
- Preceded by: Joseph Baxter Ellis
- Succeeded by: Thomas Bell

Personal details
- Born: William Haswell Stephenson; 15 May 1836 Throckley Hall, Throckley
- Died: 7 May 1918 (aged 81)
- Spouse: Eliza Mary Bond (m.1862)
- Children: 2
- Education: Wesley College
- Occupation: Politician; Industrialist
- Awards: Freedom of the City (1910)

Sir William Haswell Stephenson (15 May 1836 – 7 May 1918) was a British industrialist, politician and philanthropist who repeatedly served as the Lord Mayor of Newcastle upon Tyne.

== Personal life ==
Stephenson was born at Throckley, near Newcastle upon Tyne, on 15 May 1836. His family were Methodists and his ancestors had been involved in John Wesley's first establishment of Methodism in the north east of England in the 1740s. He was educated at Wesley College in Sheffield. He became a Methodist local preacher in 1859, and was a supporter of the Local Preachers' Mutual Aid Association.

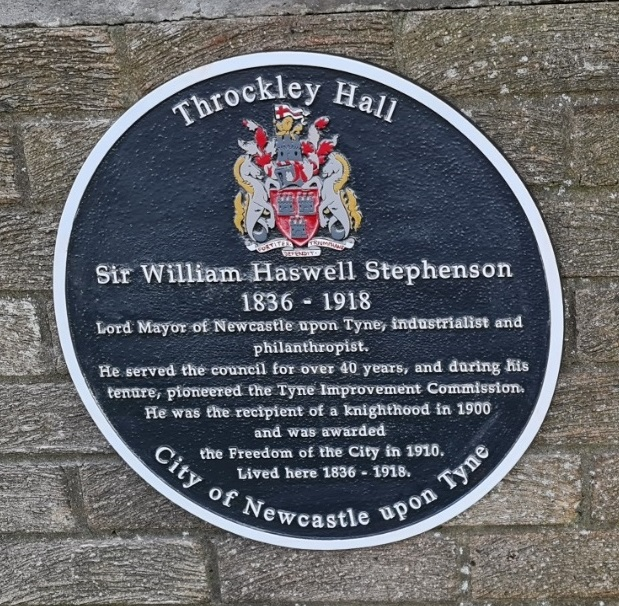
Plaque at Throckley Hall commemorating Stephenson

He married Eliza Mary Bond, from Lincolnshire, in 1862. She died in December 1901, aged 67. They had two daughters, Charlotte, who died before her father, and Kate.

Stephenson died on 7 May 1918.

During his earlier life as well as during his time as Mayor of Newcastle Upon Tyne, Stephenson lived in the manor house Throckley Hall in Throckley with his wife and two daughters. Stephenson was born in the same house, then known as Throckley House, prior to its expansion in c. 1850 and renaming to Throckley Hall, as it continues to stand to this day.

The manor house Throckley Hall has been preserved and remains a private residence along with the associated land.

== Career, public office and philanthropy ==
Stephenson was involved in his family's business, the Throckley Coal Company, and later in other local businesses including John Spencer and sons, steel manufacturers, and Airedale Mills. He was Mayor of Newcastle upon Tyne in 1875, 1884, and 1894; Lord Mayor in 1902, 1909, 1910, and 1911; and sheriff in 1886. In November 1902 he received the Lord Mayor (Sir Marcus Samuel) and Sheriffs of the City of London on an official visit to Newcastle.

Together with his wife he endowed several early public libraries in Newcastle. In 1896 the Stephenson Library at Elswick was the first branch library in the city, built at a cost of £4,000. It became West End Leisure and Learning in 1984, later a housing office, and then West End Woman and Girls Centre. The Victoria Library in Heaton was opened in 1898; by 2001 it was no longer in use as a library and the council had proposed selling the building but after local objections it was agreed to use it as a centre for the local Muslim community. After his wife's death in 1901 Stephenson built the Lady Stephenson Library in Walker; opened in 1908 it was still in use as a library, also known as Walker Library, until it closed on 29 June 2013 and was refurbished in 2014 to form the premises of Cambridge Scholars Publishing.

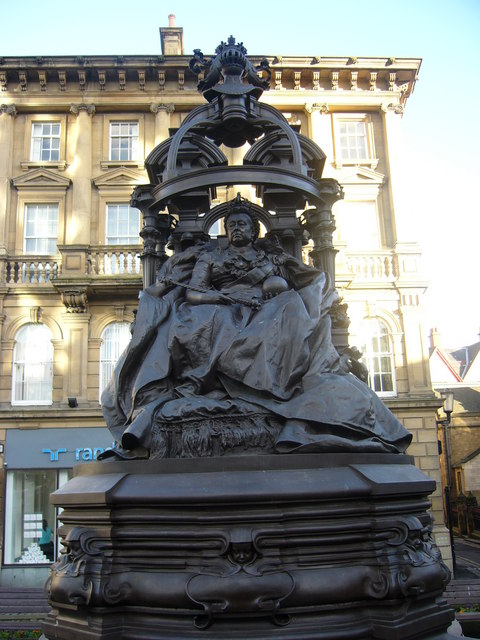
Statue of Queen Victoria donated by Stephenson to celebrate 500 years of the shrievaltie

In 1903, Stephenson gave the city a bronze statue of Queen Victoria by Alfred Gilbert, to commemorate 500 years of the office of Sheriff of Newcastle upon Tyne. It stands in St Nicholas Square, near Newcastle Cathedral in the city centre and is Grade II* listed.

== Recognition ==
Stephenson was knighted on 30 June 1900 at Windsor Castle.

In October 1910, Stephenson was awarded with Newcastle upon Tyne's Freedom of the City award.

In June 2024, Stephenson was honored with the installation of an official Commemorative Plaque, placed at the outer gates of the Throckley Hall private estate. Unveiled in a ceremony by Cllr Rob Higgins, the current Lord Mayor of Newcastle Upon Tyne, at the time, and K Blackhall, the owner of Throckley Hall and the private estate.
