= Throckley Hall =

Manor House in England

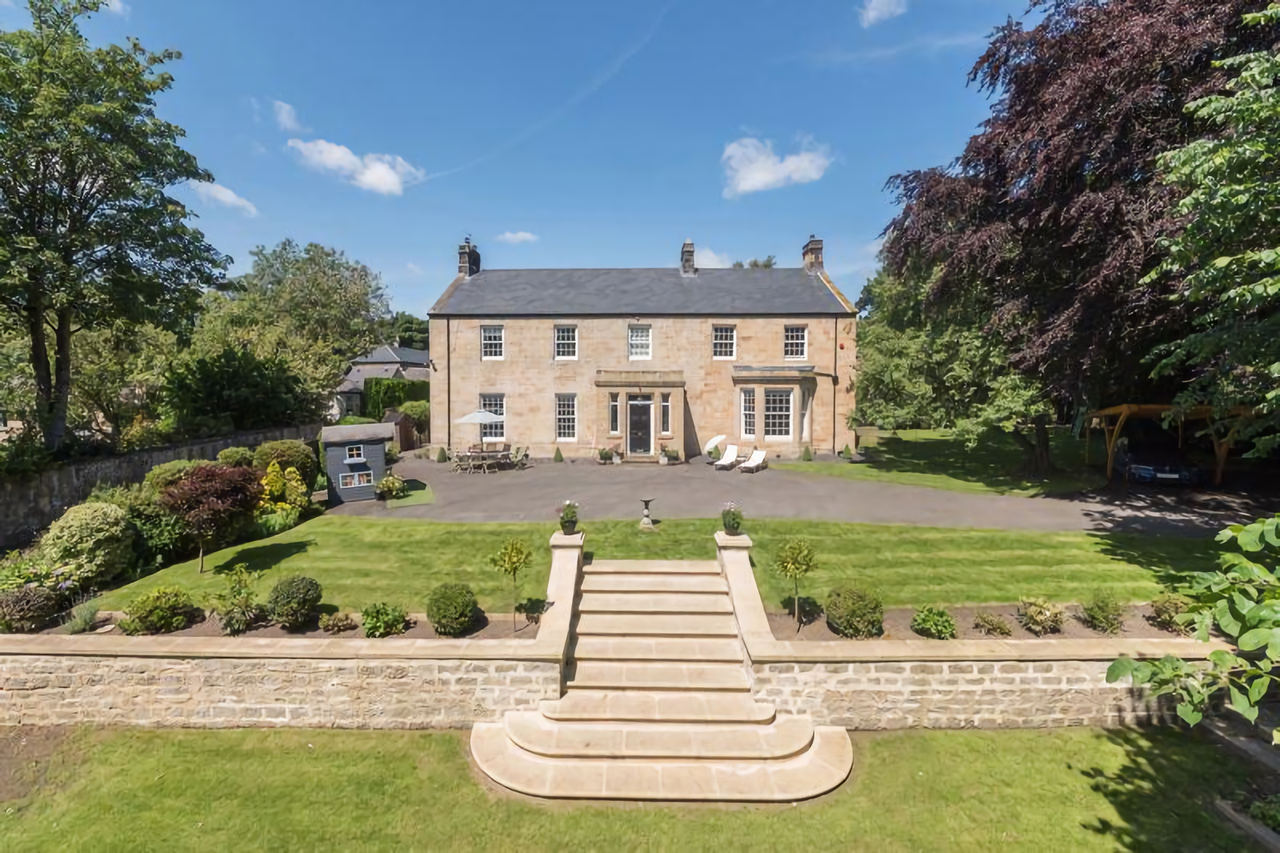
- Throckley Hall Principal Elevation, South Wing

- Location within Tyne and Wear
- 54°59′24″N 1°45′50″W
- Type: Manor House
- Periods: Georgian / Regency
- Associated with: Stephenson Family^{†} Blackhall Family^{(Current)}
- Location: Throckley, UK
- Nearest city: Newcastle Upon Tyne
- OS grid reference: NZ 15180 66254

History
- Built: 1820

Site notes
- Area: 4.8 acres (210,000 sq ft)
- Architectural style: Georgian
- Current use: Private Residence
- Owner: Blackhall Family

Throckley Hall is a privately owned 19th century manor house and gardens located about 6 miles (9 km) west of the city of Newcastle upon Tyne, within the village of Throckley. It has been privately owned throughout its history, having been originally owned by Sir William Haswell Stephenson.

== History ==
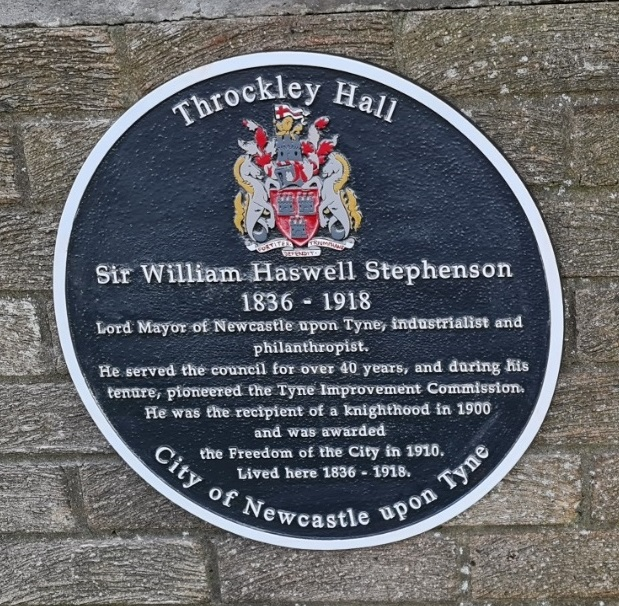
Plaque commemorating William Haswell Stephenson at Throckley Hall

The manorial estate of Throckley Hall, originally encompassed the majority of the land in the region and the village of Throckley. The industrialist, philanthropist and historical Lord Mayor of Newcastle Upon Tyne, Sir William Haswell Stephenson was born in Throckley and lived in Throckley Hall then known as Throckley House, prior to its expansion in 1850 and renaming to Throckley Hall, as it continues to this day. With Throckley having historically been a colliery village, the Stephenson family owned several coal pits and employed the majority of the local population. Sir Stephenson was Mayor of Newcastle upon Tyne in 1875, 1884, and 1894 and Lord Mayor in 1902, 1909, 1910, and 1911. The Stephenson family continued to reside in Throckley Hall following the death of Sir William. Other notable residents included Major William Ernest Stephenson, who held the rank of Major in the Northumberland Fusiliers of the British Army.

Throckley Hall was featured on Antiques Roadshow in 1987. The Hall and Estate were subsequently accuired by the Blackhall family, thereafter undergoing a degree of sympathetic restoration and was selected by Newcastle City Council's Heritage and Historic Environment Department for commemoration and award of an official plaque. Unveiled in June 2024 in a ceremony by Cllr. Robert Higgins, the current Lord Mayor of Newcastle Upon Tyne, at the time, and Dr. Kristian Blackhall, the owner of Throckley Hall and the private estate.

== Grounds and Estate ==
Throckley Hall remains a private residence along with the associated land, which include formal tiered gardens surrounding the house as well as several acres of protected woodland and meadows extending to the East and South, towards the River Tyne. The Hall itself retains many original and antique features, with original plaster mouldings in the hallways as well as the formal state rooms: drawing room and dining room.

Several footpaths including a public right of way run along the western side of the private estate, extending south to the River Tyne and West towards the neighboring village of Heddon-on-the-Wall. Throckley Hall shares several architectural and design styles with similar historical properties and land estates, including nearby Heddon Hall and Newbrough Hall, constructed at a similar time.

== See also ==
- Sir William Haswell Stephenson
- Throckley
- Newbrough Hall
