= William Snell Chauncy =

- William Snell Chauncy 1840
- Born: 11 August 1820; Addlestone, Chertsey, Surrey, England
- Died: 3 July 1878 (aged 57); Goulburn, New South Wales
- Spouse: Anna Cox
- Children: William born 1842 Adelaide; Sophia Mary, born 1844, Port Louis, Mauritius; Anne Maria Lydia born 1846 London; Theresa born 1848 London; Charles born 1851 Adelaide; Emily born 1853 Melbourne; Eva born 1855 Emerald Hill, and Philip Henry born 1860 Wodonga.
- Engineering career
- Discipline: civil engineer
- Projects: Murray river road Bridge Albury, Hobsons Bay Railway Victoria

William Snell Chauncy (11 August 1820 – 3 July 1878) was an English civil engineer responsible for a number of important engineering works including the first steam railway opened in Australia.

== Early life and work ==
William Snell Chauncy was born in Addlestone, Chertsey, Surrey, England in 1820. He married Anna Cox at St Michael & All Angels church, in Sunninghill, Berkshire on 7 July 1840. Chauncy initially worked with architect and surveyor, William Mullinger Higgins, on the design of a new grandstand for Ascot Race Course.

In 1840 Chauncy and Anna migrated to Australia on the ship the Appoline arriving on 22 November in Port Adelaide where they had family, including a half-brother Philip who as assistant surveyor of Western Australia, may have been in a position to recommend Chauncy for engineering work.

The Australian venture was short lived and Chauncy set off back to England in 1844 via South Africa, but the birth of their second child Sophia Mary on board ship, caused him to delay at the Cape of Good Hope, where he obtained work supervising the construction of 300 miles of roads and several bridges. By 1846 he had moved to Ireland and was assistant engineer of roads in County Mayo. The family, however, stayed in West London. In about 1848, William was appointed assistant engineer on the London to Dover Railway, under William Cubitt.

== Return to Australia ==
In 1849 William wrote a pamphlet for prospective emigrants to Australia, evidently based on his personal experience. Possibly connected to this was his return to Adelaide on the Duke of Wellington in the same year. The South Australian Railway Committee had commissioned W.S. Chauncy to report on a possible railway line from Adelaide, north to the copper mining town of Burra, but by the time he had completed about 84 miles of the survey, a more effective route through Port Wakefield had supplanted the northern line. However, he completed surveying the Adelaide to Port Adelaide Railway line and in 1851 surveyed a road for the Central Board of Main Roads from Hahndorf, South Australia to Wellington Ferry on the Murray River, which although officially named the South Eastern Road, is generally known as Chauncys Line.

== First Australian railway ==
In about 1851, he moved to Victoria where a gold rush boom had created new opportunities and by 1853 the family was residing at Sandridge near Melbourne. William was appointed as chief engineer of the Hobson's Bay Railway company in Melbourne, Australia preparing designs and supervising contracts for the first steam railway to operate in Australia in 1854. However, he resigned the engineership of the line under a cloud as the work he had carried out on the railway pier had proven useless. He was replaced by James Moore.

Chauncy also gave evidence to the select committee inquiring on the railway gauge in 1853 and the inquiry into roads and railways in 1854.

Around this time Chauncy also wrote another pamphlet How to Settle in Victoria using the pen name 'Rusticus'.

== Move to New South Wales ==
In 1856 William took up a position as district surveyor in Belvoir in north east Victoria (Belvoir was later changed to Wodonga). His work appears to have involved crown land surveys, including Belvoir itself, and other towns and parishes In 1861 he supervised the erection of the first road bridge over the Murray River between Wodonga and Albury, New South Wales. His sixteen-year-old daughter, Sophia had the honour of cutting the ribbon at the opening ceremony.

In 1868 Chauncy was appointed road superintendent at Goulburn, New South Wales with one of his responsibilities being improvements to the main Sydney to Melbourne Road (now the Hume Highway). He died in 1878 of gastric fever. Chauncy had evidently been very popular with his fellow officers, contractors and workman who erected a befitting monument to his honour at Goulburn Cemetery.
