= Newburn Town Hall =

Municipal building in Newburn, Tyne and Wear, England

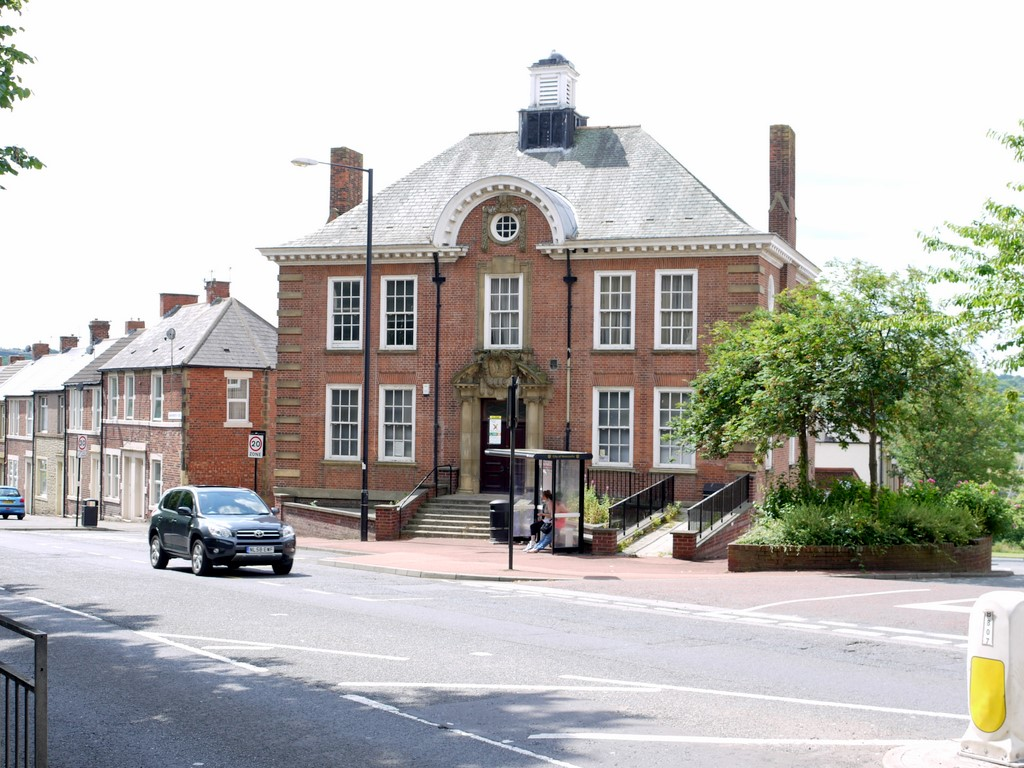
- The building in 2010

- Shown in Tyne and Wear
- 54.9844°N 1.7438°W
- Location: Newburn Road, Newburn

History
- Built: 1910

Site notes
- Architect: Edward Cratney
- Architectural style: Baroque Revival style

Listed Building – Grade II
- Official name: Housing Department Area Offices
- Designated: 29 March 1987
- Reference no.: 1186074

Newburn Town Hall is a former municipal building in Newburn Road, Newburn, a district of Newcastle upon Tyne, in Tyne and Wear, England. The building, which is currently in mixed commercial and residential use, is a Grade II listed building.

== History ==
Following significant population growth, largely associated with the mining industry, a local board of health was established in Newburn in 1893. The local board established its offices in Mosley Street in central Newcastle. After the Newburn District Local Board of Health was replaced by Newburn Urban District Council in 1894, the town clerk for the new council was initially based in the offices in Mosley Street. After finding this arrangement unsatisfactory, the new council decided to commission dedicated offices. The site they selected was open ground on the west side of Newburn Road.

The new building was designed by Edward Cratney in the Baroque Revival style, built in red brick with stone dressings and was completed in 1910. The design involved a symmetrical main frontage of five bays facing onto Newburn Road.

The building continued to serve as the headquarters of the district council for much of the 20th century, but ceased to be the local seat of government when the enlarged Newcastle City Council was formed in 1974. The building subsequently served as the area offices for Newcastle City Council's housing department, and was grade II listed in 1987.

The city council vacated the building in 2009 and it subsequently stood vacant. In March 2013, the building was sold to David and Elaine Milbourne, who converted it into a house and base for their businesses, a design consultancy practice and a dance school respectively. The transformation featured on the BBC Programme, Britain's Empty Homes, in 2014. After the work had been completed, the building was officially re-opened by the Lord Mayor of Newcastle, Linda Wright, and the local member of parliament, Catherine McKinnell, on 2 June 2017.

== Architecture ==
The building is constructed of brick, with a slate roof. It has two storeys, plus an attic and basement. It has an L-shaped plan; the front is five bays wide, while the left return is nine bays. The central bay features a central front door in an Ionic order doorcase, above which there is a cartouche of the former district council placed within a broken segmental pediment. On the first floor there is a sash window which is surmounted by a round headed pediment containing an oculus surrounded by garlands. The outer bays are also fenestrated by sash windows. At roof level, there is a square roof lantern with louvres and a dome.
