= William Brown (mining engineer) =

English mining engineer (1717-1782)

William Brown (1717–1782) – or William Brown of Throckley as he was sometimes known – was an English mining engineer, waggonway constructor and steam engine builder who played a major role in the development of the coal mining industry in the North East of England and also elsewhere in Britain and Ireland.

== Early life ==
Brown was born at Heddon Pit House, Heddon-on-the-Wall, Northumberland in 1717, the son of William Brown and Ann (or Agnes) Watson, the daughter of Lewis and Jane Watson of Throckley Pit House. William Brown senior was involved with local mines, though exactly how is uncertain. Lewis Watson died in 1732 and around then the Brown family moved the short distance from Heddon to Throckley, where they lived for the next forty or so years. William Brown senior then became the tenant of Throckley Colliery. William Brown the son worked in mines in the 1730s and 1740s, but again his activities are not known. However, he would have served his apprenticeship in the 1730s, perhaps with William Newton, for they were related through their connection to the Watsons or maybe with his father or his neighbour Richard Peck, and by the 1740s was gaining expertise in designing waggonways.

== Coal mines ==
From around 1750 Brown worked as a viewer – the man with the technical expertise to develop a colliery and then to deal with the geological and water problems inevitable in a mine. He was responsible for all the machinery, the waggonways and had to be a competent surveyor He was expected to provide financial advice to the owners and to recruit, manage and retain the workforce needed to operate the mine.

Like many viewers, Brown became a part owner of the collieries in which he worked. Besides Throckley Colliery, in which he owned a half share, Brown later had shares in both Shiremoor and its successor Willington, which were very successful and profitable enterprises.

Over the next 30 years through a combination of his mining skills, the installation of steam engines for pumping and the creation of waggonways to deliver coal to the Tyne for transport he developed a number of new mines and seams at Throckley, Heddon, Hartley, Shiremoor, Walbottle, Willington and Wallsend, though he died a few months before the latter opened.

He was one of those who helped win the High Main Seam, a six-foot seam of high quality household coal to the east of Newcastle which was at a much deeper level – around 600 feet – than the same seam to the west of the city and at one time had been thought unreachable because of the presence of water.

His work was not just with coal mines as he had involvement in Yorkshire with copper mines at Middleton Tyas, near Richmond and lead mines at Grassington and in Swaledale.

Brown was also concerned with technical developments within mines. There are claims that he was the first to introduce the screening of coals; he made attempts to mechanise the hewing process with a machine known as 'Willy Brown's Iron Man'; and he was senior viewer at Hartley Colliery when steam winding was introduced.

== Waggonways ==
Waggonways – the early railways with horses and wooden rails usually used to transport coal from mines to docks – were important to mining development. They developed into complex networks, much like the iron railways of the nineteenth century; and, like these, they made possible a massive expansion of the coal industry.

It is not known where William Brown gained his experience in waggonway construction, though the likely place was the network of waggonways leading to the staiths at Stella on the opposite bank of the River Tyne to Throckley.

Brown was involved in planning and costing many developments, though the construction was done by contractors. He was particularly active in the Throckley area. The decision to make Throckley a seasale colliery – producing coal for shipment by sea, particularly to London – justified the building of its first railway, opened in 1751. The Wylam Way – an extension to this – was opened in 1756 and there were other additions as new pits opened in the Throckley and Walbottle area over the next few years. In 1758 a waggonway to his design opened a few miles north of the Tyne estuary from Hartley Colliery to the coast.

Later in his career he was to design the important network of waggonways east of Newcastle, and others south of the Tyne such as the line from Harraton to the River Wear, those from Washington Colliery to both the Tyne and the Wear, and that from Beamish to Fatfield. In 1776 he surveyed the route for a waggonway which followed the edge of the Newcastle Town Moor to the Tyne, but it was not built.

His work was not just limited to the North East – in 1754, he was commissioned by the Duke of Hamilton to provide a waggonway underground at Bo'ness Colliery near Edinburgh.

== Steam engines ==
From about 1750 until his death in 1782 William Brown was primarily recognised as the builder of Newcomen steam engines for pumping purposes. He built engines at some 20 collieries in the Great Northern Coalfield in Northumberland and Durham, as well as in other parts of England, and in Scotland and Ireland. The first Boulton and Watt engine in the Northumberland and Durham coalfield was erected at Byker Colliery in 1778 to assist with pumping, almost certainly commissioned by Brown.

In this work he was associated with notable engineers of the eighteenth century, such as John Smeaton, James Brindley and Abraham Darby and his clients included dukes and earls as well as lesser gentry.

Brown was responsible for the introduction of larger iron cylinders, eventually as large as 75 inches in size (and 10 feet long) compared to the 42 inch cylinders in use in 1750, which made more powerful engines possible. He realised the need for a plentiful supply of steam and built multiple boilers to improve this. He also used larger pipes – the 24 inch wooden pipes for Benwell being three times the size commonly used.

He obtained materials for engines from a variety of suppliers. The brass cylinders of the early engines were probably produced locally; the larger iron cylinders used later were mainly built at Abraham Darby's foundry at Coalbrookdale. As Brown was closely associated with the Midlothian collieries in Scotland he would probably have had connections with the Carron Iron Works near Falkirk, and may have also acquired cylinders from there. The wrought iron plates for the boilers were probably produced locally by Hawks of Gateshead or Crowleys at Swalwell, then the largest iron manufactory in Europe.

== Personal life ==
Brown married Mary Smith of Morpeth in 1741. They had seven children, two of whom died in childhood. These are remembered by a plaque on the south east wall of St. Andrew's Church at Heddon on the Wall. Their eldest son, William Brown (1743 – 1812) married Margaret Dixon at Stamfordham in 1770 and the couple had eleven children including Dixon – later taking the surname Dixon too – who was High Sheriff of Northumberland in 1827.

William Brown died in February 1782 and is buried in Heddon churchyard – the family gravestone showing a coat of arms.
