= William Elsdon =

English civil engineer

- Born: c. 1829; Newburn, Northumberland, England
- Died: 10 March 1904 (aged 74–75); Melbourne, Victoria, Australia
- Spouse: Mary Ann Reid (m. 1854)
- Children: 1 (maybe more?)
- Engineering career
- Discipline: Civil engineer
- Institutions: Melbourne & Hobson's Bay Railway Company (1854–1880); Victorian Railways (1880–1882)
- Projects: St Kilda railway line, Victoria

William Elsdon (c. 1829 – 3 March 1904) was an English-Australian civil engineer. He was also an architect and railway engineer who worked predominantly on early railways in Victoria.

== Family life and education ==
William Elsdon was born c. 1829 in Newburn, near Lemington, Northumberland. In the 1851 census, he was recorded as a 21-year-old engine-wright, lodging at 6 Orchard Street, St Johns, Newcastle. His father Robert Elsdon was also an engineer living in Newburn. He was educated at local schools. He married Mary Ann Reid in 1854, at Ovingham. Mary was s daughter of William Reid (born c. 1797) of Welton, who was himself a surveying engineer, who in the 1850s was superintendent of Whittle Dene Water Works near Welton, Northamptonshire. Elsdon and his wife had at least one daughter, Cecilia, who married Edward George, youngest son of the late Douglas T. Kilburn in East Melbourne in 1889.

In c. 1888, Eldson financed the construction of Parlington, a Victorian Italianate villa in Canterbury that was his home, subsequently added to the Victorian Heritage Register.

== Career ==
In the 1850s, Elsdon commenced his professional career when he was articled to the English engineering firm of Messrs Robert Stephenson & Company. He was appointed to the Melbourne & Hobson's Bay Railway Company in Melbourne on 1 May 1854 as their chief engineer, "upon the recommendation of George Stephenson, with whom he served his time as a civil engineer at Newcastle Upon Tyne". Elsdon replaced the original engineer, James Moore, who had been considered incompetent, in December 1854. Elsdon remained in this post for 25 years and during this time he undertook the designs for the St.Kilda branch line, including three bluestone bridges built in 1857. Elsdon also carried out private practice in Melbourne designing a number of civic works including the Fitzroy Gasworks, City Abattoirs and some large public buildings. He took out a patent for the construction of rail and road carriages and improved wheel tires, and an improvement in railway crossings, adapting them to such carriages in England on 21 September 1863, and was elected as a member of the Institution of Civil Engineers on 5 April 1870.

Elsdon also undertook the works for linking the Hobson's Bay & Melbourne Suburban Railways in 1865, through construction of a tunnel under Swanston Street, and setting the location for Melbourne's main suburban railway terminus at Flinders Street Station. He also envisaged a connection with the Spencer Street station, initially supervising construction of a ground level branch line in 1879, before the Flinders Street Viaduct was built. In 1871 he took a year's absence due to over-strain in his profession and spent time visiting England and the continent. On his return he prepared a report on the progress of railways in Europe at the request of the Victorian Government.

He travelled on behalf of the Victorian Railways with Thomas Higinbotham, to England, Europe, Russia and the US to examine railway construction in these places, and reported that more economical methods could be used to advantage. This ushered in a new phase of construction of the 'light lines', with less elaborate structures, steeper grades and tighter curves to reduce the earthworks required. He was presented with an elaborate silver server set in 1869, in recognition of his contribution to railways in Victoria.

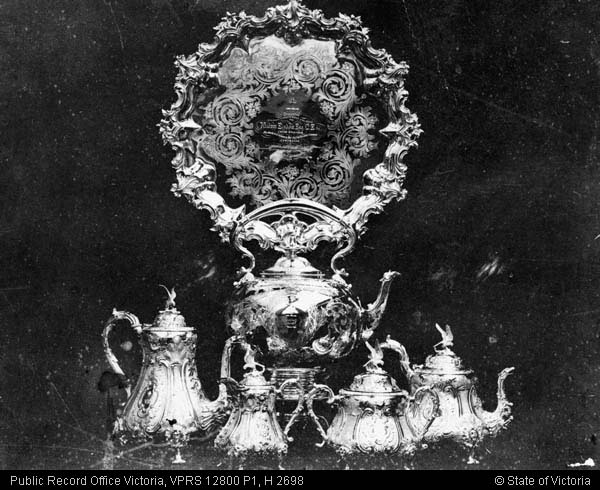
Silver presented to Elsdon on opening of Hobsons Bay line

Following the takeover of the private Hobson's Bay Railway Company by the Victorian Government railway department, Elsdon was appointed general manager and Engineer-in-Chief of the Victorian Railways on the sudden death of Higginbotham in 1880. During this time he prepared designs for Rosedale station in Gippsland. Elsdon subsequently retired in 1882 on political grounds during a period of turmoil with the former Engineer-in-Chief Robert Watson being reinstated. Elsdon then became involved in coal-mining in Newcastle, New South Wales, served on several Royal Commissions, filled the role of acting City Surveyor for the City of Melbourne for three years.

Elsdon died in Melbourne on 3 March 1904, aged 74 years.
