= James Moore (engineer) =

- Born: 1826; England
- Died: 19 November 1887 (aged 60–61); Lismore, New South Wales
- Engineering career
- Discipline: civil engineer
- Projects: Hobson's Bay railway line, Victoria

James Moore (1826–1887) was an engineer responsible for the first steam-powered railway to operate in Australia.

== Early life ==
James Moore was born in 1826 in England. He was a nephew of Sir William Cubitt, under whom he was engaged on the South Eastern and Great Northern railways and probably learnt his trade there. In due course he qualified as a Chartered Engineer. He moved to Australia in the early 1850s.

== Melbourne and Hobson's Bay Railway Company ==
In March 1854, Moore was appointed as Chief Engineer of the Melbourne and Hobson's Bay Railway Company which, six months later, opened the first steam-powered railway in Australia. It was reported that he was a man "of whose abilities rumour speaks favourably". He succeeded William Snell Chauncy, who had resigned the engineership of the line under a cloud as the work on the railway pier had proven useless. Moore was responsible for completing the railway line between the city and Sandridge, and the main deep-water pier on Hobson's Bay at Sandridge. He can also be credited with the first locomotive in the Australian colonies when he attached a pile driving steam engine to one of the heavy railway trucks, to assist in construction of the line.

At the opening of the line in September 1854, he was presented with an engraved watch with the inscription: "James Moore, Esq. Engineer of the Melbourne & Hobson's Bay Railway by the Commissioners as a token of their esteem and in commemoration of his having opened the first Railway in the Australian Colonies Sept. 12th 1854". However, not long after this he was replaced on 12 December 1854, by William Elsdon, possibly due to some perceived incompetence.

== Later career ==
Little is known of Moore's later career. However, he was described as being a civil engineer of the Railway Department in Sydney for many years; one specific role was superintending civil engineering works on the southern extension of the New South Wales Great Southern Railway into the town of Goulburn, the contractors having failed to fulfil their obligations concerning securities. He was also noted as having been resident engineer of the Windsor and Richmond Railway.

Moore established a sugar plantation from about 1870 at a property he called "Jesswoolgan", near Alstonville, about 16 kilometres (10 miles) east of Lismore. After more than a decade he experienced heavy losses and moved into Lismore, becoming the Town Engineer. In March 1886 an alderman gave notice of a motion to dispense with his services, but when considered by the council on 29 March the motion was lost on the casting vote of the mayor. He resigned 18 days later, on 15 April, citing ill health.

== Death ==
James Moore died at his home in South Lismore on 19 November 1887 of diabetes, leaving a wife and adult children. He was interred at the Church of England Cemetery at Wilson's Ridges, Lismore. His death notice described him as "...one who was always kind and affable, and whose hand was ever stretched forth to assist the needy or distressed."

== Bibliography ==
- Cumming, D.A. Some Public Works Engineers in Victoria in the Nineteenth Century Technology Report No. TR-85/10. August 1985.
- Lee, Robert. The Railways of Victoria 1854–2004 Melbourne University Publishing Ltd, ISBN 9780522851342.
- Harrigan, Leo J. (1962). Victorian Railways to '62. Public Relations and Betterment Board. p. 274.
