= Norman Smith (footballer, born September 1897) =

English footballer

Personal information
- Date of birth: 20 September 1897
- Place of birth: Newburn, England
- Date of death: 1978 (aged 80–81)
- Height: 5 ft 7 in (1.70 m)
- Position: Right-back

Senior career*
Years	Team	Apps	(Gls)
- Wadworth Colliery
1921–1922	Tottenham Hotspur	0	(0)
1922–1936	Charlton Athletic	417	(16)
1937–1939	Queens Park Rangers	68	(2)
1939–1940	Chelsea	0	(0)
- * Club domestic league appearances and goals

Norman Smith (20 September 1897 – 1978) was an English footballer who played as a right-back in the Football League for Charlton Athletic and Queens Park Rangers.
