= Guildhall, Newcastle upon Tyne =

Municipal building in Newcastle upon Tyne, Tyne and Wear, England

The Guildhall
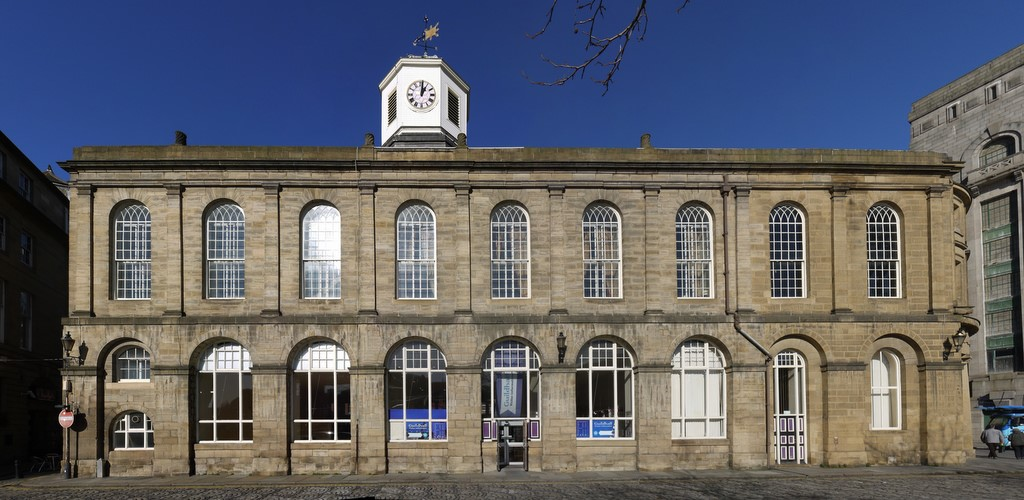

- Location within Tyne and Wear
- 54.96842°N 1.60767°W
- Location: Sandhill, Newcastle upon Tyne NE1 3AF

History
- Built: 1655

Site notes
- Architect: Robert Trollope
- Architectural style: Classical style

Listed Building – Grade I
- Designated: 14 June 1954
- Reference no.: 1120877

The Guildhall is an important historic civic building in the centre of Newcastle upon Tyne. It is a Grade I listed building.

== History ==
The original guildhall, which was commissioned by Roger Thornton, was completed in the early 15th century and had to be demolished after being badly damaged in a fire in 1639.

The new building was designed by Robert Trollope and completed in 1655. Following a poor harvest, the building was attacked by a crowd of 3,000 angry and hungry local people during a riot on 26 June 1740. Fine woodworks, paintings and court records were destroyed and at least one protestor was shot and killed by the military authorities. Five of the alleged ringleaders of the riot were sentenced to seven years of transportation.

By the early 19th century both the north and south elevations had been re-fronted in the classical style. The north elevation, which was re-fronted to the designs of William Newton and David Stephenson in 1794, was given a Palladian style entrance with four Ionic order columns on the first floor. Meanwhile, the south elevation which was re-fronted to the designs of John and William Stokoe in 1809, was given arcading on the ground floor and a Doric order frontage on the first floor.

The old Maison de Dieu, which had been completed by Roger Thornton in 1412, was demolished to make way to an eastern extension to the guildhall to the designs by John Dobson in 1823. The mayor and sheriff were allowed to hold the borough courts in the building and it was also the meeting place of Newcastle Town Council until 1863 when the council re-located to larger facilities at Newcastle Town Hall in St Nicholas Square.

The interior of the building features a main hall which is 92 feet (28 m) long and 30 feet (9.1 m) wide and has an oak ceiling. The "Merchant Venturers' Court" where travellers, sailing in or out of the River Tyne, would meet, contains a large 17th century chimney piece, some fine oak carvings and some religious decorations, while the mayor's parlour is panelled and decorated with local scenes.

The guildhall contains a number of paintings by George Bouchier Richardson (1822–1877) of local scenes, including the Entrance to the Side, the Pandon Gate, the old Tyne Bridge, the old Maison de Dieu and the old Exchange.

The building has housed the Newcastle branch of the Hard Rock Cafe since the summer of 2021. Guided tours are also available, but must to be booked online in advance.

== See also ==
- Guild
- Guildhall
