= Newburn Steelworks =

Newburn Steelworks was a large steel mill on the banks of the River Tyne at Newburn, near Newcastle upon Tyne, North East England.

== History ==
John Spencer originally opened the works in Newburn in 1822, in a water driven mill on the Dewley Burn which he converted for file grinding. In 1867 Spencer was involved in the formation of the Throckley Coal Company (TCC). The TCC's Isabella colliery in Throckley provided coal for a set of coke ovens also owned by the TCC, whose main customer was Spencer's steel works.

Although the works were initially used to make springs for the railway industry, Newburn Steelworks quickly grew to become one of the most advanced steel mills in the country with the booming of the shipbuilding industry on Tyneside at the beginning of the 20th century. The works had expanded so much by 1895 that Newburn Hall, originally a fifteenth-century pele tower, was embedded within it. In 1904, the works made the steel plate for the RMS Mauretania, the most famous liner ever built on Tyneside. The steel works, along with mining and railway industries, brought great prosperity to Newburn. The works employed 1,500 people, and provided steel plates and springs, amongst other products, for the railway, shipping, armaments and mining industries all over the world. However, the works fell into decline in the depression following World War I, with the demand for steel falling. The works were closed in 1926 and demolished in 1933.

Despite the demise of the steelworks, the company continued as John Spencer and Sons and produced railway axle and springs, as well as gun springs and barrels for World War II. The company eventually folded in the 1960s. A number of buildings associated with the steelworks still stand in the Newburn area.

== Haematite Iron Company ==
The Tyne Iron Works was established in Lemington in 1797. In 1869, John Spencer & Sons took the works over, renaming it the Tyne Haematite Iron Company when it reopened in 1871. The works then used imported Spanish ore, rather than locally mined ore. The works closed in 1886, and in 1903 the Newcastle and District Electric Lighting Company erected Lemington Power Station on its site.

== Newburn power station ==
In 1902 the Newcastle and District Electric Lighting Company extended its supply area to include Newburn. In 1908 they opened a power station next to the steel mill. The station generated electricity using waste heat in the form of steam available from the mill's reciprocating engines. Initially the station used only a single 750 kilowatt (kW) Parsons exhaust steam turbo-alternator, but the plant was extended in 1915 with the addition of a single 2,000 kW Parsons turbo alternator, which as well as being powered by exhaust steam could be supplemented by two 20,000 lb/h boilers. The commissioning of this extension ushered the closure of Lemington Power Station in 1919. Following the closure of the steel works in 1924 the station's plant was no longer used and the change over in the grid system to 50 cycles rendered the station useless, forcing its complete closure and dismantling.
