= Netherwitton =

Village in Northumberland, England

Coordinates: 55.209°N 1.837°W

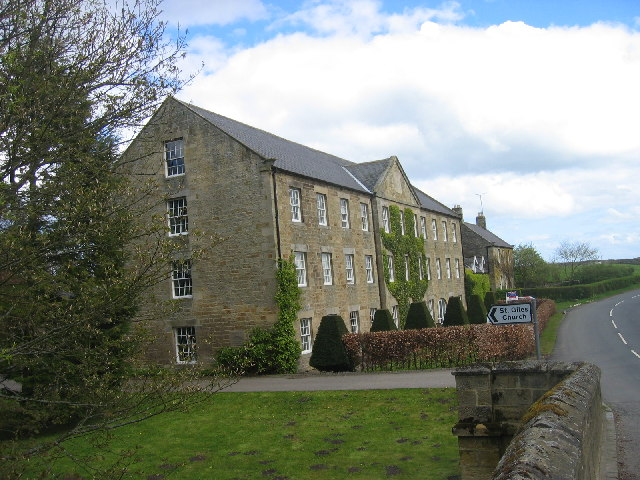

- Location within Northumberland
- Population: 272 (2001 census)
- OS grid reference: NZ105905
- Unitary authority: Northumberland
- Ceremonial county: Northumberland
- Region: North East
- Country: England
- Sovereign state: United Kingdom
- Post town: MORPETH
- Postcode district: NE61
- Dialling code: 01670
- Police: Northumbria
- Fire: Northumberland
- Ambulance: North East
- UK Parliament: Berwick upon Tweed

Netherwitton is a village in Northumberland, England about 8 miles (13 km) west north west of Morpeth.

A former cotton-mill now converted into residential housing, the old village school also converted into a house, an old bridge, a small church, and a number of cottages and gardens comprise the village. The old cross, dated 1698, still stands in a garden beyond the green. The village cross in Netherwitton is dated 1698 and seems to have been moved there when the village was moved. The original site is now parkland. The cross stands 1.6m high and was repaired in 1825. Most of the common about it has been appropriated and planted with trees.

== History ==
During the Civil War, Cromwell quartered a large force in the grounds of the stately Netherwitton Hall for one night, and later awarded a sum of £95-5s-6d. as compensation for the damage done by his troops. After Culloden in 1746 Lord Lovat, a Jacobite leader, for a long while lay concealed in a "Priest's Hole" in an upper room of the Hall. Roger Thornton, a great merchant-prince of Newcastle at the beginning of the 15th century, was a native of Netherwitton and built a castle by the river, but no trace of it remains.

== Landmarks ==
The Devil's Causeway passes the village less than 1 mile (2 km) to the east. The causeway is a Roman road which starts at Port Gate on Hadrian's Wall, north of Corbridge, and extends 55 miles (89 km) northwards across Northumberland to the mouth of the River Tweed at Berwick-upon-Tweed.

Devils Causeway Tower, Netherwitton, also known as, or recorded in historical documents as Highbush Wood. King writes ‘Marked on some OS maps as tower but now considered to be remains of cottage.’ SMR still records as ‘site of tower’. Long records as ‘remains of an irregular shaped tower.’ This site has been described as a Pele Tower. The confidence that this site is a medieval fortification or palace is Questionable.

Netherwitton Hall is a Grade I listed building. There has been a house on the site since the 14th century. The present house, which was built in about 1685, to a design by architect Robert Trollope, has an impressive three-storey, seven-bayed frontage with balustrade and unusual irregular window pediments. The rear presents some earlier features including a stairway tower which may contain remnants of ancient fortifications. The gardens contain a folly and masonry features.

== Religious sites ==
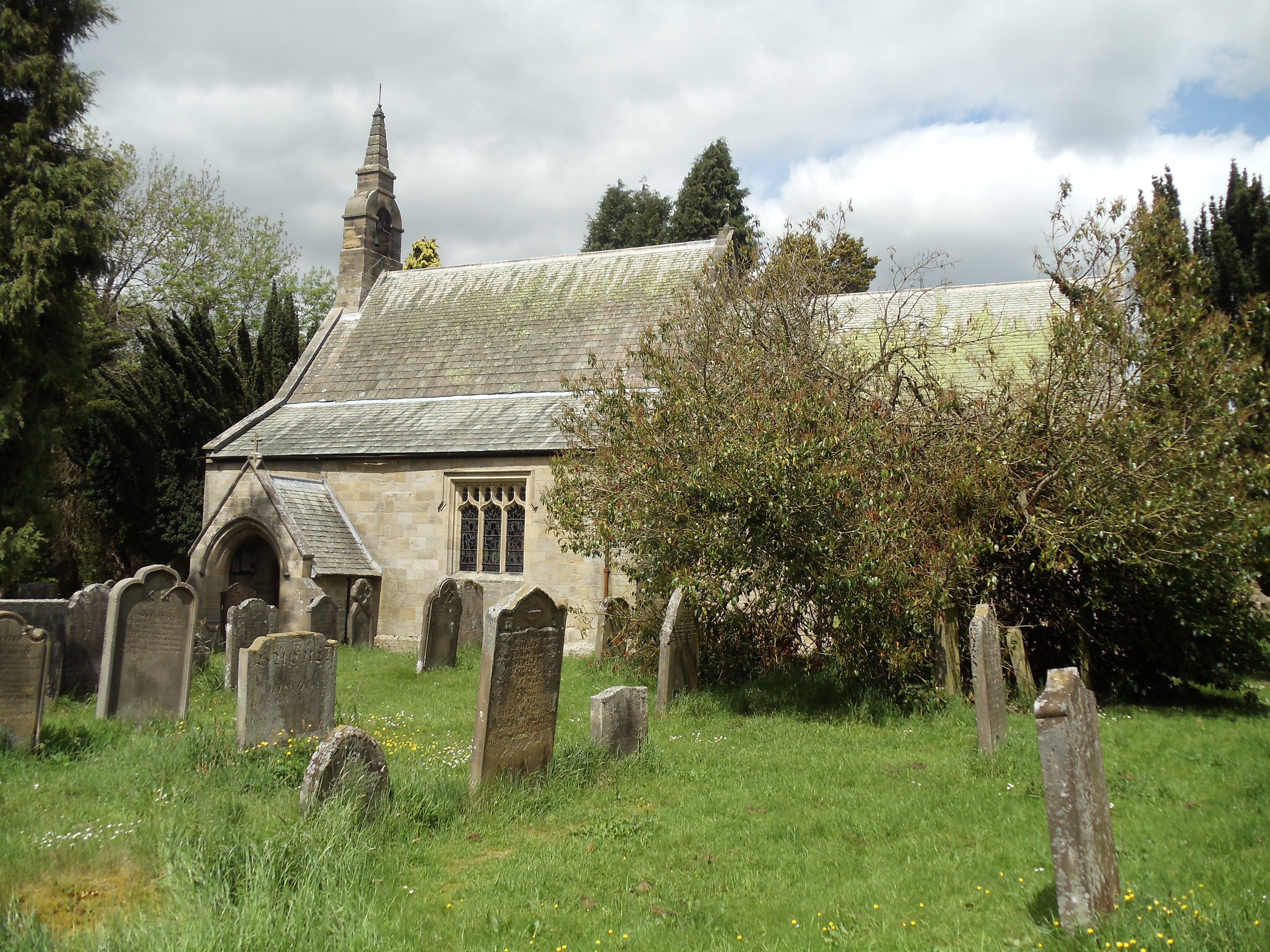
Church of St Giles

The church is dedicated to St Giles. He is the saint referred to as "Saint Aegidius" in one of the stained glass windows in the church, 'Aegidius' being the Latin form of the name 'Giles'.

Isabella Beetham, who was then named Robinson, was christened here in 1754. She went on to be a successful silhouette artist in London.
