= Robert Trollope =

English architect

Robert Trollope (died 1686) was a 17th-century English architect, born in Yorkshire, who worked mainly in Northumberland and Durham.

In 1657, Robert Trollope was awarded the freedom of the corporation of Newcastle upon Tyne. In 1668, he designed Capheaton Hall for Sir John Swinburne, 1st baronet. In 1676 he designed the remodelling of Callaly Castle. In 1677, Henry Trollope, a mason, and brother of Robert, died.

His work includes:

- Eshott Hall, about 1660
- Capheaton Hall, 1668
- Cliffords Fort, North Shields, 1672
- Callaly Castle, 1676
- St Hilda's Church, South Shields, 1675
- Guildhall, Newcastle upon Tyne
- Netherwitton Hall, 1685

He was buried at St Mary's Church, Gateshead, Co Durham. He designed his own monument complete with statue and an inscription which is said to have read:

Here lies Robert Trollop
Who made yon stones roll up
When death took his soul up
His body filled this hole up

== Sources ==
- Allsopp, Bruce; Clark, Ursula (1969). Historic Architecture of Northumberland. Newcastle upon Tyne: Oriel Press. ISBN 0 85362 062 8.
