= William Cubitt =

British civil engineer (1785–1861)

Sir William Cubitt
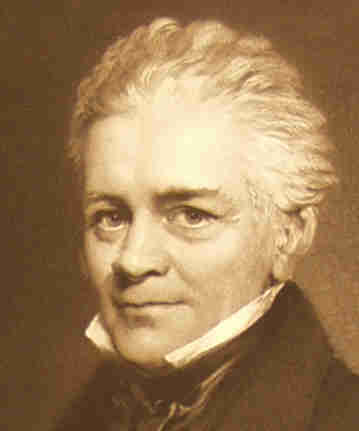
- Born: Dilham, Norfolk, England
- Baptised: 9 October 1785
- Died: 13 October 1861 (aged 76); Clapham Common, London, England
- Children: 4, including Joseph Cubitt
- Engineering career
- Discipline: Civil engineer, Millwright
- Institutions: Institution of Civil Engineers (president)
- Projects: The Crystal Palace; Welwyn Viaduct
- Significant design: Patent sails for windmills Prison treadwheels

Sir William Cubitt FRS (bapt. 9 October 1785 – 13 October 1861) was an English civil engineer and millwright. Born in Norfolk, England, he was employed in many of the great engineering undertakings of his time. He invented a type of windmill sail and the prison treadwheel, and was employed as chief engineer, at Ransomes of Ipswich, before moving to London. He worked on canals, docks, and railways, including the South Eastern Railway and the Great Northern Railway. He was the chief engineer of Crystal Palace erected at Hyde Park in 1851.

He was president of the Institution of Civil Engineers between 1850 and 1851.

== Early life ==
Cubitt was born in Dilham, Norfolk, the son of Joseph Cubitt of Bacton Wood, a miller, and Hannah Lubbock. He attended the village school. His father moved to Southrepps, and William at an early age was employed in the mill, but in 1800 was apprenticed to James Lyon, a cabinet-maker at Stalham, from whom he parted after four years. At Bacton Wood Mills he again worked with his father in 1804, and also constructed a machine for splitting hides. He then joined an agricultural machine maker named Cook, at Swanton, where they constructed horse threshing machines and other implements.

== Engineer and inventor ==
Cubitt became known for the accuracy and finish of his patterns for the iron castings of machines. Self-regulating windmill sails were invented and patented by him in 1807, at which period he settled at Horning, Norfolk, in business as a millwright. He in 1812 sought and obtained an engagement in the works of Messrs. Ransome of Ipswich, where he soon became the chief engineer. For nine years he held this situation, and then became a partner in the firm, a position which he held until he moved to London in 1826.

Already Cubitt was concerned with the employment of criminals; and for the purpose of using their labour he invented the treadmill, with the object, for example, of grinding corn, and not at first contemplating the use of the machine as a means of punishment. This invention was brought out about 1818, and was immediately adopted in the major gaols of the United Kingdom. From 1814 Cubitt had been acting as a civil engineer, and after his move to London he was fully engaged in important works. He was extensively employed in canal engineering, and the Oxford canal and the Liverpool Junction canal are among his works under this head. The improvement of the River Severn was carried out by him, and he made a series of reports on rivers. In 1841 he designed a new wharf on the Regent's Canal at Camden in London to allow transhipment of goods between the canal, road and railway. The Bute docks at Cardiff, the Middlesbrough docks and the coal drops on the Tees, and the Black Sluice drainage were undertakings which he successfully accomplished.

== Railway man ==
After the introduction of railways Cubitt's evidence was sought in parliamentary contests. As engineer-in-chief he constructed the South Eastern Railway: he adopted the scheme of employing a monster charge of 18,000 lb. of gunpowder for blowing down the face of Round Down Cliff, between Folkestone and Dover (26 January 1843), and then constructing the line of railway along the beach, with a tunnel beneath the Shakespeare Cliff. On the Croydon Railway the atmospheric system was tried by him.

On the Great Northern, to which Cubitt was the consulting engineer, he introduced the latest innovations. The Hanoverian government asked his advice on the subject of the harbour and docks at Harburg. The works for supplying Berlin with water were carried out under his direction; and he was surveyor for the Paris and Lyon railway.

On the completion of the railway to Folkestone, and the establishment of a line of steamers to Boulogne, he superintended the improvement of the port there, and then became the consulting engineer to the Boulogne and Amiens railway. Among his last works were the two large landing-stages at Liverpool, and the bridge for carrying the London turnpike road across the River Medway at Rochester, Kent.

Cubitt joined the Institution of Civil Engineers as a member in 1823, became a member of council in 1831, vice-president in 1836, and held the post of president in 1850 and 1851. While president in 1851 he had major responsibility for the erection of the Great Exhibition building in Hyde Park. At the expiration of his services he was knighted by the queen at Windsor Castle on 23 December 1851. He became a Fellow of the Royal Society on 1 April 1830, and was also a fellow of the Royal Irish Academy, and a member of other learned societies.

One of Cubitt's nephews and his protégé on the South Eastern and Great Northern railways, James Moore C. E., was appointed Chief Engineer for the Hobson's Bay Railway company and designed the first commercial steam railway in Melbourne. Moore replaced another of Cubitt's assistants, William Snell Chauncy.

== Later life ==
Cubitt retired from business in 1858, and died at his residence on Clapham Common, Surrey, on 13 October 1861, and was buried in Norwood cemetery on 18 October.

== Family ==
Cubitt was born at Dilham, Norfolk, on 9 October 1785. His father was Joseph Cubitt (1760–1829), a miller, and his mother was Hannah Lubock (1765–1831). He had two brothers, Benjamin and Joseph.

=== First marriage ===
Cubitt married Abigail Sparkhall (1785–1813) on 26 June 1809. The couple had one son, Joseph, and two daughters. Joseph Cubitt (1811–1872) became a civil engineer.

=== Second marriage ===
Cubitt married Elizabeth Jane Tiley (1791–1863) on 24 January 1821. The couple had a son, William, born 1830.

Elizabeth Jane Cubitt survived her husband and died in St George Hanover Square in February 1863.

== Structures ==
Extant structures by Cubitt include:

- Many windmills in East Anglia and Lincolnshire
- Iron bridges: Brent Eleigh and Clare, and the Stoke Bridge at Ipswich (Suffolk); Witham (Essex).
- Port Offices, Lowestoft
- Haddiscoe Cut
- Oxford Canal at Rugby and at Newbold tunnel
- Shropshire Union Canal at Shelmore Embankment
- Diglis Lock on the River Severn at Worcester
- Foord Viaduct (1844), Folkestone
- Folkestone Warren and Martello, Abbot's Cliff, Shakespeare and Martello tunnels
- Welwyn Viaduct
- Nene Bridge, Peterborough
- Museum of Childhood, Bethnal Green

Cubitt also constructed Penton Lodge, which is located in Penton Mewsey.

== See also ==
- Penal treadmill

Professional and academic associations
Preceded by Joshua Field	President of the Institution of Civil Engineers; December 1849 – December 1851	Succeeded by James Meadows Rendel
