= Close Power Station =

Coal-fired power station in England

- Country: United Kingdom
- Location: Newcastle upon Tyne
- Coordinates: 54.9656°N 1.6144°W
- Status: Decommissioned
- Commission date: 1902
- Decommission date: 1948
- Owner: Newcastle and District Electric Lighting Company

Thermal power station
- Primary fuel: Coal

Power generation
- Units decommissioned: 4
- Nameplate capacity: 5 MW

External links
- Commons: Related media on Commons

Close Power Station was a coal-fired power station situated on Newcastle upon Tyne's Quayside, in modern Tyne and Wear. The station was built by the Newcastle and District Electric Lighting Company in 1902, near their Forth Banks Power Station.

== Specification and operation ==
The station was of a steel frame and brick clad construction with the boiler house and turbine hall built alongside each other, a modern design at the time. The station had no rail sidings and so instead coal was brought to it by cart from the colliery. Coal was also delivered by barge, via a nearby boat landing on the River Tyne. The coal-fired five Stirling boilers, each with 600 HP capacity. Two further boilers were installed in 1907. Coal was fed into the boilers by overhead hoppers, which used automatic stokers. Conveyor belts were used to transport coal to the boilers, and to take ash away from them.

The station initially used one Parsons steam turbine to drive two 500 kilowatt (kW) dynamos, giving the station a total generating capacity of 1,000 kW. However, by 1907 the station had been extended to generate using two DC Parsons 1,500 kW sets, fitted with vacuum augmenters, and a further two 1,000 kW generators. This gave the station a total generating capacity of 5,000 kW. Condensing water was pumped directly from the River Tyne, which it was situated upon.

1,540 customers would come to the power station's shops to have their meters tested and repaired.

== History ==
The station was built after the neighbouring Forth Banks Power Station required frequent expansion, as demand grew. It was built on a large adjacent piece of land. During the Second World War there was a suspected unexploded bomb found in a coal dump at the station, however it was discredited. The station continued operating until roughly 1948, when the UK's electrical supply industry was nationalised. The station has since been demolished, and an electric substation now stands on the site.
