= Newburn =

Coordinates: 54°58′58″N 1°44′34″W

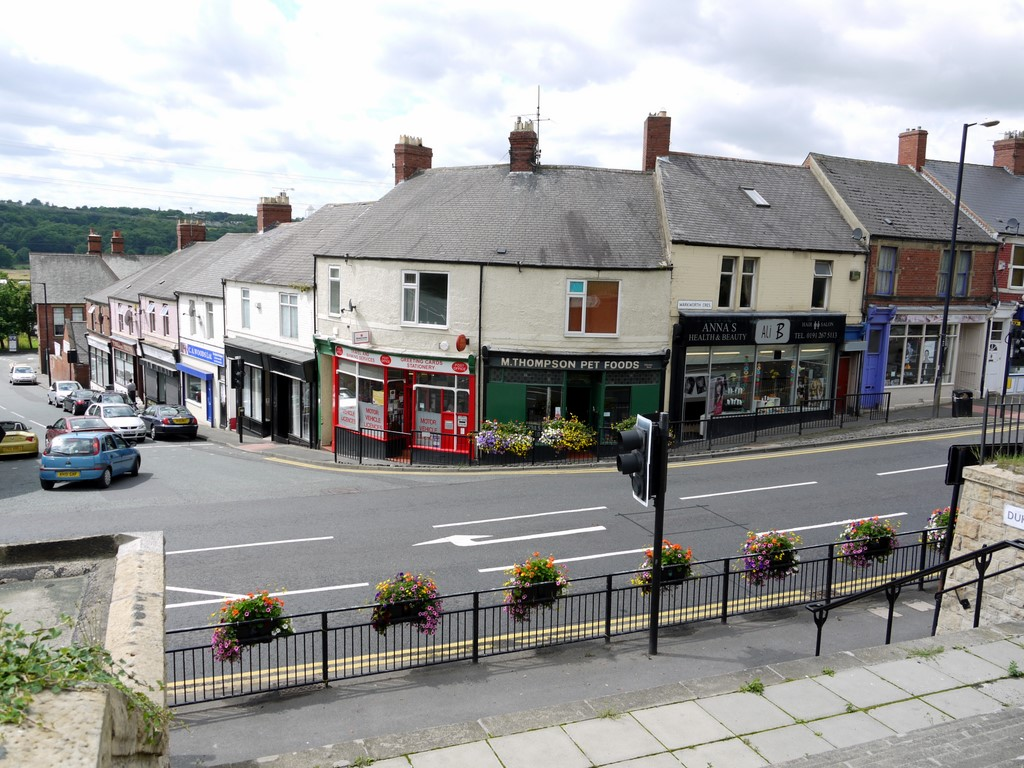
- Station Road, Newburn

- Population: 9,536 (2011 Ward)
- OS grid reference: NZ1665
- Metropolitan borough: Newcastle upon Tyne
- Metropolitan county: Tyne and Wear
- Region: North East
- Country: England
- Sovereign state: United Kingdom
- Post town: NEWCASTLE UPON TYNE
- Postcode district: NE15
- Dialling code: 0191
- Police: Northumbria
- Fire: Tyne and Wear
- Ambulance: North East
- UK Parliament: Hexham

Newburn, also known as Newburn-upon-Tyne, is a village and district of Newcastle upon Tyne, in Tyne and Wear, England. Situated on the North bank of the River Tyne, it is built rising up the valley from the river. It is situated approximately 5 miles (8 km) from the city centre, 14 miles (23 km) east of Hexham and 13 miles (21 km) south south west of Morpeth. In the 2001 census, the population was given as 9,301, increasing to 9,536 at the 2011 Census. Newburn is in the Newcastle upon Tyne district of Tyne and Wear and is part of the parliamentary constituency of Newcastle upon Tyne North.

Historically, the area was larger than Newcastle upon Tyne as it was the most eastern fordable point of the River Tyne. The area has Roman remains, and a Norman church dating from 1070 AD. In 1640, the Battle of Newburn took place. The area grew with the Industrial Revolution with the discovery of coal, and in 1822 Spencer's Steelworks was opened. The village's steelworks fell into decline after the First World War, and the area is now home to a country park and various leisure facilities.

== History ==
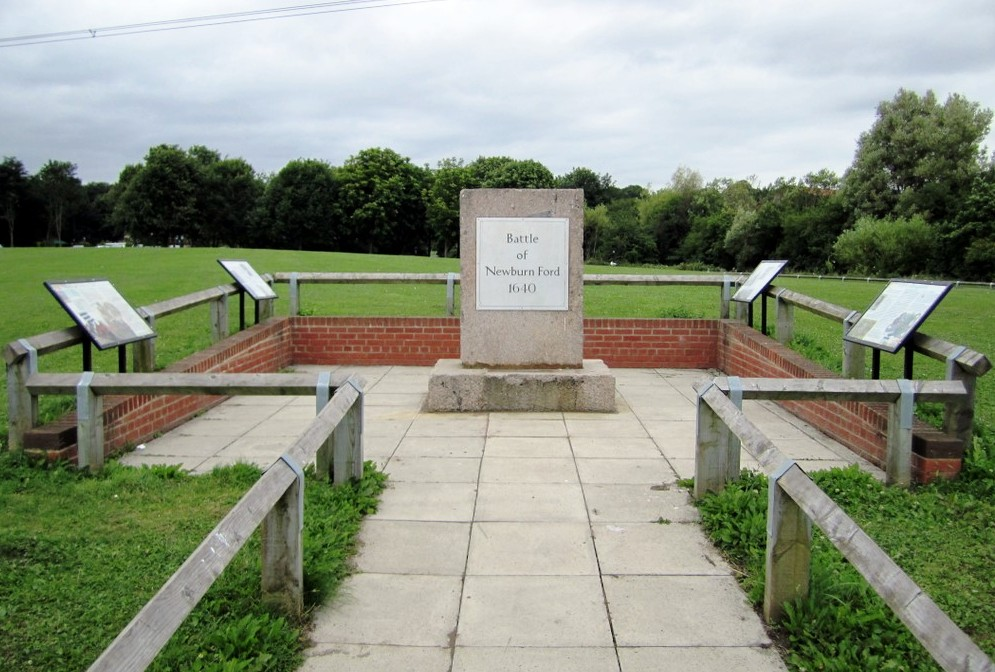
A monument commemorating the Battle of Newburn in 1640, at Newburn Country Park

Though some claim the area's name comes from the Old English for "New Fort or Castle" (burh or burg being the Old English for fort or castle), the name is more commonly thought to have come from the Dewley or New Burn, which runs through the area. This is somewhat substantiated by the fact that the settlement was recorded as Neuburna in 1121, rather than Neuburh.

Newburn was originally considered to have pre-eminence over Newcastle, as Newburn was the first point up from the mouth of the river that was fordable. The Romans marked this ford with a framework of stones, and may have built a fort to command the crossing. The area has other Roman connections, with the route of Hadrian's Wall cutting across its northern half, before running toward Throckley. From the eighth century, Newburn was a royal vill or town, and Newcastle didn't become a more important settlement until Plantagenet times.

Between 1332 and 1974 the Percy family were associated with Newburn, and Hugh Percy was the last to inherit Newburn Manor House, which was built in the 16th century. Also in the area at this time was Newburn Hall, which was built in the 15th century.

On 28 August 1640, the Battle of Newburn took place. The Scottish Covenanters, led by Alexander Leslie, 1st Earl of Leven, planted guns at Newburn to protect them while fording the river, after which they defeated the English on the south side of the river at Stellahaugh, and subsequently occupied Newcastle upon Tyne. The Scottish claim this occupation to have been the prologue to the English Civil War. The name of Scotswood, one of the manufacturing areas between Newburn and the city centre, commemorates one of their positions.

Newburn and nearby Lemington had always been considered among the greenest areas of Newcastle, and in the eighteenth and nineteenth centuries, the majority of vegetables supplied to local markets came from Newburn and Hexham. Prior to the early 19th century, the majority of employment in the Newburn area was for fishermen, keelmen and miners.

The district has many associations with the early development of the railway. The famous engineer George Stephenson, who was born in Wylam a few miles to the west of Newburn, was twice married in Newburn Church, though he is buried in Chesterfield in Derbyshire, and worked in the Water Row pit in Newburn. The area is also the birthplace of an earlier steam pioneer William Hedley, whose first locomotive Puffing Billy was built in 1812, two years prior to his rival's first locomotive Blücher. A gravestone in Newburn churchyard marks Hedley's burial in 1843. The future railway engineers Joseph and George Armstrong both lived in the village from 1824, and found their first employment at nearby Walbottle Colliery.

In 1855, William Whellan's History, Topography, and Directory of Northumberland described the banks of the Tyne at this point having extensive iron works, coal staithes, brickyards, chemical works and other manufactories.

In 1822 John Spencer established Newburn Steelworks in a small mill for grinding files, on the Dewley Burn in the north of Newburn. Over the course of next hundred or so years his mill grew to take over much of Newburn as the demand for steel boomed with the growth of railways and other industries. By the late 19th century, the works had spread to the east of the area along the banks of the Tyne to such an extent Newburn Hall was "embedded" in them. In 1916 the mill had a weekly output of 1,500 tons. Steel plates for the liner RMS Mauretania were made by Spencers. However the industry was hit hard by the depression after the First World War and the steel works closed between 1924 and 1926, despite a large effort to raise £75,000 needed to save the works. The works' large number of 130-foot (40 m) high chimneys were demolished in 1933. A number of buildings connected with the works still stand today, although with new uses, including two large sheds which are now owned by H. Pringle, used as a large indoor scrapyard, and offices which are now used by the Multi-Lab company.

In the 1850s, the Newburn Brickworks was built as part of the North Wallbottle and Blucher Colliery Company. The works were situated near Spencer's early mill in the north of Newburn. It was connected to the colliery at Blucher by a small railway, which continued onto the staithes at Lemington. Newburn bricks were mainly used for industrial buildings such as sewers, tunnels and arches. The works closed in 1965 and demolished in 1979 to make way for a council-run recycling centre. Its sister plant, Throckley Brick Works, still operates.

In the early twentieth century, around 4,000 people lived in the area. A working men's club was built, with a library, reading rooms and lecture rooms for community meetings. By 1925 the building was used as a dole office, and in 1990 adapted for use as a residential care home.

In 1922, Newburn U.D.C. High Street Fire Station was built. The building still stands today, but the Tyne and Wear Fire and Rescue Service moved to West Denton in December 1980.

== Governance ==
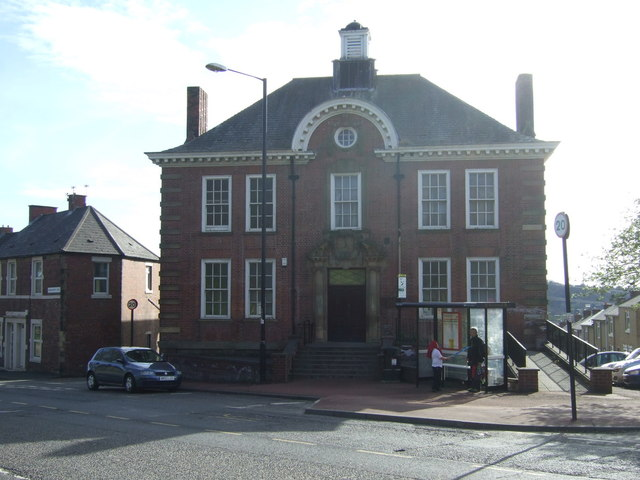
Newburn Town Hall

In 1894, Newburn Urban District Council was formed. This governed Newburn, along with other suburbs to the west of Newcastle. In 1911, the district council offices were officially opened. On 1 April 1974, following the Local Government Act 1972, it became part of the metropolitan borough of Newcastle upon Tyne in the metropolitan county of Tyne and Wear. The area is now part of the parliamentary constituency of Newcastle upon Tyne North.

== Demography ==
According to the United Kingdom Census 2001, the population of the Newburn ward was 9,301, making up 3.6% of the population of the Newcastle upon Tyne area.

== Economy ==
Prior to its closure, Spencer's Steel Works was a major local employer. Newburn Industrial Park, and the Newburn Riverside business park are now two of the key local employers.

== Culture and Community ==
In the late nineteenth century there was a funfair, known as Newburn Hoppings, set up near the area. This was similar to The Hoppings on Newcastle's Town Moor.

There was a wooden picturedrome on Westmacott Street in the early twentieth century. On 18 October 1911, the Imperial Cinema on Station Road opened. Designed by Thomas Eltringham of Throckley colliery, it originally had seating for 550. A 131-seat gallery was added later. By 1919, the cinema was doing so well, two shows a night could not satisfy demand. However, with the opening of the Lyric Cinema in Throckley in 1935, the cinema's audience was divided. Despite this the cinema was refurbished and given a modern façade. But with the impact of television, the Imperial Cinema was one of many small picture houses to close down, shutting in 1961. It was used as a bingo hall for a time, but is now owned by Industrial Engravers, producing signs, vehicle liveries and banners.

== Landmarks ==
In 1920, the area's war memorial was unveiled. The Battle of the Somme in 1916 accounts for many of the names on the statue's honour roll.

The independent micro brewery The Big Lamp is attached to The Keelman public house which serves the brewery's own cask ale. Originally constructed in 1855 as a pumping station, it lay derelict for a number of years but was protected from demolition by becoming a grade II* listed building, renovated in 1996 and converted into a brewery and public house. The Keelman stands at the entrance to the Tyne Riverside Country Park and is approximately 3 miles (4.8 km) east from the neighbouring village of Wylam.

The Boat House pub stands near Newburn Bridge on Water Row. On it is marked the flood levels of 1771, 1815, 1832 and 1850.

== Transport ==
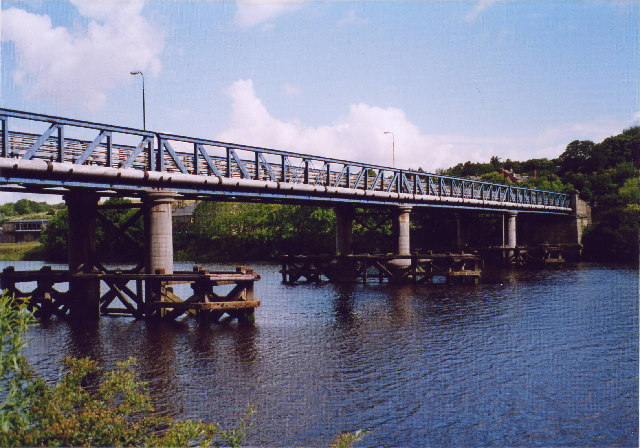
Newburn Bridge was built in 1893

In 1748, the Wylam wagonway opened between Wylam and Lemington, passing through Newburn in doing so. This used horse-drawn carts to take coal from Wylam colliery to the staithes at Lemington. This was upgraded to a five-foot gauge line, and then to a standard gauge line in 1862. Newburn was served by Newburn railway station on the Scotswood, Newburn & Wylam Railway (SN&WR) from 12 July 1875. This railway followed in part the old wagonway. In 1895, the Newburn Hotel was built by F.M. Laing. Located next to the station, the Hotel provided accommodation and stabling facilities for travelers. In 1927 it was acquired by Robert Deuchar. On 15 September 1958 the SN&WR was closed to passengers, preceding the Beeching Axe. The station was finally closed to goods trains on 26 April 1965. The railway line was closed in 1968. The route of the wagonway can still be followed today in the form of a bridleway leading to the Tyne Riverside Country Park, developed in the 1980s.

In the late nineteenth century, the Tyne Improvement Commission arranged for dredging and other works to improve the navigability of the River Tyne. For Newburn, it made the town not only easier to reach by boat, but necessitated the building of a river crossing, and so in 1893 Newburn Bridge was built. It was originally operated as a toll bridge, but was only freed of its tolls on 2 September 1947, making it the last bridge on the Tyne to do so.

In 1914, the Newcastle tramway network was extended to Throckley through Newburn. By then Newburn was a thriving community because of the expansion of Newcastle and the improvement in transport links. In 1946, the tram line to Throckley was replaced by a bus service.

== Education ==
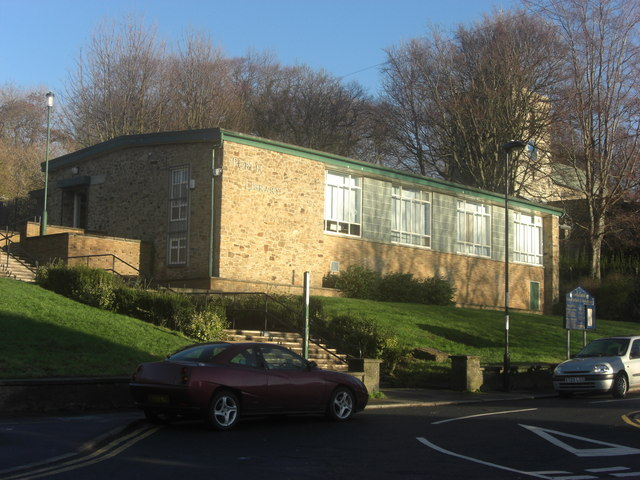
Newburn Library

Newburn Library was built in the 1960s. However, it has bad accessibility and so there are plans to build a new library near Newburn's community centre. The new library is expected to incorporate a doctor's surgery and pharmacy, costing £24 million, with a planned opening of 2012. Newburn Hall Motor Museum was situated in the north of Newburn. The museum was housed in buildings originally built in 1924 as a drill hall for the 4th Northumberland Fusiliers. It became derelict in 1979 but was renovated by car enthusiasts and opened in 1981 to house vintage cars and motorcycles. The museum closed during the Covid pandemic.

Newburn has a primary school and nursery called Newburn Manor Primary School, which has been part of the community since 1890.

== Religious sites ==
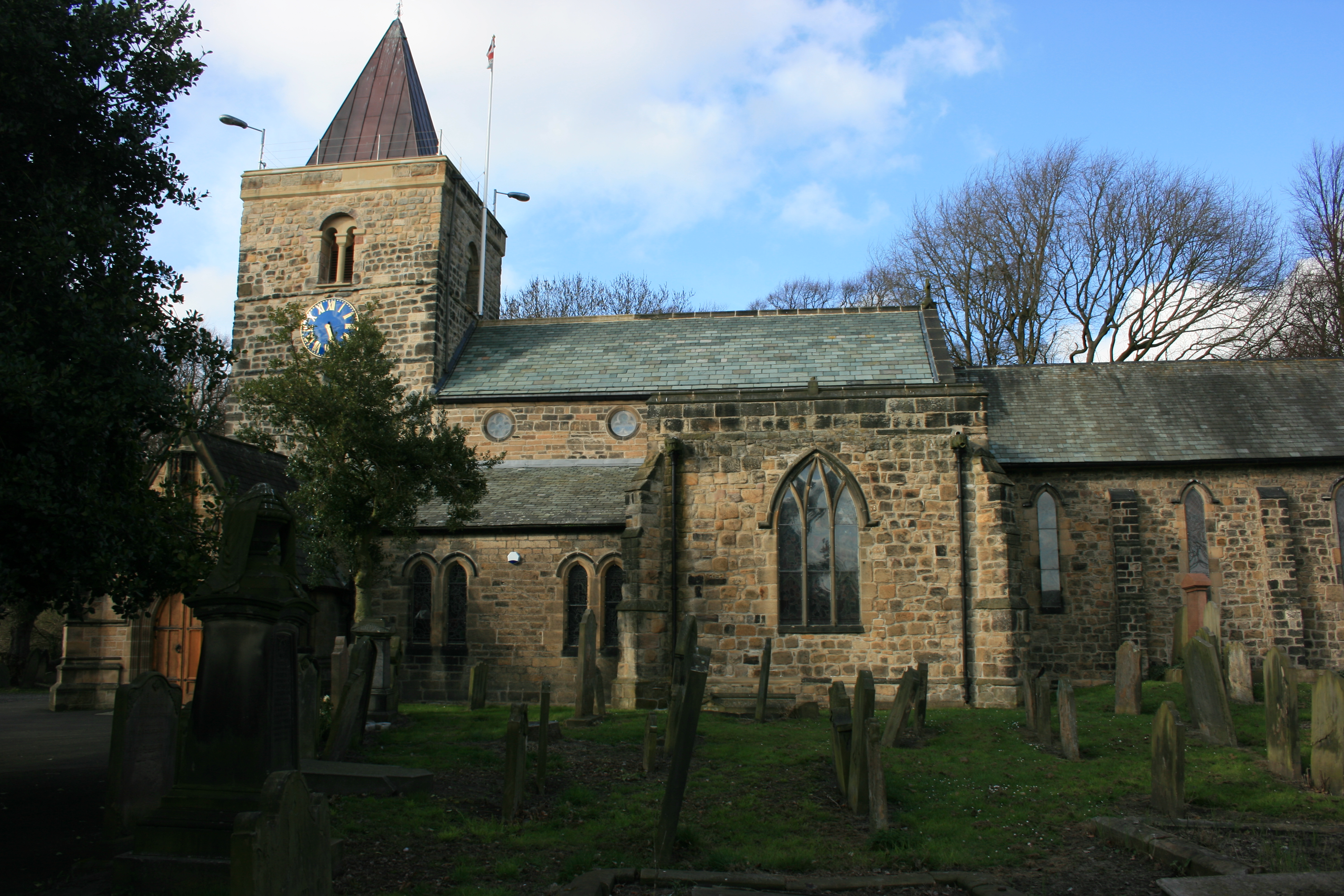
St Michael and All Angels' church in April 2010

St Michael and All Angels' church was built in a commanding position above the area on the site of an earlier wooden-built church, which was burned down in 1067. Osulf II of Bamburgh attacked Copsi, an appointee of William the Conqueror, setting the church alight and slaying Copsi when he emerged from its door. The current church was built over the course of 30 years, beginning in 1070. Parts of Hadrian's Wall were used in its construction. The church was damaged in another fire in 2006, but the current tower has stood since 1100. In the early twentieth century, the Newburn Wesleyan Chapel was built. This has since been demolished.

== Sport ==
Since the early twentieth century, football has been an overwhelming obsession of the north east working man and almost every village had football team. During World War I, there was a women's team from Spencer's Steelworks played in the league. Newburn A.F.C. played at various times through the twentieth century. Newburn won the Northern Football Alliance League Championship on several occasions; 1910–11, 1911–12, 1946–47, 1951–52, and 1961–62. They also won the Premier Division Championship Runners-up Trophy in 1960–61. They were runners-up in the Northern Alliance Challenge Cup in 1951–52, 1952–53 and 1955–56, where they played the Newcastle United A team. They won the Challenge Cup in 1956–57. The team folded in the 1950s, but Bill Humble restarted the team in 1961 and ran it through the 1960s.

Newburn Leisure Centre was built on the site of the club's ground in the 1980s. The land was reclaimed in 1980 as part of the Tyne Riverside Country Park. The first of the centre's two stages was completed in 1985, including changing rooms, management and staff facilities, a function room and car parking. The second phase was completed in 1989, with the completion of the sports hall, storage and ancillary facilities. The centre was formally opened in 1987 by Queen Elizabeth The Queen Mother. The Centre houses Newburn Judo Club, which has produced a number of junior medalists, and is the British Judo Association's centre of excellence for the northern area. The centre also houses a climbing wall, gym and day care, and provides facilities for archery, badminton and football, among other sports.

A number of rowing clubs also operate on the River Tyne at Newburn, including Durham University Boat Club, Tyne United Rowing Club, Tyne Rowing Club and Newcastle University Boat Club.

== Notable people ==
Born in Newburn

- Billy Allen, professional football
- Jack Allen, professional footballer, centre forward
- Ralph Allen, professional footballer
- William Elsdon, railway engineer in Australia
- Matt Forster, professional footballer
- Tommy Hall, professional footballer
- William Hedley, engineer
- Jimmy Jones, professional footballer
- Norman Smith, professional footballer for Charlton Athletic and Queens Park Rangers
- Norman Smith, professional footballer for Huddersfield Town, Sheffield Wednesday and Queens Park Rangers. Later manager of Newcastle United.
- Ralph Spencer, cricketer
- Owen Swindlehurst, Auxiliary Bishop of the Roman Catholic Diocese of Hexham and Newcastle

Worked in Newburn

- Fraser Forster, footballer, played for Newburn FC as a boy
- John Ingham, footballer, played for Newburn AFC for a time
- Jim Mackey, footballer, played for Newburn Colliery FC
- Andy Thompson, footballer, played for Newburn FC for a time
- Joe Spence, footballer, played for Newburn FC for a time
- George Stephenson, engineer, worked in Newburn's Water Row pit for a time
- William John Allen, councillor for Newburn Urban District Council for 34 years until his death in 1949. Governor at RVI and Westerhope Primary School. Miners leader. Social housing. Plaque on house on Stamfordham Road / Windsor Gardens

Lived in Newburn

- Joseph Armstrong, engineer
