= Netherwitton Hall =

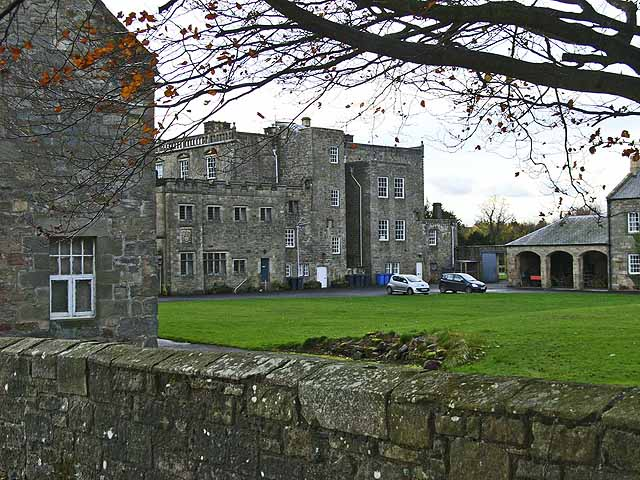
- View from rear

- Location within Northumberland
- 55.2083°N 1.841°W
- Location: Northumberland, England
- OS grid reference: NZ103905

Listed Building – Grade I
- Designated: 6 May 1952
- Reference no.: 1042911

Listed Building – Grade II
- Designated: 30 January 1986
- Reference no.: 1042873

Netherwitton Hall is a mansion house, and a Grade I listed building at Netherwitton, near Morpeth, Northumberland, England.

The estate was owned by the Thornton family from the 14th century. Margaret Thornton, heiress of Netherwitton, married Walter Trevelyan, second son of Sir George Trevelyan Bt. in 1772, and the property has remained in the Trevelyan family ever since. It is currently owned by John Trevelyan, he previously lived there with his now divorced wife Anne-Marie Trevelyan, MP for Berwick upon Tweed and former Transport Secretary.

There has been a house on the site since the 14th century. The present house, which was built in about 1685 to a design by architect Robert Trollope, has an impressive three-storey, seven-bayed frontage with balustrade and unusual irregular window pediments. The rear presents some earlier features including a stairway tower which may contain remnants of ancient fortification. The interior includes a former and disused Roman Catholic chapel.

The gardens contain a folly and masonry features which are protected by Grade II listed building status.
