= Throckley =

Village in Tyne and Wear, England

Coordinates: 54.996°N 1.754°W

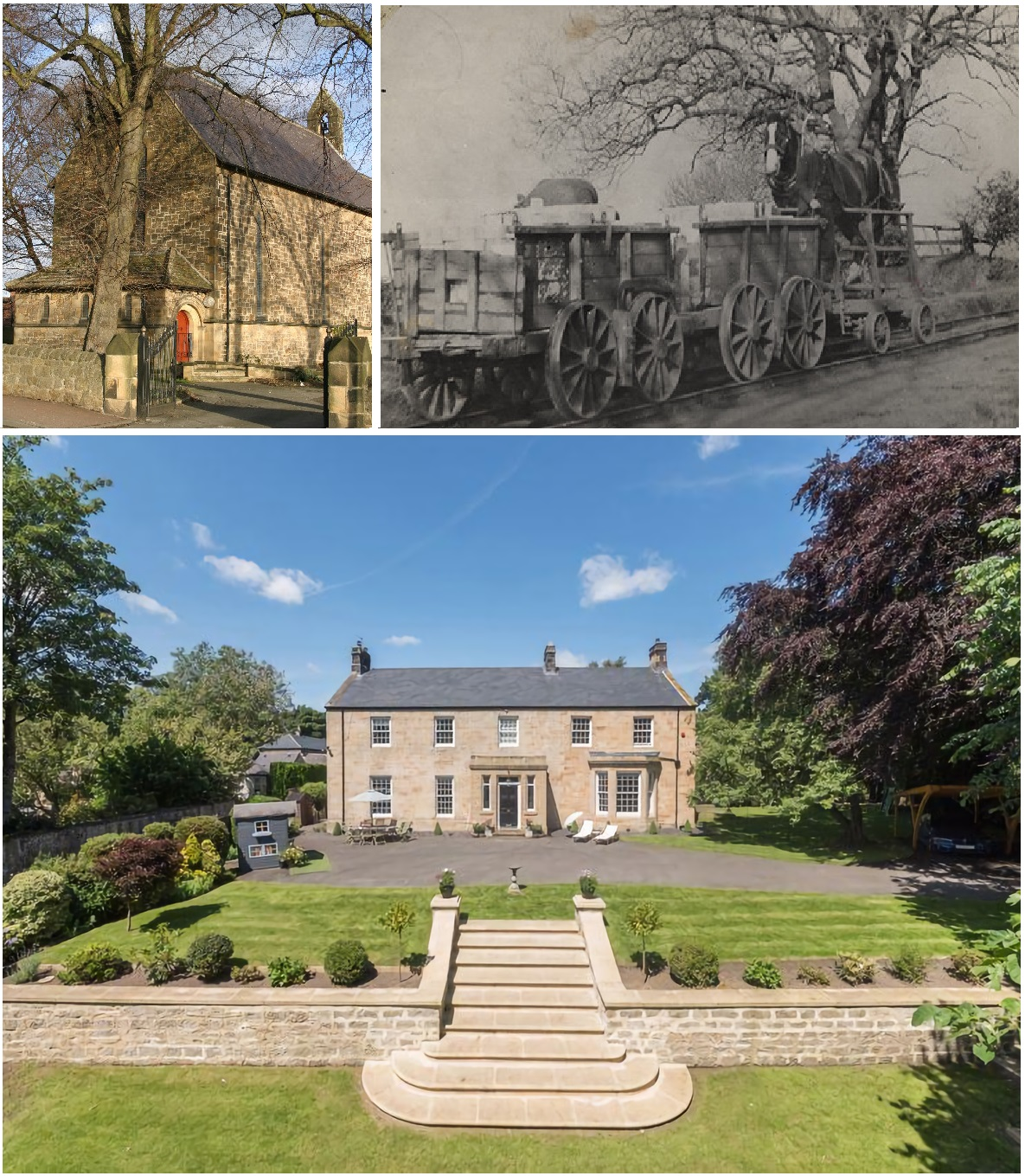
- Top Left:Throckley St. Mary the Virgin Church; Top Right: Dandy Cart of Throckley Colliery; Bottom: Throckley Hall

- Location within Tyne and Wear
- Area: 1.722 km^{2} (0.665 sq mi)
- Population: 6,771
  - Density: 3,932/km^{2} (10,180/sq mi)
- OS grid reference: NZ158668
- Metropolitan borough: Newcastle upon Tyne
- Metropolitan county: Tyne and Wear
- Region: North East
- Country: England
- Sovereign state: United Kingdom
- Post town: NEWCASTLE UPON TYNE
- Postcode district: NE15
- Dialling code: 0191
- Police: Northumbria
- Fire: Tyne and Wear
- Ambulance: North East
- UK Parliament: Hexham

Throckley is a village in the Newcastle upon Tyne district, in the county of Tyne and Wear, England, approximately 7 miles (11 km) west of Newcastle city centre. Hadrian's Wall passed through the village, its course traced by the village's main road, Hexham Road. Throckley lies within the historic county of Northumberland.

Throckley was a colliery village, being adjacent to Throckley Colliery, but with the decline in the coal-mining industry the village has become more urbanised.

The English industrialist, philanthropist and historical Lord Mayor of Newcastle Upon Tyne, Sir William Haswell Stephenson was born in Throckley and lived in the manor house Throckley Hall with his wife and two children, located in the South West of the village. Stephenson owned much of the land surrounding Throckley and the coal pits. He was Mayor of Newcastle upon Tyne in 1875, 1884, and 1894 and Lord Mayor in 1902, 1909, 1910, and 1911.

Other notable residents include William Brown, a consulting engineer in the 18th century, and part owner of Throckley Colliery, who was responsible for the construction of many colliery waggonways throughout the North East of England. As a youngster, George Stephenson worked on Dewley farm which lies to the north of the A69.

Throckley neighbours the villages of Newburn, Walbottle, Blucher, and across the border in Northumberland, Heddon-on-the-Wall. The village expanded with a number of new housing estates having been developed since the mid-2000s.

Amenities include a supermarket, car parts shop, a number of hair salons, social clubs and a working men's club, three care homes for the elderly, two churches, a solarium, funeral parlour, an optometrist, medical surgery, a range of newsagents, a chemist, a Masonic hall, and a primary school (Throckley Primary School).

Throckley's economy is also boosted by the presence of an industrial estate, home to Throckley Brickworks and Warmseal Windows.

== Throckley Hall ==
Throckley Hall is the original Manor House of Throckley and remains to this day. Throckley Hall was constructed in c. 1820 and expanded in c. 1850. Former Lord Mayor of Newcastle Upon Tyne, Sir William Haswell Stephenson was born in Throckley Hall, then known as Throckley House, prior to its expansion in c. 1850 and renaming to Throckley Hall, as it continues to stand to this day.

Sir William lived for many years in Throckley Hall with his wife Eliza Mary Bond and two children, Charlotte and Kate.

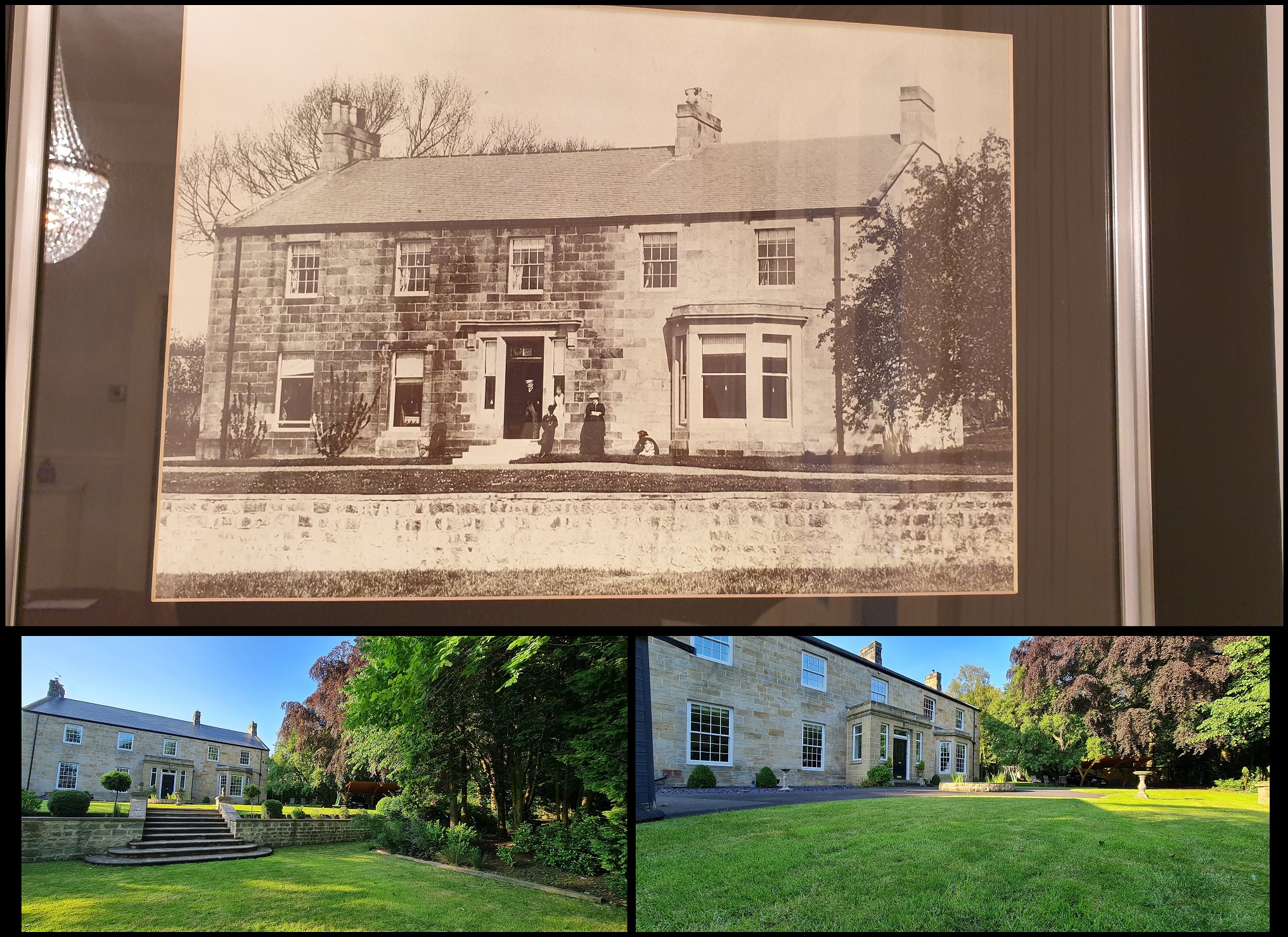
Throckley Hall c. 1900 (top) & current photographs

The Stephenson family continued to reside in Throckley Hall following the death of Sir William. Other notable residents included Major William Ernest Stephenson, who held the rank of Major in the Northumberland Fusiliers of the British Army.

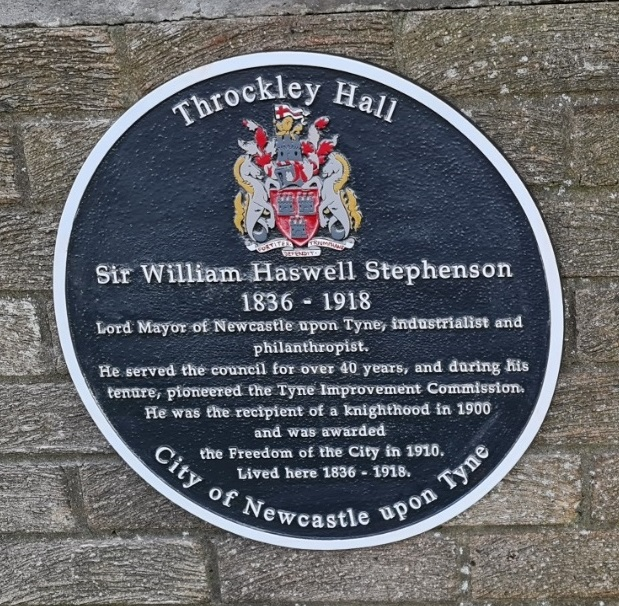
Commemorative Plaque of Sir Stephenson at Throckley Hall

Throckley Hall has been preserved and remains a private residence along with the associated land, which includes formal gardens surrounding the house as well as several acres of protected woodland and meadows. Throckley Hall retains many original and antique features, with original plaster mouldings in the hallways as well as the formal state rooms: drawing room and dining room. Throckley Hall was featured on Antiques Roadshow in 1987.

== Sightseeing and scenery ==
Throckley itself, especially the Bank Top area, offers views over the Tyne Valley, and looking west, to the distant Pennines. The Guardian featured Throckley in the top fifty walks guide for 2007.

Throckley Dene is a stretch of semi-natural ancient woodland in a steep-sided valley with Dewley Burn running through. National cycle route 72 passes through South Throckley, along the edge of the River Tyne before continuing West towards Wylam Village. The South West region of Throckley contains other areas of ancient woodland, particularly around Throckley Hall and the tree-lined roads. The South West and Western regions of Throckley are designated Green Belt areas.

Throckley Pond lies south west of the village and is surrounded by woodland and meadows, several fishing platforms line the Northern shore of the pond and public footpaths extend South to the River Tyne and West towards Heddon-on-the-Wall.

== Civil parish ==
Throckley was formerly a township in the parish of Newburn, from 1866 Throckley was a civil parish in its own right, on 1 April 1935 the parish was abolished and merged with Newburn. In 1931 the parish had a population of 2332.

== Bibliography ==
- Dunham, A. C. & V. E. H. Strasser-King (1981) Petrology of the Great Whin Sill in the Throckley Borehole, Northumberland, Inst. Geol. Sci. Rep. 81–4; 32 pp.
- "Throckley Colliery". Durham Mining Museum.
