= Greater Manchester mayoral elections =

Elections of the Mayor of Greater Manchester, the leader of the Greater Manchester Combined Authority, are held on a four-year cycle.

== Elections ==
Elections are held as follows:

- 2017 Greater Manchester mayoral election
- 2021 Greater Manchester mayoral election (delayed from 2020 due to COVID-19)
- 2024 Greater Manchester mayoral election
- 2026 Greater Manchester mayoral by-election
- 2028 Greater Manchester mayoral election

=== By-elections ===
By-elections are as follows:

- 2026 Greater Manchester mayoral by-election

== Results ==
Results summaries

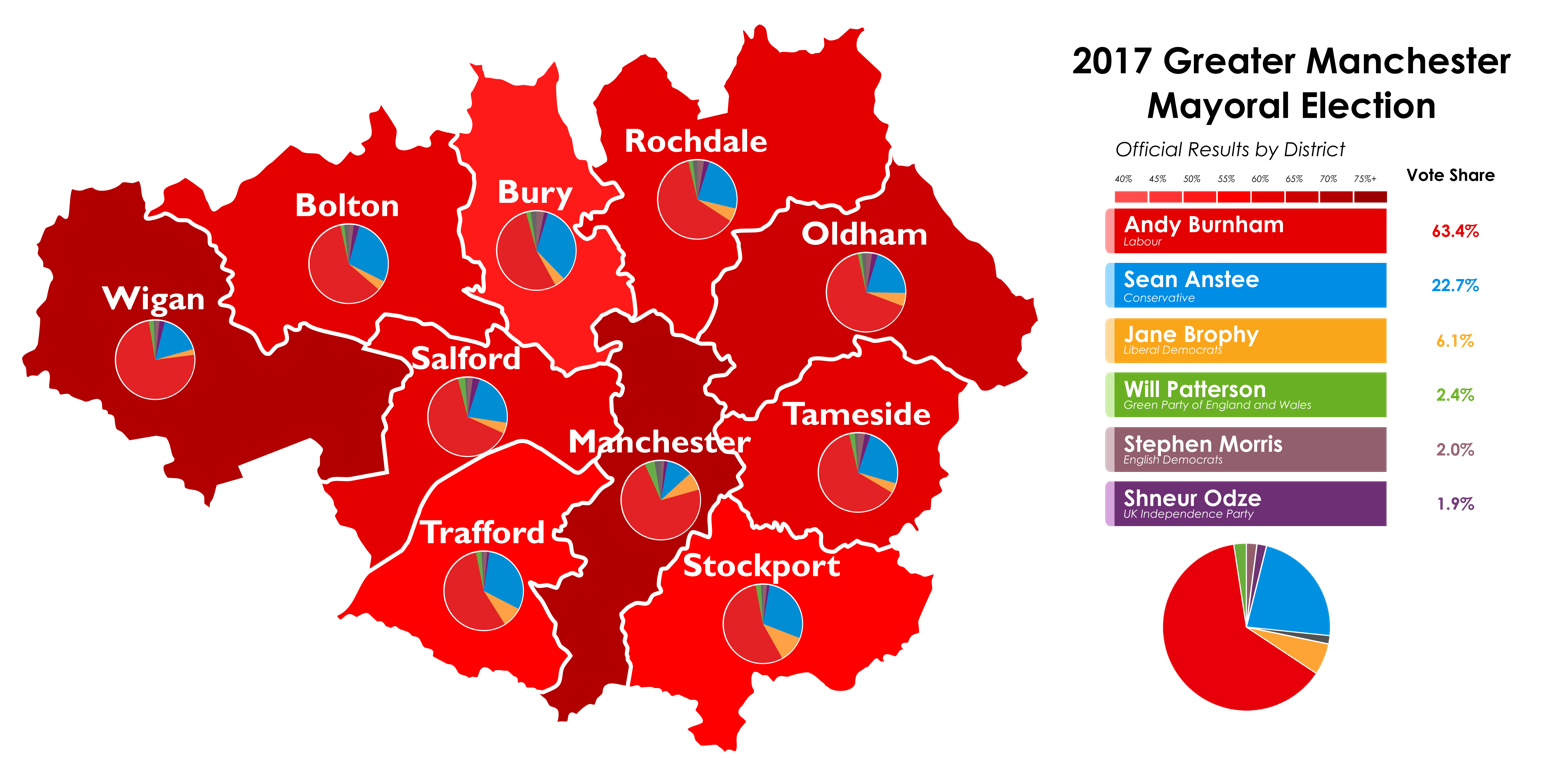
2017

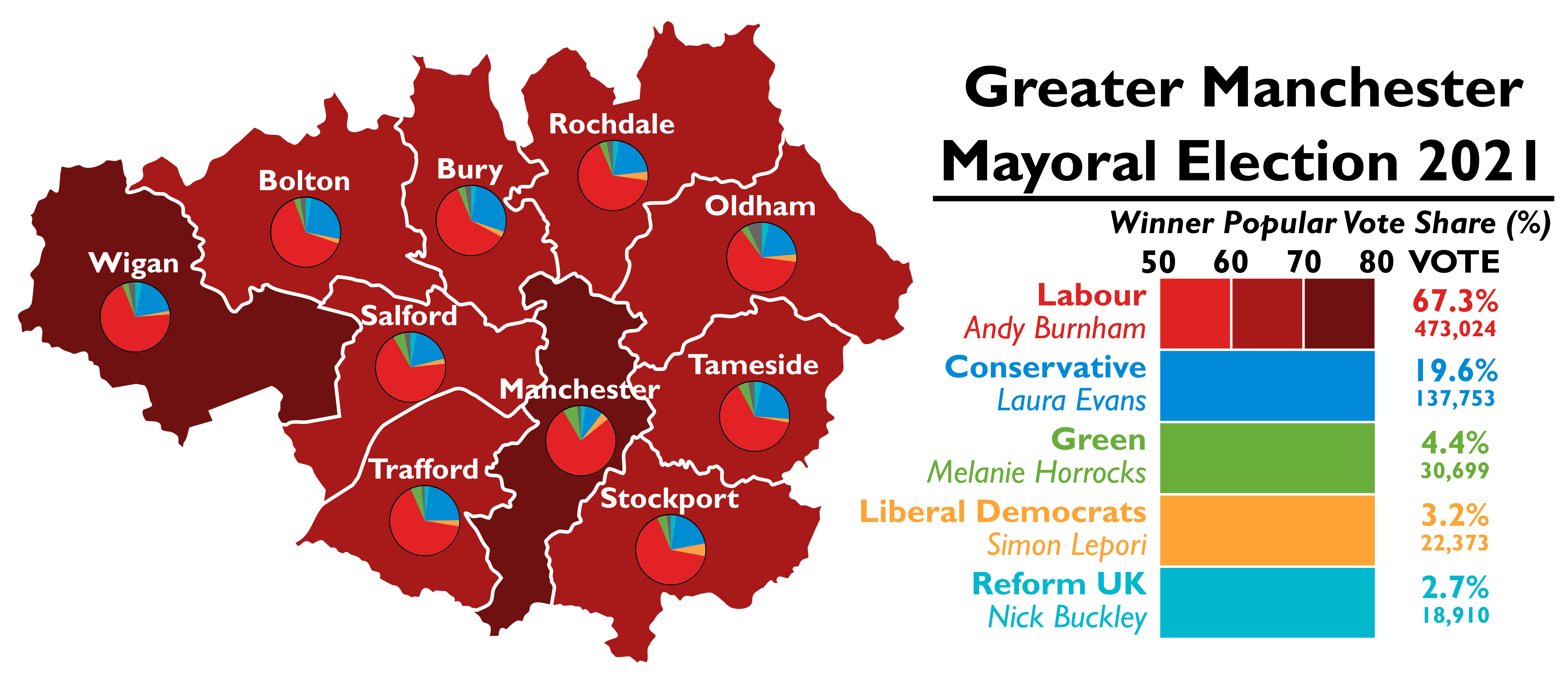
2021

2024
