= Mayoralty of Andy Burnham =

Tenure of Andy Burnham as Greater Manchester Mayor (2017-2026)

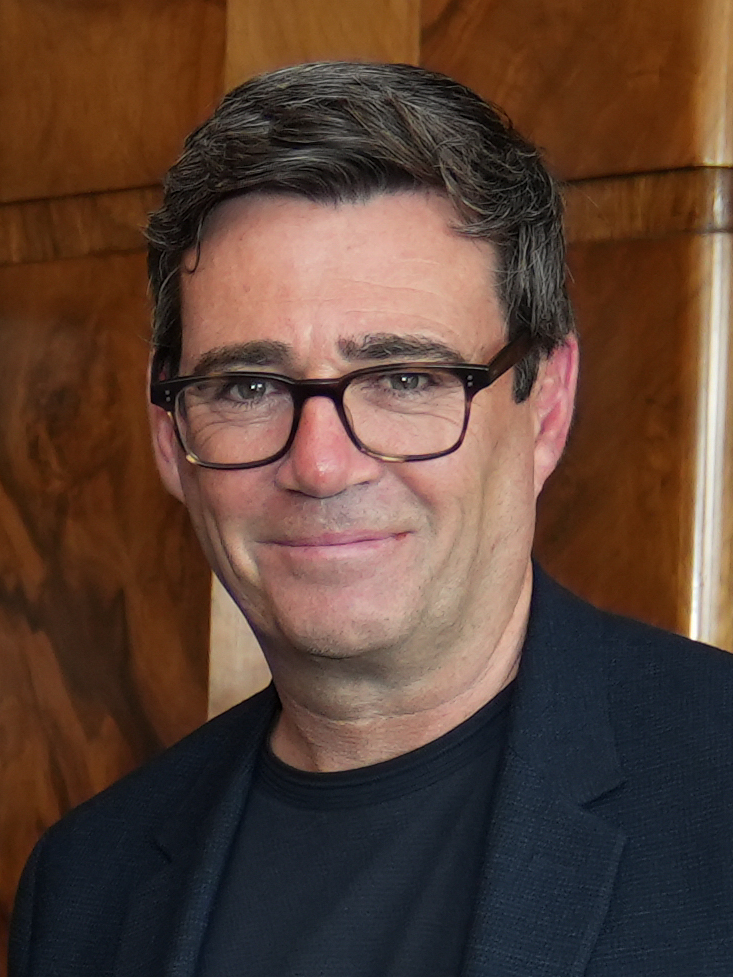
- Burnham in 2024
- Mayoralty of Andy Burnham; 8 May 2017 – 19 June 2026
- Premier: Theresa May; Boris Johnson; Liz Truss; Rishi Sunak; Keir Starmer
- Party: Labour Co-op
- Election: 2017; 2021; 2024
- Seat: Greater Manchester

The mayoralty of Andy Burnham began on 8 May 2017 following his victory in the region's inaugural mayoral election, and concluded on 18 June 2026 upon his disqualification as a result of his election as a Member of Parliament.

== History ==
As member of the Labour Party and the Co-operative Party, Burnham won three consecutive mayoral terms in 2017, 2021, and 2024, consistently securing large majorities across all ten metropolitan boroughs of Greater Manchester. As the region's first directly elected metro mayor, Burnham exercised executive authority over the Greater Manchester Combined Authority, which included direct control over regional strategy, transport, adult skills training, housing, and the combined statutory responsibilities of the police, fire and crime commissioner for the Greater Manchester Police and the Greater Manchester Fire and Rescue Service.

Burnham's nine-year administration was heavily defined by comprehensive structural reforms to public infrastructure and regional social policy. His signature achievement was the creation of the Bee Network, a publicly controlled, integrated, London-style transit system that brought the region's deregulated bus network back under municipal control for the first time since 1985. On social policy, Burnham prioritised the regional housing crisis by launching the "A Bed Every Night" emergency scheme to combat street poverty, alongside establishing the "Greater Manchester Good Landlord Charter" to enforce tenant protections. His tenure was also marked by crisis management, beginning with his immediate coordination of the local logistics and charitable response following the 2017 Manchester Arena bombing. During the COVID-19 pandemic, Burnham achieved national prominence and the media moniker "King of the North" for leading a fierce, high-stakes political stand-off against the central government to secure enhanced furlough funding and economic safeguards for northern communities.

While Burnham maintained consistently high approval ratings within the city-region, his mayoralty faced challenges, including the temporary placement of the Greater Manchester Police into special monitoring measures and ongoing regional disputes over green belt usage under the "Places for Everyone" spatial framework.

In mid-2026, amid a rapid decline in national confidence toward the government of Keir Starmer, Burnham engineered a return to parliamentary politics by contesting and winning a seat in the House of Commons. By law, his election to Parliament disqualified him from holding office as mayor, triggering a by-election and setting the stage for his subsequent selection as Labour leader and his appointment as Prime Minister of the United Kingdom on 20 July 2026.

== Elections ==
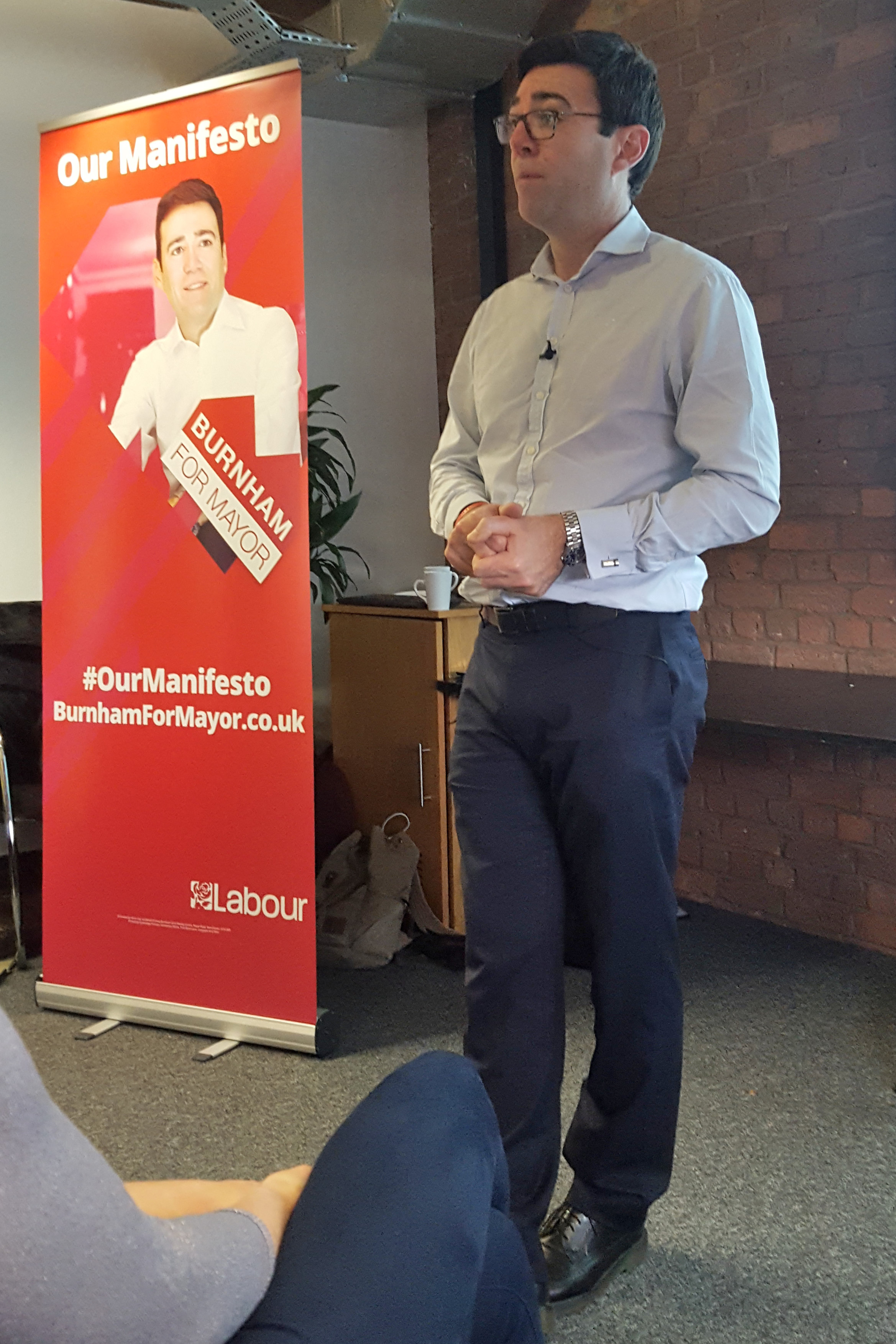
Burnham campaigning for mayor in 2016

On 5 May 2016, a spokesperson for Andy Burnham confirmed that party officials in Greater Manchester had approached him to run in the region's upcoming inaugural mayoral election, which would require him to step down from the Corbyn shadow cabinet. Burnham officially confirmed his candidacy on 18 May 2016 and was selected as the internal Labour Party candidate that August. To focus entirely on his mayoral bid, Burnham announced in September that he would resign as Shadow Home Secretary once a replacement was found; he was succeeded by Diane Abbott in October. While he initially intended to resign his parliamentary seat for the Leigh constituency only after the mayoral vote, the snap 2017 general election was called just two weeks prior to the mayoral polling day, resulting in Burnham simply choosing not to stand again as an MP.

Burnham was elected as the first Mayor of Greater Manchester on 5 May 2017, securing 63% of the vote and winning majorities in all ten of the region's boroughs. Upon taking office, he became entitled to the style of Mayor. In his victory speech, Burnham struck a regionalist tone, declaring that politics "has been too London-centric for too long" and promising that "Greater Manchester is going to take control... and make it work better for people."

He was re-elected for a second term on 6 May 2021, increasing his vote share to 67% on a turnout of 34.7%. During this campaign, Burnham made several major policy pledges, including a commitment to make the city-region carbon neutral by 2038, build 30,000 social homes over a decade, and introduce a "Good Landlord Charter" to enforce health standards and oppose "no-fault" evictions. Crucially, he also pledged to reverse decades of deregulation by bringing Greater Manchester's bus services back into public control under an integrated ticketing system with Manchester Metrolink trams—a move the BBC noted would make it the first area outside London to do so since 1986. This vision began materializing on the ground in September 2023 with the launch of the publicly controlled Bee Network.

Having previously run for the national Labour Party leadership in both the 2010 and 2015 contests, Burnham's political future remained a subject of frequent national media speculation. In early 2023, he sought to clarify his immediate plans by confirming his intention to run for a third mayoral term. While he repeatedly stated he would serve out his full second term, he kept his options open regarding a future return to Westminster, refusing to rule out standing as an MP or launching a future leadership bid after his mayoral commitments concluded. This speculation intensified ahead of the eventual general election. However, Burnham remained focused on the region, and on 2 May 2024, he secured a third term as mayor with 63.4% of the vote on a 32.5% turnout. This marked the first Greater Manchester mayoral election conducted under the first-past-the-post system, with Burnham cementing his regional dominance by winning in every electoral ward except one.

== Homelessness and housing ==
The issue of homelessness in Greater Manchester was a major focus of Burnham's 2017 mayoral campaign, during which he pledged to donate 15% of his mayoral salary to charities tackling the crisis if elected. Following his victory, he established the Greater Manchester Mayor’s Homelessness Fund to channel corporate and public donations directly toward local charities, mental health support, and rehabilitation services. He initially set a highly ambitious, legally non-binding pledge to end rough sleeping in the city-region entirely by the year 2020. To combat the issue on the ground, Burnham launched his flagship "A Bed Every Night" scheme in 2018, which aimed to guarantee emergency accommodation and targeted support for every single person sleeping rough across the region's ten boroughs.

The implementation of "A Bed Every Night" initially yielded strong tangible results, as the initiative expanded to provide more than 600 emergency bed spaces across the region. Assisted by dedicated multi-agency teams focused on permanent rehousing and addiction care, the official count of rough sleepers in Greater Manchester dropped significantly from 268 individuals in 2017 to a low of 90 in 2021. This success was heavily bolstered by the UK-wide "Everyone In" initiative during the COVID-19 pandemic, which temporarily provided local authorities with the statutory powers and funding necessary to clear the streets. However, despite these localized reductions, Burnham officially admitted in November 2019 that the systemic complexities of the crisis—compounded by national welfare policy—meant he would miss his original 2020 deadline to eliminate street homelessness entirely.

Following the pandemic-era lows, Burnham's homelessness strategy faced severe structural headwinds. From 2022 onward, a combination of the national cost-of-living crisis, a chronic shortage of social housing, and rapid evictions within the asylum system severely strained Greater Manchester's support network. By 2025, annual single-night snapshot estimates showed that the number of rough sleepers in the region had risen back up to 197 people. While critics and political opponents pointed to these figures as a failure to deliver on his primary mayoral mandate, homelessness charities and his administration's lead for housing, Paul Dennett, defended the regional model. They argued that while the local network successfully mitigated the worst effects of the crisis, long-term street homelessness could not be fully eradicated without wider macroeconomic interventions and central government policy changes.

Despite these ongoing local challenges, Burnham's work on regional homelessness heavily informed his wider political messaging and national profile. He frequently used the visibility of the "A Bed Every Night" initiative to criticize the central government's funding allocations and to advocate for a nationwide "Housing First" approach. Ultimately, this localized policy framework became a cornerstone of his broader political platform; upon his return to Westminster and subsequent appointment as Prime Minister of the United Kingdom in July 2026, Burnham dedicated his very first Downing Street address to pledging a national, £340 million program modelled after his Greater Manchester initiatives to eliminate long-term rough sleeping across the country.

== Public transport ==
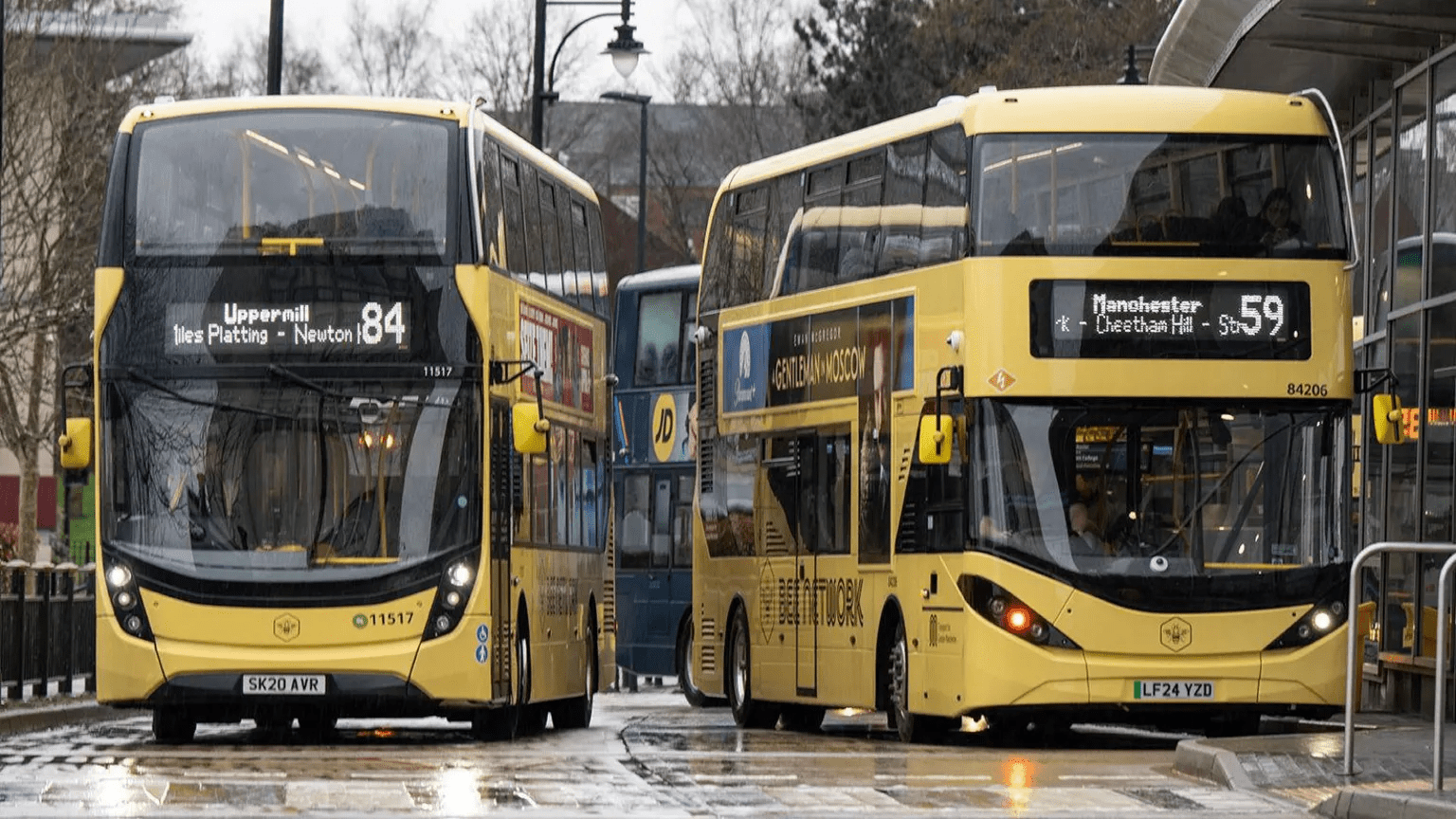
Bee Network buses operated by Stagecoach Manchester at Oldham bus station

In 2020, Burnham signed off on a new £10 yearly administration charge for pensioners who wished to continue using their Transport for Greater Manchester (TfGM) travel passes on the region's trains and trams. This controversial levy was intended to stabilize local authority funding as part of a wider fiscal transition toward creating an integrated, London-style public transport network. Critics frequently contrasted this policy against the transport system of Greater London, where residents of London boroughs receive entirely free travel on all public transport systems from the age of 60 via the Freedom Pass. Conversely, Burnham kept the Greater Manchester system strictly aligned with the state pension age, which phased in much later for local retirees.

The financial trade-offs from these local concessions helped lay the groundwork for Burnham’s primary mayoral mandate: bringing Greater Manchester's disjointed bus network back into public ownership. Following decades of private deregulation across England outside of the capital, the Greater Manchester Combined Authority approved a comprehensive bus franchising system. However, the multi-million-pound reform was immediately challenged in court by prominent private bus operators, including the Stagecoach Group and Rotala. The operators accused the administration of conducting a legally flawed consultation process during the economic disruptions of the pandemic, arguing that the public franchising model was high-risk and economically unviable.

The legal deadlock was broken in March 2022 when a High Court judge ruled that the mayoral authority's decision-making process was entirely lawful and reasonable. This regional legal victory was cemented in July 2022 when the Court of Appeal unanimously rejected a subsequent challenge by Rotala. Media analysts and legal scholars noted that this landmark ruling set a powerful national precedent, effectively carving out a legal roadmap for other English city-regions—such as the Liverpool City Region and South Yorkshire—to reverse the sweeping public transport privatization wave that had dominated the country since the Transport Act 1985.

With full regulatory power restored to the local state, Burnham swiftly enacted targeted cost-of-living measures by introducing a capped fare system in September 2022, limiting adult single bus journeys to £2. This structural overhaul culminated in September 2023 with the official launch of the Bee Network, an integrated public transport network combining buses, the Manchester Metrolink tram system, and active cycling infrastructure under a unified brand and ticketing model. The regional success of this initiative significantly elevated Burnham's national political profile, establishing a template for local government public ownership models that would later heavily influence broader national transport infrastructure debates.

== Manchester Arena bombing ==
"After our darkest of nights, Manchester is today waking up to the most difficult of dawns. It is hard to believe what has happened here in the last few hours and to put into words the shock, anger and hurt that we feel today. These were children, young people and their families that those responsible chose to terrorise and kill. This was an evil act. Our first thoughts are with the families of those killed and injured and we will do whatever we can to support them."

— Burnham on the terrorist attack

Following the Manchester Arena bombing on 22 May 2017—which occurred at the conclusion of a concert by American pop singer Ariana Grande—Burnham coordinated the immediate local response, operating directly from the region's emergency command centre to manage public communications, extensive transport disruptions, and emergency logistics. He publicly condemned the suicide bombing as an "evil act" that deliberately targeted children and young families, a sentiment that resonated across a grieving region. In the immediate aftermath of the tragedy, Burnham partnered with the Manchester City Council and the British Red Cross to launch the We Love Manchester Emergency Fund. The charity ultimately raised more than £17 million from corporate and public donations, including millions generated by Grande's star-studded One Love Manchester benefit concert, providing critical financial aid and long-term welfare support directly to the bereaved families and severely injured survivors.

Prime Minister Theresa May travelled to Manchester on 23 May 2017 to assess the crisis first-hand, meeting privately with Burnham, emergency service responders, and frontline National Health Service hospital staff treating victims. Publicly, May delivered a solemn address outside 10 Downing Street condemning the "sickening cowardice" of the attacker and declaring that the spirit of Manchester and the wider United Kingdom would never be broken by terrorism. In their private operational discussions, May gave Burnham explicit assurances that the central government would fully support the city throughout its long-term recovery process, promising to provide the necessary national resources and funding to handle the complex aftermath of the atrocity.

However, during this period of immense grief and intense public scrutiny, Burnham faced highly publicized criticism from Manchester-born singer Morrissey. In a widely reported social media statement that targeted several prominent British politicians—including May, Queen Elizabeth II, and London Mayor Sadiq Khan—Morrissey accused regional leaders of offering empty platitudes. He specifically criticized Burnham for using general terminology like "extremist" during official press briefings, claiming the Mayor was intentionally failing to specify the exact radical Islamic ideology driving the perpetrator. This public rebuke held a distinct personal weight for Burnham, who had been an ardent, lifelong fan of Morrissey's former band The Smiths since his teenage years, frequently citing their music as a definitive cultural influence on his political outlook.

The relationship between the Greater Manchester local authority and the central government grew increasingly strained over the subsequent months regarding the true financial burden of the emergency response. Burnham wrote a formal appeal to May requesting £17 million to fully reimburse the Greater Manchester Police, local NHS trusts, and municipal councils for their massive operational expenditures. May responded with a letter stating that the government would only cover "reasonable" costs, stopping short of guaranteeing the full figure—a caveat that Burnham publicly and fiercely challenged by arguing that an act of national terrorism should never force further cuts to local public services. Following months of intense political friction, public petitioning, and sustained pressure from Burnham and a cross-party coalition of local MPs, the government eventually capitulated, settling the dispute with a comprehensive £24 million funding package that fully cleared the region's emergency debts.

== COVID-19 pandemic ==
In March 2020, as the initial wave of the COVID-19 pandemic began to take hold across the United Kingdom, Burnham stepped forward to demand clearer, more decisive guidance from Westminster on how to slow the spread of the virus. In doing so, he frequently pointed to his own past ministerial experience as Health Secretary during the 2009 swine flu pandemic, arguing that clear public messaging was vital during a national health emergency. When Prime Minister Boris Johnson, Chancellor Rishi Sunak, and Health Secretary Matt Hancock introduced targeted regional restrictions across Greater Manchester and Lancashire that July, Burnham initially welcomed the proactive interventions, even though certain boroughs in North West England actually maintained lower infection rates than other parts of the country at the time.

As the summer progressed, Burnham shifted his focus toward protecting low-income workers who were slipping through the cracks of the national safety net. In August 2020, he joined forces with the Mayor of the Liverpool City Region, Steve Rotheram, to mount a public campaign demanding that the government financially compensate workers who were legally mandated to self-isolate by the NHS test and trace system. Recognizing systemic flaws in the national infrastructure, Burnham also redirected municipal funding and Combined Authority resources to establish a localized, grassroots contact-tracing network to plug the gaps where the centralized Westminster system was failing to track outbreaks. By the autumn, as infection numbers surged again, the British government unveiled a standardized three-tiered system of localized social and economic restrictions. Greater Manchester was initially placed under Tier 2 guidelines, but Downing Street immediately opened high-stakes negotiations with Burnham and local council leaders to force the region into the maximum Tier 3 bracket. Burnham fiercely resisted, demanding a comprehensive financial package that included an 80% furlough scheme to protect employee wages—matching the baseline support provided during the first national wave—while publicly stating that he would prefer a short, nationwide "circuit-breaker" lockdown over fragmented regional restrictions.

The political standoff reached a boiling point when Burnham discovered that the government had quietly implemented significantly more generous financial support packages for businesses in London under Tier 2 than what was being offered to the North under Tier 3. His defiant, televised stand against Downing Street during these tense negotiations captured the national imagination, prompting various major media outlets to dub him the "King of the North" for utilizing his platform to fight not just for his own constituents, but for the economic survival of the wider North of England. The public reaction to his resistance was deeply divided; a national poll conducted by YouGov revealed that while a portion of the British public viewed his actions as a display of cynical party politics, a larger majority—particularly across northern communities—believed he was acting genuinely in the best interests of Manchester's working-class population.

By 15 October 2020, the relationship between local leaders and the central government fractured entirely when Burnham and a united front of North West politicians formally walked away from the negotiating table, refusing to voluntarily sign off on Tier 3 status. He argued passionately that the proposed business grants and reduced 67% furlough rates were fundamentally insufficient, warning that forcing the region into lockdown without proper economic cushions would plunge thousands of families into immediate poverty and destitution—societal harms that he argued would outweigh the direct health impacts of the virus if mitigated correctly. Crucially, Burnham's arguments broke through traditional partisan lines, as his core concerns regarding the economic devastation of local businesses and workers were publicly echoed and supported by several Conservative MPs representing constituencies within and around Greater Manchester.

== Spatial Planning and Growth Locations ==
The Greater Manchester Spatial Framework (GMSF) was established as a landmark cooperative agreement between the Mayor and the leaders of the ten local metropolitan boroughs to dictate strategic land use across Greater Manchester, specifically balancing aggressive housing development targets against the preservation of the protected Green Belt. As the final draft of the multi-decade blueprint was prepared for a late 2020 release, acute political anxieties emerged that the borough of Stockport might formally reject the proposal. In response, Burnham and several supportive council leaders issued a stark public warning to opposition politicians, arguing that scuppering a unified regional strategy would strip local authorities of collective legal protections, thereby exposing the region to aggressive, developer-led planning appeals and an even greater loss of green spaces. While the final draft was successfully published in October 2020 and signed off by the majority of municipal leaders ahead of a scheduled public consultation in December, the fragile regional consensus ultimately shattered. Councillors on the Stockport Metropolitan Borough Council voted decisively against adopting the GMSF, forcing the remaining nine boroughs and the Mayor to pivot and construct a revised joint framework known as the "Places for Everyone" plan, which effectively salvaged the core spatial strategy for the rest of the city-region.

On 21st March 2024, Places for Everyone (PfE) was successfully adopted by Bury, Bolton, Manchester, Oldham, Salford, Rochdale, Tameside, Trafford, and Wigan, covering the period 2022 to 2039 and targeting the construction of 175,000+ new homes with a strong share of affordable housing. The plan adopts a brownfield-first approach and strong protections for the Green Belt.

Places for Everyone set the foundations for the Integrated Pipeline and Growth Locations programme, which established 6 major areas across the city-region earmarked for development and investment. These are as follows:

- Central Growth Cluster, covering the metropolitan urban core of Central Manchester and City Centre Salford, along with Victoria North and Salford Quays.
- Eastern Growth Cluster, located entirely within Tameside and comprising Ashton and Stalybridge town centres, as well as the 'Hyde Triangle'.
- Western Gateway, connecting the Old Trafford regeneration site to New Carrington and Port Salford.
- Airport and Southern Growth Corridor, linking MIX Manchester and Wythenshawe to Stockport Town Centre.
- North East Growth Corridor, an expansive area covering Atom Valley's Mayoral Development Zone to strategic sites in Rochdale and Oldham.
- NorthFold, comprising sites in the boroughs of Bolton and Bury.

== Greater Manchester Police ==
In late 2020, Burnham’s administration was hit by a severe institutional crisis when a damning report revealed that Greater Manchester Police (GMP) had completely failed to record an estimated 80,000 crimes over the course of a single year. The systemic failure led to the force being abruptly placed into an "advanced phase" of special measures—effectively regulatory monitoring—by Her Majesty's Inspectorate of Constabulary and Fire & Rescue Services (HMICFRS). Because the devolution deal legally combined the regional mayoralty with the statutory duties of a Police and Crime Commissioner, Burnham found himself under intense, sustained political pressure from both national media and local opposition parties, who accused him of failing to provide adequate oversight of the country's second-largest police force.

To mitigate the fallout and restore eroding public trust, Burnham responded by forcing out the Chief Constable, Ian Hopkins, and initiating an emergency overhaul of the force's operational culture. He launched a high-profile "named officer" scheme designed to radically improve localized accountability by ensuring every neighbourhood in Greater Manchester had a designated, contactable constable and sergeant responsible for community crime tracking. The political friction deepened further in late January 2021 when Burnham publicly alleged that senior elements within the Greater Manchester Police hierarchy had deliberately withheld critical operational information from his mayoral office, highlighting a profound breakdown in communication and trust between the civilian leadership and the force's executive command.

== Investigations into child sexual exploitation ==
Shortly after first being elected as Mayor in 2017, Burnham fulfilled a key campaign commitment by initiating a major independent review into historical child sexual abuse allegations across Manchester and Rochdale, later expanding the investigative scope to include Oldham following intense pressure from survivors and whistle-blowers. This sweeping, multi-year inquiry was designed to evaluate whether local authorities and the Greater Manchester Police had systematically ignored or covered up institutional failures and group-based child sexual exploitation. The massive undertaking was published in distinct, highly publicized stages. Part one, focusing heavily on past failures in Manchester, reported its findings in 2020. Part two, centring on the handling of cases in Oldham, was released in 2022. Part three, detailing historic institutional blind spots and missed opportunities in Rochdale, followed in 2023. The final component, part four, was led directly by His Majesty's Inspectorate of Constabulary and Fire & Rescue Services (HMICFRS) to provide a comprehensive, force-wide assessment of Greater Manchester’s historical policing failures, delivering its definitive report in 2025.

The multi-stage findings sent shockwaves through the region's political and policing establishments, revealing decades of systemic institutional negligence, a culture of victim-blaming among frontline officers, and a repeated failure by social services to protect vulnerable young people. In January 2025, immediately following the publication of the final HMICFRS report, Burnham used his political platform to back growing, urgent calls for a nationwide public inquiry with a specific, limited scope into group-based child sexual exploitation—a crisis widely referred to in British media as the grooming gangs scandal. Burnham argued passionately that any national inquiry must be legally equipped with the statutory power to compel witnesses to give evidence under oath, ensuring that senior officials from police forces, councils, and social care providers across the country could finally be held fully accountable for past failures.

Burnham's public intervention came at a moment of intense national legislative tension, arriving exactly one day after the House of Commons voted down a high-profile amendment demanding an immediate public inquiry into the matter. The amendment had been attached to the Children's Wellbeing and Schools Bill by the opposition Conservative Party but was ultimately rejected along partisan lines. The governing Labour Party had applied a strict party whip against the proposal, viewing the opposition's tactic as a political "wrecking amendment" designed to derail the wider education bill rather than offer a constructive legislative solution. By stepping forward to publicly endorse the core principle of the inquiry, Burnham deliberately broke ranks with the national party line, highlighting his willingness to leverage his independent mayoral status to prioritize regional survivor advocacy over Westminster's strict partisan dynamics.

== Greater Manchester Baccalaureate ==
Following his third consecutive victory in the 2024 mayoral election, Burnham prioritized localized education reform by outlining an ambitious strategy to create an alternative to traditional higher education, stating his desire to "give everyone growing up [in Manchester] an equal alternative to the university route". This vision centred on the creation of the Greater Manchester Baccalaureate, or "MBacc," a groundbreaking technical education framework developed in close collaboration with regional and prospective businesses. The policy was designed to bridge a prominent structural gap in the local economy; prior to its introduction, nearly two-thirds of the region's 16-year-olds did not pursue or achieve the traditional academic English Baccalaureate (EBacc). By creating a clear parallel pathway, Burnham sought to provide long-term certainty that young people in Greater Manchester would be equipped with the exact technical skill sets actively demanded by local industries.

The academic framework of the MBacc was engineered to reshape secondary and further education choices by guiding students toward specialized GCSE subjects—such as engineering, computer science, and creative modules—alongside a core foundation of English and mathematics. Upon turning 16, students within the program matriculate into one of seven distinct, employer-led "career gateways" mapped directly onto growing sectors of the regional economy, including manufacturing, engineering, digital, and healthcare fields. These gateways guide learners toward high-tier technical vocational qualifications, primarily T-Level awards and BTECs, culminating at age 18 with direct access to higher technical qualifications (HTQs), degree apprenticeships, or immediate employment. The initiative began its initial phased rollout across participating schools and colleges during the 2024–25 academic year, with the final goal of becoming fully operational across the entirety of the city-region by 2030.

The implementation of the MBacc significantly altered the national debate surrounding regional devolution and the centralization of educational curricula in England. Rather than operating strictly under the remit of the national Department for Education, Burnham leveraged his mayoral authority to integrate skills training with regional transit infrastructure and local labour intelligence, using systems like the Greater Manchester Police and local National Health Service trusts to launch dedicated technical work placements. While the initiative received strong backing from Whitehall and national education bodies, it faced ongoing scrutiny from further education leaders. Critics and policy analysts frequently pointed out that despite the program's structural innovation, it faced significant external challenges, including a national decline in apprenticeship starts, uneven graduate retention, and the complex task of securing long-term financial buy-in from multi-academy trusts to ensure the technical pathways achieved true parity of accessibility with traditional universities.

== DJ sets ==
Burnham has frequently incorporated his love for guitar bands and indie music into his public persona, regularizing his appearance behind DJ decks during his near decade-long tenure as the Mayor of Greater Manchester. He often used these musical performances to support regional charity initiatives, such as the high-profile Greater Manchester Mayors Charity DJ battles against neighbouring Merseyside figures, including Mayor of the Liverpool City Region Steve Rotheram. His song choices heavily lean on classic "Madchester" and alternative staples. Tracklists from his sets feature prominent artists like The Stone Roses ("Mersey Paradise"), The Clash ("Train in Vain"), and Doves ("There Goes the Fear"). He has also voiced strong appreciation for guitar music beyond Manchester, citing debut albums from Leeds indie band The Wedding Present (George Best) and American band The Strokes (Is This It) as some of his personal musical highlights.

The Smiths have remained a core fixture of his playlists, reflecting both his personal taste and the cultural heritage of the region he governed. Following his transition to national leadership and appointment as UK Prime Minister, a video clip of him DJing quickly circulated on platforms like TikTok with the caption, "You're watching the current UK Prime Minister's DJ set". In the footage, Burnham is seen singing along to the band's single, "There Is A Light That Never Goes Out," alongside an energetic crowd. The timing of the post led many online users to believe the celebratory DJ appearance occurred during the early days of his premiership.

Independent fact-checkers, including the Press Association and The Independent, subsequently verified that the viral clip was not current. Cross-referencing stage signage confirmed the footage was actually recorded on Friday, 19 July 2024, at an "All My Friends" club night event in Manchester. While the social media captions accurately identified his ultimate status as Prime Minister, the event occurred two years prior while he was still serving his mayoral term.

== Manchesterism ==
Manchesterism is the political philosophy and the policy agenda followed by British Prime Minister and Labour Party leader Andy Burnham during his tenure as mayor of Greater Manchester from 2017 to 2026.

Burnham has characterised Manchesterism as "the end of neoliberalism", "business-friendly socialism" and "a modern and functional response to the high-inequality, low-growth trap that came from the 1980s drive to privatise economic power and overcentralise political power in the Treasury". In a speech to the Centre for Cities, Burnham described it as a perspective that aimed to combine economic development with social benefits, with policies designed to explicitly channel the proceeds of growth towards communities, rejecting trickle-down economics. Cited as a social democratic politician, examples of such policies he referred to included re-establishing public control of buses through the creation of the Bee Network, and the Good Growth Fund, which provided £1 billion for three projects in each of Greater Manchester's boroughs. He stressed that such initiatives were only possible due to devolution, countering historical trends of political centralisation, and he also advocated for increased devolution of fiscal powers.

=== Background and development ===
Greater Manchester's experience with devolution since the early 2010s, including the formation of the Greater Manchester Combined Authority, provided the context for these policies. Burnham's mayoralty built on earlier regeneration efforts under figures like Richard Leese and Howard Bernstein.

In a September 2025 interview with The New Statesman, Burnham expressed an interest in reclaiming the phrase "Manchesterism" from its historical connotation with economic liberalism and free trade, named for Manchester's status as a textile manufacture hub in the 19th century. Journalist Tom McTague described Burnham's conception of Manchesterism as "a form of consensual, business-friendly socialism that seeks to retake public control of all essential services, from housing to transport, in order to make life "doable" for those trapped in the insecure world of Britain's outsourced Serco economy." Manchesterism has been presented as a model for balancing growth with equity, with stronger employment and economic performance in the city-region relative to national averages in certain periods.

Burnham has also argued that the cost-of-living crisis of the 2020s has roots in neoliberalism, suggesting that the deregulation and privatisation of the 1980s led to increases in the costs of essential goods, noting the effects of Right to Buy on an unregulated rental sector resulting in increasing state expenditure on Housing Benefit. He contends that such problems were exacerbated by government austerity and Brexit. Manchesterism has also been characterised as embodying collaboration and partnership working between stakeholders, including cooperation between government, business and trade unions, different public services, community groups, and administrations of different political complexions among Greater Manchester's borough councils. Burnham's political positions have also been described as being in line with social democracy, investing in public services, building more social housing, giving people control over infrastructure and an opposition to fully opposing capitalism and financial markets.

The Guardian cited the Labour Mainstream group as a proponent of Manchesterism.

=== Commentary ===
Commentators have noted its pragmatic, place-first character. Writing for the Financial Times in May 2026, Stephen Bush argued that Burnham's record as mayor of Greater Manchester had been to the right of the Starmer ministry but the policy offer he was making as a prospective Labour Party leader was more to the left; he suggested that this may be due to the institutional constraints on and weaknesses of the metro mayor role. In a January 2026 piece for the London Review of Books, Michael Chessum compared Manchesterism's emphasis on moving away from neoliberalism to the approaches to governance advocated by the socialist parties of Spain and Portugal. Upon Burnham's return to Parliament following the Makerfield by-election, Manchesterism became more subject to discussion about it becoming a new mode of governing, particularly as it pertains to devolution, public service reforms, and regional economic strategy.

Senior reporter at Manchester Evening News Stephen Topping remarked "there's a horrifically overused phrase about our city and how it 'does things differently'.", in reference to the quote about Manchester commonly attributed to Tony Wilson. He continued, "It was repeated, for the umpteenth time, at a speech for the Institute of Fiscal Studies back in January. This time, mayor Andy Burnham was the culprit". In light of Burnham's promise to adhere to Chancellor Rachel Reeves' fiscal rules, Cameron Bailie for The Canary questioned the extent of Manchesterism's departure from neoliberalism, asking "Can you really challenge neoliberalism while simultaneously reassuring bond markets, protecting fiscal rules, and refusing to confront financiers?".

Former Conservative minister Justine Greening welcomed Burnham's vision of Manchesterism, particularly its commitments to "good growth". In an op-ed for The Guardian, Greening claimed that "Boris Johnson wasted my levelling up idea", but argued that Burnham's government seemed to have the "focus on delivery" that could potentially make a success of its aspirations for "good growth in every postcode".

== Post-mayoralty ==
=== End of mayoralty ===
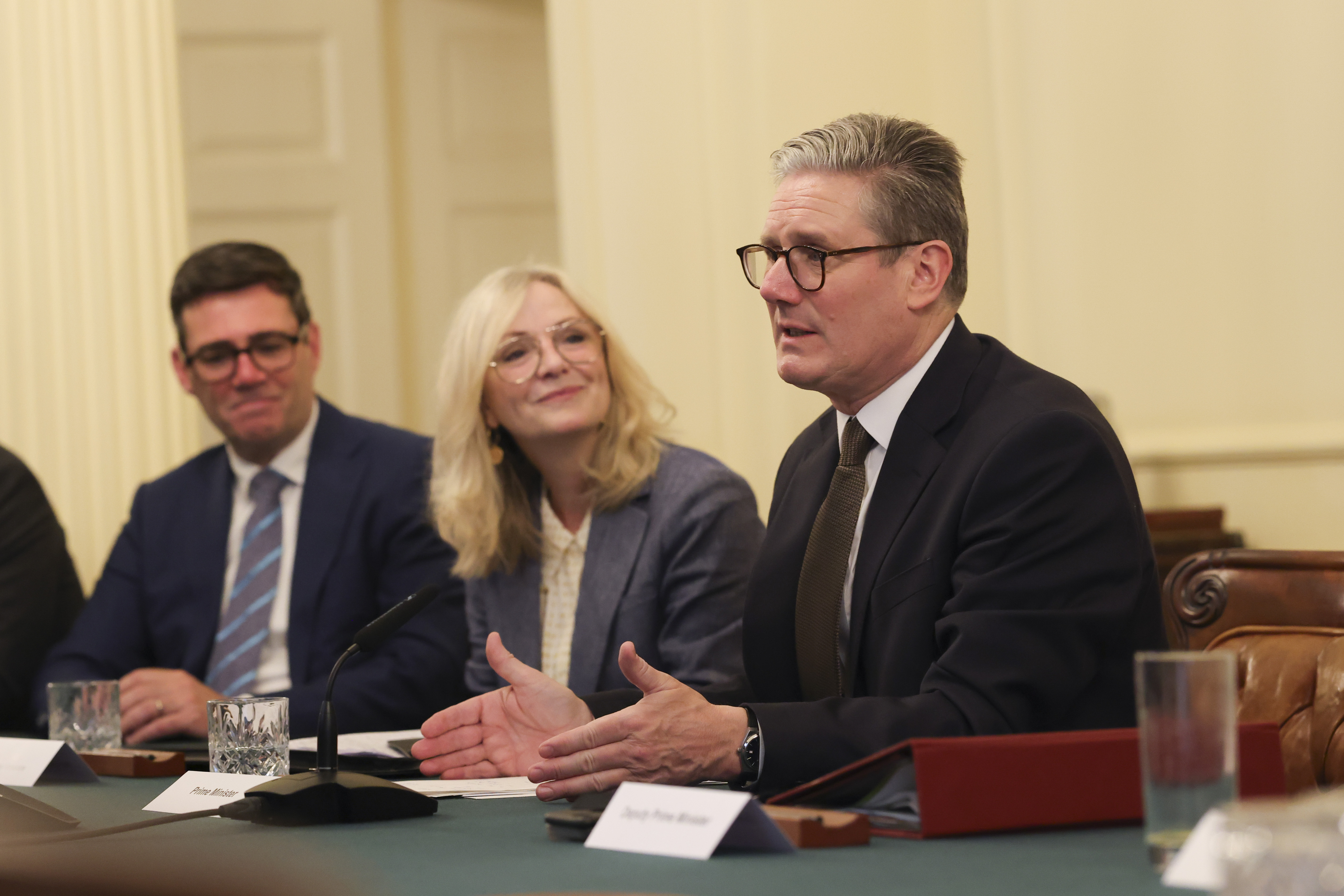
Burnham (left) in a meeting with Mayor of West Yorkshire Tracy Brabin and Prime Minister Keir Starmer, July 2024

Following Burnham's landslide re-election in 2021, he emerged as the bookmakers' favourite to become the next Labour leader. Asked about his ambitions, Burnham said his role as mayor was his priority, but made himself available in case "they [Labour] needed me one day in the future". In September 2023, Burnham was ranked twelfth on the New Statesman's Left Power List, described as a "key dissenter" and a "crucial voice" in the party, as well as a potential future party leader. Keir Starmer, whom Burnham supported during the 2020 leadership election, went on to win the 2024 general election, returning Labour to government. During the Sky News 2024 general election night broadcast, Burnham served as a guest analyst alongside former Scottish Conservatives leader Ruth Davidson. While Starmer's honeymoon period was brief, Burnham maintained high approval in Greater Manchester and, by August 2025, polls identified Burnham as the most popular senior Labour figure.

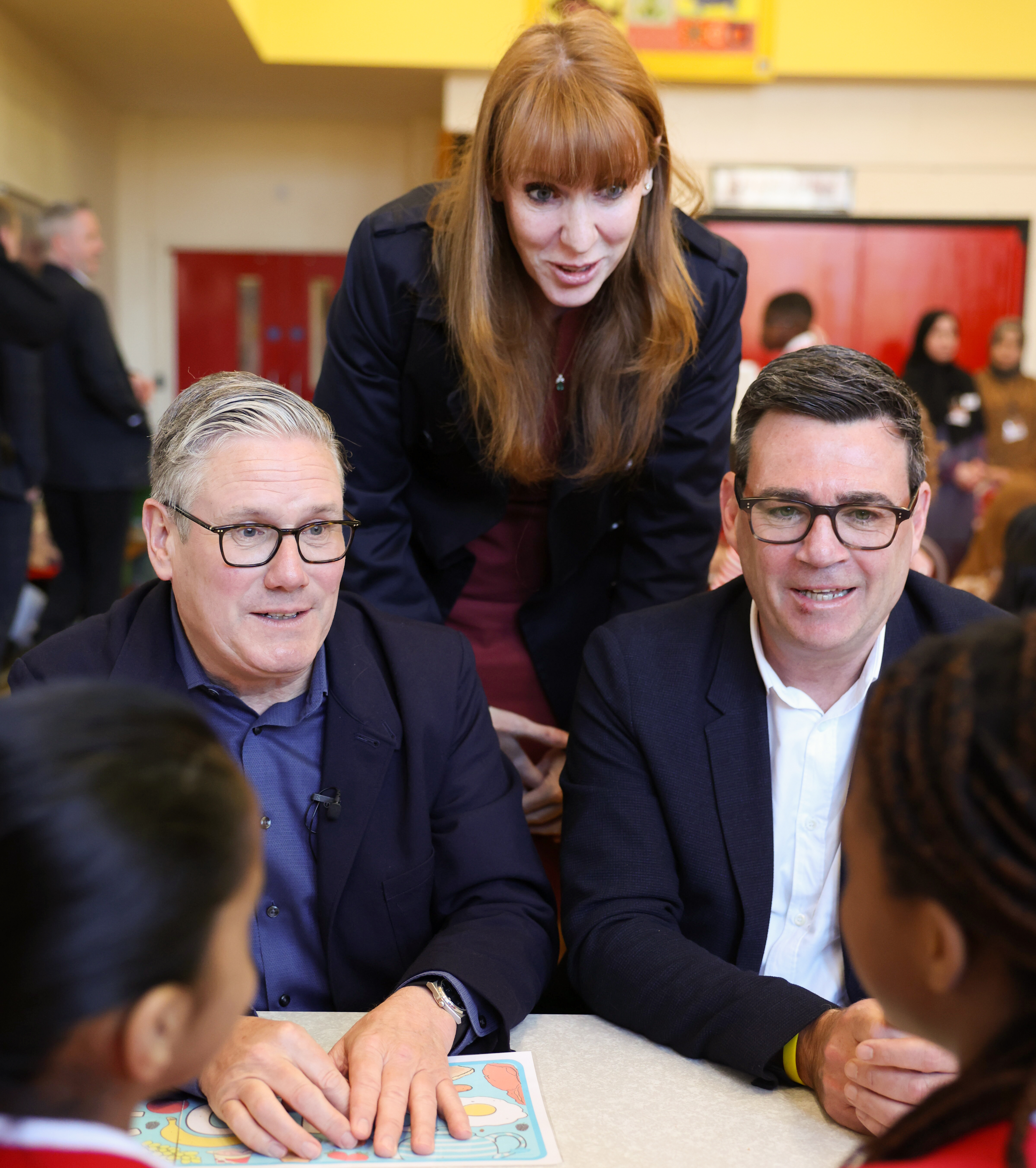
Burnham (right) with Keir Starmer and Angela Rayner during a primary school visit, April 2026

On 24 January 2026, Burnham applied to stand as Labour's candidate in the 2026 Gorton and Denton by-election, but was blocked in an 8–1 vote by the NEC on 25 January 2026. The by-election was ultimately won by the Green candidate Hannah Spencer. Burnham had previously beaten Spencer in the 2024 mayoral election by a margin of 375,000 votes. The Labour Party's poor performance in the 2026 local elections led to a crisis around Starmer's leadership, during which Burnham was widely speculated to succeed Starmer as prime minister and Labour leader. On 11 May, Angela Rayner said that the NEC blocking Burnham's return to parliament was a mistake. Burnham travelled to London on 12 May to meet MPs. Following Burnham's by-election victory in Makerfield and subsequent return to parliament in June 2026, Burnham was automatically disqualified as Mayor of Greater Manchester on 19 June 2026, since MPs are not allowed to hold the office of a mayor with police and crime commissioner powers. The resulting mayoral by-election was set for 30 July 2026, with the winner due to serve until May 2028. Paul Dennett, the mayor of Salford and Burnham's deputy mayor, served as acting mayor until Bev Craig was elected.

On Burnham stepping down as mayor, the local Manchester Evening News (MEN) newspaper gave him positive ratings for economic development and action on homelessness, although it felt he had not been as successful with police management. Its polling reported that he had a 65% approval rating, while YouGov polling indicated that 66% of Greater Manchester residents believed he did a good job during his mayoralty. Jennifer Williams, who covered Burnham for the MEN and Financial Times, felt that Burnham had joined a longstanding "economic project dating back to the 1980s" to boost Manchester's economy and national standing, but had "injected a zeal into defining the city...to the masses" that increased its profile nationally while managing a "byzantine system" of different local authorities and bus operators, and was "loved by his workforce". She felt his career had faced more difficulties with bridging a divide between "Greater Manchester's resurgent city centre and its struggling post-industrial towns" and a tendency to "respond emotionally" to issues like homelessness "and leave the detail for later".

=== Post-mayoralty career in politics ===
On 22 June 2026, Starmer announced that he would stand down as prime minister, remaining in office until a new leader was elected. In response to Burnham's subsequent announcement that he would stand in the ensuing leadership election, Wes Streeting endorsed him, a move which led political experts to conclude the election would be a "coronation" more than a formal contest, as Streeting had been considered Burnham's most likely opponent. Burnham was sworn in as an MP later the same day, with BBC News and Sky News covering his entire train journey from Manchester to London.

Burnham was already widely seen as Starmer's likely successor; he was the only declared candidate and had received a significant number of endorsements. Burnham secured nominations from 349 MPs for the leadership election. By 13 July, he was the only candidate nominated, and it was mathematically impossible for anyone else to stand (under Labour rules, a leadership candidate must be nominated by 20 per cent of the party's MPs in order to stand). He was therefore elected unopposed on 17 July.

As the leader of the majority party in the House of Commons, Burnham was appointed prime minister, First Lord of the Treasury and Minister for the Civil Service by King Charles III on 20 July 2026. Burnham and his wife, Marie-France van Heel, were driven from Buckingham Palace to Downing Street. Upon taking office, Burnham became the first prime minister to belong to the Co-operative Party.
