= 2028 Greater Manchester mayoral election =

- 4 May 2028
Incumbent Mayor
Bev Craig
Labour Co-op

The 2028 Greater Manchester mayoral election is scheduled to be held on 4 May 2028 to elect the Mayor of Greater Manchester.

It will be the first election in the normal four-year cycle after the 2026 Greater Manchester mayoral by-election.

The election will take place the same day as council elections within the city region, including the election for the Mayor of Salford, as well as other mayoral elections in England.

== Background ==
The Mayor of Greater Manchester serves as the directly elected leader of the Greater Manchester Combined Authority. The Mayor has power over an investment directly to the combined authority from the government of £30 million a year for 30 years from 2017. The Mayor also incorporates the Police and Crime Commissioner role of the Greater Manchester Police into their post. In addition to these, the mayor has authority over strategic housing planning, transport, adult education and skills, social care and others.

The first ever election was held in 2017. The Labour candidate Andy Burnham was elected as the inaugural mayor, and he has been re-elected in two subsequent Greater Manchester mayoral elections - 2021 and 2024. In 2026, Burnham applied to be the Labour Party candidate in the 2026 Gorton and Denton by-election but his candidacy was blocked by the party's National Executive Committee. During the 2026 Labour Party leadership crisis surrounding Keir Starmer, Burnham was elected as an MP in the Makerfield by-election, and subsequently disqualified as Mayor of Greater Manchester triggering a mayoral by-election, which Labour candidate Bev Craig won.

All registered electors living in Greater Manchester aged 16 or over on 4 May 2028 will be entitled to vote in the mayoral election. Those who are temporarily away from Greater Manchester (for example, away working, on holiday, in student accommodation or in hospital) will also be entitled to vote in the mayoral election. The deadline to register to vote in the election will be announced nearer the election.
