= 2028 English mayoral elections =

- 4 May 2028

14 out of 20 strategic authority mayors
| | Majority party | Minority party | Third party |
|---|---|---|---|
| Party | Labour | Conservative | Reform |
| Seats before | 10 (9 up for election) | 2 (1 up for election) | 2 (0 up for election) |
| | Fourth party | Fifth party |
| Party | Liberal Democrats | Green |
| Seats before | 0 | 0 |
- Labour incumbent Conservative incumbent Newly-created mayoralty Not up for election in 2028

Mayoral elections are scheduled to be held on 4 May 2028 to elect 14 of the 20 strategic authority mayors in England, four of them newly-established. They will be held at the same time as local council elections in England.

== Background ==
The title "mayor" is an old one in the English local government system. Borough councils traditionally had mayors, indirectly elected from amongst council members. Where these still exist they are now ceremonial roles. Some local councils also have directly-elected mayors.

Strategic authority mayors have been created over time since 2000. They are the executive of strategic authorities, a term applied retrospectively in the English Devolution and Community Empowerment Act 2026 to existing structures. They are sometimes known as "metro mayors", "regional mayors" or "devolved mayors", reflecting that the first wave of mayors covered metropolitan areas, some cover larger regions, and their role in implementing devolution in England. The mayors sit on the Mayoral Council for England, and also on the Council of the Nations and Regions.

As of 2026, there are 14 strategic authority mayors in England. Two more strategic authority mayors will be first elected in 2027, and four more will be first elected in 2028, bringing the total number of strategic authority mayors up to 20 from 2028.

Fourteen out of the twenty mayors will be up for election for four-year terms in 2028. The other six are elected on different cycles, being elected in 2027 or 2029 instead.

There are additionally a further two strategic authorities which do not have mayors, known as "foundation strategic authorities".

== Electoral system ==
The mayoral elections are expected to use the supplementary vote system, which was reintroduced with the English Devolution and Community Empowerment Act 2026 and had previously been used until 2022. Between 2022 and 2026, mayoral elections used the first past the post system, due to the Elections Act 2022.

In the supplementary vote system, voters express a first and a second preference of candidates.

- If a candidate receives over 50% of the first preference vote the candidate wins.
- If no candidate receives an overall majority, i.e., over 50% of first preference votes, the top two candidates proceed to a second round and all other candidates are eliminated.
- The first preference votes for the remaining two candidates stand in the final count.
- Voters' ballots whose first and second preference candidates are eliminated are discarded.
- Voters whose first preference candidates have been eliminated and whose second preference candidate is in the top two have their second preference votes added to the count.

This means that the winning candidate has the support of a majority of voters who expressed a preference among the top two.

All registered electors (British, Irish, Commonwealth and European Union citizens) living in the mayoral strategic authority, aged 18 or over on 4 May 2028, are entitled to vote in the mayoral elections.

Mayors serve four-year terms, with the 14 mayors elected in 2028 serving until 2032. The other six strategic authorities elect mayors on a different four-year cycle, with four having been elected in 2025 and two being elected in 2027.

== Summary ==
| 2028 election | Incumbent mayor and party | | Last election | Candidates | | | | | |
| 2028 election | Incumbent mayor and party | | Last election | Labour | Conservative | Reform UK | Liberal Democrats | Green | Others |
|---|---|---|---|---|---|---|---|---|---|
| East Midlands | Claire Ward | Labour Co-operative | 40.3% | | | | | | |
| Greater Essex | Newly-created position | | | Adam Fox | Louise McKinlay | Peter Harris | James Allen | Natasha Osben | James Miller (Southend Confelicity Party) |
| Greater Manchester | Bev Craig | Labour Co-operative | 66.3% | | | | | | |
| Hampshire and the Solent | Newly-created position | | | Lorna Fielker | Donna Jones | | Martin Tod | Anna Collar | |
| Liverpool City Region | Steve Rotheram | Labour | 68.0% | | | | | | |
| London | Sadiq Khan | Labour | 43.8% | | James Cleverly | Laila Cunningham | | | |
| Norfolk and Suffolk | Newly-created position | | | Carli Harper | Tim Passmore | David Bick | Kevin Keable | Caroline Topping | David Beavan (independent) |
| North East | Kim McGuinness | Labour Co-operative | 41.3% | | | | | | |
| South Yorkshire | Oliver Coppard | Labour Co-operative | 50.9% | | | | | | |
| Sussex and Brighton | Newly-created position | | | Caroline Baxter | Katy Bourne | Paul Linehan | Ben Dempsey | Rachel Millward | Martin Webb (independent) |
| Tees Valley | Ben Houchen | Conservative | 53.6% | | | | | | |
| West Midlands | Richard Parker | Labour Co-operative | 37.8% | | | | | | |
| West Yorkshire | Tracy Brabin | Labour Co-operative | 50.4% | | | | | | |
| York and North Yorkshire | David Skaith | Labour Co-operative | 35.1% | | | | | | |
