= 2024 Greater Manchester mayoral election =

- 2 May 2024
- Opinion polls
- Registered: 2,088,644
- Turnout: 32.1% (▼2.6 pp)
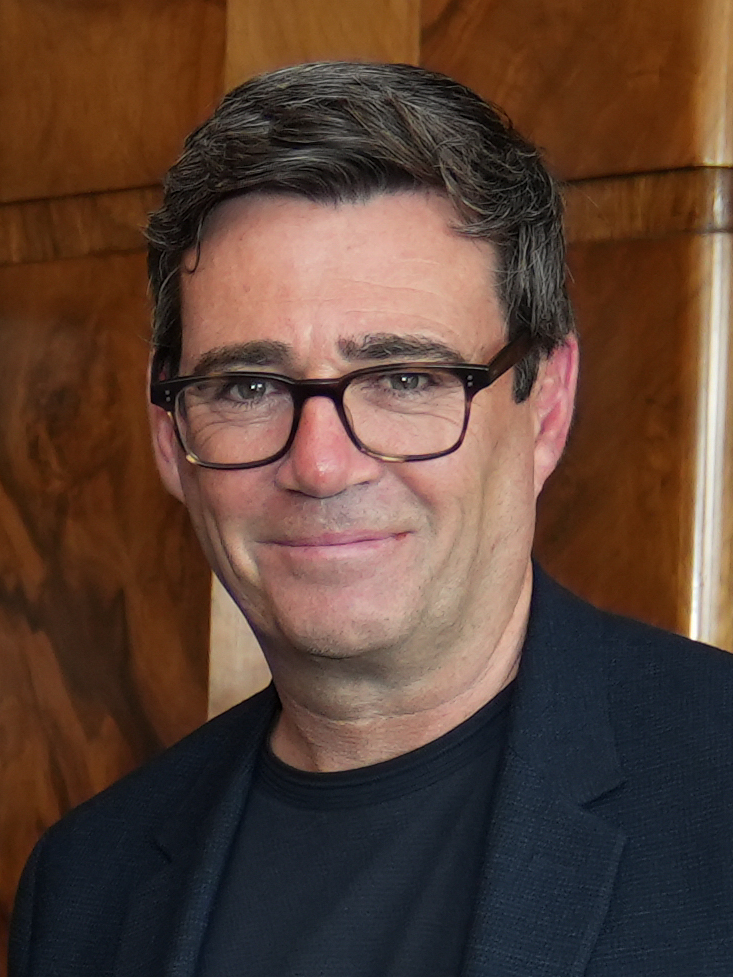

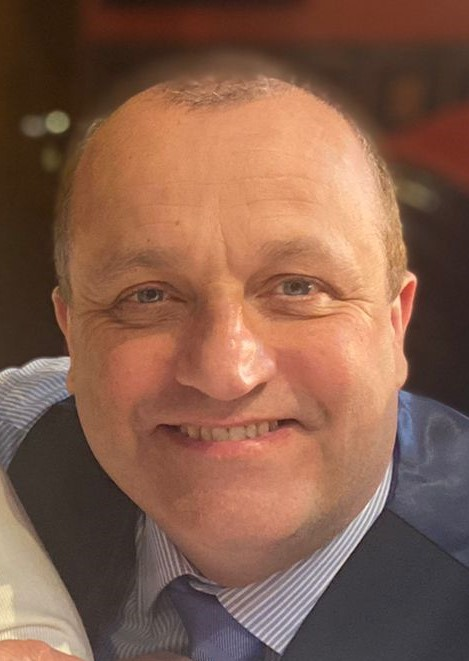

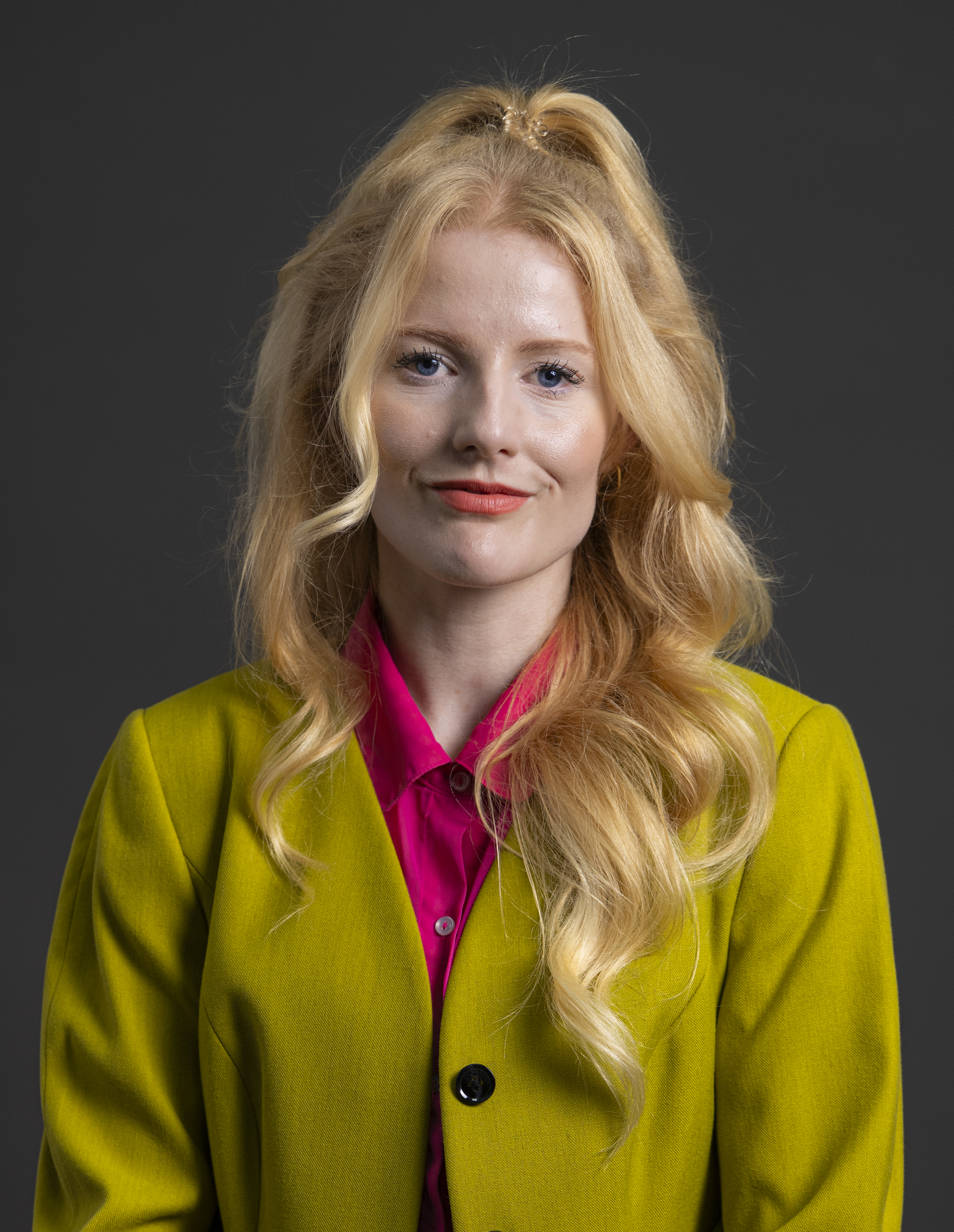
Candidate	Andy Burnham	Laura Evans	Nick Buckley
Party	Labour Co-op	Conservative	Independent
Popular vote	420,749	68,946	50,304
Percentage	63.4%	10.4%	7.6%
Swing	▼3.9pp	▼9.2pp	New
Candidate	Dan Barker	Hannah Spencer
Party	Reform	Green
Popular vote	49,532	45,905
Percentage	7.5%	6.9%
Swing	▲4.8pp	▲2.5pp
- Results by district
Mayor before election
Andy Burnham
Labour Co-op
Elected Mayor
Andy Burnham
Labour Co-op

The 2024 Greater Manchester mayoral election was held on 2 May 2024 to elect the mayor of Greater Manchester. The election took place alongside local elections across England and Wales, including council elections within the city region and for the mayor of Salford.

Andy Burnham of the Labour and Co-operative Party was re-elected with 420,749 votes (63.40%) with a turnout of 32.05%.

== Background ==
The mayor of Greater Manchester serves as the directly elected leader of the Greater Manchester Combined Authority. The mayor has power over an investment directly to the combined authority from the government of £30 million a year for 30 years from 2017. The post of mayor also incorporates that of police and crime commissioner of the Greater Manchester Police. In addition to these functions, the mayor has authority over strategic housing planning, transport, adult education and skills, social care, and other matters.

The first election for the position was held in 2017. The Labour candidate Andy Burnham was elected as the inaugural mayor; he was successful in his bid for re-election in 2021 with 67% of the vote in the first round.

As mayor, Burnham introduced the Bee Network, a transport network involving franchising all buses in Greater Manchester, with pricing capped and integrated with trams and plans to include local trains.

He also developed a "Greater Manchester Good Landlord Charter", with plans to let tenants request council inspections and more funding for enforcement.

== Electoral system ==
This election was the only one in Manchester to use first-past-the-post to elect the mayor, as a result of the changes made by the Elections Act 2022; previous elections in 2017 and 2021 had used the supplementary vote system. Voters were able to vote for a single candidate, with the candidate receiving the most votes being elected mayor. The subsequent by-election in 2026 reverted to the supplementary vote system as a result of the English Devolution and Community Empowerment Act 2026.

All registered electors living in Greater Manchester aged 18 or over on 2 May 2024 were entitled to vote in the mayoral election. Those who were temporarily away from Greater Manchester (for example, away working, on holiday, in student accommodation or in hospital) were also entitled to vote in the mayoral election. The deadline to register to vote in the election was Tuesday 16 April 2024.

== Campaign ==
The incumbent mayor Andy Burnham said he would never introduce a Clean Air Zone (CAZ), instead seeking funding for electric buses and taxis. He said he would retain cameras that had been installed for a previously proposed CAZ to give footage to police. Dan Barker, the former Conservative candidate, said he would remove the cameras.

The Liberal Democrat candidate Jake Austin said he would reverse cuts to local bus services.

== Candidates ==
=== Labour Party ===
Andy Burnham has been the mayor of Greater Manchester since 2017 and before that the Member of Parliament (MP) for Leigh from 2001 to 2017. There was speculation that Burnham might stand for election to become an MP so he could become a candidate in a future Labour leadership election. Burnham repeatedly stated that he would complete a full second term of the mayoralty but did not specify beyond that point. Before becoming mayor, he had been a candidate for Labour Party leadership in 2010 and 2015. After joining the Labour Party in January 2022, the former professional footballer Gary Neville was linked with a potential candidacy to become Greater Manchester mayor, which he refused to rule out.

In early 2023, Burnham confirmed his intent to run for a third term as mayor. Unlike his second, he did not complete a third term, due to the 2026 Labour Leadership Crisis.

=== Conservative Party ===
On 22 March 2024, the Conservatives selected Laura Evans as their candidate after their prior candidate, Dan Barker, defected to Reform UK. Evans also stood for the Conservatives in the 2021 election and previously served as a Councillor on Trafford Council for Village Ward.

=== Green Party ===
On 25 March 2024, the Green Party's candidate Hannah Spencer, a councillor for Hale in Trafford since 2023, announced her selection as their candidate for Mayor. While ultimately unsuccessful, Spencer later won the 2026 Gorton and Denton by-election after Burnham's own candidacy was controversially blocked.

=== Liberal Democrats ===
On 1 March 2024, the Liberal Democrats announced that they had selected Jake Austin, a councillor for Hazel Grove in Stockport since 2023, as their candidate for mayor.

=== Reform UK ===
The original Conservative candidate Dan Barker, a former Conservative Party activist from Sale who has worked as a project manager, defected to Reform UK on 21 March 2024 and stood as its candidate.

=== Independent and other candidates ===
Nick Buckley, a charity worker who ran as the Reform UK candidate in the 2021 mayoral election, announced his intention to stand as an independent candidate. He said he wanted Bolton to secede from Greater Manchester and become administratively part of Lancashire.

Don Prof Reis Abraham Halliwell Prf attempted to register as an independent candidate, however his nomination was invalid as it was not subscribed as required by law. He previously stood as a candidate in the Heaton Lostock and Chew Moor ward during the 2023 Bolton Metropolitan Borough Council election.

George Galloway was reported as considering standing in the election. He denied that he would run, instead stating his ambition to run in 2028.

== Opinion polling ==
Dates conducted	Pollster	Client	Sample size	Burnham Lab	Barker Reform	Buckley Ind	Evans Con	Austin Lib Dems	Spencer Green	Others	Lead
2 May 2024	2024 election		–	63.4%	7.5%	7.6%	10.4%	4.2%	6.9	–	53.0
19–24 Apr 2024	More in Common	N/A	2,017	63%	12%	9%	9%	4%	4%	–	51
6 May 2021	2021 election		–	67.3%	2.7%	–	19.6%	3.2%	4.4%	2.9%	47.7

== Results ==
2024 Greater Manchester mayoral election
Party	Candidate	Votes	%	±%
Labour Co-op	Andy Burnham	420,749	63.4	▼3.9
Conservative	Laura Evans	68,946	10.4	▼9.2
Independent	Nick Buckley	50,304	7.6	New
Reform	Dan Barker	49,532	7.5	▲4.8
Green	Hannah Spencer	45,905	6.9	▲2.5
Liberal Democrats	Jake Austin	28,195	4.2	▲1.0
Majority		351,803	53.0	
Rejected ballots		5,863	0.9	
Turnout		669,494	32.1	▼2.7
Registered electors		2,088,644		
Labour Co-op hold		Swing	▲2.7	

2024 Greater Manchester mayoral election rejected ballots
Reason	Number	Percentage of total votes*
Want of an official mark	4	0.001
Voting for more than one candidate	751	0.113
Writing or mark which voter could be identified	104	0.016
Unmarked or void for uncertainty	5,004	0.754
Total	5,863	0.883

* Including total rejected ballots.

=== Results by Borough ===
Local authority	Labour		Conservative		Green		Liberal Democrats		Reform		Independents	
Local authority	#	%	#	%	#	%	#	%	#	%	#	%
Bolton	38,759	57.8%	8,918	13.3%	5,809	8.7%	1,945	2.9%	6,464	9.6%	5,140	7.7%
Bury	32,238	61.1%	8,112	15.4%	2,682	5.1%	1,327	2.5%	4,262	8.1%	4,175	7.9%
Manchester	79,631	71.9%	4,914	4.4%	11,514	10.4%	4,613	4.2%	4,213	3.8%	5,843	5.3%
Oldham	28,655	49.2%	5,349	9.2%	5,041	8.7%	3,147	5.4%	4,632	7.9%	11,450	19.6%
Rochdale	31,211	58.2%	5,465	10.2%	3,522	6.6%	3,458	6.4%	4,651	8.7%	5,328	9.9%
Salford	34,748	68.1%	5,869	11.5%	3,059	6.0%	1,477	2.9%	3,711	7.3%	2,195	4.3%
Stockport	54,462	66.7%	8,124	9.9%	3,366	4.1%	7,313	9.0%	5,024	6.2%	3,391	4.2%
Tameside	30,710	61.3%	5,448	10.9%	4,068	8.1%	1,306	2.6%	4,600	9.2%	3,940	7.9%
Trafford	45,408	64.5%	11,300	16.1%	4,801	6.8%	2,244	3.2%	4,149	5.9%	2,475	3.5%
Wigan	44,927	66.1%	5,447	8.0%	2,043	3.0%	1,365	2.0%	7,826	11.5%	6,367	9.4%
Totals	420,749	63.4%	68,946	10.4%	45,905	6.9%	28,195	4.2%	49,532	7.5%	50,304	7.6%
Source: Greater Manchester Elects
