= 2026 Greater Manchester mayoral by-election =

Election in Britain

- 30 July 2026
- Opinion polls
- Registered: 2,142,779
- Turnout: 25.1% (▼7.0 pp)
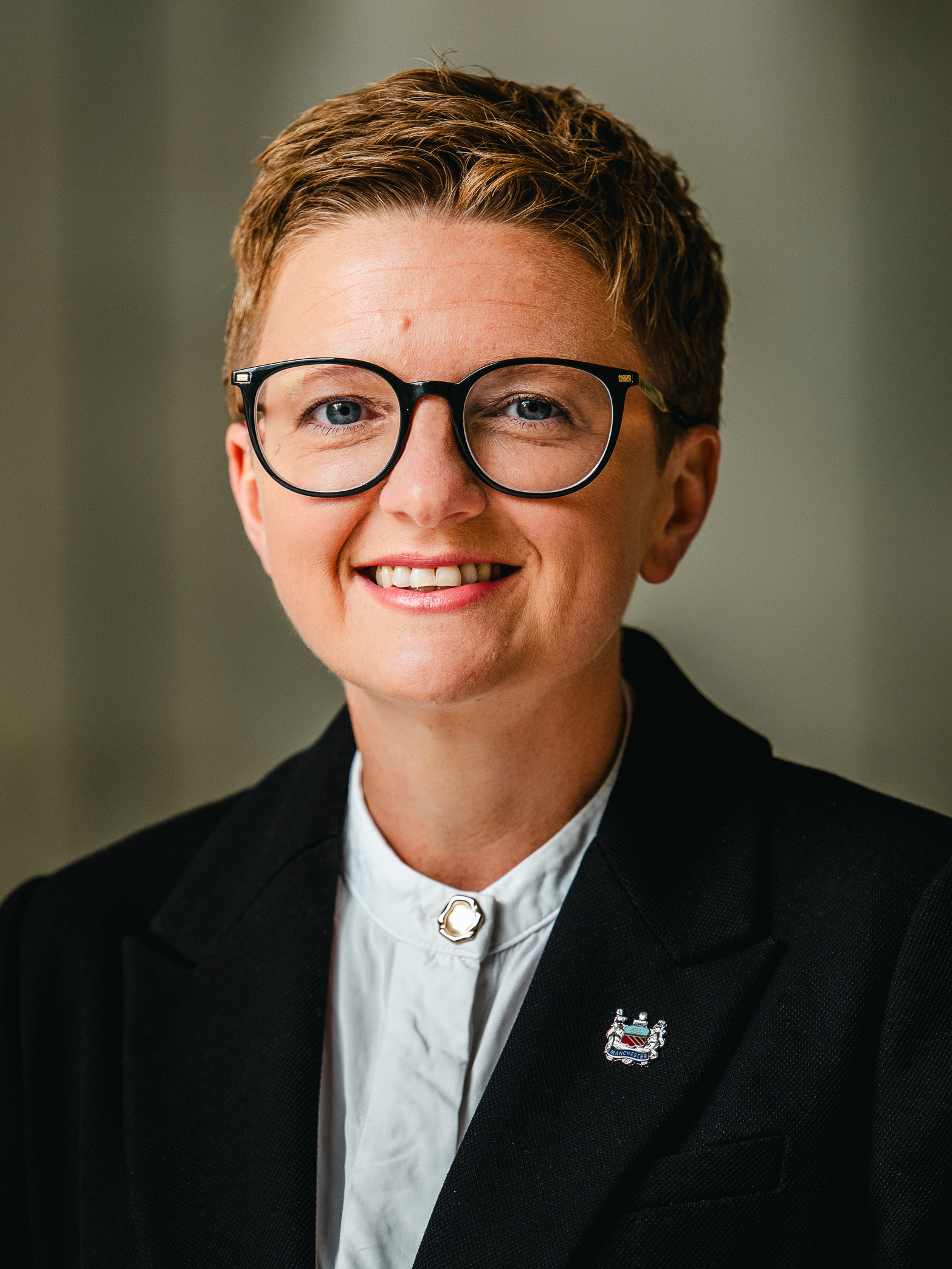

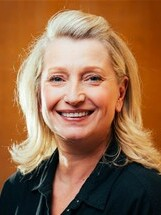

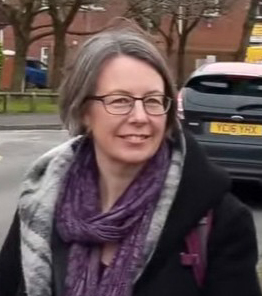
Candidate	Bev Craig	Sian Astley	Geraldine Coggins
Party	Labour Co-op	Reform	Green
First round	251,449	111,928	64,968
Percentage	47.1%	21.0%	12.2%
Swing	▼16.3pp	▲13.5pp	▲5.3pp
Second round	309,525	157,178	Eliminated
Percentage	66.3%	33.7%	Eliminated
Candidate	Marlon West	Phil Eckersley
Party	Restore	Conservative
First round	46,289	41,021
Percentage	8.7%	7.7%
Swing	New	▼2.7pp
Second round	Eliminated	Eliminated
Mayor before election
Paul Dennett (acting) (Note: The powers and functions of the mayor were exercised and performed by the Deputy Mayor Paul Dennett after the end of Andy Burnham's term on 19 June pending the election of a new mayor.)
Labour
Elected Mayor
Bev Craig
Labour Co-op

A by-election was held on 30 July 2026 to elect the Mayor of Greater Manchester. The by-election was triggered by Andy Burnham's disqualification from the post after winning the 2026 Makerfield by-election and thus becoming a member of Parliament. The winner of the by-election will serve as mayor until the 2028 mayoral election. The prior acting mayor, Paul Dennett, did not stand for election.

The by-election was the first in the United Kingdom for a strategic authority mayor, and the biggest by-election ever held in the United Kingdom. The by-election was held using the supplementary vote (SV) system like all previous Greater Manchester mayoral elections except the 2024 election, which used the first-past-the-post system.

Bev Craig retained the mayoralty for the Labour Party with a reduced majority and on a reduced turnout of 25.1%.

Counting occurred in the Co-op Live arena.

== Background ==
The Mayor of Greater Manchester serves as the directly elected leader of the Greater Manchester Combined Authority. The Mayor has power over an investment directly to the combined authority from the government of £30 million a year for 30 years from 2017. The Mayor also incorporates the police and crime commissioner role of the Greater Manchester Police into their post. In addition to these, the mayor has authority over strategic housing planning, transport, adult education and skills, social care and other issues.

The first election was held in 2017. The Labour candidate Andy Burnham was elected as the inaugural mayor, and he was re-elected in 2021 and 2024. In 2026, Burnham applied to be the Labour Party candidate in the 2026 Gorton and Denton by-election but his candidacy was blocked by the party's National Executive Committee. During the 2026 Labour Party leadership crisis surrounding Keir Starmer, Burnham was selected as the Labour Party candidate in the Makerfield by-election, which he won comfortably. Burnham subsequently became Prime Minister, succeeding Starmer whom he had previously supported during the 2020 leadership election.

Mayors of combined authorities that hold police and crime commissioner powers are disqualified if they become a member of Parliament, triggering a mayoral by-election. 30 July 2026 was identified before the Makerfield by-election as the likely date for the by-election, and was confirmed by the Greater Manchester Combined Authority the morning the Makerfield result was announced. The normal cycle for Greater Manchester mayoral elections is once every four years and the 2028 Greater Manchester mayoral election is still scheduled to take place: the candidate elected in 2026 will serve until the 2028 election.

With an electorate of over two million people, it was the by-election with the largest electorate ever held in the United Kingdom. (Note: The number of registered voters in the 2024 Greater Manchester mayoral election was 2,088,644.) It was the first strategic authority mayor by-election and the cost of holding it was expected to be £4.7 million.

== Electoral system ==
While the 2024 election was conducted using the first-past-the-post system to elect the mayor, the English Devolution and Community Empowerment Act 2026 re-introduced the Supplementary Vote system which had been used for all prior Greater Manchester mayoral elections. Voters were able to vote for two candidates, expressing a first and second preference. If a candidate receives more than 50% of first preference votes, they are elected mayor. If no candidate breaks the 50% threshold, all but the top two candidates are eliminated and the votes for the eliminated candidates are re-allocated to their second preference if cast for either of the two remaining candidates. After all second preference votes are counted and added to the first preference tallies, the candidate among the remaining two who has the most votes is declared the winner and elected. In the election, the candidates in the second round were Bev Craig and Sian Astley.

All electors registered to vote in Greater Manchester aged 18 or over were entitled to vote in the mayoral by-election, including those who were temporarily away from Greater Manchester (for example, away working, on holiday, in student accommodation or in hospital). The deadline to register to vote in the election was 14 July 2026, and 15 July 2026 for postal votes. Nominations for mayoral candidates closed on 3 July 2026.

== Campaign ==
Bev Craig, the Labour Party candidate, has promised to extend the cheap fares on the Bee Network, for example by expanding the £2 bus fare cap and making buses free for 11–18-year olds and disabled people. She also promised to use the tax income from growth in the city centre to fund investment in other towns in the county, to create jobs and distribute wealth and opportunity. Her main housing policy is building 50,000 new council homes and affordable homes, to reduce reliance on temporary accommodation. She has said these affordable homes will be capped at housing benefit rates by 2039. Professor Jon Tonge, political expert at the University of Liverpool, called affordable housing "a vulnerability for Labour". Craig has also promised to create a "Gen-Z commission" for the authority, and to ensure that every town has a youth centre available. When speaking at an LGBTQ+ hustings during the campaign, Craig said in her time in politics she has been "told maybe I should grow my hair or be less gay" as an experience of being "one of the most visible lesbians in politics". Craig has said that skyscrapers remain a major issue in Manchester, promising to use the Housing Investment Fund for affordable homes, which the Financial Times states Burnham did not do.

Sian Astley, the Reform UK candidate, promised to "go to war" with Vape shops and barbers' shops which are "dodgy", as part of a wider strengthening of Greater Manchester Police to become "the toughest force in Britain". Reform UK say they want to "stop the region becoming a dumping ground for illegal migrants". She expanded on immigration by saying, "Personally I’d just ensure the Green voters, uni-party MPs (present or past) and Cllrs house the illegal criminals, rapists and economic chancers [...]". Reform UK also want to triple the use of police stop and search and launch a review into the Clean Air Zone plans. On 6 July 2026, speaking of Burnham's time as mayor Astley said, "I think there are over 20,000 households on the Manchester housing register, and they haven't built social housing for decades". The Independent analysed official government figures and concluded that thousands of social and affordable homes have been built across the region during Mr Burnham's tenure. Reform UK told The Independent that Astley had "mis-spoke". Astley promised to stop funding the creation of bike lanes and to use JCB pothole-filling machines to deal with the number of potholes in the Greater Manchester area. However, The New World pointed out that JCB had donated £200,000 to Reform UK prior to the party beginning to promote their machinery, and that road repairs do not fall under the mayor of Greater Manchester's responsibilities. On 9 July, Reform UK urged its party activists to shift their focus from the mayoral by-election to support party leader Nigel Farage in the 2026 Clacton by-election.

Green Party candidate, Geraldine Coggins, said her main priority as mayor would be to make everyday life across Greater Manchester more affordable for ordinary people. One of her pledges is to purchase 10,000 existing homes to be refurbished and made available to let quickly, while 10,000 new publicly-owned homes are being built, resulting in 20,000 affordable and publicly owned homes over a decade. Coggins manifesto also says she will demand Westminster brings in rent controls, saving renters £2,400 a year and saving the Treasury £2 billion a year in housing benefits. Coggins would introduce "Bee Orbit", high-frequency express orbital bus routes linking towns such as Rochdale, Oldham, Tameside, Stockport, Bolton, Bury and Wigan, make bus travel free for everyone under the age of 22, and prioritise walking, wheeling and cycling infrastructure. Coggins supports extending Didsbury tramline into Stockport, saying she would push for the tram to go "as far as it can go", but that, "trams are an expensive and slow solution. Buses and active transport [walking, scooting, and cycling] can be done so much cheaper and have an enormous impact much quicker and much cheaper. Trams are part of the solution but not the whole solution". In regards to the high street, Coggins would, "revive high streets with a £10 million fund to help councils and community groups take over empty shops".

== Candidates ==
The Conservative Party announced on 28 June that Phil Eckersley, a Trafford Councillor and deputy leader of Trafford Conservatives, would be its candidate. The Green Party of England and Wales announced Geraldine Coggins, the leader of the Green Party group on Trafford Council, as its candidate on 20 June. The Labour Party announced Bev Craig, leader of Manchester City Council since 2021, as its candidate on 23 June. The Liberal Democrats announced Richard Kilpatrick, a councillor for Didsbury West on Manchester City Council, as its candidate on 25 June.

Reform UK announced on 29 June that landlord and businesswoman Sian Astley would be its candidate. Astley owns 17 small flats across three properties in south Manchester. Astley is also a Manchester City Councillor, representing the Baguley ward and is the group leader for Reform UK. Restore Britain announced Marlon West, a former nurse and campaigner against child sexual exploitation, whose daughter had been raped and tortured by a grooming gang, as its candidate on 22 June. West had been suspended and then quit his job as a nurse following a private discussion in a Facebook group chat where he described what happened to his daughter being deemed as "[not] treat[ing] people of all races and nationalities with dignity and respect" by the Nursing and Midwifery Council.

The official Statement of Persons Nominated was published by GMCA on 6 July. It included all the above candidates who had already announced their intention to stand, plus Marcus Farmer, an independent. George Galloway had announced his intention to stand for the Workers Party of Britain and that he would end his self-imposed exile in Russia to do so. However, he was not nominated as a candidate.

== Opinion polling ==
Date(s) conducted	Pollster	Client	Sample size	Round (Note: As the supplementary vote system is used, pollsters may provide data for both possible first and/or second round outcomes.)	Lab	Con	Ref	Grn	LD	RB	Farmer	Others	Lead
30 Jul 2026	2026 Greater Manchester mayoral by-election			First	47.1%	7.7%	21.0%	12.2%	2.8%	8.7%	0.6%	—	26.1
30 Jul 2026	2026 Greater Manchester mayoral by-election			Second	66.3%	—	33.7%	—	—	—	—	—	32.6
11–23 Jul	More in Common	N/A	1,003	First	39%	12%	19%	14%	8%	8%	1%	—	20
11–23 Jul	More in Common	N/A	1,003	Second	65%	—	35%	—	—	—	—	—	30
8–15 Jul	YouGov	N/A	2,200	First	38%	11%	24%	17%	3%	7%	1%	—	14
8–15 Jul	YouGov	N/A	2,200	Second	62%	—	38%	—	—	—	—	—	24
7–13 Jul	Find Out Now	N/A	1,505	First	38%	8%	19%	22%	3%	9%	1%	—	16
7–13 Jul	Find Out Now	N/A	1,505	Second	64%	—	—	36%	—	—	—	—	28
7–13 Jul	Find Out Now	N/A	1,505	Second	66%	—	34%	—	—	—	—	—	32
22 May – 5 Jun (Note: Polling conducted before by-election called.)	FocalData	Hope Not Hate	1,143	First	33.2%	11.1%	30.1%	12.5%	7.6%	—	—	5.5%	3.1
2 May 2024	2024 Greater Manchester mayoral election (Note: Note this election took place under first-past-the-post.)				63.4%	10.4%	7.5%	6.9%	4.2%	—	—	7.6% Buckley 7.6%	53.0

== Usage ==
2026 Greater Manchester mayoral by-election
Party	Candidate	1st round		2nd round			1st round votesTransfer votes, 2nd round
Party	Candidate	Total	Of round	Transfers	Total	Of round	1st round votesTransfer votes, 2nd round
Labour Co-op	Bev Craig	251,449	47.1%	58,076	309,525	66.3%	
Reform	Sian Astley	111,928	21.0%	45,250	157,178	33.7%	
Green	Geraldine Coggins	64,968	12.2%				
Restore	Marlon West	46,289	8.7%				
Conservative	Phil Eckersley	41,021	7.7%				
Liberal Democrats	Richard Kilpatrick	14,702	2.8%				
Independent	Marcus Farmer	2,969	0.6%				
Majority					152,347	32.6%	
Turnout		538,659	25.1%	Exhausted ballots: 66,623			
Registered electors		2,142,779					

2026 Greater Manchester mayoral by-election rejected ballots
Reason	Number	Percentage of total votes*
Want of an official mark	6	0.001%
Voting for more than one candidate	4,432	0.823%
Writing or mark which voter could be identified	44	0.008%
Unmarked or void for uncertainty	846	0.157%
Total	5,328	0.989%

* Including total rejected ballots.

=== First preference results by borough ===
Local authority	Labour Co-Op		Reform		Green		Restore		Conservative		Liberal Democrats		Independent		Total valid votes	Rejected ballots		Turnout		Electorate
Local authority	#	%	#	%	#	%	#	%	#	%	#	%	#	%	Total valid votes	#	%	#	%	Electorate
Bolton	19,718	40.5%	12,524	25.7%	5,095	10.5%	4,820	9.9%	5,041	10.4%	1,016	2.1%	484	1.0%	48,698	515	1.0%	49,213	22.7%	217,169
Bury	18,837	46.9%	9,111	22.7%	3,309	8.2%	3,570	8.9%	4,515	11.2%	671	1.7%	188	0.5%	40,201	422	1.0%	40,623	28.2%	144,090
Manchester	49,326	54.0%	9,845	10.8%	21,909	24.0%	4,811	5.3%	2,439	2.7%	2,620	2.9%	436	0.5%	91,389	1,019	1.1%	92,408	22.7%	406,516
Oldham	15,170	41.6%	10,723	29.4%	3,105	8.5%	4,381	12.0%	1,974	5.4%	832	2.3%	285	0.8%	36,470	592	1.6%	37,062	21.5%	172,048
Rochdale	15,927	41.5%	10,049	26.2%	3,781	9.8%	4,796	12.5%	2,680	7.0%	882	2.3%	284	0.7%	38,399	463	1.2%	38,862	23.0%	169,298
Salford	21,445	46.8%	9,600	21.0%	5,641	12.3%	4,225	9.2%	3,545	7.7%	1,095	2.4%	247	0.5%	45,798	356	0.8%	46,154	23.0%	200,941
Stockport	35,571	50.2%	12,551	17.7%	7,430	10.5%	4,977	7.0%	5,589	7.9%	4,542	6.4%	243	0.3%	70,903	582	0.8%	71,485	31.3%	228,239
Tameside	18,289	41.8%	12,075	27.6%	3,924	9.0%	5,912	13.5%	2,690	6.1%	646	1.5%	244	0.6%	43,780	471	1.1%	44,251	25.4%	174,356
Trafford	30,966	50.0%	8,620	13.9%	8,037	13.0%	3,136	5.1%	9,315	15.0%	1,659	2.7%	181	0.3%	61,916	425	0.7%	62,341	35.1%	177,507
Wigan	26,200	47.0%	16,830	30.2%	2,737	4.9%	5,661	10.1%	3,233	5.8%	739	1.3%	377	0.7%	55,777	483	0.9%	56,260	22.3%	252,615
Totals	251,449	47.1%	111,928	21.0%	64,968	12.2%	46,289	8.7%	41,021	7.7%	14,702	2.8%	2,969	0.6%	533,326	5,333	1.0%	538,659	25.1%	2,142,779
Source: Greater Manchester Elects

=== Second round results by borough ===
Local authority	First preference votes				Second preference votes					Total votes			
Local authority	Labour Co-op		Reform		Labour Co-op		Reform		Exhausted ballots	Labour Co-op		Reform	
Local authority	#	%	#	%	#	%	#	%	Exhausted ballots	#	%	#	%
Bolton	19,718	40.5%	12,524	25.7%	4,170	45.5%	4,998	54.5%	6,773	23,888	57.7%	17,522	42.3%
Bury	18,837	46.9%	9,111	22.7%	3,538	47.1%	3,974	52.9%	4,319	22,375	63.1%	13,085	36.9%
Manchester	49,326	54.0%	9,845	10.8%	16,784	80.1%	4,161	19.9%	10,251	66,110	82.5%	14,006	17.5%
Oldham	15,170	41.6%	10,723	29.4%	2,585	39.5%	3,952	60.5%	3,238	17,755	54.7%	14,675	45.3%
Rochdale	15,927	41.5%	10,049	26.2%	3,024	41.5%	4,268	58.5%	4,668	18,951	57.0%	14,317	43.0%
Salford	21,445	46.8%	9,600	21.0%	5,394	57.2%	4,028	42.8%	4,326	26,839	66.3%	13,628	33.7%
Stockport	35,571	50.2%	12,551	17.7%	8,131	61.4%	5,116	38.6%	1,557	43,702	71.2%	17,667	28.8%
Tameside	18,289	41.8%	12,075	27.6%	3,579	42.6%	4,823	57.4%	4,543	21,868	56.4%	16,898	43.6%
Trafford	30,966	50.0%	8,620	13.9%	7,852	61.1%	5,009	38.9%	7,806	38,818	74.0%	13,629	26.0%
Wigan	26,200	47.0%	16,830	30.2%	3,019	38.0%	4,921	62.0%	4,324	29,219	57.3%	21,751	42.7%
Totals	251,449	47.1%	111,928	21.0%	58,076	56.2%	45,250	43.8%	51,805	309,525	66.7%	157,178	33.3%
Source: Greater Manchester Elects

== Previous election result ==
2024 Greater Manchester mayoral election
Party	Candidate	Votes	%	±%
Labour Co-op	Andy Burnham	420,749	63.4	−3.9
Conservative	Laura Evans	68,946	10.4	−9.2
Independent	Nick Buckley	50,304	7.6	+7.6
Reform	Dan Barker	49,532	7.5	+4.8
Green	Hannah Spencer	45,905	6.9	+2.5
Liberal Democrats	Jake Austin	28,195	4.2	+1.0
Majority		351,803	53.0	
Rejected ballots		5,863		
Turnout		663,631	32.0	−2.74
Registered electors		2,088,644		
Labour Co-op hold		Swing	+2.7	

== See also ==
- 2026 Manchester City Council election
- 2026 Norfolk Police and Crime Commissioner by-election
- 2026 UK Labour Party leadership election
