= 2021 Greater Manchester mayoral election =

Mayoral election in Greater Manchester, England

- 6 May 2021
- Registered: 2,057,643
- Turnout: 34.7% (▲5.8 pp)
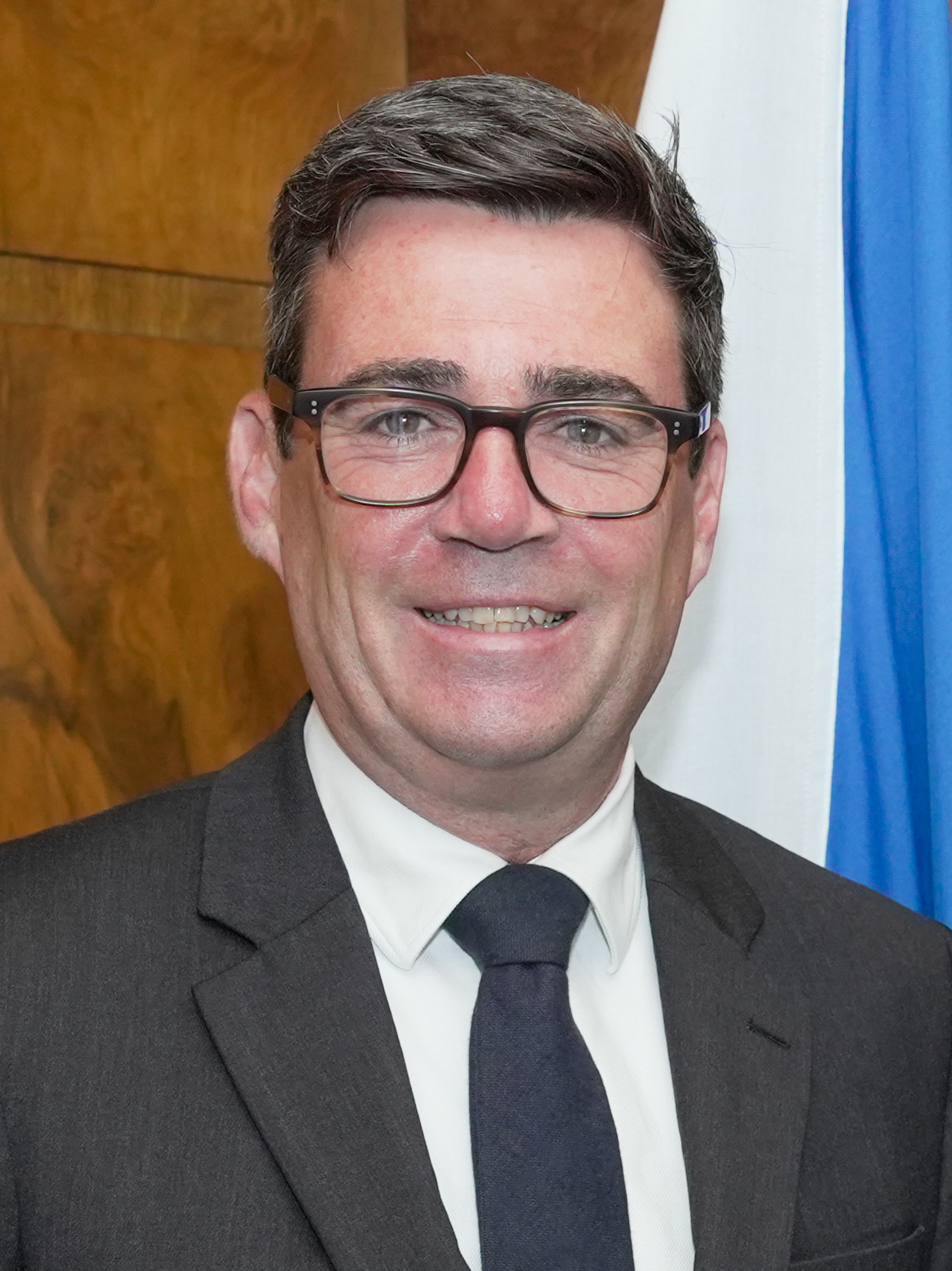
	First party	Second party
Candidate	Andy Burnham	Laura Evans
Party	Labour Co-op	Conservative
Popular vote	473,024	137,753
Percentage	67.3%	19.6%
Swing	▲3.9 pp	▼3.1 pp
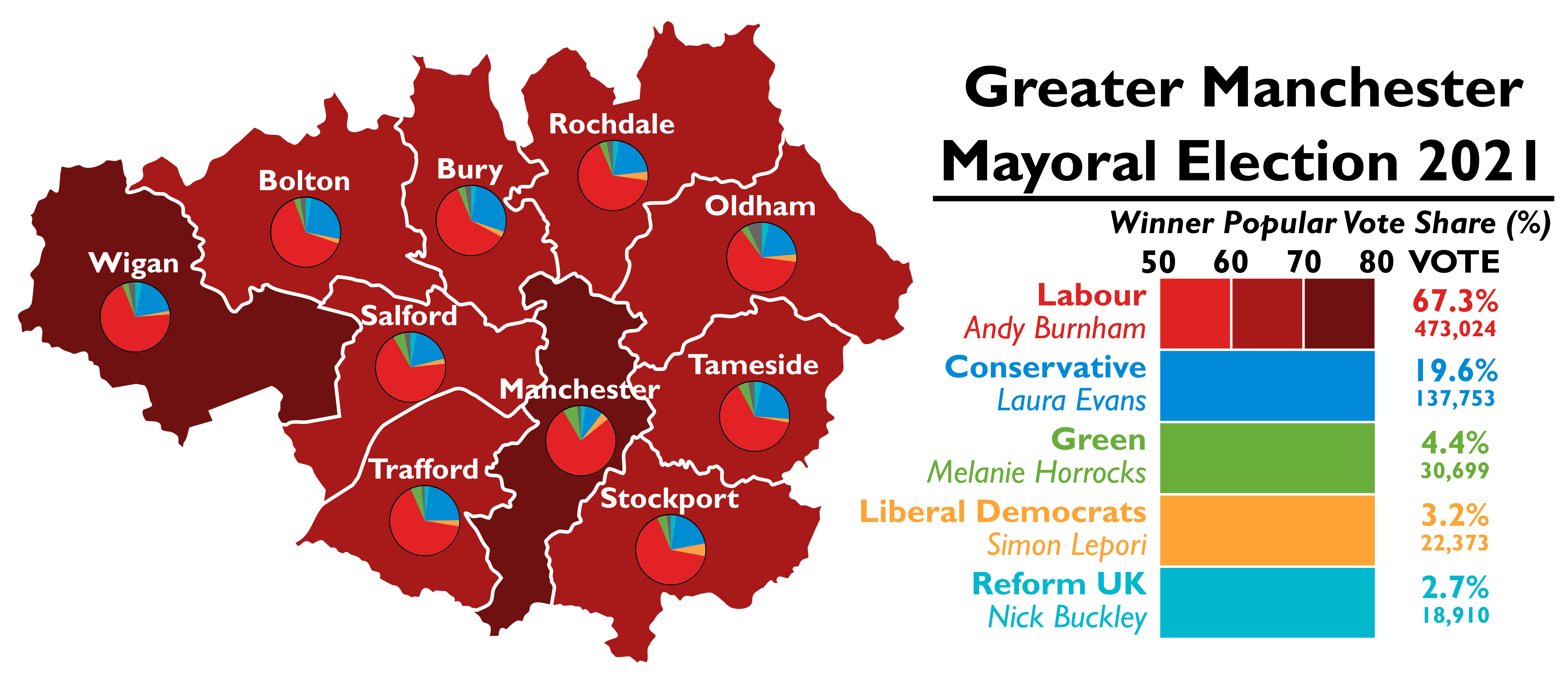
- Results of the 2021 Greater Manchester mayoral election by borough
Mayor before election
Andy Burnham
Labour Co-op
Elected Mayor
Andy Burnham
Labour Co-op

The 2021 Greater Manchester mayoral election was held on 6 May 2021 to elect the mayor of Greater Manchester. This election, alongside other local and mayoral elections across England and Wales, was originally scheduled to take place on 7 May 2020, but was delayed by the UK Government on 13 March 2020, due to the unfolding COVID-19 pandemic. The election took place on the same day as council elections within the city-region, including the election for the mayor of Salford, as well as elections across England and Wales. It was the second election to the position of mayor. It used the supplementary vote as its electoral system.

== Background ==
The mayor of Greater Manchester serves as the directly elected leader of the Greater Manchester Combined Authority. The mayor has power over investment directly to the combined authority from the government of £30 million a year for 30 years from 2017. The mayor also incorporates the Police and Crime Commissioner role of the Greater Manchester Police into the post. In addition to these, the mayor has authority over strategic housing planning, transport, adult education and skills, social care and others.

The first election for the role was held in 2017, Labour candidate Andy Burnham won with 63% of the vote in the first round.

As a result of the ongoing COVID-19 pandemic in the United Kingdom the government announced on the 13 March 2020 that it would postpone the mayoral election, along with all other scheduled local government elections across the UK, for one year. The Coronavirus Act 2020 received royal assent 12 days later on the 25 March 2020 giving legal effect to the government's announcement. This was the first such postponement of elections since the foot-and-mouth outbreak caused a one-month delay of the 2001 local elections.

=== Events prior to the election ===
In August, Burnham and the Mayor of Liverpool City Region Steve Rotherham pushed the government to pay workers asked to self-isolate by the contact tracing system during the COVID-19 pandemic, Burnham had also used the Mayors and Combined Authority resources to run a local contact tracing system where the national system had deficits. As the pandemic entered a period of increase in the Autumn the British government created a three tiered system for what local social and economic restrictions would be implemented. Greater Manchester was initially placed at tier 2 restrictions, however the government went into talks with the Mayor and the council leaders to put Greater Manchester into tier 3 restrictions. Burnham cited inadequate financial support for businesses and workers in the city-region as he wanted 80% furlough support of employee wages, the same as the first wave response. He had also stated he preferred a short, nation-wide lockdown known as a "circuit breaker". Following these negotiations, Burnham was angered by the government's implementation of stronger financial support in London for their tier 2 restrictions. Burnham's role in the negotiations led to him being described by various media sources as "King of the North", due to him using his position to not just fight for Greater Manchester but the wider North of England. Polling company YouGov asked people in Britain why they believed Burnham was negotiating- similar levels believed it was "party politics" and "the interests of Manchester", though the latter was more popular nationally and more significant in the North.

The Greater Manchester Spatial Framework (GMSF) is a cooperative agreement between the mayor and the leaders of the ten councils on the use of land in Greater Manchester, such as housing development and use of the Green belt. The final draft was prepared for late 2020; however, there were fears that the borough of Stockport may reject the GMSF, prompting the mayor and other council leaders to warn politicians in opposition parties that rejecting the plan could lead to a greater loss of Green belt. The draft was published in October 2020 and signed by council leaders at the end of the month, anticipating a public consultation starting in December. However, Stockport Metropolitan Borough Council councillors voted against signing the GMSF, leading to the other nine boroughs and the Greater Manchester Mayor to create the "Places for Everyone" plan, essentially the spatial framework plan for their boroughs.

In late-2020 it was revealed that Greater Manchester Police (GMP) had failed to record 80,000 crimes in a year and was placed "advanced phase" of monitoring by Her Majesty's Inspectorate of Constabulary and Fire & Rescue Services. Mayor Burnham, who also has the role of police and crime commissioner, faced political pressure on this subject. Burnham responded by initiating a new "named officer" scheme to improve police accountability in the city . In later-January Burnham had stated that GMP had deliberately withheld information from his office, though he had not specified what information at the time.

== Electoral system ==
The election used a supplementary vote system, in which voters expressed a first and a second preference for candidates.

- If a candidate receives more than 50% of the first preference vote, that candidate wins.
- If no candidate receives more than 50% of first preference votes, the top two candidates proceed to a second round and all other candidates are eliminated.
- The first preference votes for the remaining two candidates stand in the final count.
- Voters' ballots whose first and second preference candidates are eliminated are discarded.
- Voters whose first preference candidates have been eliminated and whose second preference candidate is one of the top two have their second preference votes added to that candidate's count.

This means that the winning candidate has the support of a majority of voters who expressed a preference among the top two.

All registered electors (British, Irish, Commonwealth and European Union citizens) living in Greater Manchester aged 18 or over on 6 May 2021 were entitled to vote in the mayoral election. Those who were temporarily away from Greater Manchester (for example, away working, on holiday, in student accommodation or in hospital) were also entitled to vote. The deadline to register to vote in the election was announced nearer the election.

== Candidates ==
=== Conservative Party ===
Laura Evans, a former Trafford councillor and parliamentary candidate, was selected as the Conservative candidate in February 2020.

=== Green Party ===
Melanie Horrocks was selected as the Green Party candidate in 2019; she was the party's Manchester Central candidate in the 2019 General Election.

=== Labour Party ===
Andy Burnham, the incumbent mayor, announced his intention to seek re-election as mayor of Greater Manchester for the Labour Party in January 2020.

=== Liberal Democrats ===
Simon Lepori is a former healthcare worker who had previously stood in council elections in Trafford in 2016, 2018 and 2019, and was the party's candidate in the 2019 general election for the Wythenshawe & Sale East constituency. He was announced as the Liberal Democrats candidate on 19 January 2021.

Mr Lepori was subsequently elected as a Trafford councillor for the new Timperley Central ward at the 2023 local elections, then re-elected for a full-four year term in 2024.

=== Reform UK ===
Nick Buckley was announced as the Reform UK candidate on 12 March 2021.

=== Other candidates ===
- Stephen Morris stood as candidate for the English Democrats. Previously stood in the 2017 mayoral election for the party, as well as local council, European Parliament and UK Parliament elections.
- Marcus Farmer. Previously stood in the 2017 mayoral election, as well as the 2010 and 2015 general elections in the Manchester Withington constituency.
- Alec Marvel.
- David Sutcliffe.

=== Individuals not standing ===
Andy Kelly, councillor and leader of the Liberal Democrats group in Rochdale, was confirmed as the Liberal Democrats' candidate in August 2019 following a vote by members in Greater Manchester. However, on 11 August 2020 Kelly stood down, stating that the delay in the election for a year has impacted his employment.

Michael Elston intended to run as an independent candidate, but ultimately could not do so because he filed defective paperwork. He intended to run on a platform centred on reforming civil penalties and justice in the courts. He had previously stood for election in Manchester City Council's Chorlton ward in 2018 and 2019.

== Campaign ==
The incumbent mayor Andy Burnham pledged to take the bus services of Greater Manchester into public control, establish an integrated ticket system for all buses and Metrolink trams, make the city-region carbon neutral by 2038 and build 30,000 social homes over the next decade. The BBC noted that should the metro mayor take the buses back into public control it would be the first place outside of London to do so. In a February interview, Burnham discussed having a "Good Landlord Charter", in which landlords who sign up will have properties of good health and safety standard and they do not utilise 'no fault evictions'.

Laura Evans was critical of Burnham's plans to build on sparser parts of the city-region and the implementation of a Clean Air Zone.

Simon Lepori, the Liberal Democrat candidate, saw his primary policies as integrating public transport across the city, the integration of health and social care and reducing the cost of housing.

== Results and follow up statistics ==
=== Overall result ===
The incumbent mayor Andy Burnham retained his position within the first round, increasing his majority from the 2017 election by 10.2 percentage points with a swing from the Conservatives to Labour of 3.5 percentage points.

Greater Manchester Mayoral Election 2021
Party	Candidate	1st round		2nd round			1st round votesTransfer votes, 2nd round
Party	Candidate	Total	Of round	Transfers	Total	Of round	1st round votesTransfer votes, 2nd round
Labour Co-op	Andy Burnham	473,024	67.31%				
Conservative	Laura Evans	137,753	19.60%				
Green	Melanie Horrocks	30,699	4.37%				
Liberal Democrats	Simon Lepori	22,373	3.18%				
Reform	Nick Buckley	18,910	2.69%				
English Democrat	Stephen Morris	9,488	1.35%				
Independent	Marcus Farmer	6,448	0.92%				
Independent	David Sutcliffe	2,182	0.31%				
Independent	Alec Marvel	1,907	0.27%				
Majority					335,271	50.4%	
Turnout		714,745	34.74%	Rejected ballots: 11,743			
Registered electors		2,057,643					

==== Rejected Ballots ====
There were 11,743 rejected ballots within the first round:

Breakdown of Rejected Ballots
Reason	Count
Want of an official mark	0
Voting for more than one candidate as to the first preference vote	5,177
Writing or mark by which voter could be identified	100
Unmarked or void for uncertainty as to the first preference vote	6,466

=== 1st Preference Results by Borough ===
Local authority	Labour		Conservative		Green		Liberal Democrats		Reform		English Democrats		Independents	
Local authority	#	%	#	%	#	%	#	%	#	%	#	%	#	%
Bolton	47,052	64.24	18,646	25.46	2,070	2.83	1,503	2.05	1,974	2.70	1,263	1.72	733	1.01
Bury	35,351	60.76	16,208	27.86	1,974	3.39	1,519	2.61	1,390	2.39	1,152	1.98	590	1.01
Manchester	86,736	77.31	9,211	8.21	7,617	6.79	4,282	3.82	2,464	2.20	864	0.77	1,022	0.9
Oldham	38,087	62.71	12,275	20.21	2,069	3.41	2,119	3.49	2,077	3.42	1,064	1.75	3,043	5.02
Rochdale	36,314	66.22	11,187	20.40	1,891	3.45	2,220	4.05	1,553	2.83	920	1.68	757	1.37
Salford	35,908	68.38	9,559	18.20	2,786	5.31	1,244	2.37	1,485	2.83	806	1.53	728	1.39
Stockport	57,971	65.74	17,146	19.44	3,823	4.34	5,206	5.90	2,289	2.60	893	1.01	862	0.97
Tameside	34,865	64.21	12,410	22.85	2,601	4.79	908	1.67	1,835	3.38	843	1.55	837	1.54
Trafford	50,417	65.72	17,446	22.74	3,863	5.04	2,212	2.88	1,534	2.00	509	0.66	733	0.95
Wigan	50,323	70.02	13,665	19.01	2,005	2.79	1,160	1.61	2,309	3.21	1,174	1.63	1,237	1.73
Totals	473,024	67.31	137,753	19.60	30,699	4.37	22,373	3.18	18,910	2.69	9,448	1.35	10,577	1.50
Source: Greater Manchester Elects

=== Bolton ===
Greater Manchester Mayoral Election 2021 (Bolton)
Party	Candidate	1st round		2nd round			1st round votesTransfer votes, 2nd round
Party	Candidate	Total	Of round	Transfers	Total	Of round	1st round votesTransfer votes, 2nd round
Labour Co-op	Andy Burnham	47,052	64.24%				
Conservative	Laura Evans	18,646	25.46%				
Green	Melanie Horrocks	2,070	2.83%				
Reform	Nick Buckley	1,974	2.70%				
Liberal Democrats	Simon Lepori	1,503	2.05%				
English Democrat	Stephen Morris	1,263	1.72%				
Independent	Marcus Farmer	532	0.73%				
Independent	David Sutcliffe	144	0.20%				
Independent	Alec Marvel	57	0.08%				
Majority					28,406	38.78%	
Turnout		74,556	36.30%				
Registered electors		205,388					

=== Bury ===
Greater Manchester Mayoral Election 2021 (Bury)
Party	Candidate	1st round		2nd round			1st round votesTransfer votes, 2nd round
Party	Candidate	Total	Of round	Transfers	Total	Of round	1st round votesTransfer votes, 2nd round
Labour Co-op	Andy Burnham	35,351	60.76%				
Conservative	Laura Evans	16,208	27.86%				
Green	Melanie Horrocks	1,974	3.39%				
Liberal Democrats	Simon Lepori	1,519	2.61%				
Reform	Nick Buckley	1,390	2.39%				
English Democrat	Stephen Morris	1,152	1.98%				
Independent	Marcus Farmer	362	0.62%				
Independent	David Sutcliffe	177	0.30%				
Independent	Alec Marvel	51	0.09%				
Majority					19,143	32.81%	
Turnout		58,184	40.07%				
Registered electors		145,190					

=== Manchester ===
Greater Manchester Mayoral Election 2021 (Manchester)
Party	Candidate	1st round		2nd round			1st round votesTransfer votes, 2nd round
Party	Candidate	Total	Of round	Transfers	Total	Of round	1st round votesTransfer votes, 2nd round
Labour Co-op	Andy Burnham	86,736	77.31%				
Conservative	Laura Evans	9,211	8.21%				
Green	Melanie Horrocks	7,617	6.79%				
Liberal Democrats	Simon Lepori	4,282	3.82%				
Reform	Nick Buckley	2,464	2.20%				
English Democrat	Stephen Morris	864	0.77%				
Independent	Marcus Farmer	789	0.70%				
Independent	David Sutcliffe	151	0.13%				
Independent	Alec Marvel	82	0.07%				
Majority					79,525	69.10%	
Turnout		112,196	29.40%				
Registered electors		381,563					

=== Oldham ===
Greater Manchester Mayoral Election 2021 (Oldham)
Party	Candidate	1st round		2nd round			1st round votesTransfer votes, 2nd round
Party	Candidate	Total	Of round	Transfers	Total	Of round	1st round votesTransfer votes, 2nd round
Labour Co-op	Andy Burnham	38,087	62.71%				
Conservative	Laura Evans	12,275	20.21%				
Liberal Democrats	Simon Lepori	2,119	3.49%				
Reform	Nick Buckley	2,077	3.42%				
Green	Melanie Horrocks	2,069	3.41%				
Independent	Marcus Farmer	1,408	2.32%				
Independent	Alec Marvel	1,158	1.91%				
English Democrat	Stephen Morris	1,064	1.75%				
Independent	David Sutcliffe	477	0.79%				
Majority					25,812	42.50%	
Turnout		60,734	36.68%				
Registered electors		165,556					

=== Rochdale ===
Greater Manchester Mayoral Election 2021 (Rochdale)
Party	Candidate	1st round		2nd round			1st round votesTransfer votes, 2nd round
Party	Candidate	Total	Of round	Transfers	Total	Of round	1st round votesTransfer votes, 2nd round
Labour Co-op	Andy Burnham	36,314	66.22%				
Conservative	Laura Evans	11,187	20.40%				
Liberal Democrats	Simon Lepori	2,220	4.05%				
Green	Melanie Horrocks	1,891	3.45%				
Reform	Nick Buckley	1,553	2.83%				
English Democrat	Stephen Morris	920	1.68%				
Independent	Marcus Farmer	490	0.89%				
Independent	Alec Marvel	178	0.32%				
Independent	David Sutcliffe	89	0.16%				
Majority					25,127	45.82%	
Turnout		54,842	33.28%				
Registered electors		164,783					

=== Salford ===
Greater Manchester Mayoral Election 2021 (Salford)
Party	Candidate	1st round		2nd round			1st round votesTransfer votes, 2nd round
Party	Candidate	Total	Of round	Transfers	Total	Of round	1st round votesTransfer votes, 2nd round
Labour Co-op	Andy Burnham	35,908	68.38%				
Conservative	Laura Evans	9,559	18.20%				
Green	Melanie Horrocks	2,786	5.31%				
Reform	Nick Buckley	1,485	2.83%				
Liberal Democrats	Simon Lepori	1,244	2.37%				
English Democrat	Stephen Morris	806	1.53%				
Independent	Marcus Farmer	523	1.00%				
Independent	David Sutcliffe	164	0.31%				
Independent	Alec Marvel	41	0.08%				
Majority					26,349	50.18%	
Turnout		52,516	28.23%				
Registered electors		186,058					

=== Stockport ===
Greater Manchester Mayoral Election 2021 (Stockport)
Party	Candidate	1st round		2nd round			1st round votesTransfer votes, 2nd round
Party	Candidate	Total	Of round	Transfers	Total	Of round	1st round votesTransfer votes, 2nd round
Labour Co-op	Andy Burnham	57,971	65.74%				
Conservative	Laura Evans	17,146	19.44%				
Liberal Democrats	Simon Lepori	5,206	5.90%				
Green	Melanie Horrocks	3,823	4.34%				
Reform	Nick Buckley	2,289	2.60%				
English Democrat	Stephen Morris	893	1.01%				
Independent	Marcus Farmer	542	0.61%				
Independent	David Sutcliffe	263	0.30%				
Independent	Alec Marvel	52	0.06%				
Majority					40,825	46.30	
Turnout		88,185	39.48%				
Registered electors		223,387					

=== Tameside ===
Greater Manchester Mayoral Election 2021 (Tameside)
Party	Candidate	1st round		2nd round			1st round votesTransfer votes, 2nd round
Party	Candidate	Total	Of round	Transfers	Total	Of round	1st round votesTransfer votes, 2nd round
Labour Co-op	Andy Burnham	34,865	64.21%				
Conservative	Laura Evans	12,410	22.85%				
Green	Melanie Horrocks	2,601	4.79%				
Reform	Nick Buckley	1,835	3.38%				
Liberal Democrats	Simon Lepori	908	1.67%				
English Democrat	Stephen Morris	843	1.55%				
Independent	Marcus Farmer	430	0.79%				
Independent	Alec Marvel	222	0.41%				
Independent	David Sutcliffe	185	0.34%				
Majority					22,455	41.36%	
Turnout		54,299	31.89%				
Registered electors		170,293					

=== Trafford ===
Greater Manchester Mayoral Election 2021 (Trafford)
Party	Candidate	1st round		2nd round			1st round votesTransfer votes, 2nd round
Party	Candidate	Total	Of round	Transfers	Total	Of round	1st round votesTransfer votes, 2nd round
Labour Co-op	Andy Burnham	50,417	65.72%				
Conservative	Laura Evans	17,446	22.74%				
Green	Melanie Horrocks	3,863	5.04%				
Liberal Democrats	Simon Lepori	2,212	2.88%				
Reform	Nick Buckley	1,534	2.00%				
English Democrat	Stephen Morris	509	0.66%				
Independent	Marcus Farmer	367	0.48%				
Independent	David Sutcliffe	348	0.45%				
Independent	Alec Marvel	18	0.02%				
Majority					32,971	42.98%	
Turnout		76,714	44.44%				
Registered electors		172,639					

=== Wigan ===
Greater Manchester Mayoral Election 2021 (Wigan)
Party	Candidate	1st round		2nd round			1st round votesTransfer votes, 2nd round
Party	Candidate	Total	Of round	Transfers	Total	Of round	1st round votesTransfer votes, 2nd round
Labour Co-op	Andy Burnham	50,323	70.02%				
Conservative	Laura Evans	13,665	19.01%				
Reform	Nick Buckley	2,309	3.21%				
Green	Melanie Horrocks	2,005	2.79%				
English Democrat	Stephen Morris	1,174	1.63%				
Liberal Democrats	Simon Lepori	1,160	1.61%				
Independent	Marcus Farmer	1,005	1.40%				
Independent	David Sutcliffe	184	0.26%				
Independent	Alec Marvel	48	0.07%				
Majority					36,658	51.01%	
Turnout		71,873	29.60				
Registered electors		242,786					

== See also ==
- 2021 Manchester City Council election
