= 2017 Greater Manchester mayoral election =

Local election in England

- 4 May 2017
- Turnout: 28.9%
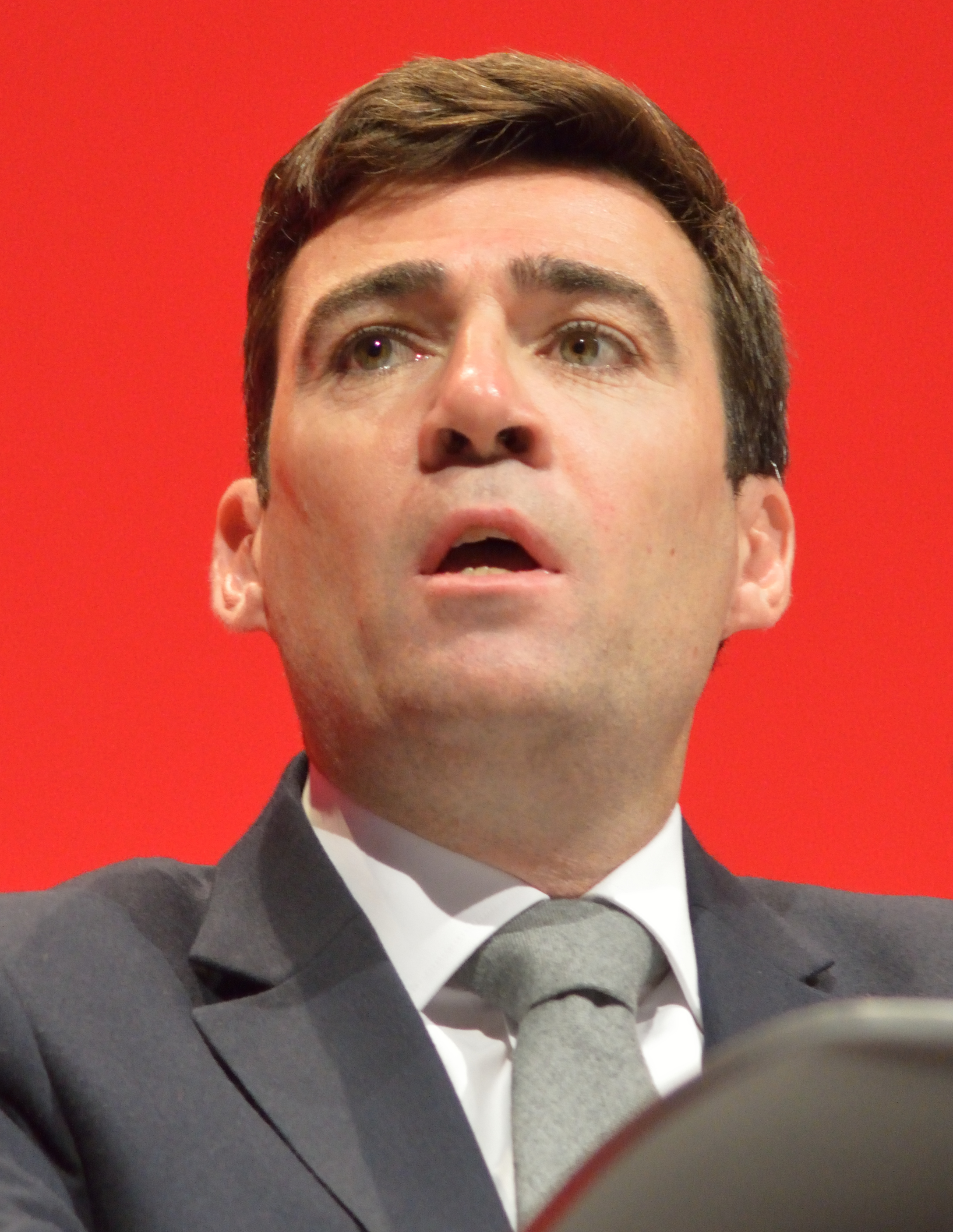

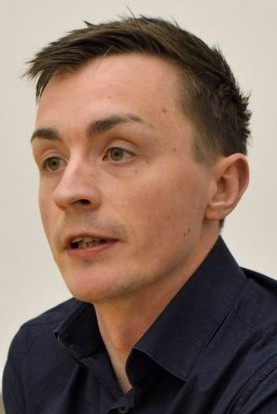

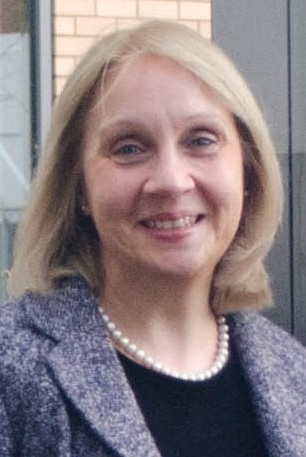
Candidate	Andy Burnham	Sean Anstee	Jane Brophy
Party	Labour Co-op	Conservative	Liberal Democrats
Popular vote	359,352	128,752	34,334
Percentage	63.4%	22.7%	6.1%
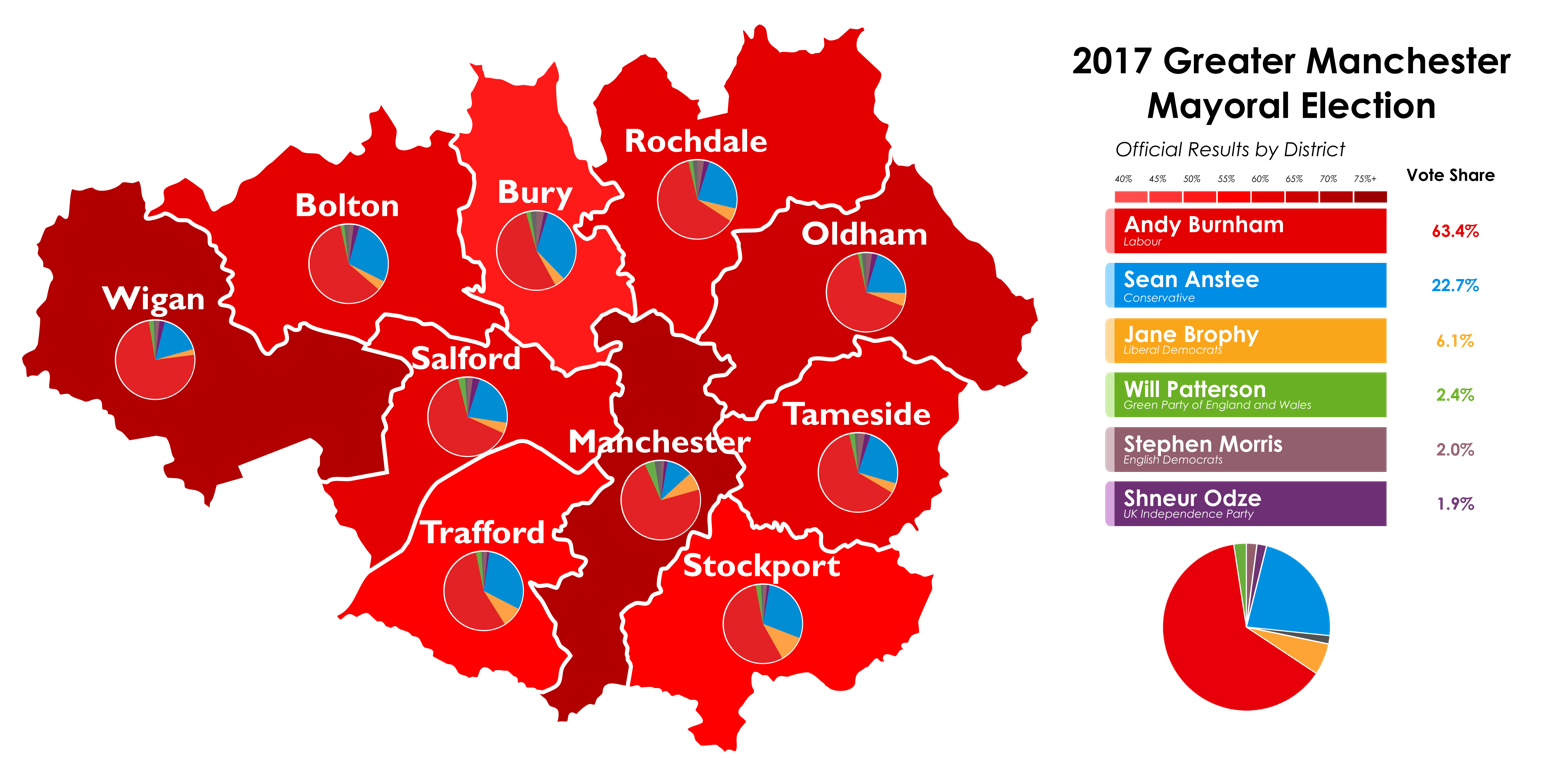
- Results of the 2017 Greater Manchester mayoral election by borough
Mayor before election
Tony Lloyd (interim)
Labour
Elected Mayor
Andy Burnham
Labour Co-op

The inaugural Greater Manchester mayoral election was held on 4 May 2017 to elect the Mayor of Greater Manchester. The next successive election was due to be held on 7 May 2020, but due to that year's outbreak of the novel Coronavirus, the election was postponed until May 2021. Subsequent elections are legislatively required to be held every four years thereafter. The electoral system used for the election is the supplementary vote (SV).

The mayor leads the Greater Manchester Combined Authority, sitting alongside the leaders of the ten metropolitan borough councils who form the mayor's cabinet. The creation of the position was part of a devolution deal giving local government additional powers and funding, enacted via the Cities and Local Government Devolution Act 2016. The interim mayor was Tony Lloyd, the Greater Manchester Police and Crime Commissioner. The office of police and crime commissioner was subsumed into the mayor's role.

Nominations for candidates wishing to stand in the election closed on 4 April 2017, after which the final list of candidates was published.

== Electoral system ==
The election used the supplementary vote system, in which voters express a first and a second preference of candidates.

- If a candidate receives over 50% of the first preference vote the candidate wins.
- If no candidate receives an overall majority, i.e., over 50% of first preference votes, the top two candidates proceed to a second round and all other candidates are eliminated.
- The first preference votes for the remaining two candidates stand in the final count.
- Voters' ballots whose first and second preference candidates are eliminated are discarded.
- Voters whose first preference candidates have been eliminated and whose second preference candidate is in the top two have their second preference votes added to the count.

All registered electors (British, Commonwealth and European Union citizens) living in Greater Manchester aged 18 or over on 4 May 2017 were entitled to vote in the mayoral election. The deadline to register to vote in the election was midnight on 13 April 2017.

== Candidates ==
=== Conservative Party ===
- Sean Anstee, Trafford Council Leader and Councillor for Bowdon.

=== English Democrats ===
- Stephen Morris, General Secretary of the Workers of England Union and North West Chairman of the English Democrats.

=== Green Party ===
- Deyika Nzeribe was selected as the Green Party candidate. However, he died of a heart attack on 1 January 2017. Will Patterson was selected as the Green Party's new mayoral candidate.

=== Independents ===
- Mohammad Aslam, property developer who has lived in the area for 17 years. Became notable for doing his manifesto video entirely in Urdu.
- Marcus Farmer – local businessman. Stood as Independent candidate in MP elections for Manchester Withington in 2010 and 2015.

=== Labour and Co-operative Party ===
- Andy Burnham, MP for Leigh since 2001, Shadow Home Secretary 2015–16, former Shadow Secretary of State for Health from 2011 to 2015, former Secretary of State for Health from 2009 to 2010, Secretary of State for Culture, Media and Sport 2008–2009 and Candidate for Leader of the Labour Party in 2010 and 2015. Burnham was also selected by the Co-operative Party and stood for election as a joint Labour and Co-operative Party candidate.
  - On 5 May 2016, a spokesperson for Burnham confirmed that he had been approached by party officials in Greater Manchester, asking him to consider resigning from the Shadow Cabinet of Jeremy Corbyn in order to run in the upcoming mayoral election in 2017. On 18 May 2016, he confirmed that he was standing for mayorship. Burnham was selected as the Labour candidate in August 2016. In September 2016, Burnham said that he would resign as Shadow Home Secretary once a replacement had been found, in order to concentrate on his mayoral bid. He was succeeded by Diane Abbott in October. Burnham said, if elected as Greater Manchester's mayor, he would resign his seat as the member of parliament for Leigh. However, the 2017 general election was declared a fortnight before the mayoral election; Burnham did not stand as a candidate.

=== Liberal Democrats ===
- Jane Brophy is a Trafford councillor representing Timperley. Stood as a Liberal Democrat in parliamentary elections for Altrincham and Sale West in 2010, 2015 and 2017, and a by-election in Oldham West and Royton in 2015.

=== UKIP ===
- Shneur Odze, former North West England European Parliament candidate.

=== Former candidates ===
==== Communist League ====
- Peter Clifford was selected as the Communist League candidate. In March he withdrew his candidacy citing the cost of the deposit.

== Results ==
Results of the election by wards

Greater Manchester Mayoral Election 2017
Party	Candidate	1st round		2nd round			1st round votesTransfer votes, 2nd round
Party	Candidate	Total	Of round	Transfers	Total	Of round	1st round votesTransfer votes, 2nd round
Labour Co-op	Andy Burnham	359,352	63.4%				
Conservative	Sean Anstee	128,752	22.7%				
Liberal Democrats	Jane Brophy	34,334	6.1%				
Green	Will Patterson	13,424	2.4%				
English Democrat	Stephen Morris	11,115	2.0%				
UKIP	Shneur Odze	10,583	1.9%				
Independent	Mohammad Aslam	5,815	1.0%				
Independent	Marcus Farmer	3,360	0.6%				
Majority					230,600	40.2%	
Turnout		573,543	28.9%				
Labour win							

=== 1st Preference Results by Local Authority ===
Local authority	Labour		Conservative		Liberal Democrats		Green		English Democrats		UKIP		Independents	
Local authority	#	%	#	%	#	%	#	%	#	%	#	%	#	%
Bolton	34,650	60.28	16,068	27.96	2,248	3.91	868	1.51	1,158	2.01	1,378	2.40	1,107	1.92
Bury	24,114	53.70	14,783	32.92	1,942	4.32	846	1.88	1,403	3.12	741	1.65	1,079	2.20
Manchester	73,044	72.70	10,435	10.39	7,485	7.45	3,991	3.97	1,330	1.32	1,503	1.50	2,258	2.25
Oldham	26,768	65.84	8,343	20.52	2,227	5.48	619	1.52	984	2.42	940	2.31	777	2.24
Rochdale	24,646	62.05	9,445	23.78	2,187	5.51	706	1.78	1,085	2.73	871	2.19	780	1.96
Salford	27,595	64.15	9,622	22.37	1,928	4.48	1,232	2.86	884	2.06	1,271	2.95	484	1.13
Stockport	38,668	55.17	19,720	28.10	7,678	10.95	1,496	2.13	1,135	1.62	796	1.14	598	0.86
Tameside	27,109	62.78	10,486	24.28	1,774	4.11	959	2.22	1,201	2.78	1,033	2.39	733	1.43
Trafford	35,492	55.77	19,262	30.27	5,359	8.42	1,412	2.22	845	1.33	629	0.99	637	1.00
Wigan	47,266	74.34	10,588	16.65	1,506	2.37	1,295	2.04	1,090	1.71	1,421	2.24	409	0.64
Totals	359,352	63.41	128,752	22.72	34,334	6.06	13,424	2.37	11,115	1.96	10,583	1.87	9,175	1.62
Source: Greater Manchester Elects

== Results by local authority ==
=== Bolton ===
Greater Manchester Mayoral Election 2017, Bolton
Party	Candidate	1st round		2nd round			1st round votesTransfer votes, 2nd round
Party	Candidate	Total	Of round	Transfers	Total	Of round	1st round votesTransfer votes, 2nd round
Labour Co-op	Andy Burnham	34,650	60.28%				
Conservative	Sean Anstee	16,068	27.96%				
Liberal Democrats	Jane Brophy	2,248	3.91%				
UKIP	Shneur Odze	1,378	2.40%				
English Democrat	Stephen Morris	1,158	2.01%				
Green	Will Patterson	868	1.51%				
Independent	Mohammad Aslam	865	1.50%				
Independent	Marcus Farmer	242	0.42%				
Majority					18,582	31.95%	
Turnout		58,165	29.34%				

=== Bury ===
Greater Manchester Mayoral Election 2017, Bury
Party	Candidate	1st round		2nd round			1st round votesTransfer votes, 2nd round
Party	Candidate	Total	Of round	Transfers	Total	Of round	1st round votesTransfer votes, 2nd round
Labour Co-op	Andy Burnham	24,114	53.70%				
Conservative	Sean Anstee	14,783	32.92%				
Liberal Democrats	Jane Brophy	1,942	4.32%				
English Democrat	Stephen Morris	1,403	3.12%				
Green	Will Patterson	846	1.88%				
Independent	Mohammad Aslam	830	1.85%				
UKIP	Shneur Odze	741	1.65%				
Independent	Marcus Farmer	249	0.55%				
Majority					9,331	20.55%	
Turnout		45,387	32.16%				

=== Manchester ===
Greater Manchester Mayoral Election 2017, Manchester
Party	Candidate	1st round		2nd round			1st round votesTransfer votes, 2nd round
Party	Candidate	Total	Of round	Transfers	Total	Of round	1st round votesTransfer votes, 2nd round
Labour Co-op	Andy Burnham	73,044	72.70%				
Conservative	Sean Anstee	10,435	10.39%				
Liberal Democrats	Jane Brophy	7,485	7.45%				
Green	Will Patterson	3,991	3.97%				
Independent	Mohammad Aslam	1,929	1.92%				
UKIP	Shneur Odze	1,503	1.50%				
English Democrat	Stephen Morris	1,330	1.32%				
Independent	Marcus Farmer	755	0.75%				
Majority					62,609	61.44%	
Turnout		101,909	28.40%				

=== Oldham ===
Greater Manchester Mayoral Election 2017, Oldham
Party	Candidate	1st round		2nd round			1st round votesTransfer votes, 2nd round
Party	Candidate	Total	Of round	Transfers	Total	Of round	1st round votesTransfer votes, 2nd round
Labour Co-op	Andy Burnham	26,768	65.84%				
Conservative	Sean Anstee	8,343	20.52%				
Liberal Democrats	Jane Brophy	2,227	5.48%				
English Democrat	Stephen Morris	984	2.42%				
UKIP	Shneur Odze	940	2.31%				
Green	Will Patterson	619	1.52%				
Independent	Mohammad Aslam	486	1.20%				
Independent	Marcus Farmer	291	0.72%				
Majority					18,425	44.61%	
Turnout		41,302	25.78%				

=== Rochdale ===
Greater Manchester Mayoral Election 2017, Rochdale
Party	Candidate	1st round		2nd round			1st round votesTransfer votes, 2nd round
Party	Candidate	Total	Of round	Transfers	Total	Of round	1st round votesTransfer votes, 2nd round
Labour Co-op	Andy Burnham	24,646	62.05%				
Conservative	Sean Anstee	9,445	23.78%				
Liberal Democrats	Jane Brophy	2,187	5.51%				
English Democrat	Stephen Morris	1,085	2.73%				
UKIP	Shneur Odze	871	2.19%				
Green	Will Patterson	706	1.78%				
Independent	Mohammad Aslam	490	1.23%				
Independent	Marcus Farmer	290	0.73%				
Majority					15,201	37.74%	
Turnout		40,281	25.24%				

=== Salford ===
Greater Manchester Mayoral Election 2017, Salford
Party	Candidate	1st round		2nd round			1st round votesTransfer votes, 2nd round
Party	Candidate	Total	Of round	Transfers	Total	Of round	1st round votesTransfer votes, 2nd round
Labour Co-op	Andy Burnham	27,595	64.15%				
Conservative	Sean Anstee	9,622	22.37%				
Liberal Democrats	Jane Brophy	1,928	4.48%				
UKIP	Shneur Odze	1,271	2.95%				
Green	Will Patterson	1,232	2.86%				
English Democrat	Stephen Morris	884	2.06%				
Independent	Marcus Farmer	261	0.61%				
Independent	Mohammad Aslam	223	0.52%				
Majority					17,973	41.37%	
Turnout		43,444	25.11%				

=== Stockport ===
Greater Manchester Mayoral Election 2017, Stockport
Party	Candidate	1st round		2nd round			1st round votesTransfer votes, 2nd round
Party	Candidate	Total	Of round	Transfers	Total	Of round	1st round votesTransfer votes, 2nd round
Labour Co-op	Andy Burnham	38,668	55.17%				
Conservative	Sean Anstee	19,720	28.1%				
Liberal Democrats	Jane Brophy	7,678	10.95%				
Green	Will Patterson	1,496	2.13%				
English Democrat	Stephen Morris	1,135	1.62%				
UKIP	Shneur Odze	796	1.14%				
Independent	Marcus Farmer	335	0.48%				
Independent	Mohammad Aslam	263	0.38%				
Majority					18,948	26.74%	
Turnout		70,866	32.19%				

=== Tameside ===
Greater Manchester Mayoral Election 2017, Tameside
Party	Candidate	1st round		2nd round			1st round votesTransfer votes, 2nd round
Party	Candidate	Total	Of round	Transfers	Total	Of round	1st round votesTransfer votes, 2nd round
Labour Co-op	Andy Burnham	27,109	62.78%				
Conservative	Sean Anstee	10,486	24.28%				
Liberal Democrats	Jane Brophy	1,774	4.11%				
English Democrat	Stephen Morris	1,201	2.78%				
UKIP	Shneur Odze	1,033	2.39%				
Green	Will Patterson	959	2.22%				
Independent	Marcus Farmer	342	0.79%				
Independent	Mohammad Aslam	278	0.64%				
Majority					16,623	38.00%	
Turnout		43,748	26.00%				

=== Trafford ===
Greater Manchester Mayoral Election 2017, Trafford
Party	Candidate	1st round		2nd round			1st round votesTransfer votes, 2nd round
Party	Candidate	Total	Of round	Transfers	Total	Of round	1st round votesTransfer votes, 2nd round
Labour Co-op	Andy Burnham	35,492	55.77%				
Conservative	Sean Anstee	19,262	30.27%				
Liberal Democrats	Jane Brophy	5,359	8.42%				
Green	Will Patterson	1,412	2.22%				
English Democrat	Stephen Morris	845	1.33%				
UKIP	Shneur Odze	629	0.99%				
Independent	Mohammad Aslam	354	0.56%				
Independent	Marcus Farmer	283	0.44%				
Majority					16,230	25.28%	
Turnout		64,202	38.35%				

=== Wigan ===
Greater Manchester Mayoral Election 2017, Wigan
Party	Candidate	1st round		2nd round			1st round votesTransfer votes, 2nd round
Party	Candidate	Total	Of round	Transfers	Total	Of round	1st round votesTransfer votes, 2nd round
Labour Co-op	Andy Burnham	47,266	74.34%				
Conservative	Sean Anstee	10,588	16.65%				
Liberal Democrats	Jane Brophy	1,506	2.37%				
UKIP	Shneur Odze	1,421	2.24%				
Green	Will Patterson	1,295	2.04%				
English Democrat	Stephen Morris	1,090	1.71%				
Independent	Marcus Farmer	312	0.49%				
Independent	Mohammad Aslam	97	0.15%				
Majority					36,678	57.10%	
Turnout		64,239	27.29%				
