= Interns Anonymous =

- Abbreviation: IA
- Formation: 2009
- Location: United Kingdom
- Website: http://internsanonymous.co.uk/

Interns Anonymous was a British based campaign and internet forum.

== History ==
Interns Anonymous was set up in March 2009 by two graduates who were both working as unpaid interns. Their initial aim was to create an internet forum where interns could share their experience anonymously. The organisation evolved to campaign against unpaid internships. It has represented the interests of interns before the Low Pay Commission, the Independent Parliamentary Standards Authority, the European Youth Parliament and the Social Mobility and Child Poverty Commission. In September 2013 a farewell post by founders Alex Try and Rosy Rickett formally closed the Interns Anonymous blog. It commended others who have taken up the baton such as Intern Aware, Graduate Fog and individuals such as Mark Watson and Joe Thomas.

== Guardian Article and British Library Web Archiving Programme ==
In November 2011, The Guardian newspaper reported that Interns Anonymous uncovered internal guidance that revealed that the Department of Business, Innovation and Skills had been warned by their own lawyers that the majority of unpaid interns were 'workers' according to the National Minimum Wage Act and therefore due the National Minimum Wage. As a consequence of their increased profile, the British Library added Interns Anonymous's website to the British Library Web Archiving programme as part of their project to ‘represent aspects of UK documentary heritage’.

== See also ==
- Intern Aware
