= Andy Burnham =

Prime Minister of the United Kingdom since 2026

The Right Honourable Andy Burnham MP
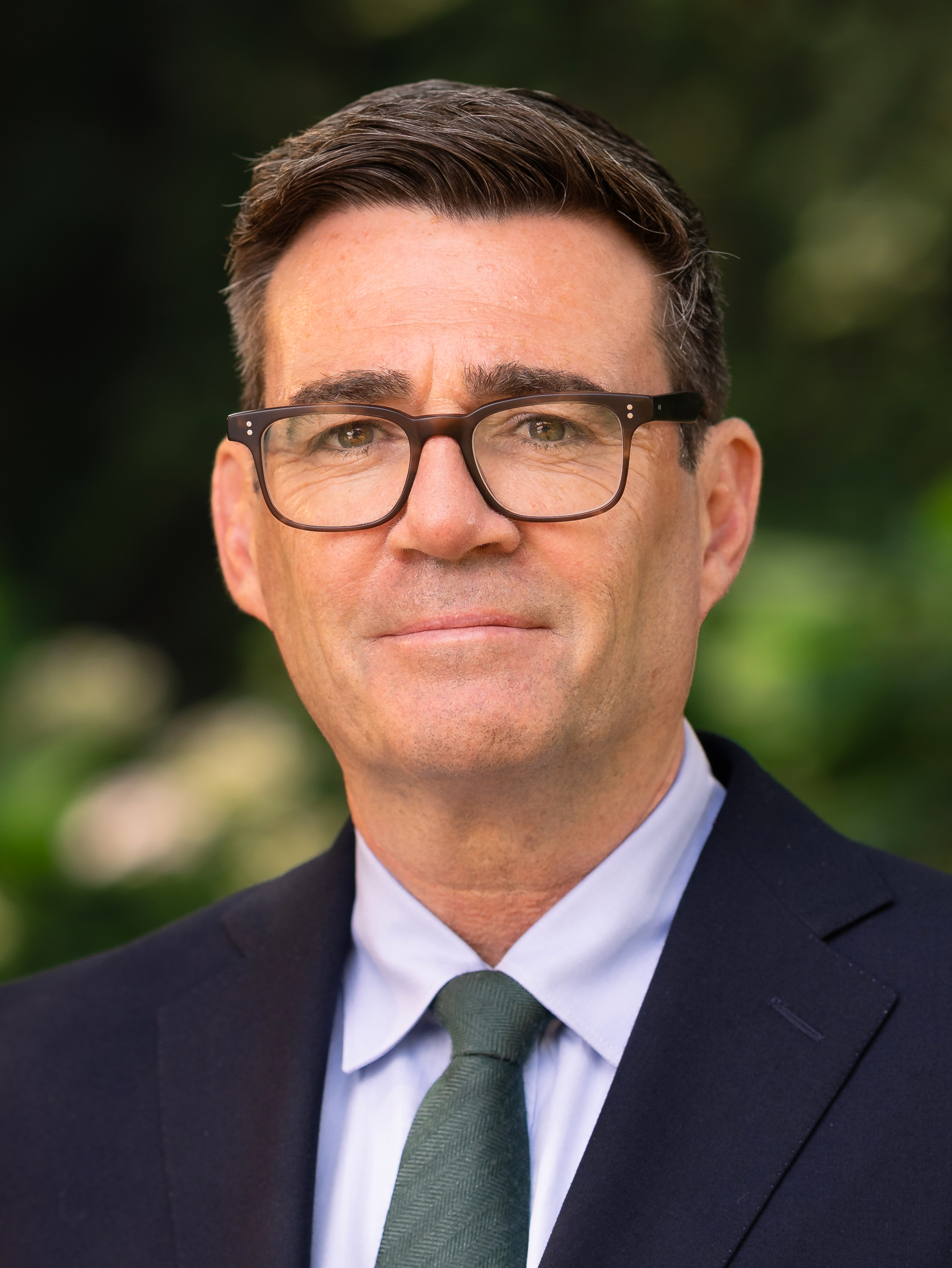
- Official portrait, 2026

Prime Minister of the United Kingdom
- Incumbent
- Assumed office 20 July 2026
- Monarch: Charles III
- First Secretary: Louise Haigh
- Preceded by: Keir Starmer

Leader of the Labour Party
- Incumbent
- Assumed office 17 July 2026
- Deputy: Lucy Powell
- Preceded by: Keir Starmer

Mayor of Greater Manchester
- In office 8 May 2017 – 19 June 2026
- Deputy: Richard Leese; Paul Dennett
- Preceded by: Tony Lloyd (interim)
- Succeeded by: Bev Craig (Note: Paul Dennett was acting mayor from 19 June 2026 to 3 August 2026)
Ministerial offices
Secretary of State for Health
In office 5 June 2009 – 11 May 2010
Prime Minister	Gordon Brown
Preceded by	Alan Johnson
Succeeded by	Andrew Lansley
Secretary of State for Culture, Media and Sport
In office 24 January 2008 – 5 June 2009
Prime Minister	Gordon Brown
Preceded by	James Purnell
Succeeded by	Ben Bradshaw
Chief Secretary to the Treasury
In office 28 June 2007 – 24 January 2008
Prime Minister	Gordon Brown
Chancellor	Alistair Darling
Preceded by	Stephen Timms
Succeeded by	Yvette Cooper
Junior ministerial offices
Minister of State for Health
In office 5 May 2006 – 28 June 2007
Prime Minister	Tony Blair
Preceded by	Jane Kennedy
Succeeded by	Ben Bradshaw
Parliamentary Under-Secretary of State for Home Affairs
In office 9 May 2005 – 5 May 2006
Prime Minister	Tony Blair
Preceded by	Caroline Flint
Succeeded by	Joan Ryan
Shadow cabinet posts
Shadow Home Secretary
In office 13 September 2015 – 6 October 2016
Leader	Jeremy Corbyn
Preceded by	Yvette Cooper
Succeeded by	Diane Abbott
Shadow Secretary of State for Health
In office 7 October 2011 – 13 September 2015
Leader	Ed Miliband; Harriet Harman (acting)
Preceded by	John Healey
Succeeded by	Heidi Alexander
In office 11 May 2010 – 8 October 2010
Leader	Harriet Harman (acting); Ed Miliband
Preceded by	Andrew Lansley
Succeeded by	John Healey
Shadow Secretary of State for Education
In office 8 October 2010 – 7 October 2011
Leader	Ed Miliband
Preceded by	Ed Balls
Succeeded by	Stephen Twigg

Member of Parliament
- Incumbent
- Assumed office 18 June 2026
- Preceded by: Josh Simons
- Constituency: Makerfield
- Majority: 9,231 (20.3%)
- In office 7 June 2001 – 3 May 2017
- Preceded by: Lawrence Cunliffe
- Succeeded by: Jo Platt
- Constituency: Leigh

Personal details
- Born: Andrew Murray Burnham; 7 January 1970 (age 56) Aintree, Lancashire, England
- Party: Labour Co-op
- Spouse: Marie-France van Heel (m. 2000)
- Children: 3
- Education: Fitzwilliam College, Cambridge (MA)
- Website: andyburnham.org.uk
- Andy Burnham's voice Burnham on bus deregulation in Greater Manchester; Recorded 13 February 2017

Andrew Murray Burnham (Note: /ˈbɜːrnəm/ BUR-nəm) (born 7 January 1970) is a British politician who has served as Prime Minister of the United Kingdom and Leader of the Labour Party since July 2026. He has been the member of Parliament (MP) for Makerfield in Greater Manchester since June 2026 and was Mayor of Greater Manchester from 2017 to 2026. He was previously the MP for Leigh from 2001 to 2017 and held several Cabinet positions. Burnham identifies as a socialist and is associated with the Labour Party's soft left; he is also a member of the Co-operative Party, which is allied with Labour. His political ideology has been called "Manchesterism".

Burnham was born and brought up in northern England, and joined the Labour Party at the age of 15. He worked as a journalist and political adviser before being elected the MP for Leigh in 2001. Under the prime ministers Tony Blair and Gordon Brown, Burnham was Chief Secretary to the Treasury and Culture Secretary, in which capacity he launched the Hillsborough Independent Panel. In 2009, as Health Secretary, he responded to the swine flu pandemic and launched an independent inquiry into the Stafford Hospital scandal.

Following Labour's defeat at the 2010 general election, Burnham served in the shadow cabinet from 2010 to 2016. He stood for the Labour leadership in 2010 and in 2015, coming fourth and second. In 2017 he stood down as an MP and was elected Mayor of Greater Manchester. He integrated Greater Manchester's tram and bus networks under the Bee Network and received the nickname "King of the North" for campaigning for more furlough funding for northern communities during the COVID-19 pandemic. Burnham's tenure as mayor increased his national profile and he was re-elected in 2021 and in 2024.

Following Labour's return to government in 2024, Burnham maintained comparatively high approval ratings while those of the prime minister, Keir Starmer, declined, and came to be seen as a potential successor. He returned to Parliament in 2026 by winning the Makerfield by-election and resigned as mayor. Starmer announced his resignation, leading to a party leadership election which Burnham won unopposed. During his premiership, Burnham has announced policies to move some government administration out of London as Number 10 North, cut fares on buses in England, reduce business rates on pubs, increase government support for apprenticeships and continue support for Ukraine.

== Early life and education ==
Andrew Murray Burnham was born on 7 January 1970 in Aintree, Lancashire, (Note: Historically in Lancashire, Aintree has been in Merseyside since the county's creation in 1974.) a suburb of Liverpool, and was brought up in Culcheth. His father, Kenneth Roy Burnham (1940–2026), was a telephone engineer, and his mother, Eileen Mary Burnham (née Murray), was a GP receptionist. Burnham's father was a Protestant while his mother is a Catholic of Irish descent, born and raised in Scotland. His great-grandfather was from Drogheda and emigrated to Liverpool in the 19th century.

Burnham was raised Catholic and served as an altar boy at his local church. He later described himself as "Catholic by upbringing" but "not particularly religious". He said: "Catholic social teaching underpins my politics. We did have to read the catechism at school but it is powerful and strong and right." He was educated at St Lewis Catholic Primary School and St Aelred's Roman Catholic High School in Newton-le-Willows; there he earned the nickname "Seven Eights", because of his "inability to remember that seven eights are 56" when reciting his times tables. He joined the Labour Party when he was 15.

Burnham read English as an undergraduate at Fitzwilliam College of the University of Cambridge, receiving a Bachelor of Arts (BA) in 1991 with upper second-class honours. By Cambridge tradition, his BA was later converted to a Master of Arts (MA Cantab) degree.

== Early political career ==
After university, Burnham moved to London. From 1991 to 1994, he was a journalist for the private company Baltic Publishing, writing for its trade magazines, covering tanker and intermodal transportation. From 1994 until the 1997 general election, he was a researcher for Tessa Jowell. He joined the Transport and General Workers' Union in 1995. Following the 1997 election, he was a parliamentary officer for the NHS Confederation from August to December 1997, before taking up the post as an administrator with the Football Task Force for a year. In 1998, he became a special adviser to the Secretary of State for Culture, Media and Sport, Chris Smith, a position he held until he was elected to the House of Commons in the 2001 general election.

=== Member of Parliament (2001–2017) ===
Following the retirement of Lawrence Cunliffe, Burnham was selected as the parliamentary candidate for Leigh in Greater Manchester, then a Labour safe seat. At the 2001 election, he was elected with a majority of 16,362 and gave his maiden speech in the House of Commons on 4 July 2001. Following his election to Parliament, Burnham was a member of the Health Select Committee from 2001 until 2003, when he was appointed Parliamentary private secretary (PPS) to the Home Secretary David Blunkett. Following Blunkett's first resignation in 2004, he became PPS to the education secretary Ruth Kelly. As well as Labour, Burnham is a member of the Co-operative Party, which has been allied to Labour since 1927 and runs all candidates jointly with it.

=== Frontbench roles (2005–2010) ===
==== 2005–2007: Early ministerial career ====
Following the 2005 general election, Burnham was promoted to serve in Tony Blair's government as Parliamentary Under-Secretary of State for the Home Office, where he was responsible for implementing the Identity Cards Act 2006. In the government reshuffle on 5 May 2006, he left the Home Office to become Minister of State for Delivery and Reform at the Department of Health.

When Gordon Brown formed his first cabinet on 28 June 2007, Burnham was appointed Chief Secretary to the Treasury, a position he held until 2008. During his tenure at the Treasury, he helped draft the 2007 Comprehensive Spending Review.

==== 2008–2009: Culture Secretary and the Hillsborough campaign ====
In a January 2008 reshuffle, Burnham was promoted to Secretary of State for Culture, Media and Sport, replacing James Purnell. In June 2008, he issued an apology to Shami Chakrabarti, the director of the human rights pressure group Liberty, after she threatened to sue him for libel over comments that she considered defamatory in an article Burnham wrote for Progress magazine.

Later that year, Burnham announced government plans to tighten controls on internet content to rectify what he described as an imbalance with television regulations. This announcement was followed by an address to the music industry lobbying group, UK Music, where he called for "a partnership between Government and the music business as a whole: one with rewards for both of us; one with rewards for society as a whole." He added, "My job – Government's job – is to preserve the value in the system."

In April 2009, after being heckled by the crowd at the 20th anniversary memorial of the Hillsborough disaster, Burnham raised the issue at the next day's cabinet meeting in Downing Street. He requested permission from Gordon Brown to raise the disaster in Parliament, and Brown agreed. This intervention ultimately led to the establishment of the second Hillsborough inquiry. By 2014, when Burnham spoke at the 25th anniversary of the disaster, he was cheered and applauded by the crowd.

On 27 April 2016, the day after the Hillsborough inquest verdict that found the 96 Hillsborough deaths had occurred as a result of unlawful killing, Burnham made a speech to the House of Commons calling for those responsible to be held to account. Condemning South Yorkshire Police, which had instigated a cover-up in the aftermath of the tragedy, he described the force as being "rotten to the core" while suggesting that the cover-up had been "advanced in the committee rooms of this House and in the press rooms of 10 Downing Street". The eleven-minute statement drew applause from MPs, a response that is generally against convention at Westminster.

In July 2026, the campaign reached a legislative milestone when the House of Commons passed the Public Office (Accountability) Bill, widely known as the Hillsborough Law. Advanced by the outgoing Keir Starmer government, the bill would establish a statutory duty of candour for public officials and provide non-means-tested legal aid for families facing the state at inquests. Burnham hailed the Bill's passage as a fundamental "rewiring of the state" that would address institutional failures; the Commons vote came days before he took office as prime minister.

==== 2009–2010: Health Secretary and the Stafford Hospital inquiry ====
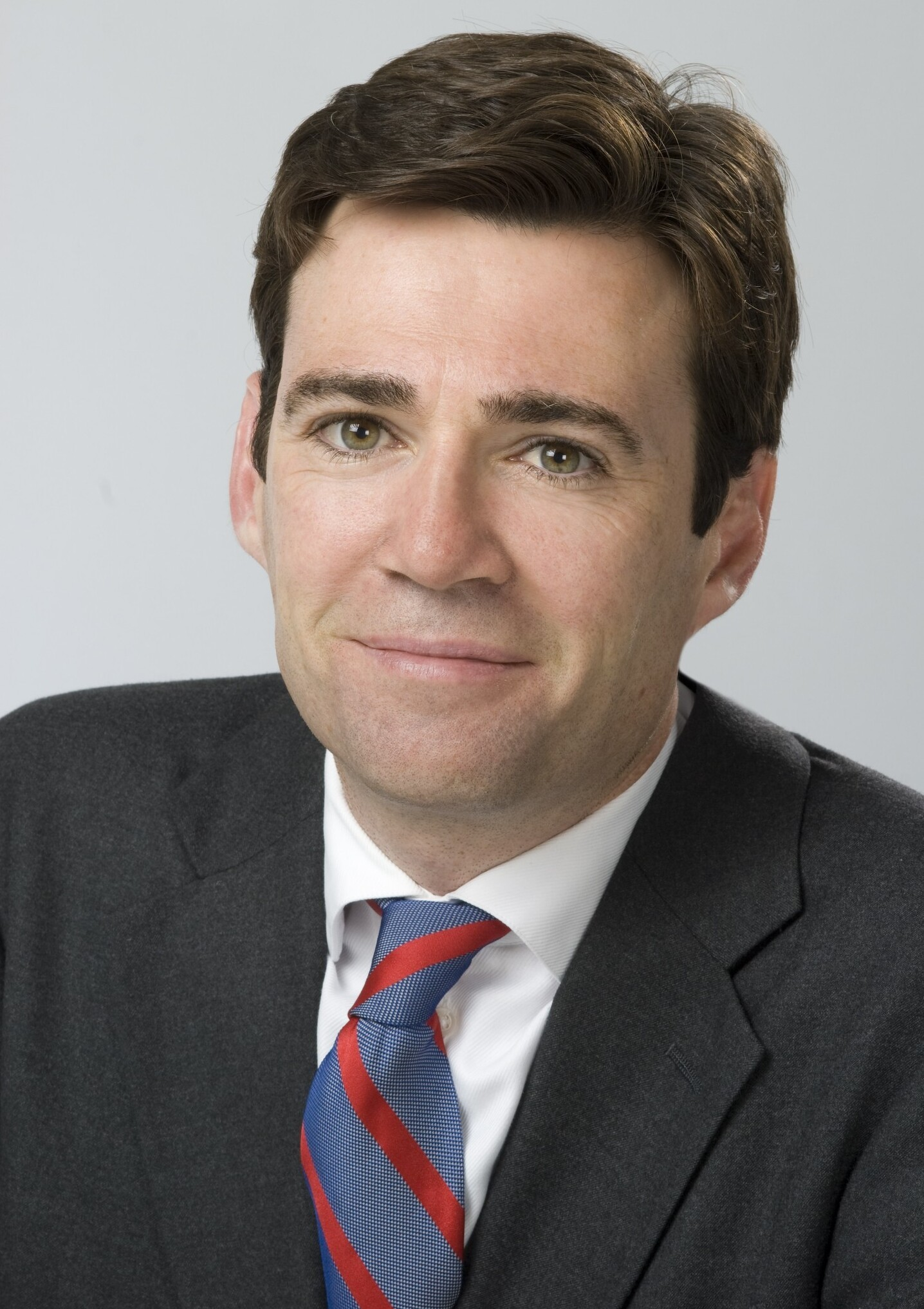
Official portrait as Health Secretary, 2009

In June 2009, Burnham was promoted to Secretary of State for Health, a post he held until the Labour government resigned following the 2010 general election. In July 2009, just a month after taking office, he launched an independent inquiry chaired by Robert Francis QC into unusually high mortality rates at Stafford Hospital (later renamed County Hospital). The inquiry uncovered systematic failures and heavily criticised the care provided by the Mid Staffordshire NHS Foundation Trust. A subsequent, wider public inquiry—also led by Francis—was launched in 2010 by Burnham's Conservative successor, Andrew Lansley. While this wider inquiry confirmed serious failings, it concluded that linking those failings to a specific number of deaths would be "misleading".

After leaving office, reports emerged claiming that Burnham and his predecessor as Health Secretary, Alan Johnson, had rejected 81 separate requests for a public inquiry into the Stafford Hospital deaths. Burnham also faced criticism for not visiting the hospital or meeting with the affected families during his tenure. The Daily Telegraph reported that up to 2,800 more deaths than expected had occurred across 14 NHS trusts highlighted for high mortality rates since initial concerns were raised in 2005. However, these figures were later discredited. The Keogh Review, led by Bruce Keogh into the 14 trusts, subsequently described the use of such statistical mortality measures as "clinically meaningless and academically reckless."

==== National Care Service proposal ====
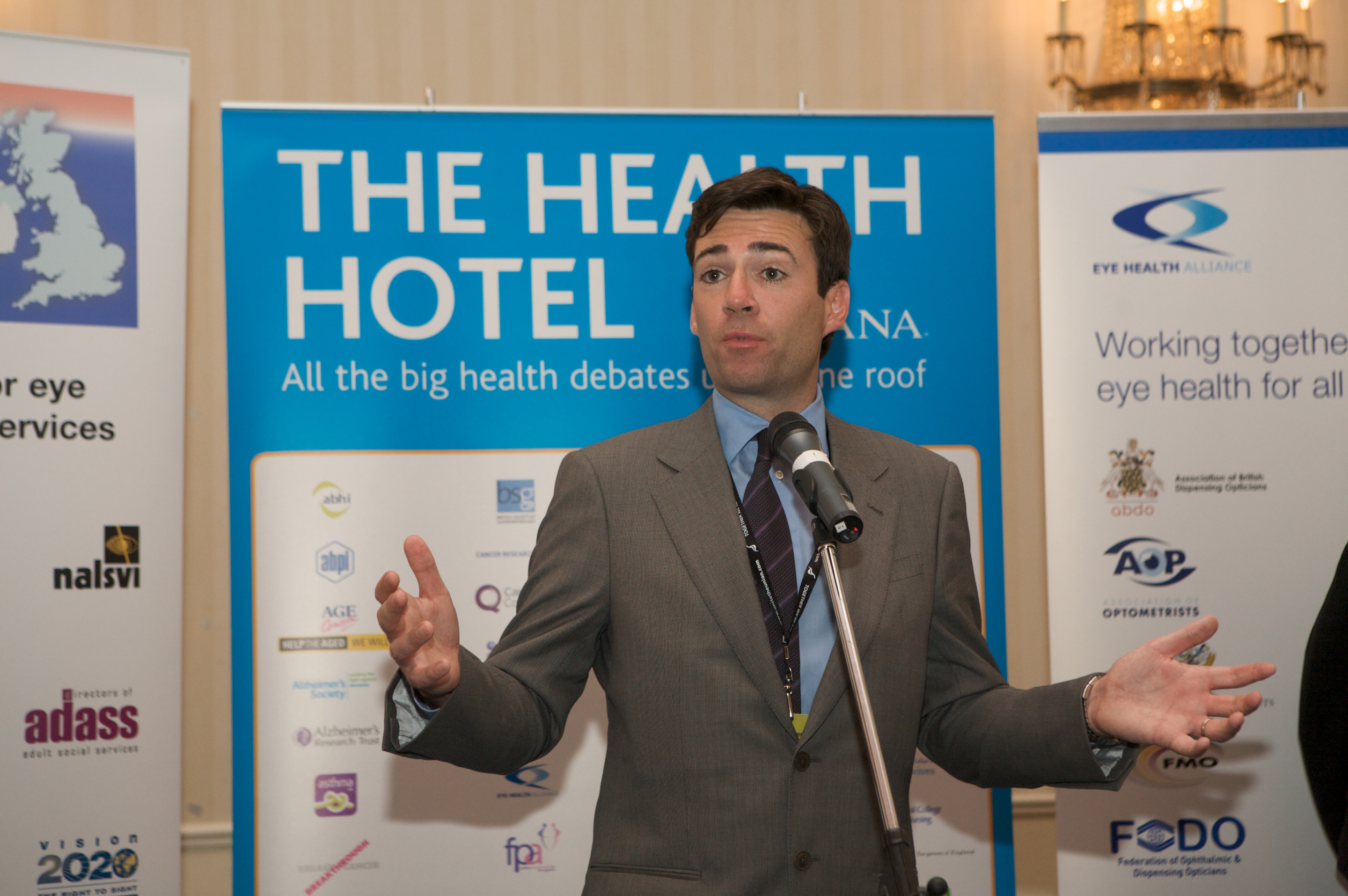
Burnham as Health Secretary, speaking at an event during the Labour Party Conference in 2009

As Health Secretary, Burnham proposed a National Care Service (NCS), aiming to introduce a publicly funded social care system free at the point of use, modelled on the National Health Service. In July 2009, the Department of Health published its green paper, Shaping the Future of Care Together, which proposed an NCS "on par with the NHS." This was followed in September by a public consultation dubbed the "Big Care Debate", which Gordon Brown promoted as a "crucial national debate".

Following the consultation, the government proposed introducing the National Care Service in phases. The first stage began with the Personal Care at Home Act 2010, passed in April 2010. Burnham had announced the proposed NCS a month earlier, with plans to expand access to free social care in stages. The second stage, scheduled for 2014, was designed to extend free social care to individuals in residential care for more than two years, with a third and final stage fully introducing free social care for all adults after 2015. However, following Labour's defeat in the 2010 general election, the Conservative-Liberal Democrat coalition led by David Cameron and Nick Clegg scrapped the initiative, and the Personal Care at Home Act 2010 was subsequently repealed.

=== Shadow portfolios ===
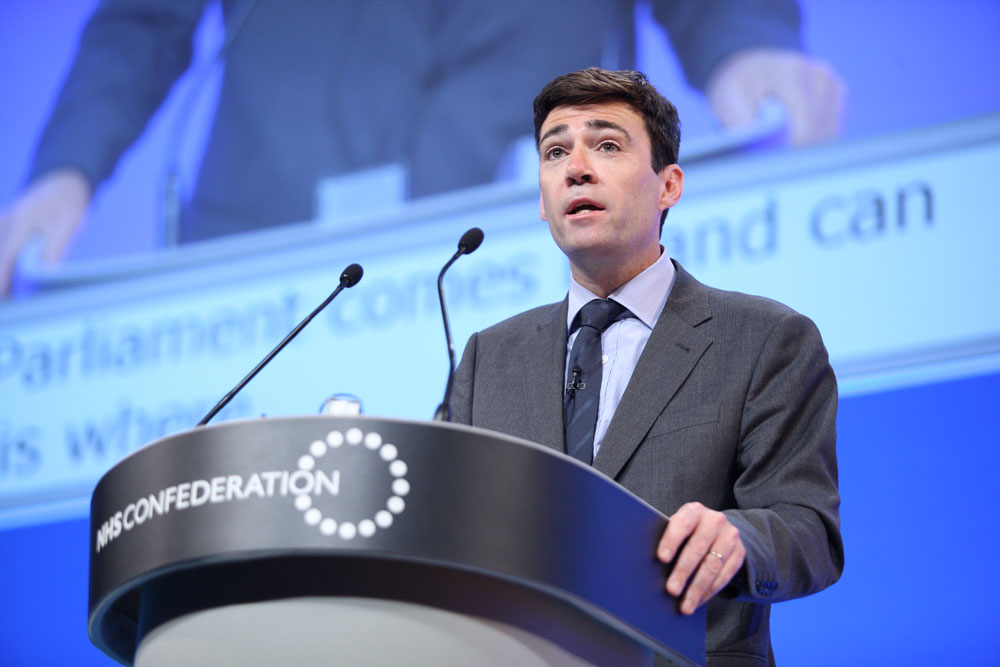
Burnham speaking at the NHS Confederation annual conference in 2014

In May 2010, Burnham became Shadow Secretary of State for Health in the Miliband shadow cabinet. In October 2010, Burnham was appointed Shadow Secretary of State for Education and election co-ordinator for the Labour Party. As shadow education secretary, Burnham opposed the coalition government's plans for "free schools". He argued for moving the education system back towards a comprehensive system. A year later, he was again appointed to the role of Shadow Secretary of State for Health, which he held until 2015.

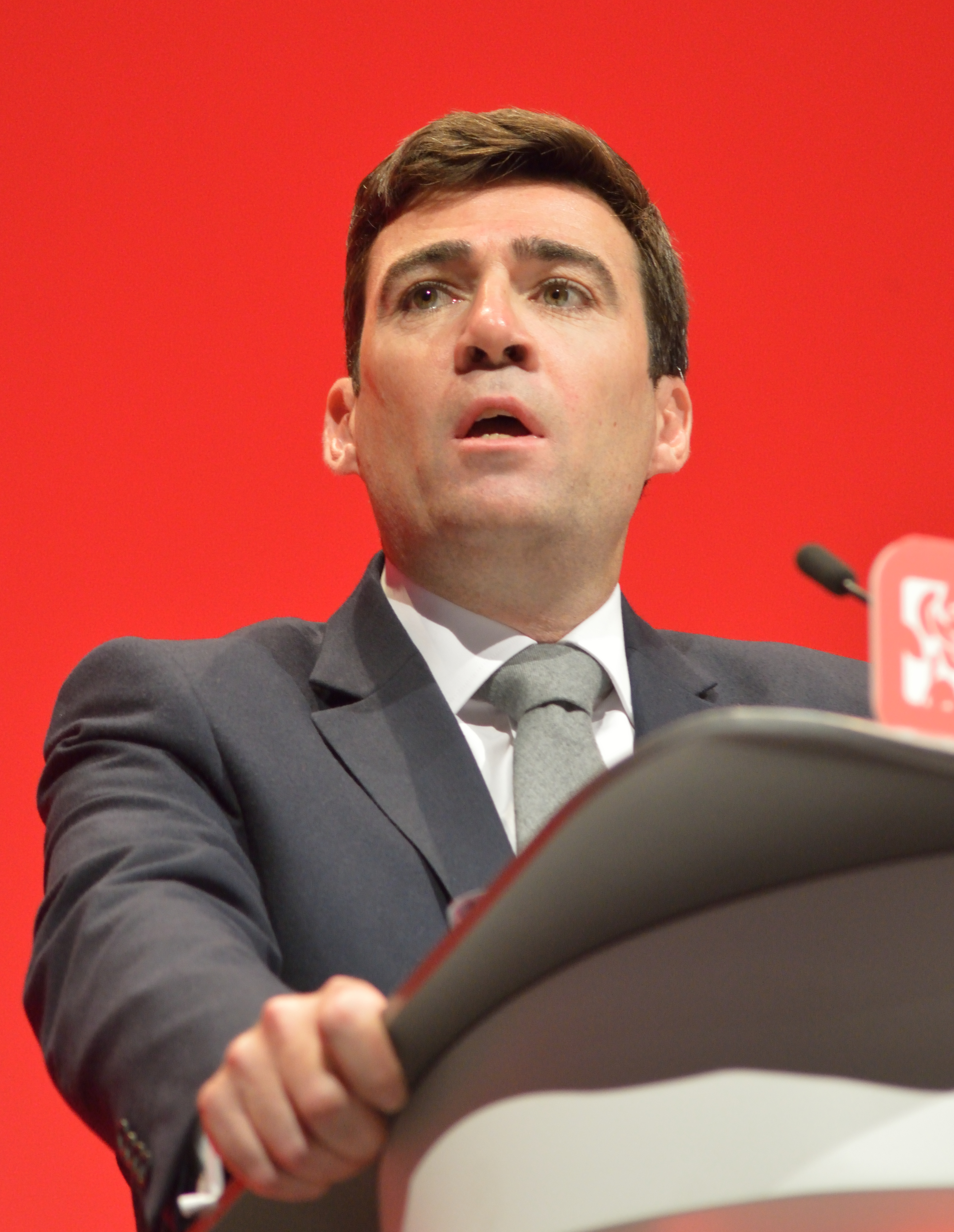
Burnham giving his final Shadow Home Secretary speech at the party conference in 2016

In September 2015, Burnham accepted an appointment as shadow home secretary in the first Corbyn shadow cabinet and remained in the role after the 2016 reshuffle. Burnham opposed the Prevent counter-terrorism strategy. Appearing in 2016 alongside the anti-Prevent organisation MEND, Burnham said: "The Prevent duty to report extremist behaviour is today's equivalent of internment in Northern Ireland."

On 25 April 2017, as his final act in Parliament, he delivered an adjournment debate that lasted over an hour on the infected blood scandal. Burnham used the debate to present a raft of evidence stating "this scandal amounts to a criminal cover-up on an industrial scale" and that "these are criminal acts". He said that if the government did not set up an investigation into the scandal, he would refer his evidence to the police. In July 2017, the then Prime Minister Theresa May announced an independent public inquiry into the scandal, after successive governments since the 1980s had refused to do so. The final report was published on 20 May 2024, concluding that the scandal could have been largely avoided, patients were knowingly exposed to "unacceptable risks", and that doctors, the NHS and the government tried to cover up what happened by "hiding the truth". The then Prime Minister Rishi Sunak apologised for the failures over the scandal, calling it "a decades-long moral failure".

=== Previous leadership campaigns ===
In May 2010, following Brown's resignation as leader of the Labour Party after the formation of the Cameron–Clegg coalition between the Conservatives and Liberal Democrats, Burnham declared his intention to stand in the subsequent leadership contest. He launched his leadership campaign in his Leigh constituency on 26 May. Burnham stood on his philosophy of "aspirational socialism", aligning himself with Intern Aware's campaign to end unpaid internships. He made policy commitments including re-creating the National Care Service, which he had previously introduced as health secretary before its abolition by the Coalition, and replacing inheritance tax with a land value tax. Burnham finished fourth, eliminated on the second ballot with 10.4% of the vote. The leadership contest was won by Ed Miliband.

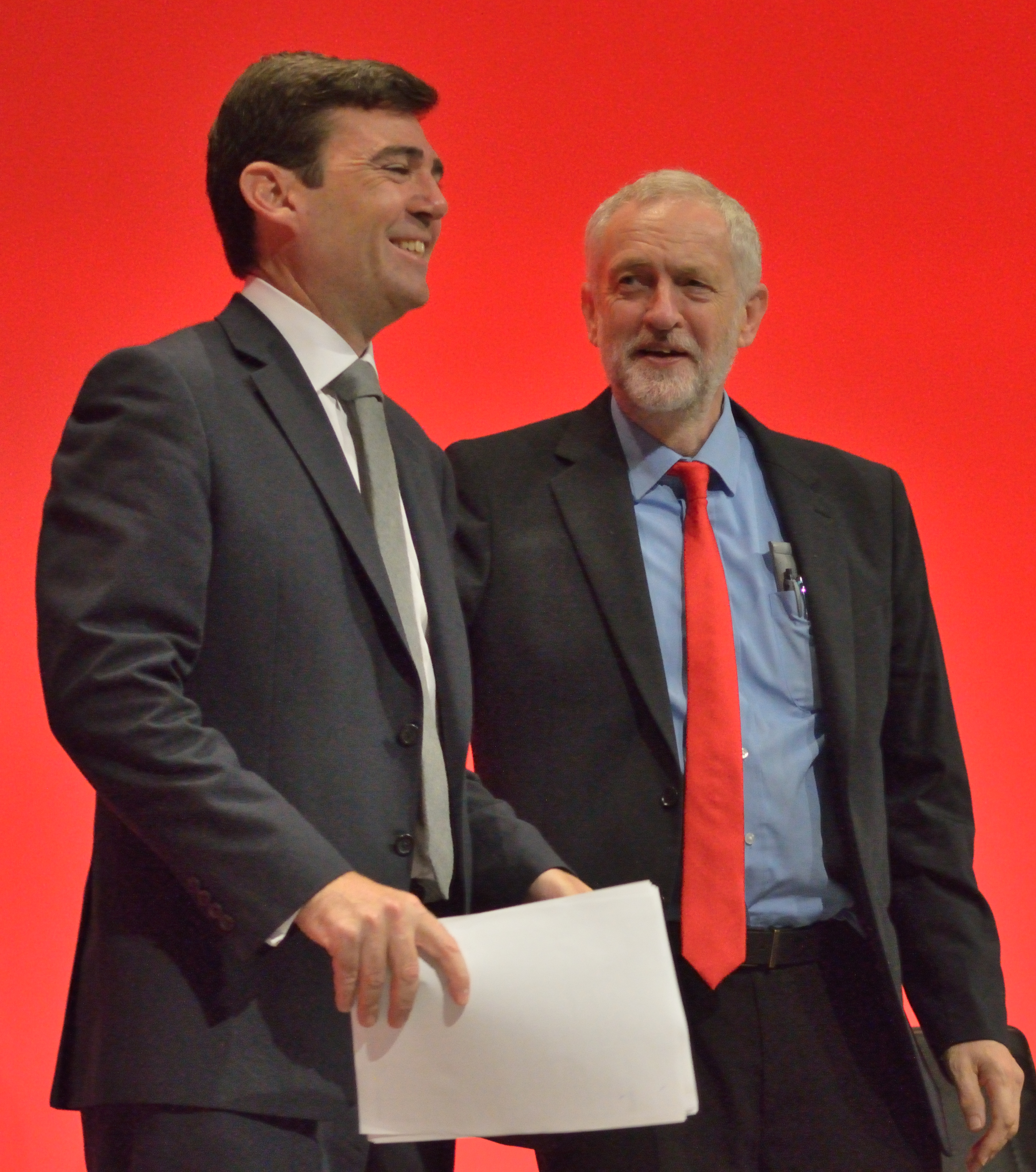
Burnham with Jeremy Corbyn at the 2016 Labour Party Conference

On 13 May 2015, following Labour's defeat in the general election to Cameron's Conservatives, Burnham announced that he would stand to replace Miliband in the 2015 leadership election. He stressed the need to unite the party and country and "rediscover the beating heart of Labour". Burnham was initially considered the frontrunner in the race to succeed Miliband. The emergence of Jeremy Corbyn as the candidate representing the left-wing faction of the party, in June 2015, and the consequent growth in support for Corbyn's campaign saw Burnham's lead diminish to the point that Corbyn overtook him – this was first reflected in a YouGov poll published by The Times on 21 July.

In his official manifesto, Burnham pledged to offer "a balanced plan for a strong economy and sound public finances, providing a genuine alternative to George Osborne's punishing austerity". His platform involved re-balancing the tax system by restoring the 50p income tax rate that had been cut in the 2012 budget. He also signalled that he would not introduce the 'mansion tax' that was included in Labour's 2015 election manifesto, calling the proposal "the politics of envy". His other policies included increasing the minimum wage and scrapping the youth rate, to create a "true living wage for all ages" and abolishing zero-hour contracts and unpaid internships. He also announced that he would address the house price and rent crisis by giving councils greater freedom and increased borrowing powers to build more houses, regulate the private rented sector and introduce a land value tax on commercial properties.

Burnham was criticised in late May 2015 for claiming £17,000 a year from the taxpayer to rent a London flat while owning another within walking distance of the Palace of Westminster. A spokesman for Burnham said that renting out the original flat was necessary to "cover his costs", as parliamentary rule changes meant he was no longer able to claim for mortgage interest expenses. He was also criticised for refusing to be interviewed by The Sun when it emerged he had given an interview to the newspaper during his first run for the Labour leadership, and been photographed in the back of a cab for the newspaper.

In August 2015, Burnham announced that he would commit Labour to "a policy of progressive re-nationalisation" of the railway system. There was some speculation in the media that the announcement was an attempt by the Burnham campaign to align itself further to the left of the party and win back voters it had lost to Corbyn's campaign, as nationalisation had formed a key part of Corbyn's economic policy. He continued to voice his opposition to the TTIP free trade agreement between the European Union and the United States, arguing that it would undermine the National Health Service, as it would "open the floodgates" to private healthcare providers. He was also in favour of building a third runway at Heathrow Airport. In September 2015, Burnham came second to Corbyn in the election, with 19% of the vote in the first round, compared to 59% for Corbyn.

== Mayor of Greater Manchester (2017–2026) ==
=== Candidacy and election ===
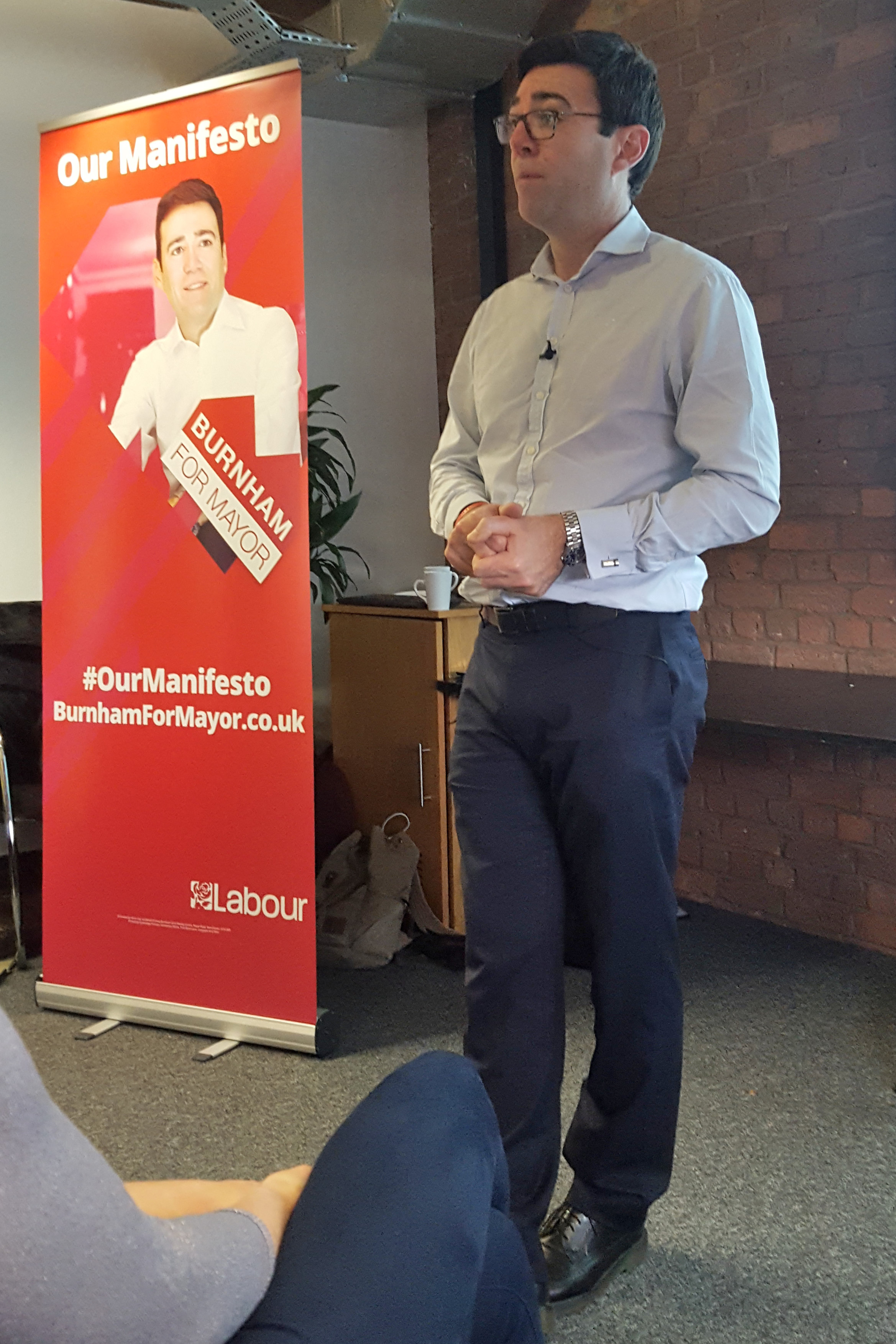
Burnham campaigning for mayor in 2016

On 5 May 2016, a spokesperson for Burnham confirmed that he had been approached by party officials in Greater Manchester, asking him to consider resigning from Corbyn's shadow cabinet in order to run in the upcoming mayoral election in 2017. On 18 May 2016, he confirmed that he was standing for the mayoralty. Burnham was selected as the Labour candidate in August 2016. In September 2016, Burnham said that he would resign as Shadow Home Secretary once a replacement had been found, in order to concentrate on his mayoral bid. He was succeeded by Diane Abbott in October. Burnham said, if elected as Greater Manchester's mayor, he would resign his seat as the member of parliament for Leigh. In the event, the 2017 general election was declared two weeks before the mayoral election, and Burnham did not stand as a candidate for parliament.

Burnham took office as Mayor of Greater Manchester on 8 May 2017. (Note: Burnham was Mayor of Greater Manchester, a county which includes the City of Manchester and surrounding areas. The smaller City of Manchester has a separate council leader, who has executive power (when Burnham stood down, Bev Craig), and a Lord Mayor whose job is mostly ceremonial. It is normal for news writing to shorten Burnham's title to "Manchester mayor", his job as "leading Manchester", or similar phrases.) He received 63% of the vote, winning majorities in all ten of Greater Manchester's boroughs. In his victory speech, he said: "This is the dawn of a new era, not just for this city region but for politics in our country. It has been too London-centric for too long. The old political and party structures haven't delivered for all people and for all places. ... Greater Manchester is going to take control. We are going to change politics and make it work better for people."

At the 6 May 2021 election, Burnham was re-elected mayor with 67% of the vote on a turnout of 34.7%. In the 2024 mayoral election, Burnham was elected for a third term with 63.4% of the vote, on a turnout of 32.5%. This was the first Greater Manchester mayoral election to use the first-past-the-post voting system, with Burnham winning in every ward but one.

On Burnham stepping down as mayor, the local Manchester Evening News (MEN) newspaper gave him positive ratings for economic development and action on homelessness, although it felt he had not been as successful with police management. Its polling reported that he had a 65% approval rating. Jennifer Williams, who covered Burnham for the MEN and Financial Times, felt that Burnham had joined a longstanding "economic project dating back to the 1980s" to boost Manchester's economy and national standing, but had "injected a zeal into defining the city...to the masses" that increased its profile nationally while managing a "byzantine system" of different local authorities and bus operators, and was "loved by his workforce". She felt his career had faced more difficulties with bridging a divide between "Greater Manchester's resurgent city centre and its struggling post-industrial towns" and a tendency to "respond emotionally" to issues like homelessness "and leave the detail for later".

=== Homelessness and housing ===
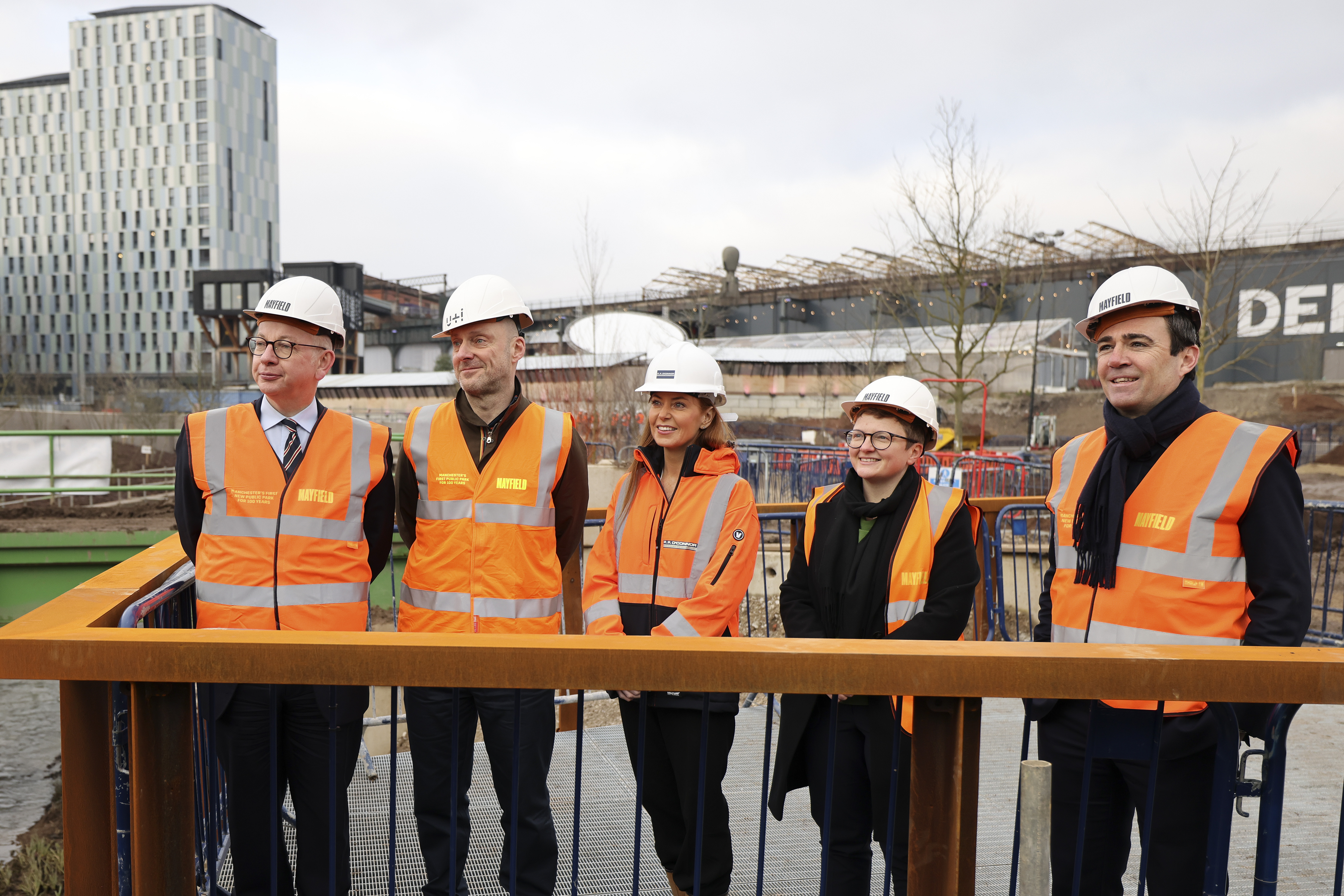
Burnham (right) visiting construction of Mayfield Park with Bev Craig and Michael Gove in 2022

The issue of homelessness in Greater Manchester was a major focus of Burnham's mayoral campaign. He pledged to donate 15% of his mayoral salary to charities tackling homelessness if elected. After his election he outlined his plan to launch a "homelessness fund", with money going to homeless charities and mental health and rehabilitation services. He pledged to end rough sleeping in Greater Manchester by 2020, but in November 2019 he admitted he would miss his target.

As mayor, Burnham continued longstanding local policies of supporting construction, especially of housing and high-rise development; Jacob Reid of Bloomberg News felt that this had succeeded in keeping Manchester's city centre "booming again" after "decades of decline". Burnham opposed adding targets for affordable housing into private construction projects, arguing that it "doesn't work" and deters construction.

=== Public transport ===
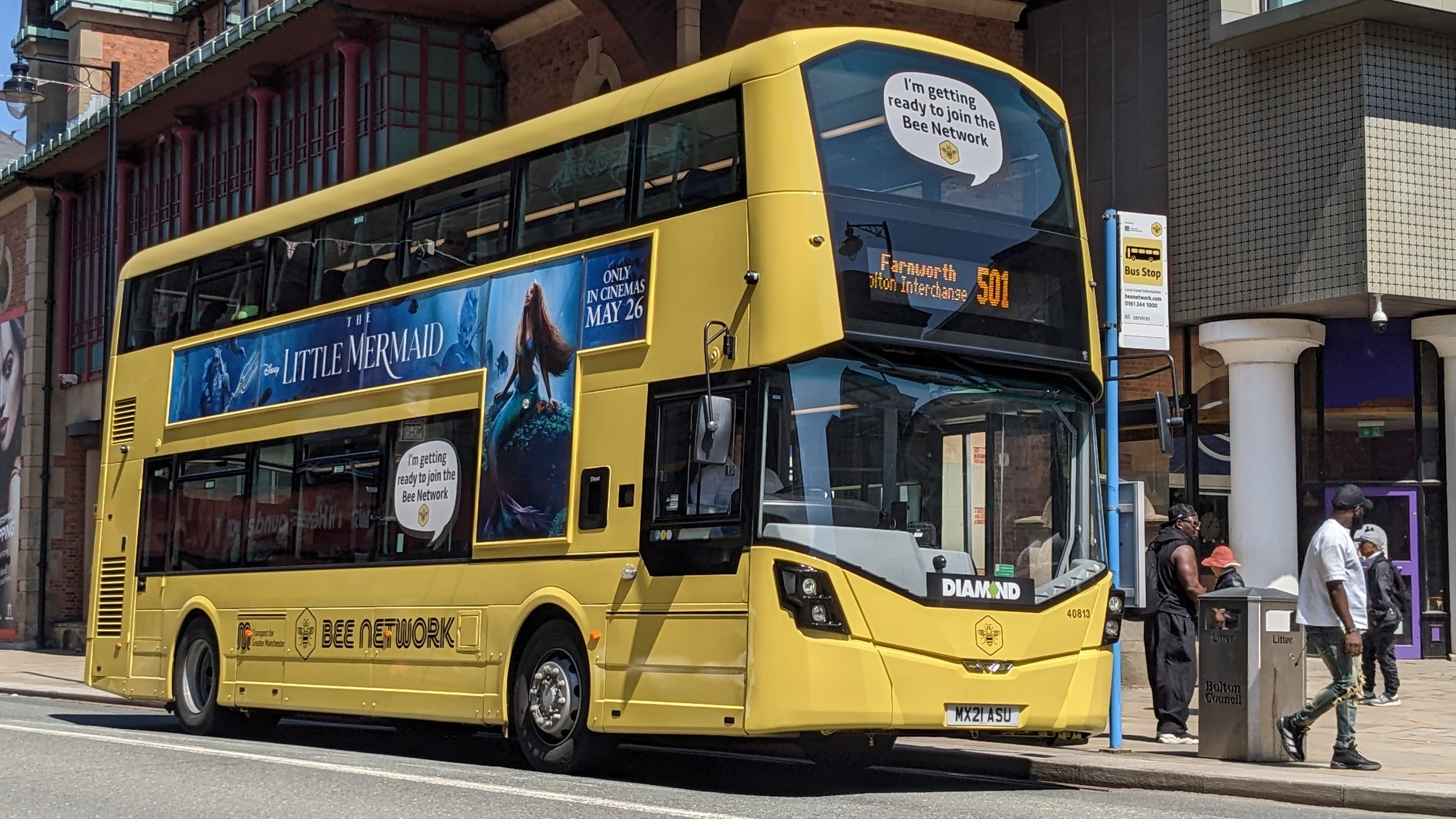
Bee Network bus in 2023

In 2020, Burnham signed off on a new £10 yearly charge for pensioners who wished to continue to use their TFGM travel passes on the region's trains and trams. The charge was intended to help fund a London-style bus system. Residents of London boroughs aged 60 and over qualify for free travel on most public transport in London from the age of 60, while Burnham kept the Manchester system linked to the much later state pension age.

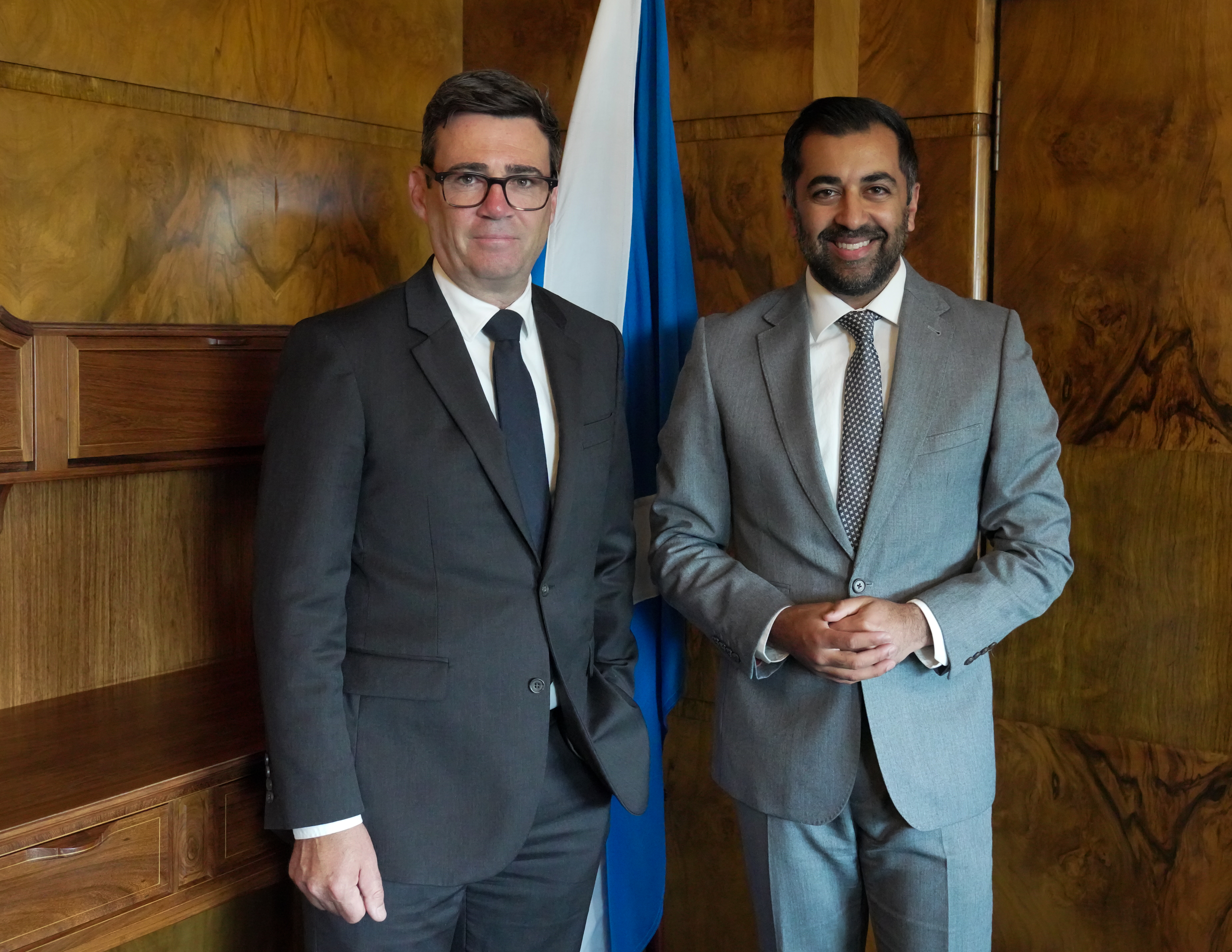
Burnham (left) with then Scottish First Minister Humza Yousaf, 2023

Burnham pledged to bring Manchester's bus network back into public ownership by 2025. The plans were legally challenged by bus operators Stagecoach Group and Rotala, but in March 2022 the mayor and authority won the case at the High Court. The ruling was reported as potentially allowing other English city regions in England to regulate bus services that had been privatised since the 1980s. A £2 cap on adult single bus fares was introduced in September 2022. The integrated transport Bee Network was established in Greater Manchester in 2023.

=== COVID-19 pandemic ===
In March 2020, Burnham called for clearer advice on slowing the spread of the COVID-19 pandemic, citing his previous experience as health secretary during the 2009 swine flu pandemic. He welcomed the additional measures implemented across Greater Manchester and Lancashire by Secretary of State for Health and Social Care Matt Hancock and Chancellor of the Exchequer Rishi Sunak in July during the pandemic, although some areas of north-west England had lower infection rates at the time than the rest of the country.

On 15 October 2020, Burnham, along with other North West leaders, backed away from government talks to place Greater Manchester in tier 3 – the most restrictive level – of a new three-tier categorisation. He cited the grants system for businesses and 80% furlough scheme for employees as insufficient, saying they would push people into poverty and destitution which would outweigh the impact of the virus if mitigated correctly. Many of the concerns, such as the impact on businesses and employees, were shared by local Conservative MPs in Greater Manchester and surrounding areas. For his campaigning to secure more furlough funding, he was dubbed the "King of the North" by the media. He secured less additional funding than he had requested and reduced his request for £90 million to £65 million.

=== Investigations into child sexual exploitation ===
Shortly after first being elected as mayor in 2017, Burnham initiated a review of historical child sexual abuse allegations in Manchester and Rochdale, later expanding the scope of the investigation to Oldham. Part one of the review (focusing on Manchester) reported in 2020, part two (focusing on Oldham) reported in 2022, part three (focusing on Rochdale) reported in 2023 and part four (led by HMICFRS and covering the whole of Greater Manchester) reported in 2025.

In January 2025, Burnham backed calls for a national public inquiry with limited scope into group-based child sexual exploitation and the power to compel people to give evidence. This came a day after the House of Commons voted against an amendment to the Children's Wellbeing and Schools Bill calling for an inquiry. The amendment, proposed by the Conservative Party, had been subject to a whip which prevented Labour MPs from supporting it.

=== Greater Manchester Baccalaureate ===
Following his second re-election in 2024, Burnham expressed his wish to "give everyone growing up [in Manchester] an equal alternative to the university route" through the creation of a baccalaureate in collaboration with local and prospective businesses, with the aim of helping young people in Greater Manchester acquire skills sought by local businesses. The scheme, nicknamed the MBacc, aims to be fully operational by 2030.

=== National profile and resignation ===
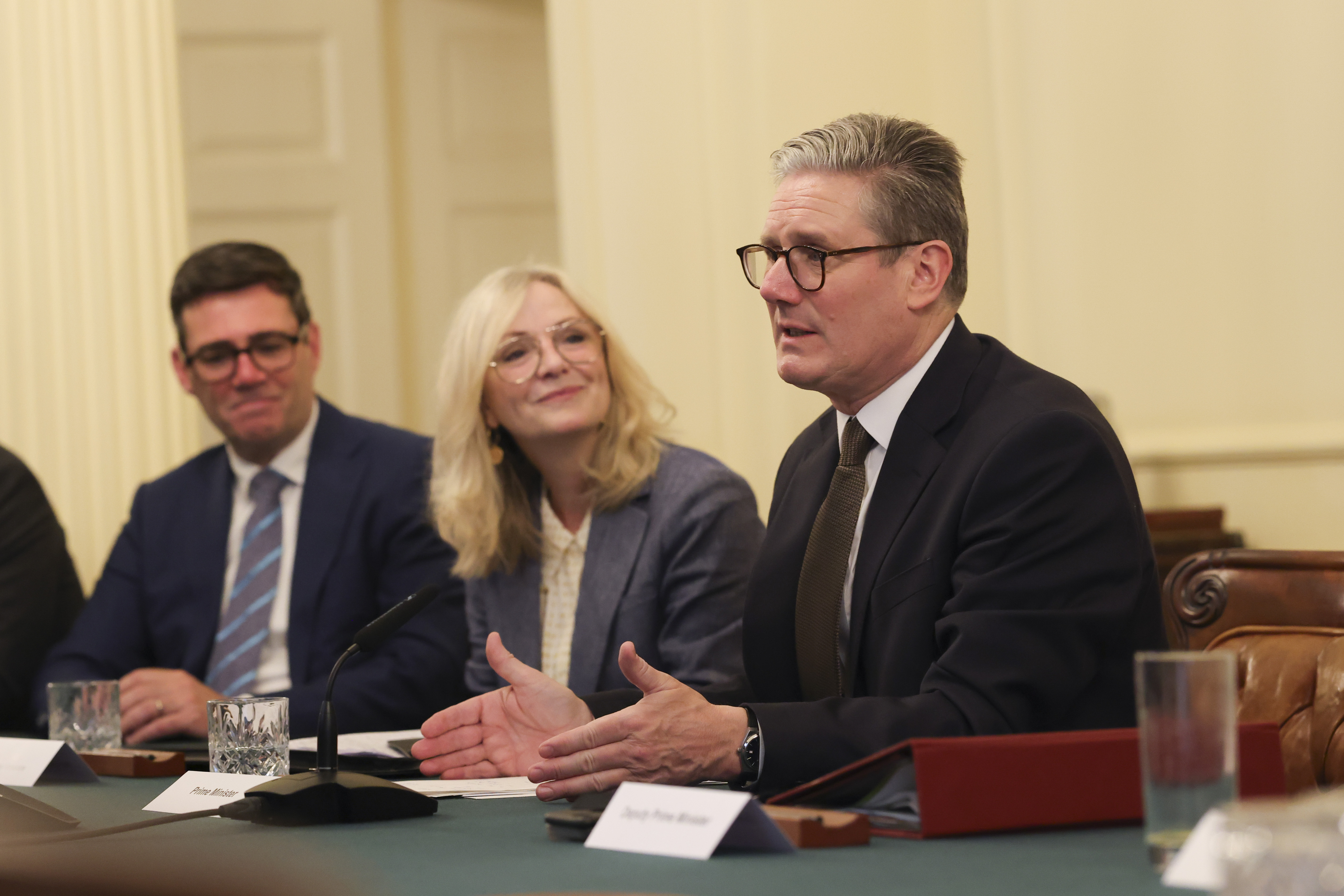
Burnham (left) in a meeting with Mayor of West Yorkshire Tracy Brabin and Prime Minister Keir Starmer, July 2024

Commentators identified Burnham as a potential successor to Labour Party leader and incumbent Prime Minister Keir Starmer, whom he supported during the 2020 leadership election. Following Burnham's re-election in 2021, he emerged as the bookmakers' favourite to become the next Labour leader. Asked about his ambitions, Burnham said his role as mayor was his priority, but made himself available in case "they [Labour] needed me one day in the future". In September 2023, Burnham was ranked twelfth on the New Statesman's Left Power List, described as a "key dissenter" and a "crucial voice" in the party, as well as a potential future party leader.

Starmer went on to win the 2024 general election, returning Labour to government. During the Sky News 2024 general election night broadcast, Burnham served as a guest analyst alongside former Scottish Conservatives leader Ruth Davidson. While Starmer's approval ratings declined, Burnham maintained comparatively high approval ratings in Greater Manchester and, by August 2025, polls identified Burnham as the most popular senior Labour figure.

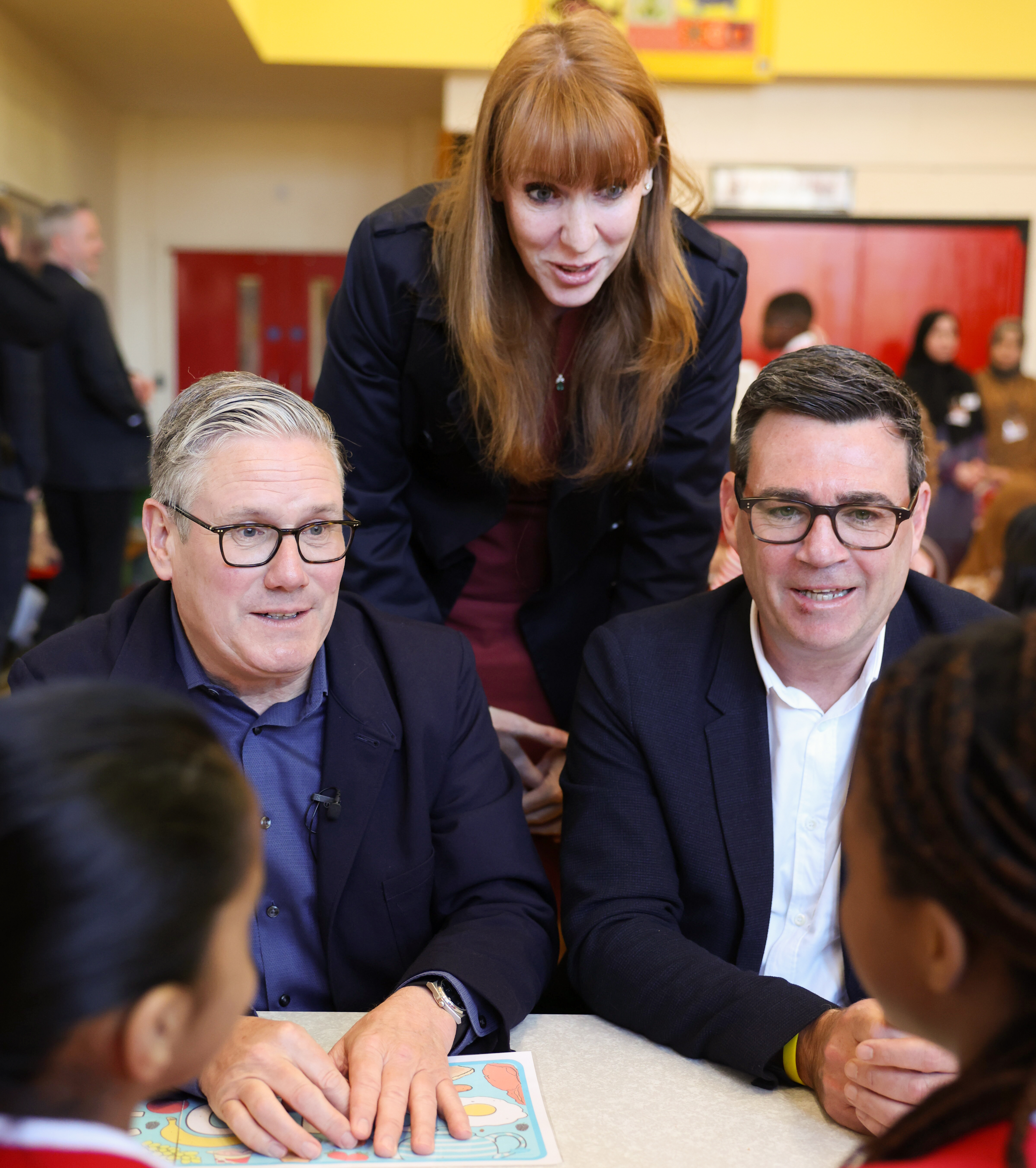
Burnham (right) with Keir Starmer and Angela Rayner during a primary school visit, April 2026

On 24 January 2026, Burnham applied to stand as Labour's candidate in the 2026 Gorton and Denton by-election, but was blocked in an 8–1 vote by the NEC on 25 January 2026. The by-election was ultimately won by the Green candidate Hannah Spencer. Burnham had previously beaten Spencer in the 2024 mayoral election by a margin of 375,000 votes.

The Labour Party's poor performance in the 2026 local elections led to a crisis around Starmer's leadership, during which Burnham was widely speculated to succeed Starmer as prime minister and Labour leader. On 11 May, Angela Rayner said that the NEC blocking Burnham's return to parliament was a mistake. Burnham travelled to London on 12 May to meet MPs.

Following Burnham's by-election victory in Makerfield and subsequent return to parliament in June 2026, Burnham resigned as Mayor of Greater Manchester on 19 June 2026, since MPs are not allowed to hold the office of a mayor with police and crime commissioner powers. The resulting mayoral by-election was set for 30 July 2026, with the winner, Bev Craig – former leader of Manchester City Council, due to serve until the election in 2028. Paul Dennett, the mayor of Salford and Burnham's deputy mayor, served as an interim mayor until the election.

== 2026 leadership campaign ==
=== Return to parliament (2026) ===
On 14 May 2026, Josh Simons, the MP for Makerfield, announced his resignation. He said that he wanted to trigger a by-election in which Burnham could stand, and be eligible to challenge Starmer for the party leadership and premiership if he won. On 19 May 2026, Burnham became Labour's candidate for Makerfield, after no other potential candidate made the shortlist.

The Manchester Evening News reported that Burnham would frame his campaign around trust in politics and "economic renewal", alongside more devolution of local powers. He named house building as one of his priorities for the area, alongside tackling anti-social behaviour by building "youth zones" in the area. He also pledged support for the area's coalfield community. In an interview with ITV News, he denied that he would campaign on a platform of rejoining the European Union, despite his support for the proposal "in the long term"; he also stated that the time had come for Labour to "take on" Reform, and would not be asking other parties to stand down for him.

The campaign's slogan was "Andy — For Us", with a stylised cartoon image of Burnham by Mancunian artist Stanley Chow featured on Labour's campaign material. The Manchester band Oasis gave Burnham permission to use their song "Some Might Say" in the campaign. Reports highlighted Burnham's use of social media during the campaign, with reports that he had been resharing memes and fan account content supporting his candidacy, particularly referencing his daily running routine.

Burnham's victory returned him to the House of Commons for the first time since 2017 and made him eligible to stand in any Labour leadership contest. He won 54.8% of the vote, increasing Labour's majority in Makerfield to 9,231 votes, compared with Josh Simons' 5,399 vote majority over Reform UK at the 2024 general election. Burnham won more votes than all other parties combined, with the Conservative, Liberal Democrat and Green candidates all losing their deposits. Turnout was 58.8%, up from 52.5% in the seat for the 2024 general election, the highest for a parliamentary by-election since Brecon and Radnorshire in 2019, with the third highest rise on a general election since 1945.

In his victory speech, Burnham said Labour had a "final chance to change" and described the result as a possible turning point in British politics. He called for a "Makerfield test" at the heart of national politics, under which policies would be judged by whether they worked for the many regional communities who felt they were consistently overlooked and neglected by Westminster. He also said he would prioritise local needs over party point-scoring, focus on practical problem-solving, seek to heal divisions after the campaign, and support greater powers for the North.

Starmer congratulated Burnham and said the result showed that the tide was turning on Reform UK, which he said had "probably" reached the peak of its support. He also initially said he would stand in any Labour leadership contest and would not "walk away". The result increased pressure on Starmer within the Labour Party, with some Labour figures calling for an orderly leadership transition. News media reported that over 100 Labour MPs were preparing to call on Starmer to resign, while Burnham’s allies suggested that he had the backing of about 300 of Labour’s 403 MPs.

=== Leadership election and transition ===
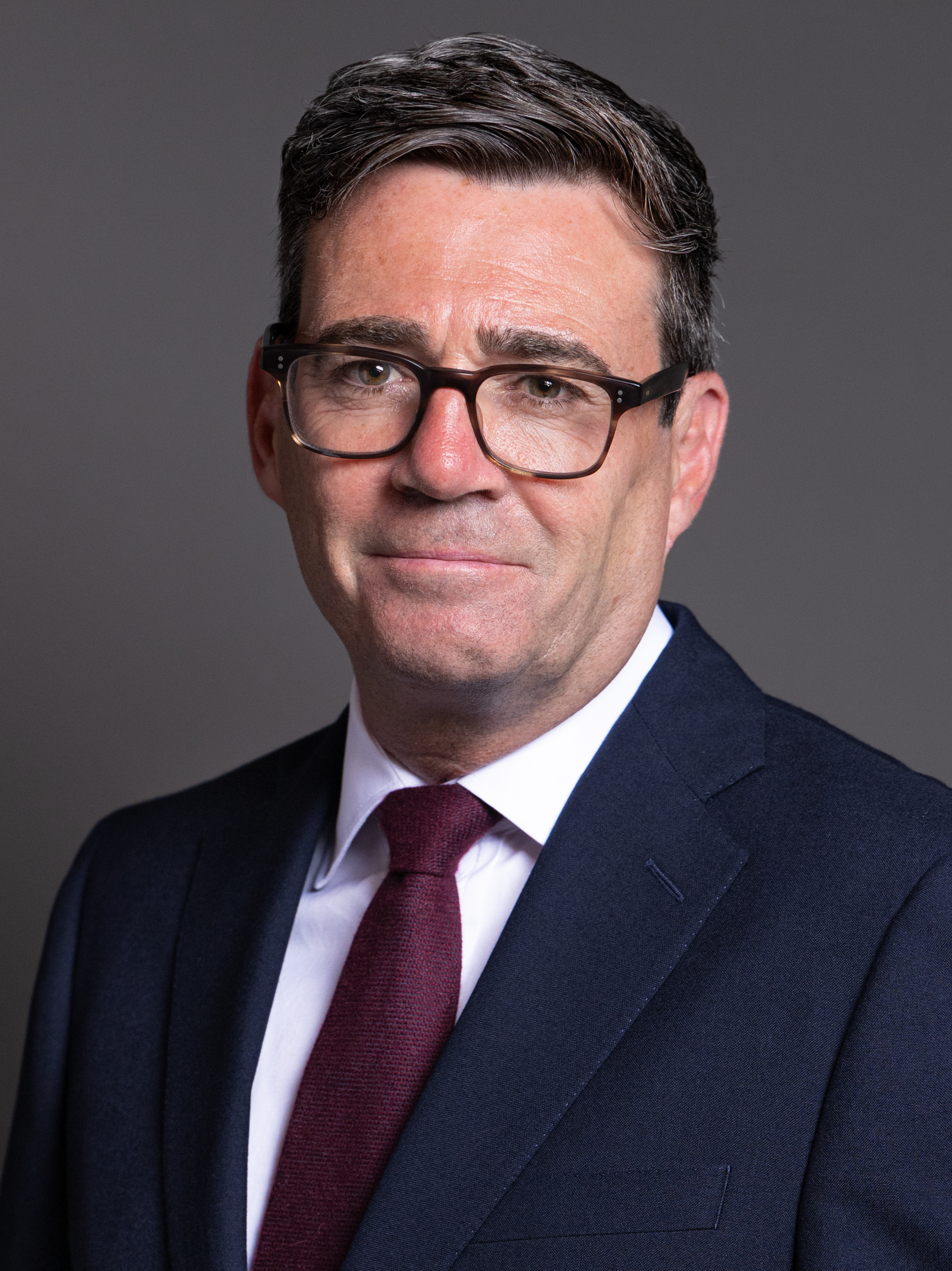
Official parliamentary portrait, 2026

On 22 June 2026, Starmer announced that he would stand down as prime minister, remaining in office until a new leader was elected. In response to Burnham's subsequent announcement that he would stand in the ensuing leadership election, Wes Streeting endorsed him, a move that prompted some commentators to describe the election as a likely "coronation", as Streeting had been considered Burnham's most likely opponent. Burnham was sworn in as an MP later the same day, with BBC News and Sky News covering his train journey from Manchester to London. Burnham was already widely seen as Starmer's likely successor; he was the only declared candidate and had received a significant number of endorsements.

Burnham secured nominations from 349 MPs for the leadership election by 13 July, making it mathematically impossible for anyone else to stand (under Labour rules, a leadership candidate must be nominated by 20 per cent of the party's MPs in order to stand). By the close of nominations on 15 July, Burnham had secured 379 nominations, more than 90% of Labour MPs. He was therefore elected unopposed on 17 July.

== Premiership (2026–present) ==
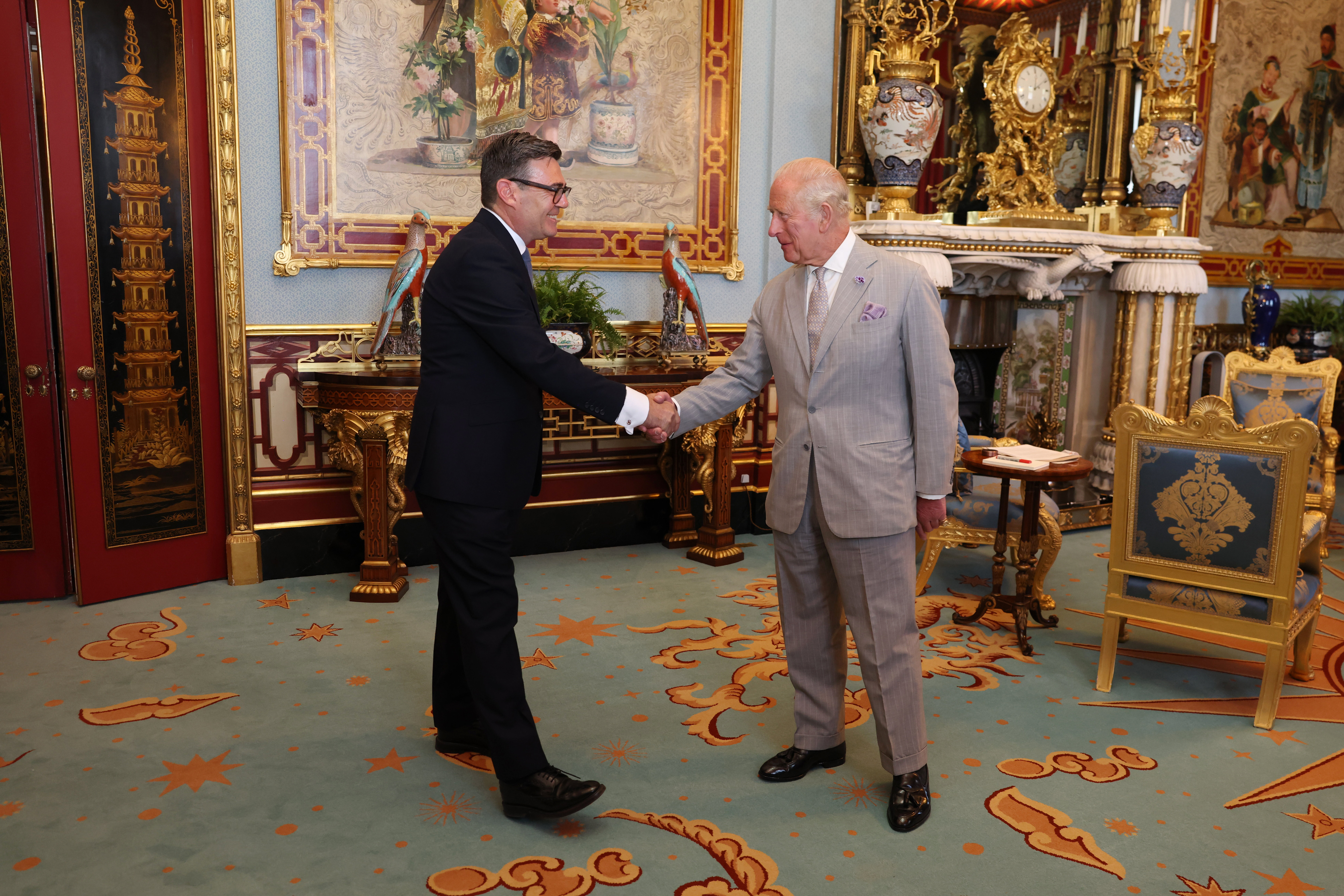
Burnham being received by Charles III at Buckingham Palace to be invited to form a government, in 2026

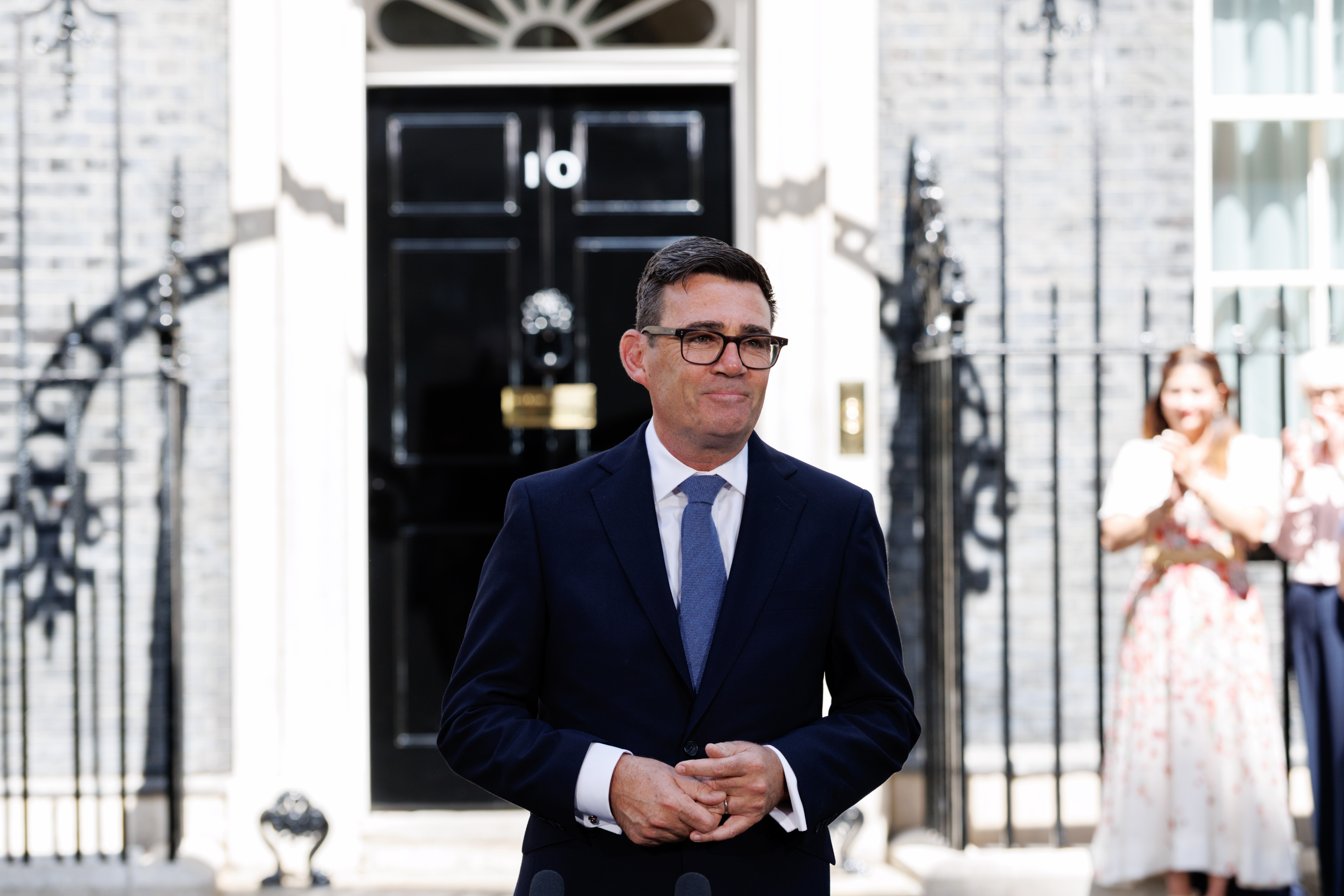
Burnham giving his first speech as Prime Minister

=== Appointment ===
As the leader of the majority party in the House of Commons, Burnham was appointed prime minister, First Lord of the Treasury and Minister for the Civil Service by King Charles III on 20 July 2026. Burnham and his wife, Marie-France van Heel, were driven from Buckingham Palace to Downing Street. Upon taking office, Burnham became the first prime minister to have been raised Catholic and the first to belong to the Co-operative Party.

In his first speech as prime minister, Burnham said he was "acutely conscious" of being the sixth prime minister in ten years, and vowed to bring power "out of here and carry it into every postcode in the land".

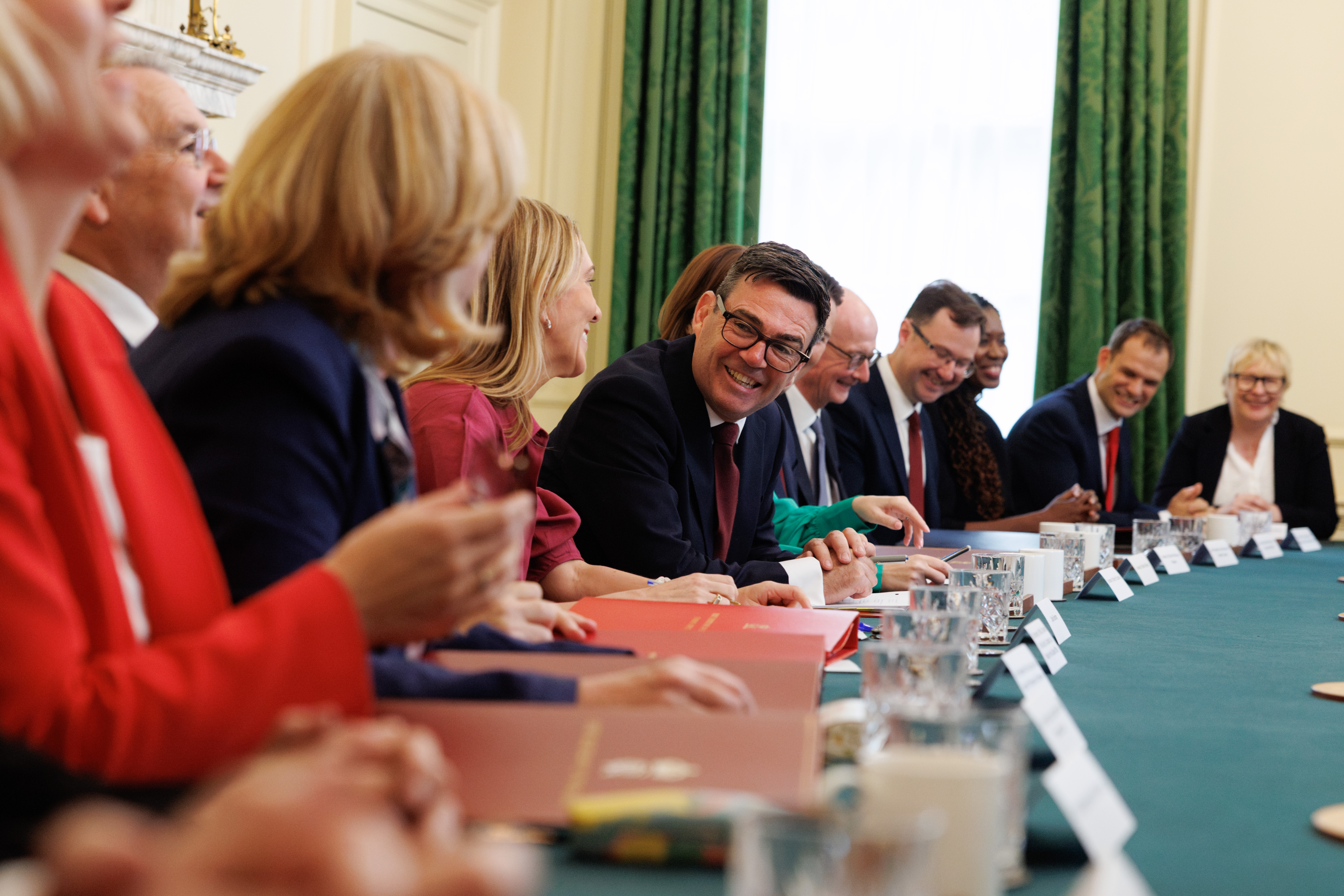
Burnham holding his first cabinet meeting

Burnham with his cabinet in September 2026

=== Cabinet ===
Burnham started to form his cabinet on 20 July 2026, which first met on 21 July, and he completed his ministerial appointments on 22 July. The initial appointments resulted in major cabinet changes, involving the removal of several close Starmer allies, while appointing some politicians who had criticised Starmer. Key departures from the previous ministry included Rachel Reeves, who was removed as Chancellor after reportedly turning down an alternative role; David Lammy, who was dismissed as Deputy Prime Minister and Justice Secretary; Business Secretary Peter Kyle; Housing Secretary Steve Reed; Attorney General Lord Hermer; Chief Secretary to the Prime Minister, Chancellor of the Duchy of Lancaster and Minister for Intergovernmental Affairs Darren Jones; and Science, Innovation and Technology Secretary Liz Kendall, whose department was dissolved. Fifteen ministers were dismissed from the cabinet.

Following the major dismissals, Burnham began selecting the senior members of his government, making many high-profile appointments and retentions. John Healey returned to government as Chancellor of the Exchequer, while Ed Miliband was promoted to Foreign Secretary from his former Energy and Net Zero brief. Close ally Louise Haigh was appointed First Secretary of State, Chancellor of the Duchy of Lancaster, and Minister for the Cabinet Office (his de facto Deputy Prime Minister). Angela Rayner returned to government in her previous post of Housing Secretary, Yvette Cooper was reshuffled to become Health Secretary and Wes Streeting re-joined the cabinet with his appointment as Defence Secretary. Jonathan Reynolds was promoted to the newly expanded brief of Business, Science, Innovation and Trade Secretary, while Labour Deputy Leader Lucy Powell became Education Secretary, and Emma Reynolds was appointed as Chief Secretary to the Treasury. Retentions from Starmer's cabinet included Shabana Mahmood as Home Secretary, Pat McFadden as Work and Pensions Secretary, Alan Campbell as Leader of the Commons, Lisa Nandy as Culture Secretary, and Heidi Alexander as Transport Secretary.

Burnham's cabinet is the first in history with a majority of female ministerial appointments, with 12 of the 23 members of the cabinet (which includes the Prime Minister) being women. Two additional female ministers also attend cabinet meetings.

=== Domestic policy ===
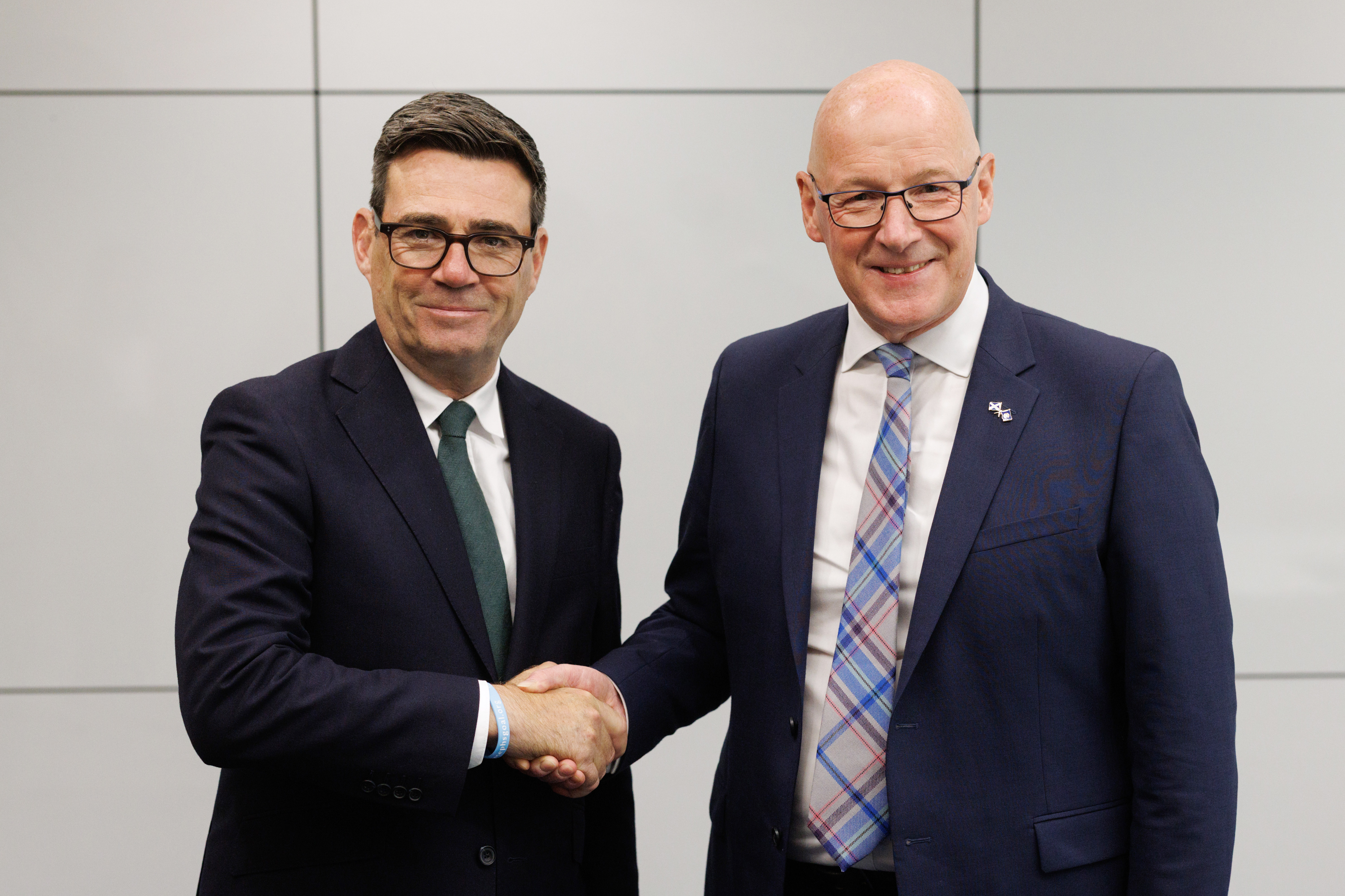
Burnham with Scottish First Minister John Swinney, 2026

In his first speech as prime minister, Burnham mentioned re-industrialisation, mitigating the cost-of-living crisis, education system reform, construction of council homes, and ending rough sleeping as priorities. An additional £340 million is to be allocated to tackling rough sleeping over the course of three years.

The removal of the 5% value-added tax on household electricity bills in England, Scotland, and Wales is scheduled for October 2026. The cut will not apply in Northern Ireland, where European Union VAT rates apply; instead, the Northern Irish government will be allocated its own funding for cost-of-living measures. The government claimed the policy will be funded with savings from scrapping Starmer's planned digital ID scheme.

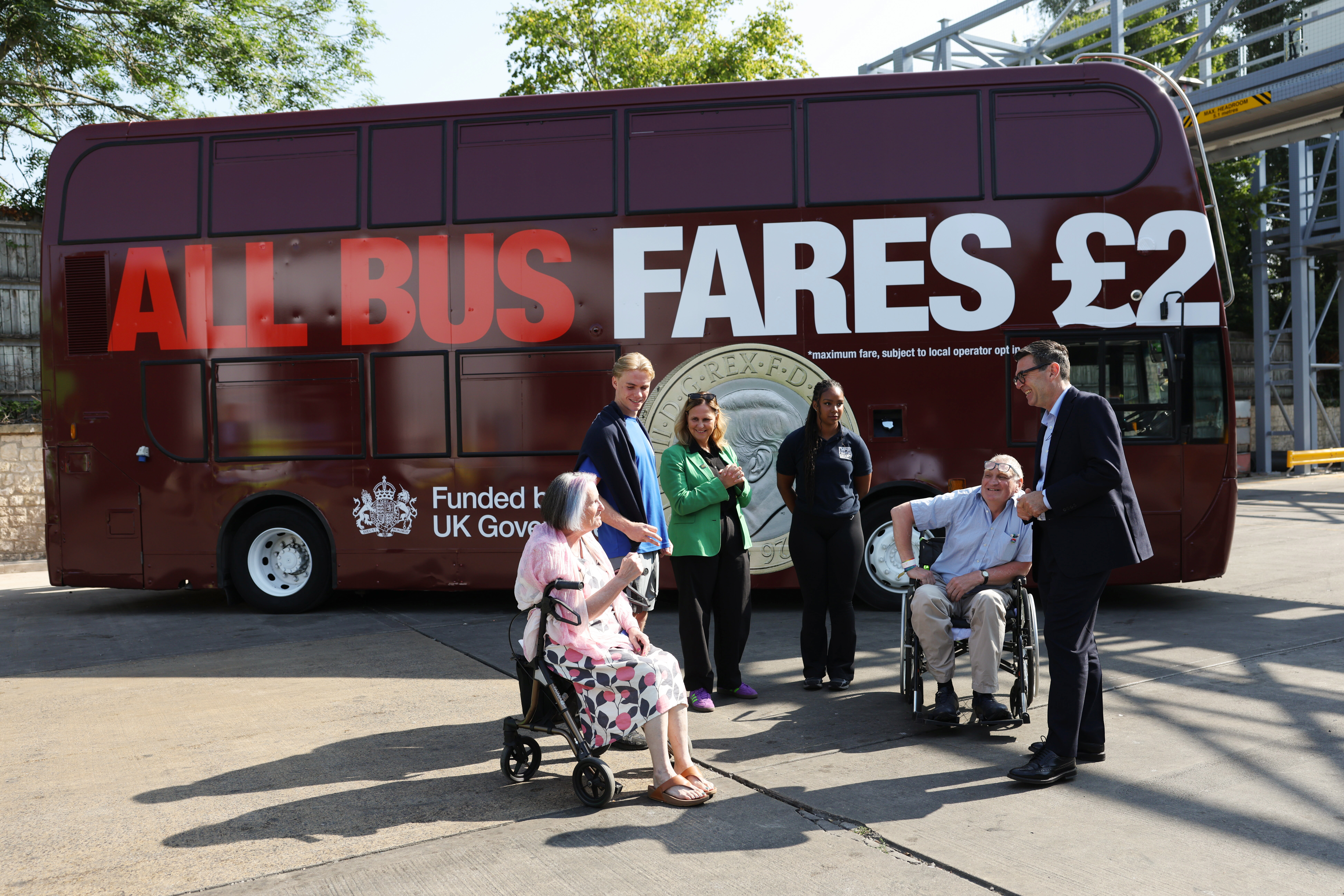
Burnham announcing plans to cap bus fares at £2 from 2027

Single bus fares in England (except London) are to be capped at £2 from January 2027 to December 2027. As of July 2026, England's nationwide cap was £3, which was planned under Starmer's premiership to expire in March 2027. Money is to be allocated for the devolved governments to take similar action. Approximately £400 million of the scheme's expected cost (more than £500 million) is to be funded by replacing international climate-related grants with loans. Business rates for English pubs, clubs, and live music venues are planned to be reduced by 20% from April 2027. The reduction is to be targeted, excluding music venues that do not meet the eligibility criteria. In July 2026, Burnham paused the implementation of the prisoner early release scheme under the Sentencing Act 2026 in England and Wales, which was previously scheduled for September 2026, to review the scheme.

In addition to maintaining an office at 10 Downing Street in London, Burnham established Number 10 North, an office based initially at Heron House and scheduled to move to Manchester Digital Campus upon its completion in 2032. Both locations were grouped together under a new Office for the Prime Minister and the Cabinet, overseen by Louise Haigh, First Secretary of State. Burnham is expected to work at Number 10 North at least one day per week, barring scheduling conflicts. Relocation packages to work at Number 10 North have been offered to civil servants based in London. Burnham is open to expanding devolution of policing to Wales.

=== Foreign policy ===
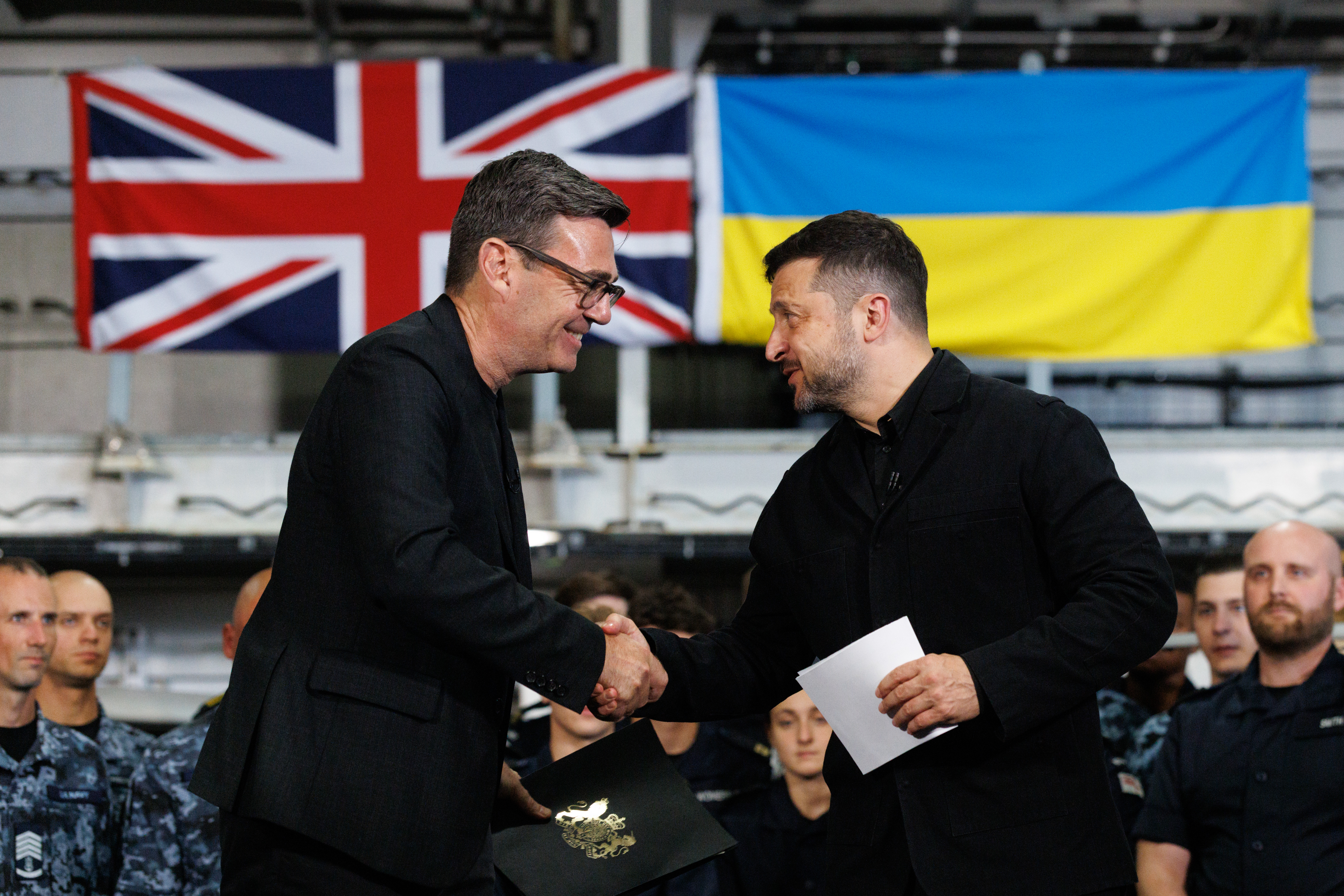
Burnham with Ukrainian president Volodymyr Zelenskyy, July 2026.

Burnham with US president Donald Trump in September 2026

Burnham held introductory phone calls with United States president Donald Trump, Ukrainian president Volodymyr Zelenskyy, and European Commission president Ursula von der Leyen shortly after taking office on 20 July 2026. In his first official international conversation, Burnham congratulated President Trump on the United States' hosting of the World Cup, outlined plans for British reindustrialisation, and extended an invitation to visit Manchester for the upcoming G20 summit, while Trump detailed that they discussed trade, North Sea oil, and military alliances. During his subsequent dialogue with President Zelenskyy, Burnham reaffirmed that the United Kingdom's diplomatic, military, and political backing for Ukraine amidst the Russian invasion remains steadfast and unchanged under his new government. To conclude his initial round of foreign diplomacy, Burnham spoke with Ursula von der Leyen to express a desire to build a closer and more ambitious relationship with the European Union, resulting in an agreement for their respective teams to coordinate toward a UK-EU summit later in the year.

== Political views ==
Burnham has said that he joined the Labour Party at the age of 15. He identifies as a socialist. In his 2010 leadership bid Burnham emphasised his philosophy of "aspirational socialism", which he described as redistributive, collectivist and internationalist. He has been cited as being a social democrat, favouring stronger public services but not fully opposing a market economy.

Burnham has expressed opposition to nationalism, which he has described as an "ugly brand of politics". In 2020, Iain Martin of The Times described Burnham as a "former Blairite" and associated with New Labour. In a 2010 interview on The Andrew Marr Show, Burnham said New Labour "did great things during its thirteen years in office" but "there was a perception that we weren't listening to people." As mayor of Greater Manchester, Burnham rejected the approach taken by New Labour on housing and transport, but remained committed to its "tough on crime, tough on the causes of crime" approach. Politically, Burnham places himself on the soft left of the Labour Party. He has been described as soft left by a number of media outlets, including the Financial Times, the New Statesman, and LabourList. Following his election as Labour Party leader in 2026, Burnham described Neil Kinnock, Labour's leader when he joined the party, as his inspiration.

=== Manchesterism ===
Burnham has used the term "Manchesterism" for the political philosophy underpinning his policy agenda as mayor of Greater Manchester – not to be confused with the 19th-century pro-free-trade Manchester Liberalism associated with Richard Cobden and John Bright, also known as Manchesterism. Burnham has characterised Manchesterism as "the end of neo-liberalism", "business-friendly socialism" and "a modern and functional response to the high-inequality, low-growth trap that came from the 1980s drive to privatise economic power and overcentralise political power in the Treasury". In a speech to the Centre for Cities, Burnham described it as a perspective that aimed to combine economic development with social benefits, with policies designed to explicitly channel the proceeds of growth towards communities, rejecting trickle-down economics. Described as elements of social democracy, examples of such policies he cited included re-establishing public control of buses through the creation of the Bee Network, and the Good Growth Fund, which provided £1 billion for three projects in each of Greater Manchester's boroughs. He stressed that such initiatives were only possible due to devolution, countering historical trends of political centralisation, although he also advocated for increased devolution of fiscal powers.

Burnham has also argued that the cost-of-living crisis of the 2020s has roots in neoliberalism, suggesting that the deregulation and privatisation of the 1980s led to increases in the costs of essential goods, and citing the effects of Right to Buy on the rental market as contributing to increased state expenditure on Housing Benefit. He contends that such problems were exacerbated by government austerity and Brexit. Manchesterism has also been characterised as embodying collaboration and partnership working between stakeholders, including cooperation between government, business and trade unions, different public services, community groups, and administrations of different political complexions among Greater Manchester's borough councils.

Writing for the Financial Times in May 2026, Stephen Bush argued that the policy offer Burnham was making as a prospective Labour Party leader was to the left of the policy he had actually implemented during his mayoralty, which in turn was to the right of the stance of the Starmer ministry. Bush suggested that this may have been due to the institutional constraints on, and weaknesses of, the metro mayor role. In a January 2026 piece for the London Review of Books, Michael Chessum compared Manchesterism's emphasis on moving away from neoliberalism to the approaches to governance advocated by the socialist parties of Spain and Portugal.

=== Economics ===
In his 2015 leadership bid, Burnham pledged to commit Labour to "a policy of progressive renationalisation of the railway system". Following the 2024 general election, Labour steadily progressed with the previous Conservative government's plan to nationalise the railway system, aiming for completion by 2027. Burnham also favours a universal graduate tax to replace student tuition fees. He has advocated a National Care Service, integrating care services into the National Health Service. In his leadership bid, Burnham's key economic policies included a new levy to fund social care, extending the higher minimum wage to under-25s, and banning zero-hour contracts. Burnham described the mansion tax proposed by Ed Miliband as "the politics of envy", saying he knew it would lose votes when his mother phoned and told him it represented a return to the 1970s.

In December 2016 during his initial mayoral campaign Burnham argued the UK needed to leave the European Single Market to allow greater scope for government intervention in Northern industries.

In May 2026, Burnham vowed to put energy, housing, water and transport under "stronger public control". He has said that Thames Water should be nationalised.

The Office for Budget Responsibility cited the UK's triple lock pension system as a major factor contributing to uncertainty in the public finances. Under the system, pensions rise by the highest of 2.5%, average earnings growth or inflation. The cost was expected to rise from 5% to 9% of GDP in the next 50 years. Burnham has proposed reforming the triple lock from 2030–31. The government estimates that the change will save £15 billion a year by 2039–40, although the Institute for Fiscal Studies cautions that the actual saving is highly uncertain. The Institute for Fiscal Studies welcomed the reform as a substantial step towards a more sustainable and predictable state pension system.

=== Devolution ===
Burnham is a strong supporter of devolving power and, in his 2015 leadership campaign, criticised the "Westminster Bubble" – the London-centric focus in British politics and perceived detachment from life outside Westminster. Some opponents and political commentators accused him of being a part of the same bubble he criticises. He views devolution of powers to Greater Manchester (including its elected mayor) as an opportunity for urban regeneration. He also called for a focus on Northern identity. After he was elected as mayor of Greater Manchester, he described the new powers for northern cities as "the dawn of a new era". Burnham feels the government does not invest enough money in the North of England, saying: "Almost five years after the government promised us a northern powerhouse, we learn that public spending in the north has fallen while rising in the south. This has got to stop and it is time that the north came to the front of the queue for public investment".

In June 2026, Burnham announced Number 10 North, which he described as being to "oversee the biggest rebalancing of power our country has ever seen". He said that Number 10 North would be the "nerve centre of a rewired Britain". Burnham set out three "clear tasks" for Number 10 North: to increase public ownership of essential utilities such as water, energy and housing, to re-industrialise swathes of the country, and to regenerate towns, prioritising places that had been left behind. Upon establishment, Number 10 North additionally assumed responsibility for English devolution and local economic growth strategy from the Ministry of Housing, Communities and Local Government (MHCLG), and local economic growth policy from HM Treasury. After Burnham became prime minister on 20 July 2026, it was reported that Number 10 North was already up and running with Heron House, an existing government building in Manchester city centre, which is partially occupied by GCHQ, serving as its interim headquarters. Its first meeting was scheduled for 24 July 2026 to revive the National Economic Council, bringing together government ministers and regional mayors.

=== Immigration ===
In 2016, as Shadow Home Secretary, Burnham opposed migration caps. Burnham also opposed a bill requiring landlords to conduct immigration checks for illegal immigrants.

In 2017, Burnham argued that ending freedom of movement should be prioritised over the economic benefits of single market membership during the UK's Brexit negotiations.

It was reported in May 2026 that Burnham supports Home Secretary Shabana Mahmood's efforts to limit legal and illegal immigration. The same month, he stood back from past calls to scrap the "no recourse to public funds" rule, which prevents immigrants getting access to benefits or public housing before being granted settled status.

=== Foreign policy ===
==== Iraq War (2003) ====
Burnham voted in favour of British military intervention in the 2003 invasion of Iraq, aligning with the stance of then-Prime Minister Tony Blair and US President George W. Bush. He has since described the vote as "traumatising on every level" and his "worst experience" in Parliament. In his 2024 book Head North, Burnham expressed deep regret for his decision, stating, "If I had my time again, I wouldn't have voted for it". He criticised the "rage rhetoric and haste" driven by the Blair and Bush administrations, while criticising the lack of a viable post-war stabilisation plan.

==== United States ====
Burnham's stance on the United States mixes political criticism with practical diplomacy. His economic and trade proposals have drawn comparisons with Joe Biden's policies on manufacturing and workers' rights. He also has long-standing ties to US Democrats; his Director of Political Strategy, Matthew McGregor, worked on Barack Obama's 2012 campaign. By contrast, Burnham has been highly critical of Donald Trump, once urging UK voters to reject the "divided, dark politics" seen in America.

Since becoming Prime Minister, Burnham has tried to build a working relationship with the Trump administration. In their first phone call, Burnham pointed to his plan to raise UK defence spending to 3.5% of GDP and his decision to let US forces use British bases for strikes against Iran. Trump's public response to Burnham has shifted over time. He initially dismissed Burnham as "the mayor of a town" and "extremely liberal", but later praised Burnham's North Sea oil policies, saying they would make the UK "one of the richest countries anywhere." Tensions remain, however, because Burnham appointed Ed Miliband—a vocal Trump critic—as Foreign Secretary, which angered White House officials.

==== NATO ====
During the 2015 Labour leadership race, Burnham said he would resign from the shadow cabinet if Labour supported leaving NATO, warning that he would quit the Shadow Cabinet if the party ever backed leaving NATO. This was a direct challenge to Corbyn, who had questioned the military alliance and suggested that Britain should withdraw.

==== China ====
Burnham has viewed relations with China primarily through the lens of economic development. As Mayor of Greater Manchester, he visited China in 2018, where he said China's high-speed rail and infrastructure made a strong impression. During a meeting with the Chinese consul Tang Rui in April 2026, Burnham supported closer cooperation "in areas such as green development, electric buses, advanced manufacturing and life sciences".

==== Ukraine and Russia ====
Burnham has supported Ukraine since the 2022 Russian invasion of Ukraine amidst the wider Russo-Ukrainian war, stating, "We must not allow Russia to prevail... It is essential that we continue to support Ukraine in every possible way". In 2014, as the shadow health secretary, he condemned the 2014 Russian annexation of Crimea and argued Russia should not be allowed to host the 2018 FIFA World Cup.

As Mayor of Greater Manchester, he practised this stance by establishing the Unbroken Cities Network alongside the mayors of Lviv and Liverpool to support municipal recovery and rehabilitation programmes for injured Ukrainians.

Upon succeeding Starmer as Prime Minister on 20 July 2026, Burnham reiterated his support for Ukraine in his new capacity as prime minister. On his first day in office, he held a phone call with Zelenskyy. During the conversation, Burnham reaffirmed that the UK's "steadfast and resolute" commitment to Ukraine would remain unchanged under his leadership, promising to stand with him "100%".

==== Israel and Palestine ====
During the 2015 leadership campaign, Burnham pledged that his first overseas trip would be to Israel and joined Labour Friends of Israel. He also described the Boycott, Divestment and Sanctions (BDS) movement as "spiteful." However, following the outbreak of the Gaza war in October 2023, he became one of the first high-profile Labour figures to break ranks with then-leader Keir Starmer by publicly calling for a ceasefire. While condemning the 7 October attacks, Burnham cited profound concerns over civilian casualties and the humanitarian blockade. He has consistently backed a two-state solution, denounced illegal West Bank settlements, and co-signed a June 2025 letter demanding the protection of Palestinian statehood—which the previous Starmer government subsequently recognised that September. Speaking on 9 July 2026, Burnham apologised for the initial stance Labour took toward the conflict, stating that the UK had been too slow to call for a ceasefire and needed to apply more pressure on the Israeli government. He also called for accountability through the international courts.

==== Iran ====
Burnham has been highly critical of direct Western military engagement in the 2026 Iran war. In March 2026, following a joint US-Israeli offensive ordered by US President Donald Trump and Israeli Prime Minister Benjamin Netanyahu that killed Iran's Supreme Leader Ali Khamenei, Burnham warned that the conflict directly paralleled the strategic failures of the Iraq War. He criticised assumptions underlying Western military interventions, arguing that the idea that you can "take out a leader and then the whole of the population there just unites behind that change... is simplistic". Burnham urged caution and diplomacy, calling on leaders like Trump and Netanyahu not to rush headlong into the conflict without a thorough, viable plan for the regional aftermath.

=== Sexuality and gender ===
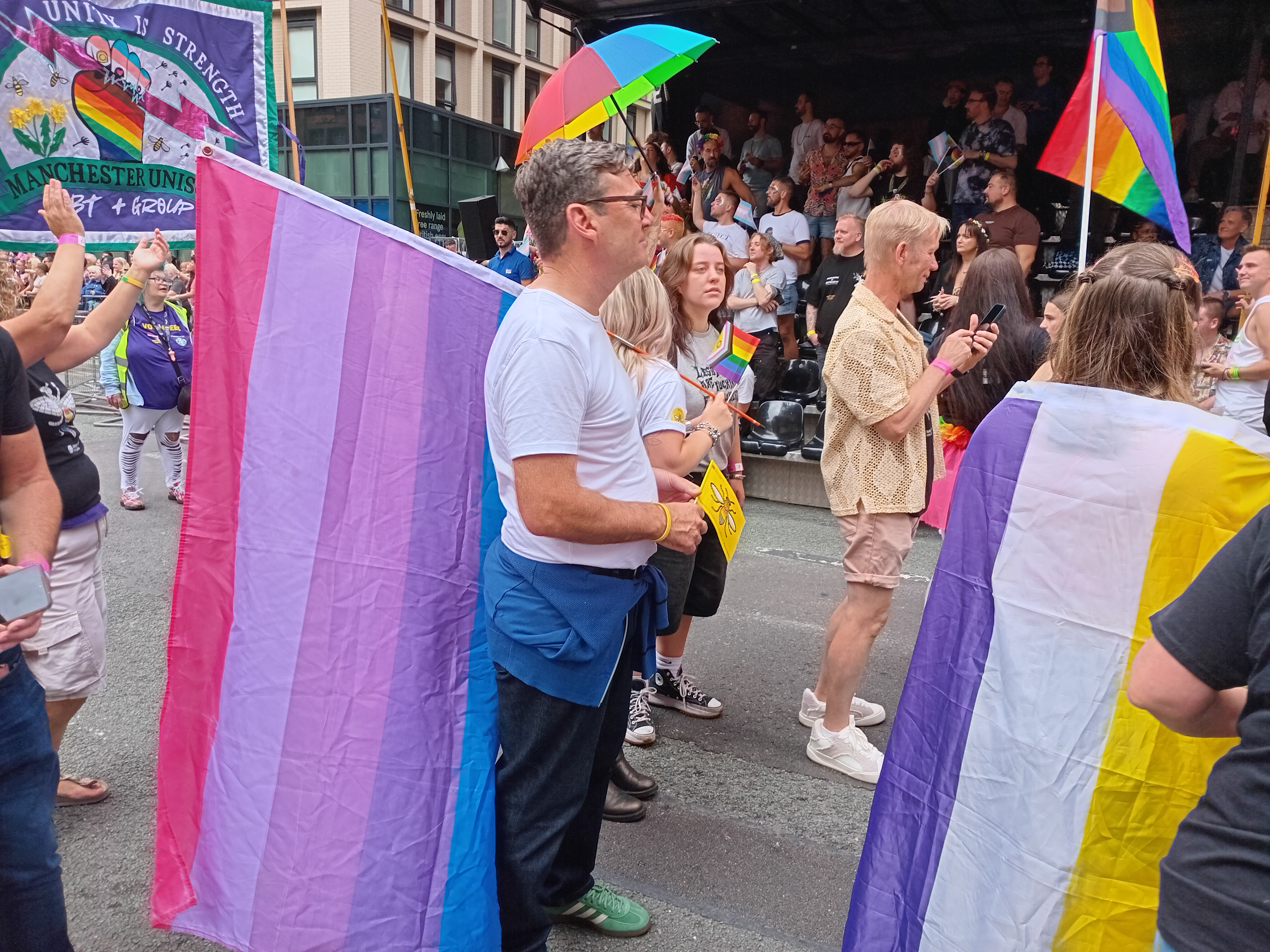
Burnham attending Manchester Pride in 2025

Burnham supported the use of all-women shortlists for parliamentary candidate selections. In an interview in The Daily Telegraph in October 2007, Burnham said: "I think it's better when children are in a home where their parents are married" and "it's not wrong that the tax system should recognise commitment and marriage".

Burnham voted in favour of same-sex marriage in 2013. In 2026, Attitude magazine wrote that he had overall "one of the most consistently pro-LGBTQ+ records in politics."

Burnham was criticised in 2015 for jokingly saying that Labour should have a woman leader "when the time is right", with the New Statesman saying that he had "tripped over his mouth again". He abstained on the government's welfare bill, despite having previously described the legislation as "unsupportable".

In February 2020, Burnham met with the UK advocacy organisation LGB Alliance, which has faced criticism over its positions on transgender rights to discuss a letter he had written to the government concerning changes to the Gender Recognition Act 2004. When concerns were raised over it being an anti-transgender organisation, he replied that there "was no mention in the letter of the LGB Alliance" before the meeting, and his representatives replied that he had "made his support for the trans community very clear over the years". In May 2026, Burnham said that people need to "stop arguing" about transgender rights, and have a "live and let live" approach, while simultaneously retracting his prior support for trans people being allowed to use single-sex facilities, instead voicing support for the regulations enacted by the Equality and Human Rights Commission after the court case For Women Scotland Ltd v The Scottish Ministers.

=== Constitutional and electoral reform ===
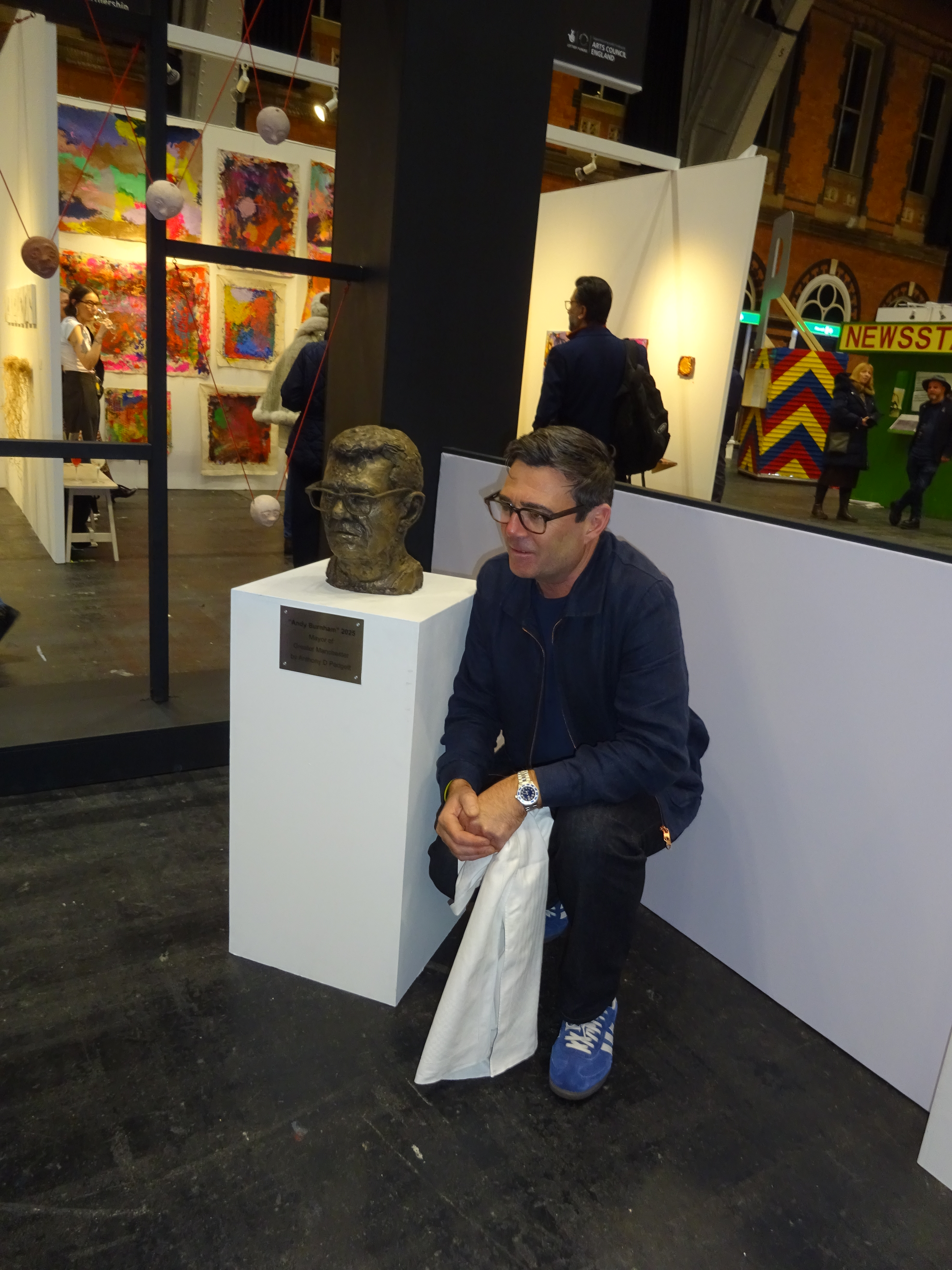
Burnham unveils a sculpture of himself at Manchester Art Fair 2025

Burnham is a supporter of replacing the House of Lords with an elected Senate of the nations and regions and for switching elections to the House of Commons to a form of proportional representation. He has also spoken in favour of the non-proportional alternative vote and advocated reform of the whipping system to make it easier for MPs to vote in their constituency's interests. In a May 2026 interview, as part of his campaign for the 2026 Makerfield by-election, Burnham said that he would require electoral reform "to be in a manifesto and endorsed at a general election", rejecting the idea of introducing proportional representation in the current parliament.

=== Head North ===
In 2024, Burnham co-authored Head North: A Rallying Cry for a More Equal Britain with the Liverpool City Region Mayor Steve Rotheram. The book was described by Benjamin Myers for The Observer as "offering hope to the northern regions when it is most needed, and reminding us that those politicians who refuse to toe the party line are often those who history remembers most favourably." In contrast, it was described by Jonathan Ball in the New Statesman as simplifying the North–South divide in England to "'London elite' vs 'neglected north' caricatures".

== Personal life ==
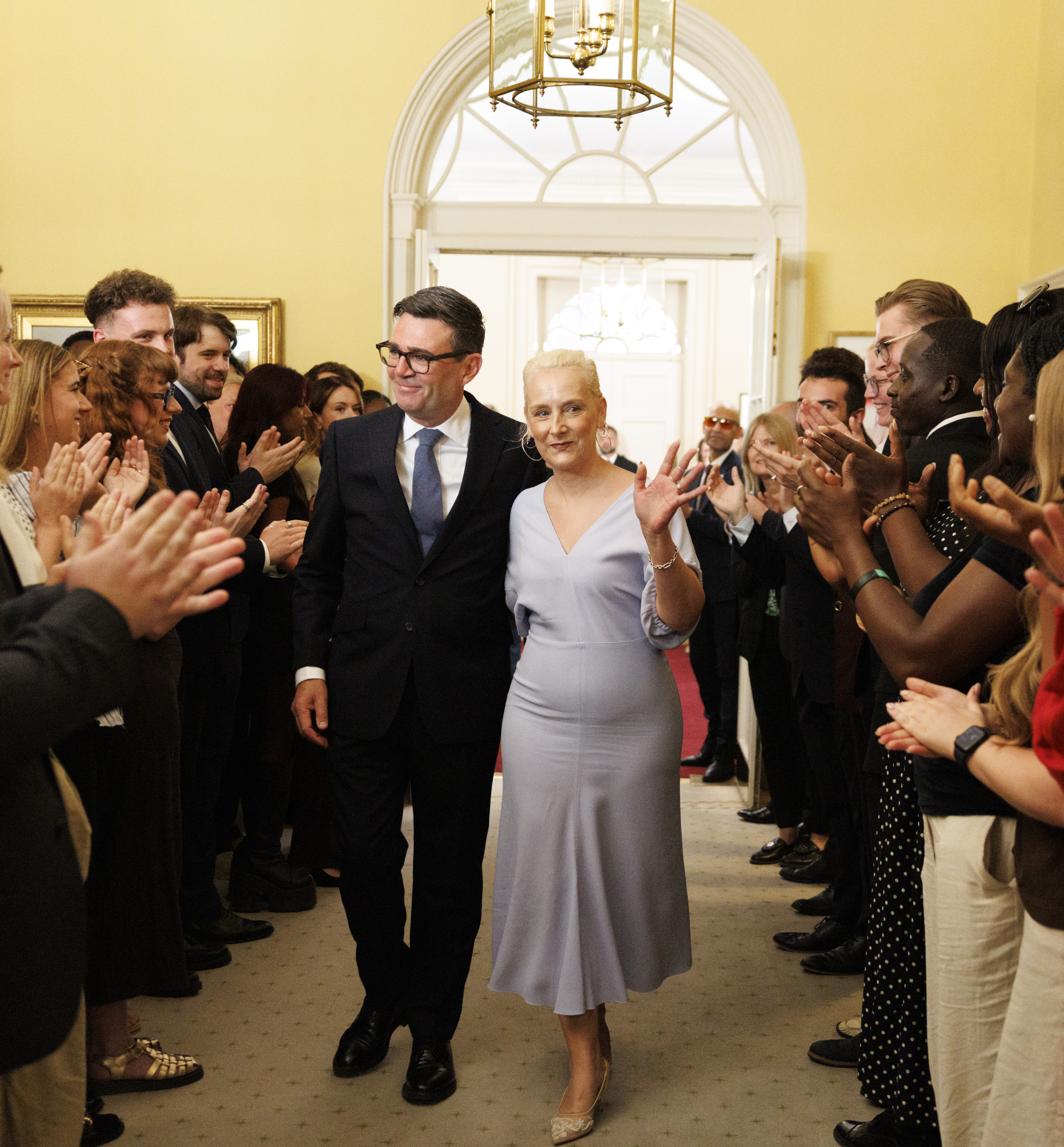
Burnham and his wife Marie-France van Heel inside 10 Downing Street, 20 July 2026

Burnham married American-born Marie-France van Heel, who is of Dutch descent, in October 2000; they have been in a relationship since their university days. The couple have a son and two daughters. The family reside in Golborne, Greater Manchester. Burnham has two brothers, both teachers; Nick is the principal of Cardinal Newman College, a Catholic Sixth Form College in Preston, and John is headteacher of Ormskirk School.

Burnham was brought up Catholic. In the 2015 leadership contest, he praised Pope Francis but urged him to promote a progressive stance on gay rights. In a newspaper interview during the contest, he said that he had been repeatedly at odds with the Catholic Church while he was an MP, and that this had strained personal relationships.

Burnham has stated that his primary national identity is a British identity rather than English, which he has attributed to his Irish heritage. He has said that he sees himself as British first, a north-westerner second, Scouse third, and English fourth.

He has a tattoo of a bee on his right arm in reference to the Manchester worker bee.

Burnham is a fan of indie music, having become interested in the Manchester indie music scene during his youth. He has played a number of DJ sets to raise money for charity. Burnham is a supporter of rugby league, having previously served as the honorary chairman of Leigh Centurions for a short time, and is now an honorary vice-president. He was also president of the Rugby Football League from July 2018 until the summer of 2019. Burnham was a talented junior cricketer (playing for Lancashire CCC Juniors) and a keen footballer, and competed at both sports for his college.

Burnham is a lifelong fan of Premier League football club Everton and held a season ticket at the club's Hill Dickinson Stadium, until he was forced to move to the director's box for safety reasons. In July 2003, Burnham played for Conference club Leigh RMI in a pre-season friendly against Everton. He came on as an 88th-minute substitute for Neil Robinson in the 1–1 draw at Hilton Park. He has also played for Labour's "Demon Eyes F.C." football team, and the Bristol City London Supporters' team. Burnham is a keen runner, and he has participated in the London and Boston marathons and the Great Manchester Run 10K.

In March 2023, Burnham was ordered to pay £1,984 and given six penalty points after admitting to driving at 78 mph (126 km/h) on a motorway where there was a temporarily reduced 40 mph (64 km/h) speed limit, though he claimed he was "not aware of any variable speed limit in place on the smart motorway at the time".

On 14 September 2026, Burnham's father, Roy, died from complications of Alzheimer's disease; he was 85. Burnham's office immediately cancelled his public engagements for the two days that followed, including a planned speech to the TUC annual conference in Brighton.

== In media ==
Burnham was portrayed by Matthew McNulty in Anne (2022), an ITV miniseries about the Hillsborough disaster.

In the inaugural season of Saturday Night Live UK, Burnham was portrayed by Paddy Young and by George Fouracres in the second season.

On Dead Ringers, Burnham is voiced by the impressionist Jon Culshaw.

== See also ==
- List of prime ministers of the United Kingdom
- List of current heads of state and government
- List of heads of the executive by approval rating

Parliament of the United Kingdom
Preceded by Lawrence Cunliffe	Member of Parliament for Leigh; 2001–2017	Succeeded by Jo Platt
Preceded by Josh Simons	Member of Parliament for Makerfield; 2026–present	Incumbent
Government offices
Preceded by Stephen Timms	Chief Secretary to the Treasury; 2007–2008	Succeeded by Yvette Cooper
Preceded by James Purnell	Secretary of State for Culture, Media and Sport; 2008–2009	Succeeded by Ben Bradshaw
Preceded by Alan Johnson	Secretary of State for Health; 2009–2010	Succeeded by Andrew Lansley
Preceded by Keir Starmer	Prime Minister of the United Kingdom; 2026–present	Incumbent
Preceded by Keir Starmer	Minister for the Civil Service; 2026–present	Incumbent
Preceded by Keir Starmer	First Lord of the Treasury; 2026–present	Incumbent
Political offices
Preceded by Andrew Lansley	Shadow Secretary of State for Health; 2010	Succeeded by John Healey
Preceded by Ed Balls	Shadow Secretary of State for Education; 2010–2011	Succeeded by Stephen Twigg
Preceded by John Healey	Shadow Secretary of State for Health; 2011–2015	Succeeded by Heidi Alexander
Preceded by Yvette Cooper	Shadow Home Secretary; 2015–2016	Succeeded by Diane Abbott
Preceded by Tony Lloyd; Interim	Mayor of Greater Manchester; 2017–2026	Succeeded by Bev Craig
Diplomatic posts
Preceded by Donald Trump	Chairperson of the Group of 20; 2027	Succeeded by Lee Jae Myung
Party political offices
Preceded by Keir Starmer	Leader of the Labour Party; 2026–present	Incumbent
Order of precedence in England and Wales
Preceded by Stephen Cottrell as Archbishop of York	Gentlemen as Prime Minister of the United Kingdom	Succeeded by Alan Campbell as Lord President of the Council
Order of precedence in Scotland
Preceded by Gordon Kennedy as Moderator of the General Assembly of the Church of Scotland	Gentlemen as Prime Minister of the United Kingdom	Succeeded by John Swinney as First Minister of Scotland
Order of precedence in Northern Ireland
Preceded by Richard Murray as Moderator of the General Assembly of the Presbyterian Church in Ireland	Gentlemen as Prime Minister of the United Kingdom	Succeeded by Commonwealth Prime Ministers
