= Mansion tax =

Type of annual property tax

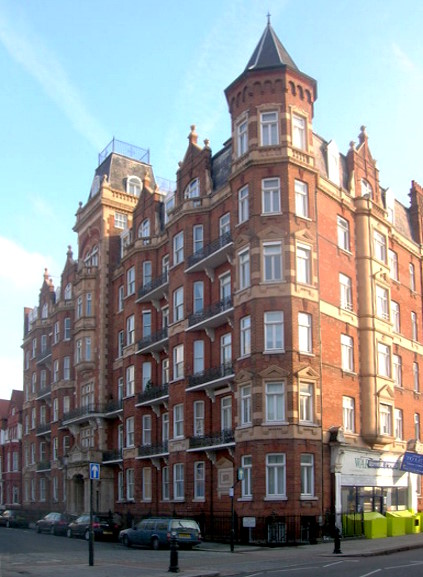
Flats at Langham Mansions in Warwick Road, London SW5. Some expensive London properties may be flats in larger blocks.

A mansion tax is a common name for an annual property tax on high value homes, although the term itself is widely regarded as a misnomer.

Until the Budget of Autumn 2025, the tax was only a proposal in the United Kingdom, but will now come into effect in April 2028 on properties worth over £2 million.

Many US states levy a surcharge on the highest-value homes or have a progressive taxation in their real estate transfer tax system, sometimes referred to as “mansion taxes.”

== United Kingdom ==
=== Original concept ===
In the United Kingdom, the concept of a mansion tax is widely attributed to Vince Cable. In its original form, proposed in 2009, Cable suggested that all properties valued at over £1 million would be taxed annually. He raised the proposed threshold to £2 million in January 2012.

=== Budget 2012 ===
In an accommodation with Coalition partners, the proposal was modified and a 7% rate of Stamp Duty Land Tax was levied on house sales over £2 million, following George Osborne's 2012 budget. In contrast to an annual "mansion tax", this one-off tax is only paid when a property is bought.

=== Liberal Democrat conference motion 2012 ===
Support for the original proposal re-emerged at the Liberal Democrat 2012 conference.

The motion called for "an annual mansion tax on the excess value of residential properties over £2 million as a first step towards wealth taxation designed to reduce inequality". It was passed in a vote of over 200 delegates, with two against.

Despite this, the Liberal Democrat's coalition government partner, the Conservatives, ruled out the introduction of a Mansion Tax; Chancellor of the Exchequer George Osborne said in October 2012: "We are not going to have a mansion tax, or a new tax that is a percentage value of people’s properties. Before the election they will call it a mansion tax, but people will wake up the day after the election and discover suddenly their more modest home has been labelled a mansion."

=== Labour Party embrace concept ===
On 14 February 2013, the Labour Party leader Ed Miliband said that he would, if in government, introduce a mansion tax and then re-introduce a ten pence tax rate for low earners. However, there was no commitment to put this policy into the Labour Party manifesto and there was also criticism of the fairness and practicality of the proposal. Miliband reiterated this policy proposal at the 2014 Labour Party Conference and it became a firm commitment. Labour claimed the policy would raise £1.2 billion a year which would be used to fund the National Health Service. Based on an estimated 100,000 homes valued over £2 million, this means each property would be liable for an average bill of £12,000.

On 20 October 2014 in response to widespread publicity about the proposal, the Shadow chancellor Ed Balls published further details. He confirmed properties valued between £2 million and £3 million would pay £3,000 per annum, but properties over £3 million would pay considerably more. Commentators have suggested that in order to raise the projected £1.2 billion, the mansion tax payable on homes over £3 million would have to be £28,000.

=== Labour review policy after 2015 election defeat ===
After Labour's May 2015 election defeat, Labour leadership candidates began to distance themselves from the policy. Andy Burnham said the mansion tax had been too "symbolic" and played into a public dislike of the "politics of envy". Mary Creagh, another candidate for the leadership, said: "It alienated a whole bunch of people who said we were against them getting on and doing well".

=== Liberal Democrat Party moves away from a mansion tax ===
In October 2014, the Liberal Democrats abandoned plans for a new tax on high-value homes, opting instead for a change in the existing Council Tax system. Nick Clegg, speaking on the BBC during the Liberal Democrat Party Conference 2014, said: "I went off, big time, the idea that you have a fixed levy as a percentage over a certain value. The more I looked at it, the more I thought, 'That’s very crude.' It leads to eye-watering amounts of tax being paid. What we should do is go with the grain of the council tax system and apply bands to higher properties."

=== Autumn Statement 2014 ===
On 3 December 2014 George Osborne announced changes to stamp duty. These measures included large increases in tax for more expensive houses. A buyer of a house at £2 million would now have to pay £153,750 in stamp duty. In his speech he alluded to this being his alternative to Labour's mansion tax.

=== Budget 2025 ===
Rachel Reeves announced the High Value Council Tax Surcharge, a new charge on owners, rather than occupiers, of residential property in England. The following annual charges would apply from April 2028:

Properties valued from £2m to £2.5m will pay £2,500

Properties valued from £2.5m to £3.5m will pay £3,500

Properties valued from £3.5m to £5m will pay £5,000

Properties valued at more than £5m will pay £7,500

=== Criticism ===
Critics have said such a policy would hurt pensioners, as according to analysis by the think-tank the Centre for Policy Studies, almost one third of all properties worth over £2 million have been in the same ownership for over ten years.

The phrase "mansion tax" has been described as a misnomer as 10% of properties in London valued at £2m-plus are one- or two-bedroom flats.

== United States ==
In 2022 voters in Los Angeles enacted a 4% tax on property sales above $5 million and 5.5% on sales above $10 million. As of May 2026, the tax has raised $1.2 billion over three years, substantially less than the city's projections of $0.6 to 1.1 billion annually. The tax has also been blamed for causing construction of multi-unit housing (apartment buildings) to plummet, since the tax is applied to commercial properties as well as single-family homes, with 39% of the revenue from the tax coming from properties other than individual homes.

Additionally, a Harvard Business School study estimated that 80% of the money raised via this tax will be lost from property taxes because of reduced property sales. (Because of Proposition 13 in California, property tax is held at 1979 valuations plus a maximum 2% increase per year, unless the property is sold, at which point the valuation resets to the sale price.)

== See also ==
- Council Tax
- Land value tax
