= Intern Aware =

- Intern Aware
- Founded: 2010; 16 years ago
- Location: England
- Key people: Gus Baker (Co-Director), Ben Lyons (Co-Director), and Chris Hares (National Campaigns Manager)
- Website: www.internaware.org

Intern Aware is the United Kingdom national campaign for fair internships, founded in 2010. Working closely in cooperation with businesses, trade bodies and trade unions, they aim to help employers develop high quality internship schemes with recruitment based on merit, and payment that complies with employment law. They also work with interns to ensure they receive the pay they are potentially entitled to by law.

They believe that unpaid internships are exploitative, exclusive and unfair. By asking people to work without pay, employers exclude those with talent, ambition and drive who cannot afford to work for free. They campaign that employers and young people alike benefit from the best graduates getting the best jobs. They argue that paying interns a fair wage can ensure that this happens.

== Policies ==
Much of Intern Aware’s argument focuses on how interns fit into the National Minimum Wage Act 1998.

Main proposal

• (Excluding existing exemptions) the UK Government should designate anyone who has undertaken a period of work experience for over four weeks to be a “worker” under the meaning of the National Minimum Wage (NMW) Act.

Other proposals

- “Naming and shaming” of persistent, high profile offenders who break the NMW Act;
- Third parties should be able to complain about non-enforcement of the NMW;
- Advertisements for illegal work should be monitored;
- Better support and guidance to vulnerable workers;
- Raise penalties for non-payment of the NMW
- A new paid internship scheme for the third sector.

== History ==
The organisation started as a Facebook group named "Interns Must Be Paid The Minimum Wage". It has led campaigns focused on the non-payment of parliamentary interns. It also campaigned during the Labour Party's leadership election, securing the support of all five candidates and persuading Andy Burnham MP to demand that the BBC end unpaid work experience. The campaign has also drawn attention to the connection between increased graduate unemployment and unpaid interns.
