= United Nations Security Council Resolution 1272 =

UN Security Council Resolution 1272
- Flag of East Timor
- Date: 25 October 1999
- Meeting no.: 4,057
- Code: S/RES/1272 (Document)
- Subject: The situation in Timor
- Voting summary: 15 voted for; None voted against; None abstained
- Result: Adopted

Security Council composition
- Permanent members: China; France; Russia; United Kingdom; United States
- Non-permanent members: Argentina; Bahrain; Brazil; Canada; Gabon; Gambia; Malaysia; Namibia; Netherlands; Slovenia

United Nations Security Council resolution 1272 was adopted unanimously on 25 October 1999, after recalling previous resolutions on East Timor (Timor Leste), particularly resolutions 384 (1975), 389 (1976), 1236 (1999), 1246 (1999), 1262 (1999) and 1264 (1999). The council established the United Nations Transitional Administration in East Timor (UNTAET) that was responsible for the administration of the territory until its independence in 2002.

== Resolution ==
=== Observations ===
The security council noted the decision of the East Timorese people in the Special Autonomy Referendum to begin a process of transition under United Nations administration towards independence. The International Force for East Timor (INTERFET) was now deployed and continued co-operation was needed between the Indonesian government and INTERFET. Meanwhile, the council was concerned at the deteriorating humanitarian situation as a result of violence in East Timor which had caused large-scale displacement of civilians and widespread violations of international humanitarian and human rights law.

=== Acts ===
Acting under Chapter VII of the United Nations Charter, the Council authorised the establishment of UNTAET which would have full responsibility for the administration of East Timor and control of the executive, legislative and the administration of justice. UNTAET would also maintain law and order, assist in the development of the civil services, facilitate the delivery of humanitarian assistance, support capacity-building and establish an effective administration and conditions for sustainable development. The main components of UNTAET would consist of:

(a) a governance and public administration component including 1,640 police;
(b) a humanitarian component;
(c) a military component with 8,950 troops and 200 military observers.

Additionally, UNTAET was authorised to take all necessary measures to fulfill its mandate. The Secretary-General Kofi Annan was to appoint a Special Representative to head the operation and who would have the power to make new laws and suspend or repeal existing ones.

The Council stressed the need for co-operation between UNTAET, INTERFET and the local population with a view to the establishment of an independent human rights institution among others. INTERFET would also be replaced by the military component of UNTAET. There was a need for humanitarian and reconstruction assistance, including the issue of refugees and displaced persons resettling in either West Timor or East Timor, and acts of violence were condemned. The Secretary-General was to establish a Trust Fund to finance international assistance, and was requested to provide regular updates on all aspects of the situation in East Timor.

== See also ==
- 1999 East Timorese crisis
- Indonesian occupation of East Timor
- List of United Nations Security Council Resolutions 1201 to 1300 (1998–2000)
- United Nations Mission in East Timor
- List of territories administered by the United Nations
