= Ian Martin (UN official) =

English human rights advisor (born 1946)

- Martin in 2019

Secretary-General of Amnesty International
- In office 1 October 1986 – October 1992
- Preceded by: Thomas Hammarberg
- Succeeded by: Pierre Sané

Special Representative of the Secretary-General and Head of the United Nations Support Mission in Libya
- In office 11 September 2011 – 17 October 2012
- Succeeded by: Tarek Mitri

Executive Director of Security Council Report
- In office 2015–2018

Chair of the Board of Trustees of United Nations Association – UK
- Incumbent
- Assumed office December 2024

Personal details
- Born: Ian Martin; August 10, 1946 (age 80)
- Party: Labour
- Education: Emmanuel College, Cambridge; Harvard University
- Occupation: Human rights activist, adviser
- Known for: Secretary-General of Amnesty International; United Nations official
- Awards: Order of Timor-Leste; honorary doctorate from the University of Essex

Ian Martin (born 10 August 1946) is an English human rights activist/advisor, former Secretary General of Amnesty International, and sometime United Nations official. His most recent major UN assignment was as the Special Representative of the Secretary-General and Head of the United Nations Support Mission in Libya. From 2015 to 2018 he was Executive Director of Security Council Report. Since December 2024, he has been Chair of the Board of Trustees of the United Nations Association – UK.

== Early life ==
Martin was educated at Brentwood School in Brentwood, Essex, and graduated from Emmanuel College, Cambridge, with first class honours in history and economics. Afterwards, he was a graduate student in development economics at Harvard University for a year.

From 1969 to 1972, Martin worked for the Ford Foundation in India, Pakistan, and Bangladesh. In 1971 while in Dhaka, East Pakistan, he witnessed the beginning of Bangladesh's War of Independence.

After returning to the United Kingdom, Martin worked with the Redbridge Community Relations Council in London then served five years as the General Secretary of the Joint Council for the Welfare of Immigrants followed by three years as the General Secretary of the Fabian Society. He was a Labour Party Councillor in the London Borough of Redbridge from 1978 to 1982.

== Amnesty International ==
Martin's earlier work on the Indian subcontinent led to him become Head of the Asia Region in the Research Department of Amnesty International in 1985. On 1 October 1986, he became Secretary-General of Amnesty International, a post he held until October 1992. The number of members, supporters, and subscribers to the organization nearly doubled in size during Martin's tenure as secretary-general. Martin headed Amnesty International missions to Israel and the Occupied Territories, Uganda, Bahrain, Kuwait, Republic of Korea, Argentina, Austria, Egypt, Bangladesh, Cuba, Philippines, Hungary, Mozambique, USSR, Syria, Pakistan, Sudan, Jordan, Yemen, Colombia, Peru, Bhutan, Kazakhstan, Kyrgyzstan, Uzbekistan, Tunisia and India. The Human Rights Now! and A Conspiracy of Hope concert tours took place during Martin's leadership.

Martin's resignation as Secretary-General of Amnesty International was discussed in Stephen Hopgood's 2006 book Keepers of the Flame: Understanding Amnesty International. According to Hopgood, Martin's decision was partially due to conflict with the chairman of Amnesty's International Executive Committee, Peter Duffy. After leaving AI, he became a senior associate at the Carnegie Endowment for International Peace.

== United Nations ==
Martin has held a number of senior positions with the United Nations and other international organizations. While working at the Carnegie Endowment for International Peace, he was asked to serve as Director of Human Rights and Deputy Executive Director of the UN/OAS International Civilian Mission in Haiti. After leaving Haiti, Martin was named Chief of United Nations Human Rights Field Operation in Rwanda from 1995 to 1996. Martin was appointed Special Adviser on Human Rights Field Operations to the High Commissioner on Human Rights in 1998.

=== East Timor ===
During the United Nations Mission in East Timor that garnered worldwide attention in 1999, Martin served as Special Representative of the UN Secretary-General for the East Timor Popular Consultation. In 2006, he served as Special Envoy of the Secretary-General for Timor-Leste. In 2001, his book "Self-Determination in East Timor: The United Nations, the Ballot and International Intervention" was published by Lynne Rienner Publishers.

For his work in East Timor, Martin was awarded the Ordem de Timor-Leste, Medalha, and made Comendador da Ordem da Liberdade, Portugal.

=== Eritrea ===
From 2000 to 2001 he was appointed Deputy Special Representative of the UN Secretary-General in the United Nations Mission in Ethiopia and Eritrea, based in Asmara.

=== Nepal ===
From 2005 to 2006, Martin led the Office of the United Nations High Commissioner for Human Rights in Nepal. In October 2005, the government of King Gyanendra put in place a restrictive media ordinance which resulted in Martin's office releasing a statement decrying it as "violat[ing] international human rights standards". Martin subsequently became Personal Representative of the Secretary-General in Nepal for support to the peace process, 2006–2007, and Special Representative of the Secretary-General and Head of United Nations Mission in Nepal, 2006–2009.

=== Gaza investigation and WikiLeaks ===
In 2009, Martin was appointed to head an independent United Nations Headquarters Board of Inquiry by Secretary-General of the United Nations Ban Ki-moon in order to investigate nine separate incidents during the 2008–2009 Gaza War involving deaths, injuries or damage at U.N. facilities. The Board's report, a summary of which was released on 5 May 2009, concluded that seven separate incidents were the result of firing by the Israeli Defence Forces, but found no evidence that U.N. facilities had been used to launch attacks against the IDF.

The Board also recommended that the U.N. further investigate violations of international humanitarian law by those on both sides of the conflict: Israeli forces, Hamas, and other Palestinian militants. In April 2011, WikiLeaks released documents indicating that United States Ambassador to the United Nations Susan Rice contacted Ban on 4 May 2009 and successfully pressured him into rejecting Martin's recommendation for the far-reaching investigation. The United Nations Human Rights Council had by then redefined the scope of the investigation it had mandated and established the United Nations Fact Finding Mission on the Gaza Conflict headed by Richard Goldstone.

=== Libya ===
Martin was named Special Adviser to the Secretary-General on Post-Conflict Planning for Libya in April 2011 and was responsible for coordinating various agencies, funds, and programmes of the United Nations as well as consulting with the World Bank. During this work in Libya, he visited Benghazi and consulted the National Transitional Council.

Martin was the Special Representative of the Secretary-General and Head of the United Nations Support Mission in Libya from 11 September 2011 until 17 October 2012 when he was succeeded by Tarek Mitri. With Georg Charpentier as his Deputy, he led a staff of 200 tasked to assist with a range of duties including electoral assistance and police training. On 10 May 2012 Martin told the United Nations Security Council that there were credible reports of loyalists to toppled leader Muammar Gaddafi being mistreated and even tortured to death in detention centres under the transitional government's control. In April 2012, unidentified individuals threw a bomb at his convoy as it was travelling through Benghazi. No one was wounded. On 8 August 2012 Martin was present in Tripoli as the National Transitional Council handed over power to the General National Congress.

In 2022, his book, All Necessary Measures? The United Nations and International Intervention in Libya, was published by Hurst.

== Other United Nations assignments ==
Martin was a member of the High-Level Independent Panel on Peace Operations appointed by Secretary-General Ban Ki-moon, which reported in 2015.

In 2025, Martin undertook a strategic assessment of the United Nations Relief and Works Agency for Palestine Refugees in the Near East.

== Other international appointments ==
=== Bosnia and Herzegovina ===
From 1998 to 1999, Martin served as Deputy High Representative for Human Rights in the Office of the High Representative for Bosnia and Herzegovina.

=== Sri Lanka ===
During the Sri Lankan Civil War, Martin was appointed by the Sri Lankan government and the Liberation Tigers of Tamil Eelam as human rights adviser to the peace process and involved in peace talks. Talks were suspended in 2003 before the two parties approved an agreement on human rights drafted by Martin.

== Other ==
In 2003, he was given an honorary doctorate by the University of Essex.

Martin was also Vice President of the International Center for Transitional Justice from 2002 to 2005, and Executive Director of Security Council Report from 2015 to 2018. He has lectured on human rights at universities including Harvard Law School and his writings include Self-Determination in East Timor: the United Nations, the Ballot, and International Intervention and All Necessary Measures? The United Nations and International Intervention in Libya.

== Views ==
Martin has supported the International Commission of Jurists's conclusion that war crimes and acts of genocide had been committed by the Pakistan Army and its collaborators during the Bangladesh Liberation War. In supporting a trial for war crimes by the International Crimes Tribunal, he has voiced the opinion that the process must be free of political pressures.

Martin is opposed to the death penalty and has campaigned against its use worldwide.

Party political offices
Preceded by Dianne Hayter	General Secretary of the Fabian Society; 1982 – 1985	Succeeded by John Willman
Non-profit organization positions
Preceded by Thomas Hammarberg	Secretary-General of Amnesty International; 1986–1992	Succeeded by Pierre Sané
