= United Nations Security Council Resolution 1262 =

UN Security Council Resolution 1262
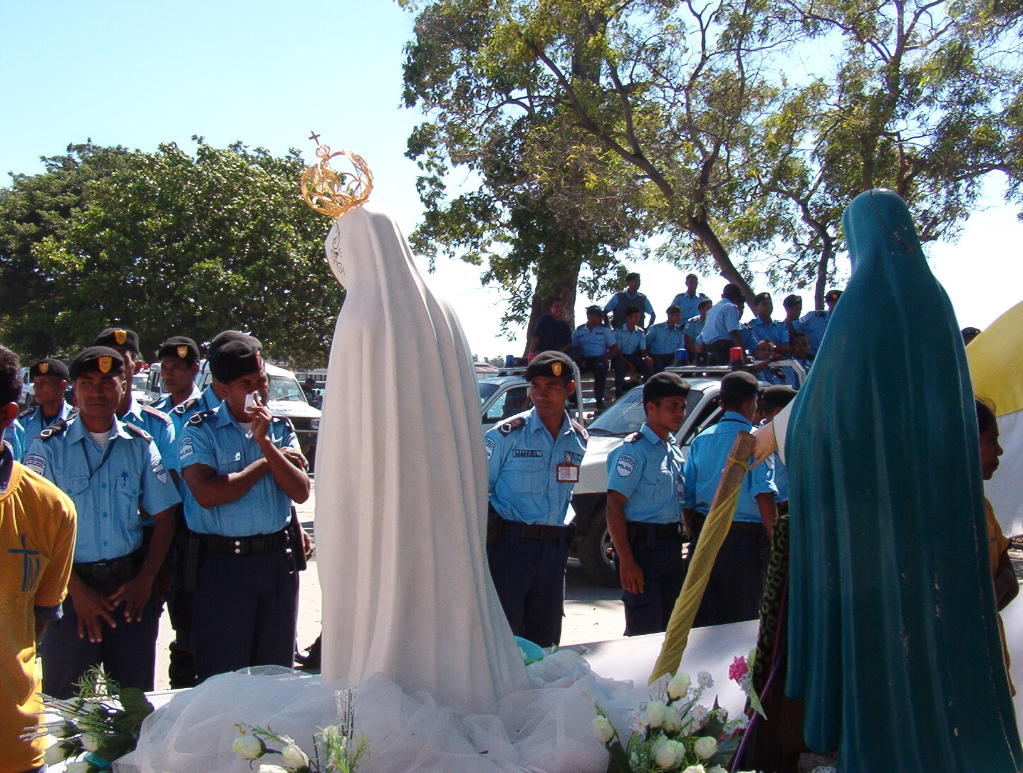
- East Timorese police
- Date: 27 August 1999
- Meeting no.: 4,038
- Code: S/RES/1262 (Document)
- Subject: The situation in Timor
- Voting summary: 15 voted for; None voted against; None abstained
- Result: Adopted

Security Council composition
- Permanent members: China; France; Russia; United Kingdom; United States
- Non-permanent members: Argentina; Bahrain; Brazil; Canada; Gabon; Gambia; Malaysia; Namibia; Netherlands; Slovenia

United Nations Security Council resolution 1262, adopted unanimously on 27 August 1999, after recalling previous resolutions on East Timor (Timor Leste), particularly resolutions 1246 (1999) and 1257 (1999), the Council extended the mandate of the United Nations Mission in East Timor (UNAMET) until 30 November 1999.

The Security Council recalled the agreement signed between Indonesia and Portugal on the future of East Timor and the agreements between the United Nations and Indonesia and Portugal concerning the East Timor Special Autonomy Referendum both signed on 5 May 1999. It noted the need for the United Nations to pursue its efforts in East Timor following the referendum to build confidence and stability. The Secretary-General Kofi Annan had suggested that UNAMET temporarily continue its operation in the period after the referendum and the implementation of its result.

After extending UNAMET's mandate until 30 November 1999, the Council endorsed the Secretary-General's proposals concerning the interim phase of UNAMET with the following components:

(a) an electoral unit;
(b) a police component of up to 460 personnel to advise the Indonesian National Police and training of the new National Police of East Timor;
(c) a military liaison component of up to 300 personnel to maintain relations;
(d) a civilian component to advise the Special Representative of the Secretary-General on the implementation of the agreements;
(e) a public information component to disseminate information on the implementation progress and promote reconciliation.

All parties were called upon to co-operate with UNAMET and guarantee its freedom of movement, while Indonesia was responsible for continuing to provide security in East Timor in the interim period.

== See also ==
- 1999 East Timorese crisis
- Indonesian occupation of East Timor
- International Force for East Timor
- List of United Nations Security Council Resolutions 1201 to 1300 (1998–2000)
- United Nations Transitional Administration in East Timor
