= United Nations Security Council Resolution 1264 =

UN Security Council Resolution 1264
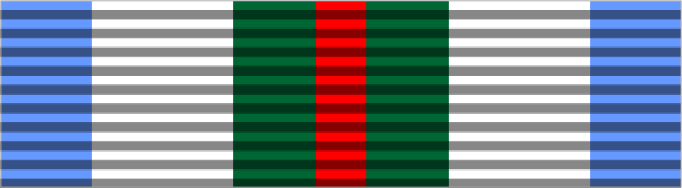
- INTERFET medal
- Date: 15 September 1999
- Meeting no.: 4,045
- Code: S/RES/1264 (Document)
- Subject: The situation in Timor
- Voting summary: 15 voted for; None voted against; None abstained
- Result: Adopted

Security Council composition
- Permanent members: China; France; Russia; United Kingdom; United States
- Non-permanent members: Argentina; Bahrain; Brazil; Canada; Gabon; Gambia; Malaysia; Namibia; Netherlands; Slovenia

United Nations Security Council resolution 1264, adopted unanimously on 15 September 1999, after recalling previous resolutions on East Timor (Timor-Leste), the Council authorised the establishment of the multinational International Force for East Timor (INTERFET) to restore peace and security in the territory, facilitate humanitarian assistance and protect the United Nations Mission in East Timor (UNAMET).

The Security Council welcomed the successful conduct of the 1999 East Timorese independence referendum on 30 August 1999, in which the East Timorese people voted for independence. Meanwhile, there was concern about the deteriorating security situation and the violence that had displaced many residents. Attacks also took place against UNAMET and other international and national humanitarian personnel and this had particularly affected vulnerable groups. There were reports of widespread violations of international humanitarian and human rights law across East Timor, and Indonesia had accepted the presence of a United Nations international peacekeeping force in the region.

Acting under Chapter VII of the United Nations Charter, the Council condemned the violence in East Timor, called for those responsible to be brought to justice and emphasised the need for immediate unrestricted humanitarian assistance to the area. In this regard, it authorised the establishment of an Australian-led multinational force under joint command with the task of restoring peace, protecting the UNAMET mission and assisting in humanitarian operations using all necessary measures. The force consisted of 8,000 personnel from 17 countries. The Government of Indonesia, which had temporary responsibility for the security of East Timor, would co-operate with the multinational force or INTERFET.

The resolution noted that part of the agreement between Indonesia and Portugal on the future of East Timor stipulated a peaceful and orderly transfer of authority in East Timor to the United Nations and INTERFET was asked to support the process. The multinational force would be present in East Timor for four months until replaced by a United Nations peacekeeping force and would be required to submit periodic reports on its progress.

Finally, the Secretary-General was asked to make preparations for a transitional administration in East Timor that would include a peacekeeping operation during the implementation phase following the referendum.

== See also ==
- 1999 East Timorese crisis
- Indonesian occupation of East Timor
- United Nations Security Council Resolution 384
- United Nations Security Council Resolution 1246
- List of United Nations Security Council Resolutions 1201 to 1300 (1998–2000)
- United Nations Transitional Administration in East Timor
