= Tony Lloyd =

British politician (1950–2024)

Sir Tony Lloyd
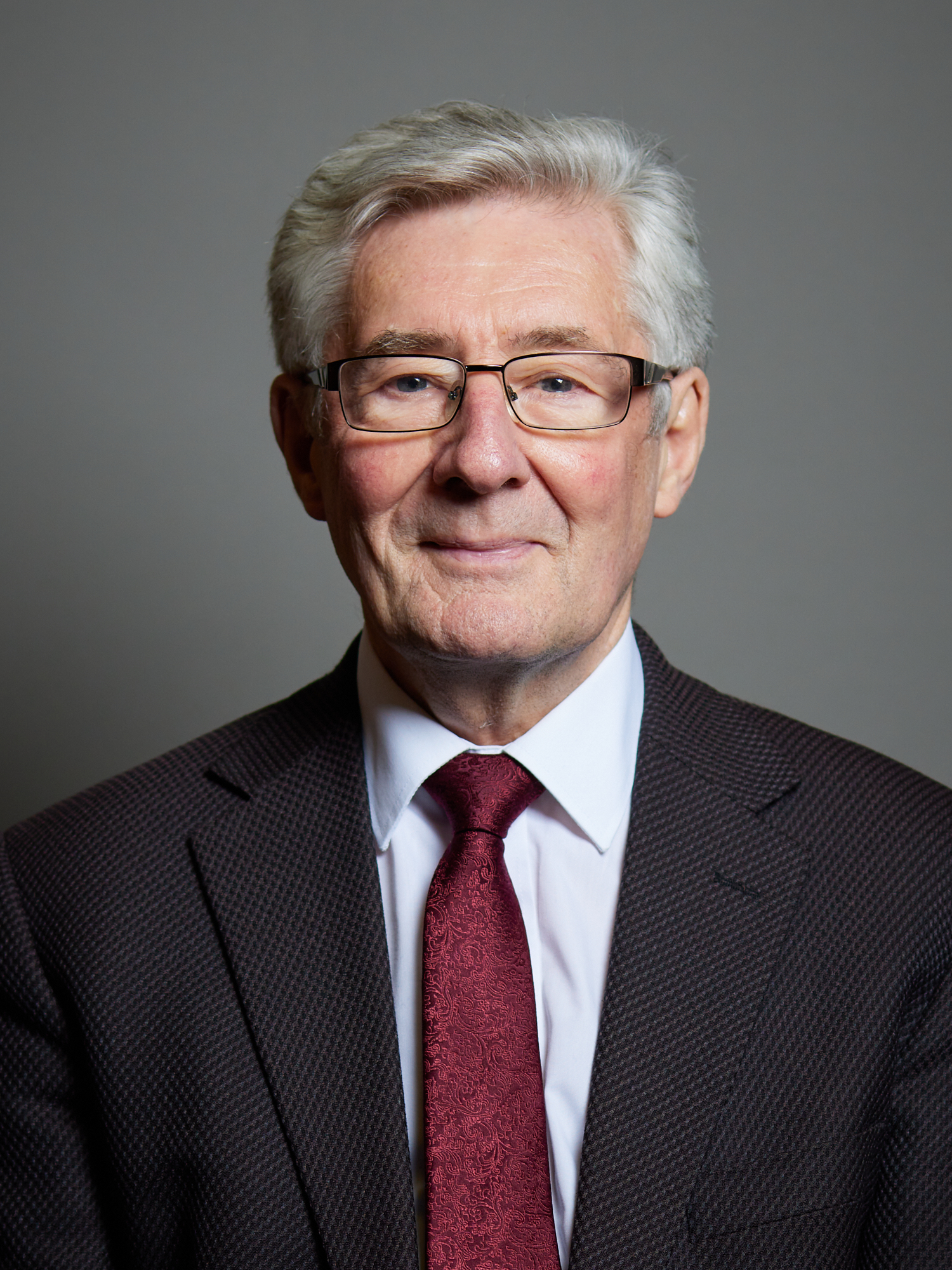
- Official portrait, 2021

Mayor of Greater Manchester
- Interim; 29 May 2015 – 8 May 2017
- Preceded by: Office established
- Succeeded by: Andy Burnham

Police and Crime Commissioner for Greater Manchester
- In office 22 November 2012 – 8 May 2017
- Preceded by: Office established
- Succeeded by: Beverley Hughes (Note: As Deputy Mayor of Greater Manchester for Policing and Crime.)

Minister of State for Foreign Affairs
- In office 5 May 1997 – 28 July 1999
- Prime Minister: Tony Blair
- Preceded by: Nicholas Bonsor
- Succeeded by: John Battle

Member of Parliament
- In office 8 June 2017 – 17 January 2024
- Preceded by: Simon Danczuk
- Succeeded by: George Galloway
- Constituency: Rochdale
- In office 9 June 1983 – 22 October 2012
- Preceded by: Winston Churchill
- Succeeded by: Lucy Powell
- Constituency: Stretford (1983–1997); Manchester Central (1997–2012)

Chair of the Parliamentary Labour Party
- In office 5 December 2006 – 15 March 2012
- Party leader: Tony Blair; Gordon Brown; Harriet Harman (acting); Ed Miliband
- Preceded by: Ann Clwyd
- Succeeded by: David Watts
Shadow cabinet
Shadow Secretary of State for Northern Ireland
In office 23 March 2018 – 28 April 2020 (Note: Lloyd was hospitalised with COVID-19 on 6 April 2020, Louise Haigh assumed his responsibilities on an interim basis. He formally resigned the post on 28 April 2020 to focus on his recovery.)
Leader	Jeremy Corbyn
Preceded by	Owen Smith
Succeeded by	Louise Haigh
Shadow Secretary of State for Scotland
In office 19 December 2019 – 6 April 2020
Leader	Jeremy Corbyn
Preceded by	Lesley Laird
Succeeded by	Ian Murray
Junior shadow portfolios
1986–1987	Whip
1988–1992	Employment
1988–1989	Transport
1992–1994	Education
1994–1995	Environment
1995–1997	Foreign Affairs
2017–2018	Housing

Personal details
- Born: Anthony Joseph Lloyd; 25 February 1950 Stretford, Lancashire, England
- Died: 17 January 2024 (aged 73) Manchester, England
- Party: Labour
- Spouse: Judith Tear (m. 1974)
- Children: 4
- Education: University of Nottingham (BSc); Manchester Business School (DipBA)
- Awards: Knight Bachelor (2021)

Sir Anthony Joseph Lloyd (25 February 1950 – 17 January 2024) was a British Labour politician. He served as a member of Parliament (MP) for 36 years, making him one of the longest-serving MPs in recent history. He served as the MP for Stretford from 1983 to 1997, Manchester Central from 1997 to 2012, and represented Rochdale from 2017 until his death in 2024. He was Greater Manchester Police and Crime Commissioner between 2012 and 2017 and served as the interim Mayor of Greater Manchester in his last two years in the role.

Born in Stretford, Lloyd served as a Trafford councillor from 1979 to 1984. In 1983 he was elected MP for Stretford, representing the constituency until it was abolished in 1997, at which time he was elected for Manchester Central. As an MP, Lloyd was an opposition spokesman between 1987 and 1997, a minister of state in the Foreign and Commonwealth Office between 1997 and 1999, and Chair of the Parliamentary Labour Party from 2006 to 2012.

Lloyd continued as a constituency MP until October 2012, when he stepped down to contest the 2012 police and crime commissioner elections for the Greater Manchester Police area. He was elected and assumed the position in November 2012. Lloyd, appointed interim mayor of Greater Manchester in 2015, announced in 2016 that he would be seeking to become the Labour Party candidate in the Greater Manchester mayoral election, but lost the nomination to Andy Burnham before being elected as MP for Rochdale in 2017.

Lloyd served as Shadow Secretary of State for Northern Ireland between 2018 and 2020, resigning to recover from his illness of COVID-19. He was also Shadow Secretary of State for Scotland between 2019 and 2020. In 2011, the Manchester Evening News listed Lloyd among its 250 Most Influential People in Greater Manchester, describing him as "a major figure on Labour politics in Greater Manchester", and "the most powerful man in Greater Manchester" on his election as police and crime commissioner in 2012. In a directory of MPs produced by The Guardian, Andrew Roth described Lloyd as "well informed, thoughtful and realistic regionalist and internationalist".

== Childhood ==
Lloyd was born in Stretford on 25 February 1950, the fourth of five children of Sydney Lloyd and his wife, Cecily (née Boatte). He was raised in Stretford, and attended Moss Park and Seymour Park Primary Schools before he progressed to Stretford Grammar School for Boys. He excelled in his studies, earning high grades and receiving several academic awards. Beyond the classroom, Lloyd was a choir boy and participated in the 17th Stretford (1st Lostock) Scout group as a Cub and St Bride’s in Old Trafford.

Lloyd grew up in a household deeply engaged in politics and social justice. His family were ardent supporters of Manchester United, but their passion extended far beyond football. His parents were politically active—his father, Sydney, was a dedicated trade unionist, and Lloyd grew up listening to lively family debate about the Government of the day, party politics and trade union activity. His paternal uncle, Willy, lost his life in the Gallipoli Campaign during the First World War.

Lloyd's father died when he was 13, leaving his mother Ciceley, a staunch supporter of the Labour Party, to shape his values. Lloyd's mother and her sister played a role in the historic Kinder Scout mass trespass of 1932, a defining moment in the campaign for public access to the countryside. She also lost friends in the Spanish Civil War. Lloyd said: "My mother had friends who died in the Spanish Civil War. I saw that as a simple battle of good versus evil and in that sense the basic morality of politics was instilled in me. I have always thought if not fighting for what's right and just, then what is politics for?"

== Early life ==
Before embarking on his mathematics studies at the University of Nottingham, Lloyd took a summer job at the Turner Brothers Asbestos factory in Trafford Park. This first-hand experience would later shape his commitment to supporting victims of asbestos exposure, advocating for further research and improved compensation.

After graduation, Lloyd spent time in Leicester, training as a cost accountant for a shoe machinery company. In 1973, he met Judith, whom he married the following year. The couple settled in Stretford, where Lloyd pursued an MBA at Manchester Business School. He went on to become a lecturer in business administration at the University of Salford.

== Political career ==
=== Trafford Council ===
Lloyd’s career in elected public office began in local government, standing for election in Trafford’s Longford ward in 1976 and 1978. Lloyd's breakthrough came when he was first elected to public office when he stood as a Labour Party candidate in the 1979 Trafford Council election, winning a seat on Trafford Metropolitan Borough Council representing the Clifford ward on 4 May 1979 (the day Margaret Thatcher became Prime Minister of the United Kingdom). Lloyd remained a Trafford councillor until 1984, rising to the rank of Deputy Labour Council Leader.

=== House of Commons ===
Lloyd entered the House of Commons as Member of Parliament for Stretford on 9 June 1983, at the 1983 general election. The constituency previously held by Winston Churchill Jr. In his maiden speech, he highlighted the challenges facing his constituency, notably 40% unemployment in Moss Side. He was an opposition whip between 1986 and 1987, and became the opposition spokesman for transport (1987–1992), employment (1992–1994), the environment (1994–1995), and foreign affairs (1995–1997).

Constituency boundaries were reformed for the 1997 general election, and Lloyd was selected for the Manchester Central constituency, where he was returned at each subsequent general election up to and including 2010. Following the 1997 general election which returned Tony Blair as Prime Minister, Lloyd was appointed a junior Minister of State in the Foreign and Commonwealth Office under Robin Cook, beginning on 5 May 1997. In 1998, an inquiry by the Foreign Affairs Select Committee into the supply of arms from Sandline International to Africa during the Sierra Leone Civil War led to accusations that Lloyd had been dishonest and lacked depth over the trade of illicit weaponry. An independent Inquiry later exonerated Lloyd of any wrongdoing. Lloyd's position at the Foreign Office ended in a government reshuffle on 28 July 1999.

Lloyd remained a powerful backbencher, and on 5 December 2006 became Chair of the Parliamentary Labour Party – a post which leads all Labour MPs, both government and backbench MPs – by defeating the incumbent, Ann Clwyd, who was perceived as being too close to Blair. When he unseated Clwyd, the feud between Blair and Gordon Brown was much reported – Lloyd, was described by journalist Michael White as a "Brownite ally", and Labour advisor Jonathan Powell wrote that Lloyd was a key member of Brown's "team of henchmen on the Labour backbenches to oppose Tony [Blair]". Lloyd was a Member of the North West Regional Select Committee from 4 March 2009 to 11 May 2010. After revelations arising from the United Kingdom parliamentary expenses scandal, Lloyd was forced to apologise for over-claiming £2,210 in rent on his flat in London, adding it was "a genuine error". As Chair of the Parliamentary Labour Party, Lloyd wrote to Labour MPs urging them to publish all expenses claims.

Lloyd voted for Bryan Gould and John Prescott respectively in the Labour Party leadership elections of 1992 and 1994. Although the TheyWorkForYou political activities website declares that Lloyd "hardly ever rebels", he voted against Labour's national agenda in key areas while an MP. He joined rebel Labour MPs by voting against government policy regarding the Iraq War, and rebelled against government policy to detain terror suspects for 90 days without trial. He voted against government policy to introduce student tuition fees, and as an "anti-nuclear and anti-war campaigner", voted against the renewal or replacement of the UK Trident programme in 2007.

In 2024, when paying tribute to Lloyd in the House of Commons following his death, Graham Stringer said "Tony was calm, which does not mean he always toed the party line: on Iraq and Trident, for instance, I was pleased to walk through the Lobby with him. He did not agree with the current Labour party policy on the middle east, but again it was done in a calm and thoughtful way. And when the war memorial in Rochdale was desecrated with pro-Palestinian, anti-British Government writing and by people chanting racist, antisemitic slogans, Tony was the first person to call it out."

Lloyd was strongly in favour of and voted for the reform of the House of Lords, the Identity Cards Act 2006, and the expansion of London Heathrow Airport. Lloyd supported the bid for a proposed supercasino for East Manchester, and was furious with the House of Lords and Gordon Brown for axing the scheme, adding it was "grossly unfair and outrageous" and that "those who kicked it into touch deprived a community with one of the highest levels of unemployment the opportunity to access well paid jobs and proper training". He supported the proposed Greater Manchester congestion charge, and campaigned in its favour in the 2008 referendum on the Greater Manchester Transport Innovation Fund, which was "overwhelmingly rejected" by voters.

Lloyd was the leader of the British delegation to the Parliamentary Assembly of the Council of Europe and one of its vice-presidents, a leader of the British delegation to the Western European Union, and leader of the British delegation to the Organization for Security and Co-operation in Europe (OSCE). He was head of the OSCE at a time when it was monitoring the 2010 Belarusian presidential election, which it denounced as fraudulent; Lloyd said the "election failed to give Belarus the new start it needed", adding "the people of Belarus deserved better". Lloyd was Chair of the Trade Union Group of Labour MPs from 2002 to 2012.

Lloyd contributed chapters about John Robert Clynes and George Kelley, Labour members of Parliament for Manchester elected in 1906, to Men Who Made Labour, edited by Alan Haworth and Diane Hayter, and contributed a piece on the future of the Labour Party in the 2011 book What Next for Labour? Ideas for a new generation.

=== Police and Crime Commissioner ===
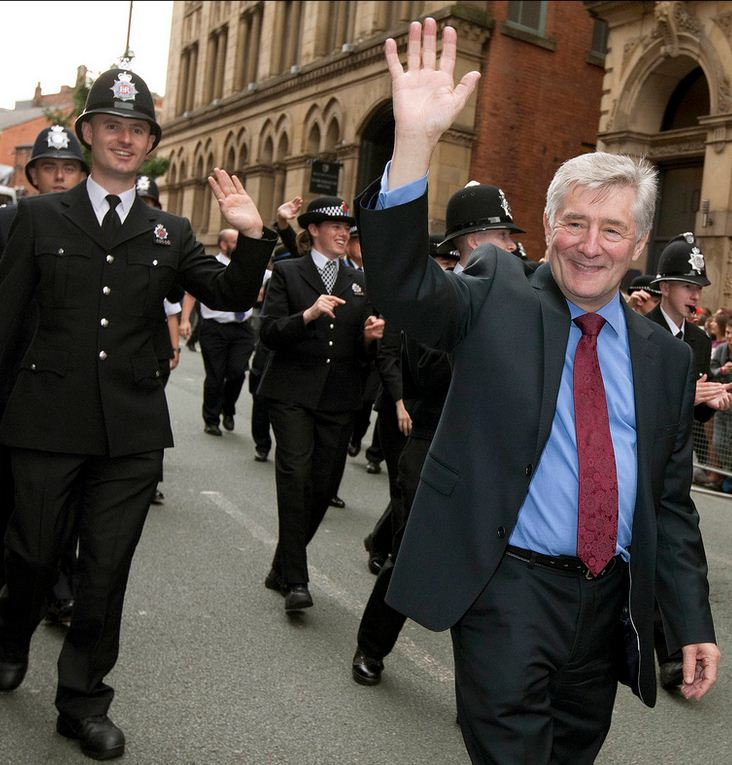
Lloyd parading with the Greater Manchester Police at the 2013 Manchester Pride festival

Lloyd was described by Andrew Roth of The Guardian as a "realistic regionalist"; he supported the creation of the Greater Manchester Combined Authority in 2011, but disagreed that there should be an elected Mayor of Greater Manchester. On 15 February 2012, Lloyd announced his intention to resign as a member of Parliament to stand as a candidate for the directly elected Police and Crime Commissioner for Greater Manchester. Lloyd said he was willing to leave the Manchester Central constituency – a Labour safe seat – for the PCC role because in "all the years I have been a MP, one of the abiding issues that people raised with me was fear of crime". The resulting 2012 Manchester Central by-election was scheduled for the same November polling day. In the 2012 Police and Crime Commissioner elections, Lloyd was elected as the inaugural Greater Manchester Police and Crime Commissioner, winning with 139,437 votes, a share of 51.23% and approximately 7% of the electorate, prompting the Manchester Evening News to quip that he had become "the most powerful man in Greater Manchester".

As Police and Crime Commissioner for Greater Manchester, Lloyd was one of the Labour Party's highest-profile commissioners, overseeing one of the largest police services in England and Wales outside of Greater London. He received £100,000 per year, the largest salary of any English or Welsh Police and Crime Commissioner. He was based at Salford Civic Centre and was required to devise a five-year strategic plan for Greater Manchester Police and hold Sir Peter Fahy, the force's chief constable, to account. On hearing the news that Lloyd had won the election, Fahy said "one of the key roles of the PCC was negotiating and influencing the other local authorities, the health service, businesses and other organisations... We will be expecting him to fight for GMP at a national level with the Home Office over resourcing and changes to legislation". At the end of March 2013, Lloyd published the Police and Crime Plan 2013–2016, setting his nine priorities for policing Greater Manchester. These were:

- Driving down crime
- Building and strengthening partnerships
- Tackling anti-social behaviour
- Protecting vulnerable people
- Putting victims at the centre
- Maintaining public safety, dealing with civil emergencies and emerging threats
- Dealing effectively with terrorism, serious crime and organised criminality
- Building confidence in policing services
- Protecting the police service

The plan outlined Lloyd's vision "for all of us in Greater Manchester to work together to build the safest communities in Britain".

Lloyd was passionate about victims’ rights and services, supporting work at the St Mary’s Sexual Assault Referral Centre and pooling resources to deliver better, more efficient services. This was particularly successful when police were called to attend to those suffering with mental health issues, as police were then able to transfer responsibility to health professionals.

=== Interim Mayor for Greater Manchester ===
Lloyd was appointed interim Mayor for Greater Manchester on 29 May 2015. He subsequently announced that he would be running to become the Labour Party's candidate for the 2017 Greater Manchester mayoral elections on 11 February 2016.

Greg Clark, then Secretary of State for Communities and Local Government, said it was "an absolute pleasure to work closely with Tony during" the two years Lloyd served as interim Mayor. Paying tribute to Lloyd after his death, Clark said "The first Mayor was crucial. Tony was selected by borough leaders across Greater Manchester, and he proved to be the perfect inaugural Mayor with his easy-going charm and ability to work well not only with the three parties who were leading the boroughs of Greater Manchester, but with a Conservative Government. The experience he had of this place and of ministerial office built the confidence in the role of Mayor of Greater Manchester—the confidence that it could be entrusted with powers and responsibilities devolved from this place. That proved to be a template not just for further devolution to Greater Manchester, but for the whole country."

On 9 August, Andy Burnham was selected with 51.1% of the vote. Lloyd came second with 29.1%.

=== Return to the Commons ===
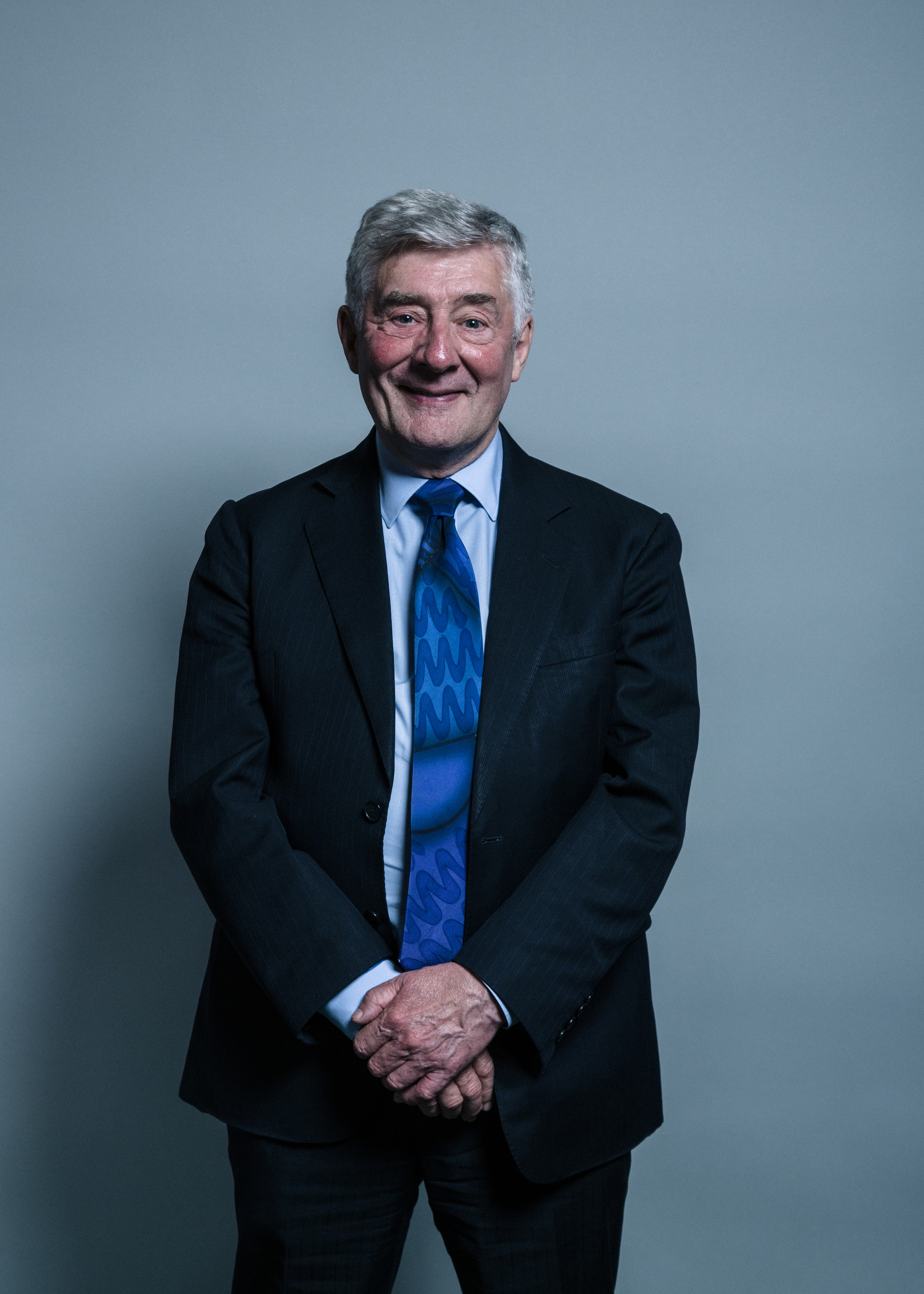
Parliamentary portrait by Chris McAndrew, 2017

In May 2017, Lloyd was selected to stand as the Labour Party's parliamentary candidate for Rochdale at the 2017 general election. He was selected after the incumbent MP, Simon Danczuk, was disallowed from standing again as the Labour candidate, owing to an ongoing internal party investigation into Danczuk's personal conduct. Lloyd was elected with a majority of 14,819.

On 3 July 2017, Lloyd was appointed by Labour leader Jeremy Corbyn as a Shadow Housing Minister. On 23 March 2018, Lloyd became Shadow Secretary of State for Northern Ireland, replacing the sacked Owen Smith. Lloyd has previously campaigned as an MP against the Royal Ulster Constabulary’s use of rubber bullets. In an interview in The House magazine, Lloyd said the role was "more satisfactory" than others, remembering that "years back I was the shadow transport minister and frankly I don’t imagine that anyone remembers anything I said, including me. Whereas there is something more real about the Northern Ireland role because you can be an advocate." When Karen Bradley was Secretary of State for Northern Ireland, she said of Lloyd that " I will say this about conversations with Tony: I learned something from every one of them. Every single time we spoke there was something new—there was a different perspective that Tony gave me, a different way of thinking about things, and he helped me enormously in the task we both had to try to restore devolved government to Northern Ireland when I was Secretary of State and he shadowed me."

Lloyd demonstrated "a deep personal commitment" to engaging with victims of terrorism in Northern Ireland. He personally approached Gregory Campbell MP and volunteered to meet with innocent victims. During the subsequent meeting, Campbell said he was struck by Lloyd’s empathy, his ability to listen attentively to accounts of trauma, and his calm, patient responses to each individual. After stepping down from his front-bench role, Lloyd continued to support victims. Campbell recalled the time when Lloyd tapped him on the shoulder in the Commons and said, “Gregory, I would like to meet those people again.” This, according to Campbell, was a testament to Lloyd’s enduring compassion and humanity.

In December 2019, Lloyd became the Shadow Secretary of State for Scotland, replacing Lesley Laird. Upon Sir Keir Starmer's election as Labour leader in spring 2020, Lloyd was replaced in this post by Ian Murray but continued as Shadow Secretary of State for Northern Ireland. Louise Haigh replaced him on an interim basis in April 2020 after he was admitted to hospital with coronavirus.

Following his discharge from Manchester Royal Infirmary Lloyd stood down from his front bench role to concentrate on his recovery from COVID-19, but vowed to continue his work as a constituency MP. Lloyd had spent 25 days in hospital, including 10 days in intensive care. Lloyd used his experiences to highlight the "enormous decency of NHS staff who sacrificed themselves for patients" like him, and expressed his hopes that the pandemic will help people to "realise that there’s more to life than the next Amazon package".

On 15 February 2021, Lloyd undertook godparenthood for Darya Chultsova, Belarusian journalist and political prisoner.

Lloyd was knighted in the 2021 Birthday Honours for public service.

His 2024 new year message in the Rochdale Observer, published four days before his death, covered events in Gaza, staff morale in the NHS, climate change and heaped praise on Rochdale’s sixth form colleges. In the last weeks before Christmas in the Commons, he spoke on arms exports to Israel, on Rwanda, and his concerns about private renting and the use of pre-payment meters.

Lloyd participated in an interview recorded by pupils of Falinge Park High School in Rochdale. When asked for advice about becoming a politician, Lloyd replied, "Politics is all about people. It’s that sense of human solidarity that matters. If it’s not about making people’s lives better, then don’t be a politician."

== Personal life ==
Lloyd married Judith Tear in 1974. They had three daughters and a son. As a supporter of Manchester United, in March 2011 he tabled an early day motion in the House of Commons for their player Ryan Giggs to be knighted.

=== Illness and death ===
In January 2023, Lloyd revealed that he was undergoing chemotherapy after a recent cancer diagnosis. He said he would not attend Parliament or attend face-to-face functions under medical advice to socially isolate and avoid meetings.

In January 2024, Lloyd announced that he had chosen to end hospital treatment, following his cancer developing into an "aggressive and untreatable leukaemia". On 17 January, he died in the early morning at his home in Manchester, as a result of his illness. He was 73.

=== Tributes ===
Tributes were paid to Lloyd in the House of Commons on 23 January. Keir Starmer said, "always had the time for the little things that matter so much to Members of this House—a friendly word and some encouragement, with that twinkle in his eye that everybody who has ever met him knows and will remember." Rishi Sunak, then Prime Minister, said, "Tony and I of course came from different political traditions, but I deeply respected him as a man of great integrity, compassion and humour, a gentle, but fierce advocate for his constituents and his values, and a dedicated parliamentarian."

Salford MP Rebecca Long Bailey first knew Lloyd from the age of five, when her father, a trade unionist, frequently met with him. In her tribute, she recalled that Lloyd’s real and unending love was for his family. “At the age of five, in Stretford, he was my first ever MP, although I did not know that at the time,” she said. “I was running around his and his wife Judith’s house, driving everyone mad playing She-Ra: Princess of Power with his daughter Siobhan, who was my friend at school. We were usually having a row about who would be in the role of She-Ra that day, causing Tony or Judith to have to come and sort out the problem diplomatically.” She remembered a house and family full of love and warmth, and a family who often supported her own. It was only years later that she came to understand what Lloyd actually did for a living, a realisation that made a lasting impression. Long Bailey noted that, growing up, there was often a perception that MPs came from a different class and that people from backgrounds like hers could not enter politics. “But Tony was different. He was one of us, a man of the people, and a proud member and supporter of the Irish diaspora in Manchester. He gave me the courage to believe that if he had become an MP and could serve to help people, then maybe—just maybe—people like me could do it, too.”

Andrew Western, MP for Stretford and Urmston, said Lloyd "made frequent visits to the campaign trail, was often recognised by local residents and his time as an MP remembered favourably. What was all the more remarkable was the fact that he often recognised those residents too, some 25 years after he had ceased to be the MP for Stretford."

Dawn Butler recalled that Lloyd was supportive when she first came to Parliament in 2005. "He said that if I ever had any questions I could always ask him, no matter how silly those questions were, and I have passed that on to new MPs that come in. I always say, “If you have a silly question, ask me. It’s okay”, because I remember how Tony made me feel when he said that."

== Notes ==
Parliament of the United Kingdom
Preceded by Winston Churchill	Member of Parliament for Stretford; 1983–1997	Constituency abolished
Preceded by Bob Litherland	Member of Parliament for Manchester Central; 1997–2012	Succeeded by Lucy Powell
Preceded by Simon Danczuk	Member of Parliament for Rochdale; 2017–2024	Succeeded by George Galloway
Political offices
Preceded by Ann Clwyd	Chair of the Parliamentary Labour Party; 2006–2012	Succeeded by David Watts
New office	Greater Manchester Police and Crime Commissioner; 2012–2017	Role subsumed into Mayor of Greater Manchester
New office	Interim Mayor of Greater Manchester; 2015–2017	Succeeded by Andy Burnham as Mayor
Preceded by Owen Smith	Shadow Secretary of State for Northern Ireland; 2018–2020	Succeeded by Louise Haigh
Preceded by Lesley Laird	Shadow Secretary of State for Scotland; 2019–2020	Succeeded by Ian Murray
