= Clarence Park =

Clarence Park may refer to:

- Clarence Park (St Albans), a public park in St Albans in which the St Albans City F.C. football stadium is located
- Clarence Park (album), an album by IDM musician Chris Clark named after the park in St Albans
- Clarence Park, Bury, Greater Manchester, England
- Clarence Park, South Australia, a suburb of Adelaide, Australia and part of the electoral district of Ashford
- Clarence Park, Weston-super-Mare, public park in Somerset town formerly used as first-class cricket venue
