= United Nations Security Council Resolution 1257 =

United Nations Security Council resolution

UN Security Council Resolution 1257
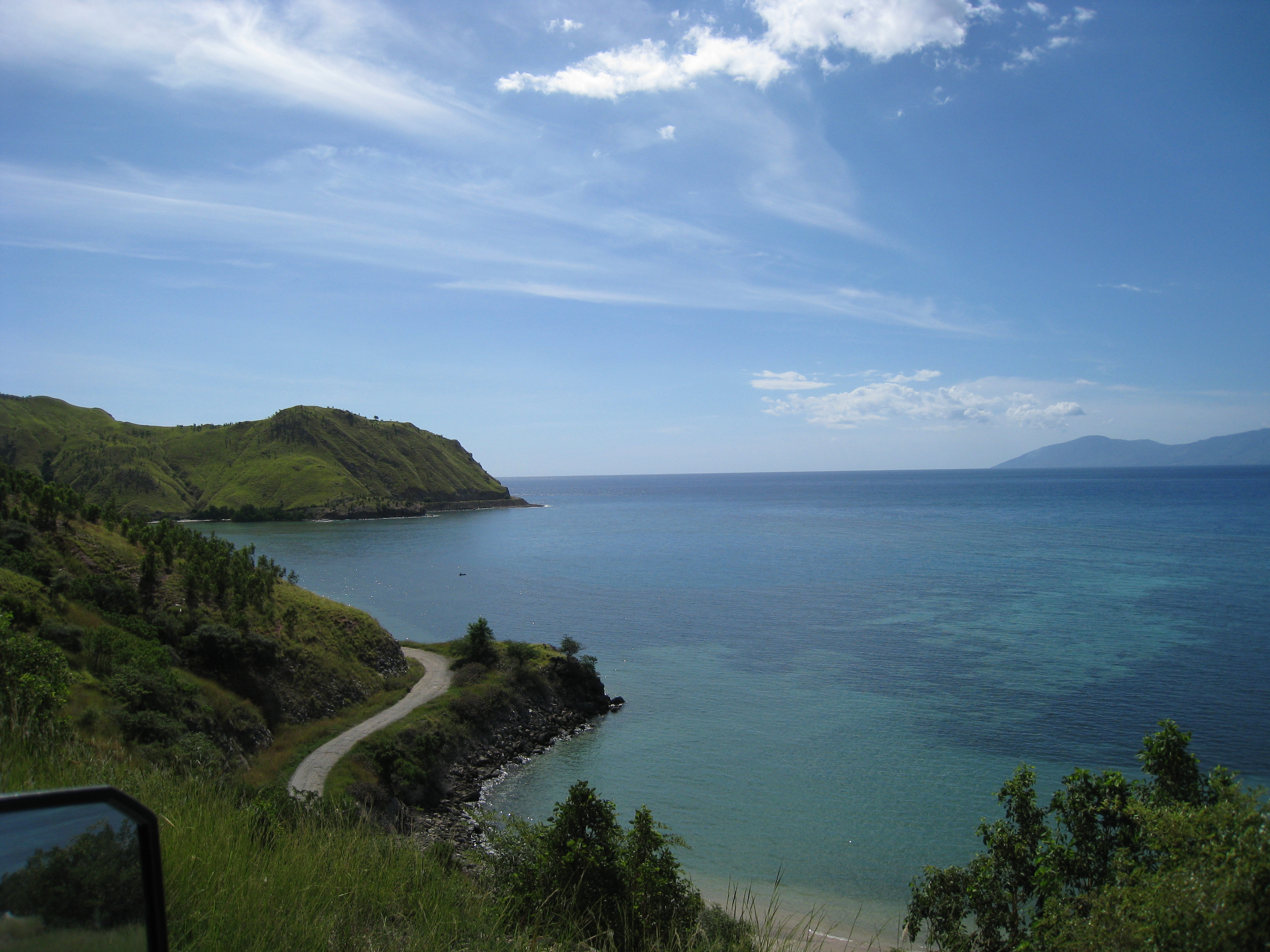
- Coastline in Dili District, East Timor
- Date: 3 August 1999
- Meeting no.: 4,031
- Code: S/RES/1257 (Document)
- Subject: The situation in Timor
- Voting summary: 15 voted for; None voted against; None abstained
- Result: Adopted

Security Council composition
- Permanent members: China; France; Russia; United Kingdom; United States
- Non-permanent members: Argentina; Bahrain; Brazil; Canada; Gabon; Gambia; Malaysia; Namibia; Netherlands; Slovenia

United Nations Security Council resolution 1257, adopted unanimously on 3 August 1999, after recalling previous resolutions on East Timor (Timor Leste), particularly Resolution 1246 (1999), the Council extended the mandate of the United Nations Mission in East Timor (UNAMET) until 30 September 1999.

The Security Council noted that Secretary-General Kofi Annan had decided to postpone the East Timor Special Autonomy Referendum until 30 August 1999 for technical reasons, and extended UNAMET's mandate accordingly. He stated that "as well as a delay in the start of voter registration, UNAMET needed more time to collate the list of voters, publicise it and allow for an appeals procedure".

== See also ==
- 1999 East Timorese crisis
- International Force for East Timor
- Indonesian occupation of East Timor
- United Nations Transitional Administration in East Timor
- List of United Nations Security Council Resolutions 1201 to 1300 (1998–2000)
