= Alan Haworth =

Alan Haworth may refer to:

- Alan Haworth (ice hockey) (born 1960), Canadian ice hockey player
- Alan Haworth, Baron Haworth (1948–2023), British Labour politician

== See also ==
- Alan Howarth (disambiguation)
