= Greater Manchester Police and Crime Commissioner =

Defunct political office in Greater Manchester, United Kingdom

- Police and crime commissioner of Greater Manchester Police
- Reports to: Greater Manchester Police and Crime Panel
- Appointer: Electorate of Greater Manchester
- Term length: Four years
- Constituting instrument: Police Reform and Social Responsibility Act 2011
- Precursor: Greater Manchester Police Authority
- Formation: 21 November 2012
- Final holder: Tony Lloyd
- Abolished: 8 May 2017
- Deputy: Deputy Police and Crime Commissioner
- Salary: £100,000

The Greater Manchester Police and Crime Commissioner was the police and crime commissioner, an elected official tasked with setting out the way crime is tackled by the Greater Manchester Police in Greater Manchester between 2012 and 2017. The post was created on 21 November 2012, following an election held on 15 November 2012, and replaced the Greater Manchester Police Authority. Upon the creation of a Mayor of Greater Manchester and the inaugural election to that position, the duties of Greater Manchester Police and Crime Commissioner were subsumed into the mayoralty and the office itself abolished. For the entirety of its existence, the commissioner was Labour Party politician Tony Lloyd. The police and crime commissioner was required to produce a strategic Greater Manchester Police and Crime Plan, setting out the priorities for the Greater Manchester Police, and their work is scrutinised by the Greater Manchester Police and Crime Panel. In November 2014 it was announced that the role would be replaced with a directly elected Mayor of Greater Manchester, and the term of office of the incumbent commissioner was extended to May 2017.

== Dale Cregan escorts ==
Tony Lloyd criticised the Home Secretary Theresa May for allowing the daily prison escorts of Dale Cregan from Strangeways Prison to Preston Crown Court. He claimed the operation put officers at risk and was unnecessary. Escorting Cregan and his co-accused cost over £5 million. Lloyd Said “So it appears that common sense can be scattered to the wind if you don’t have to pick up the tab. In the end, of course, we’ve all had to pay for this operation because, although the Home Office have agreed to cover some of the costs, the taxpayer is still significantly out of pocket at a time when finances across the public sector are stretched so much.”

== Firearms licences ==
In 2013 Lloyd backed calls to increase the fee for a firearms certificate because of the shortfall in costs for Greater Manchester Police to carry out background checks.

== Elections ==
=== 2012 ===
Greater Manchester Police and Crime Commissioner election, 2012
Party	Candidate	1st round		2nd round			1st round votesTransfer votes, 2nd round
Party	Candidate	Total	Of round	Transfers	Total	Of round	1st round votesTransfer votes, 2nd round
Labour	Tony Lloyd	139,437	51.23%				
Conservative	Michael Winstanley	42,478	15.61%				
Liberal Democrats	Matt Gallagher	40,318	14.81%				
Independent	Roy Warren	26,664	9.80%				
UKIP	Steven Woolfe	23,256	8.55%				
Turnout		272,153	13.59%				
Rejected ballots		6,823	2.45%				
Total votes		278,976	13.93				
Registered electors		2,002,309					
Labour win							
