= Joint Committee on the Draft Registration of Overseas Entities Bill =

British House of Commons Committee

The Joint Committee on the Draft Parliamentary Buildings Bill is a joint select committee of the House of Commons and House of Lords in the Parliament of the United Kingdom. The Committee was established in 2018 with a remit to consider the Draft Registration of Overseas Entities Bill. They were due to report on 10 May 2019.

== Membership ==
As of 19 March 2019, the members of the committee are as follows:

| Member | Party | Constituency |
|---|---|---|
| Peter Aldous MP | Conservative | Waveney |
| Rt. Hon Baroness Barker | Liberal Democrats | N/A |
| Emma Dent Coad MP | Labour | Kensington |
| Rt. Hon Baron Faulkner of Worcester | Labour | N/A |
| Rt. Hon Baron Faulks QC | Conservative | N/A |
| Rt. Hon Baron Garnier Kt PC QC | Conservative | N/A |
| Baron Haworth | Labour | N/A |
| Mark Menzies MP | Conservative | Fylde |
| Mark Pawsey MP | Conservative | Rugby |
| Lloyd Russell-Moyle MP | Labour | Brighton Kemptown |
| Rt. Hon Baron St. John of Bletso | Crossbench | N/A |
| Alison Thewliss MP | SNP | Glasgow Central |

== See also ==
- Joint committee of the Parliament of the United Kingdom
- Parliamentary committees of the United Kingdom
