= United Nations Security Council Resolution 1236 =

UN Security Council Resolution 1236
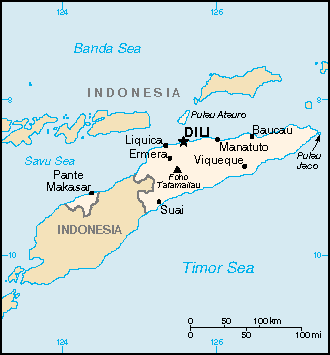
- East Timor
- Date: 7 May 1999
- Meeting no.: 3,998
- Code: S/RES/1236 (Document)
- Subject: The situation in Timor
- Voting summary: 15 voted for; None voted against; None abstained
- Result: Adopted

Security Council composition
- Permanent members: China; France; Russia; United Kingdom; United States
- Non-permanent members: Argentina; Bahrain; Brazil; Canada; Gabon; Gambia; Malaysia; Namibia; Netherlands; Slovenia

United Nations Security Council resolution 1236, adopted unanimously on 7 May 1999, after recalling previous resolutions on East Timor (Timor Leste) including 384 (1975) and 389 (1976), the Council welcomed an agreement between Indonesia and Portugal on the future of East Timor and a proposed United Nations presence to assist with the East Timor Special Autonomy Referendum scheduled for August 1999.

The security council noted the sustained efforts of the governments of both Indonesia and Portugal since July 1983 to find an internationally acceptable solution to the question of East Timor. It welcomed progress made at the last round of talks on 5 May 1999 under the auspices of the Secretary-General Kofi Annan which led to a series of agreements. Agreements between the United Nations and the Governments of Indonesia and Portugal concerning security arrangements for the referendum were also welcomed.

The resolution welcomed the intention of the secretary-general to establish a United Nations presence in East Timor as soon as possible to assist in the implementation of the agreements through conducting the referendum and making police advisers available to the Indonesian police. It stressed the importance of reporting on the outcome of the referendum on autonomy or independence, the responsibility of Indonesia to maintain peace and security in East Timor and ensuring that the United Nations could complete all tasks in the region.

The council welcomed the establishment of a trust fund to allow member states to make voluntary contributions to finance the United Nations presence in East Timor. The Secretary-General was requested to report to the council by 24 May 1999 on the implementation of the agreements and to make recommendations on a future United Nations presence; a decision would then be taken by the Security Council.

== See also ==
- 1999 East Timorese crisis
- Indonesian occupation of East Timor
- International Force for East Timor
- List of United Nations Security Council Resolutions 1201 to 1300 (1998–2000)
- United Nations Transitional Administration in East Timor
