= Greater Manchester Police, Fire and Crime Panel =

Police and fire services scrutiny panel

- Map of the Greater Manchester Police area within the UK
- Type: Police and crime panel
- Location: United Kingdom
- Region served: Greater Manchester
- Field: scrutiny and oversight
- Members: 12
- Website: GMCA Committee Page
- Formerly called: Greater Manchester Police and Crime Panel

The Greater Manchester Police, Fire and Crime Panel is the police and crime panel for Greater Manchester.

== Purpose ==
The purpose of the panel is to scrutinise the directly elected Mayor of Greater Manchester, and their appointed Deputy Mayor for Policing, Crime, Criminal Justice and Fire, who are responsible for the Greater Manchester Police and the Greater Manchester Fire and Rescue Service.

The panel is responsible for confirming the appointment of

- the Deputy Mayor
- the chief fire officer
- the chief constable

== History ==
In June 2020 the panel was given oversight of the Greater Manchester Combined Authority's fire and rescue functions and was renamed from the Greater Manchester Police and Crime Panel to the Greater Manchester Police, Fire and Crime panel.

== Membership ==
The panel is made up of one councillor from each local authority in Greater Manchester who sit alongside at least two additional independent members that have been co-opted because of their relevant skills, knowledge and experience. However the panel also may co-opt additional councillors, with the agreement of the secretary of state as to the number of additional members, to ensure that the political make-up of the panel reflects the political make-up of the local authorities as a whole.
