= Alan Howarth =

Alan Howarth may refer to:

- Alan Howarth, Baron Howarth of Newport, (born 1944), British politician
- Alan Howarth (composer) (born 1948), American soundtrack composer

== See also ==
- Alan Haworth (disambiguation)
