= Stephen Hopgood =

Stephen Hopgood (born 1965) is Professor of International Relations at the SOAS, University of London. He is also the co-director of the Centre for the International Politics of Conflict, Rights and Justice and Associate Dean for Research in the Faculty of Law and Social Sciences. His most recent book is The Endtimes of Human Rights (2013) in which he argues that declining Western power will undermine the prospects for global human rights. His 2006 book, Keepers of the Flame: Understanding Amnesty International, is the first ethnographic account of a global human rights NGO and received the Best Book in Human Rights award from the American Political Science Association. Hopgood is currently working on an edited collection with Jack Snyder and Leslie Vinjamuri titled Human Rights Futures. From 2002 to 2004, he was a Social Science Research Council Fellow in Global Security and Cooperation and from 2009 to 2012 he held a Major Research Fellowship from the Leverhulme Trust. Hopgood is also a regular contributor to the online discussion forum openGlobalRights.

== The Endtimes of Human Rights ==
In The Endtimes of Human Rights, Hopgood argues that the highpoint of human rights coincided with the dominance of American power after the 1970s once decline had set in for the Soviet Union. In the 1990s the end of the Cold War opened up a window of opportunity for all manner of human rights advocates to push for the implementation of international law and the creation of global courts to deliver justice for mass atrocities. But this opening was just a brief hiatus in power politics as usual. The United States has been notoriously uninterested in human rights except as a foreign policy tool. It has avoided most human rights treaties or signed them with reservations that nullify their intent. It has refused to join the International Criminal Court and through some creative legal analysis even practiced torture during the early years of the global war on terror. Now that the power of the United States to do positive good when it does choose to act is waning, its strategy of creating allies to contain a rising China dominating its long-term foreign policy. It is now even less likely than before to put human rights first in regions like South East Asia, Central Asia and the Middle East. This will quickly erode the influence of human rights advocates by undermining the Western political power on which in truth most of their proclaimed achievements rely.

The relative decline of American power has been accompanied by the absolute decline of European power, Hopgood argues. The increasing political influence of the BRICS (Brazil, Russia, India, China and South Africa) and the MINT countries (Mexico, Indonesia, Nigeria and Turkey) means more states wanting a say over who decides global rules and what those rules should say. These newly empowered states will challenge the authority claims of previously dominant powers in areas like global justice and humanitarian intervention. The BRICS and MINT countries will both challenge this system and seek similar sovereign prerogatives for themselves. Either way the outlook is uncertain for further extension of the global human rights regime.

== Criticism of Endtimes ==
The Endtimes of Human Rights has been critiqued by the executive director of Human Rights Watch, Kenneth Roth, who argued that: "Human rights groups long ago learned the importance of addressing the policies that yield human rights violations, rather than only the violations themselves. The broader transformative efforts in which both Amnesty and Human Rights Watch now engage is, in my view, to be celebrated, not denigrated, as Hopgood does, as the sullied world of politics." LSE law professor Conor Gearty argues that Endtimes is "a disturbing read, the anger driving the narrative, the passion evident in every paragraph," but that ultimately "the book does not give a full picture of human rights, hinting only now and again at a different side to the story that – not fitting the bill – is invariably set aside". Amnesty International in the Netherlands produced an author-meets-critics volume on Endtimes with the title Debating the Endtimes of Human Rights.

== Publications ==
- The Endtimes of Human Rights Cornell University Press (2013)
- Keepers of the Flame: Understanding Amnesty International Cornell University Press (2006)
- ‘Saying ‘no’ to Wal-Mart? Money and morality in professional humanitarianism’, chapter in Michael Barnett and Thomas G Weiss (eds.) Humanitarianism in Question: Politics, Power, Ethics (2008) Cornell University Press
- ‘Moral authority, modernity, and the politics of the sacred,’ European Journal of International Relations, vol 15, no 2, (2009)
- ‘Faith in Markets,’ (with Leslie Vinjamuri) in Michael Barnett and Janice Gross Stein (eds) Sacred Aid: Faith and Humanitarianism (2012) Oxford University Press
- ‘Dignity and Ennui: Amnesty International annual report 2009,’ in Journal of Human Rights Practice, vol 2, no 1 (2010)
- ‘Amnesty International’s Growth and Development Since 1961,’ Amnesty International 50 Years Reflections and Perspectives, Wilco de Jonge, Brianne McGonigle Leyh, Anja Mihr, Lars van Troost (eds.) SIM Special No. 36 Utrecht, (2011).
- ‘The Last Rites for Humanitarian Intervention: Darfur, Sri Lanka and R2P,’ Global Responsibility to Protect Special Issue, vol. 6 (2014)
- "The Politics of Moral Authority" (2007) (Unpublished working paper). School of Oriental and African Studies
- "The Tamil Tigers, 1987-2002" (2005) in Gambetta, Diego (ed.), Making Sense of Suicide Missions, pp. 43–76. Oxford University Press
- "Looking beyond the "K-word": Embedded multilateralism in American Foreign Environmental Policy" (2003) in Foot, Rosemary; MacFarlane, Neil; and Mastanduno, Michael (eds.), US Hegemony and International Organizations, pp. 139–164. Oxford University Press
- "Reading the Small Print in Global Civil Society: The Inexorable Hegemony of the Liberal Self" (2000), Millennium: Journal of International Studies, Vol. 29/1, pp.
- American Foreign Environmental Policy and the Power of the State (1998). Oxford University Press
