= Mayor of Greater Manchester =

Political official in Greater Manchester

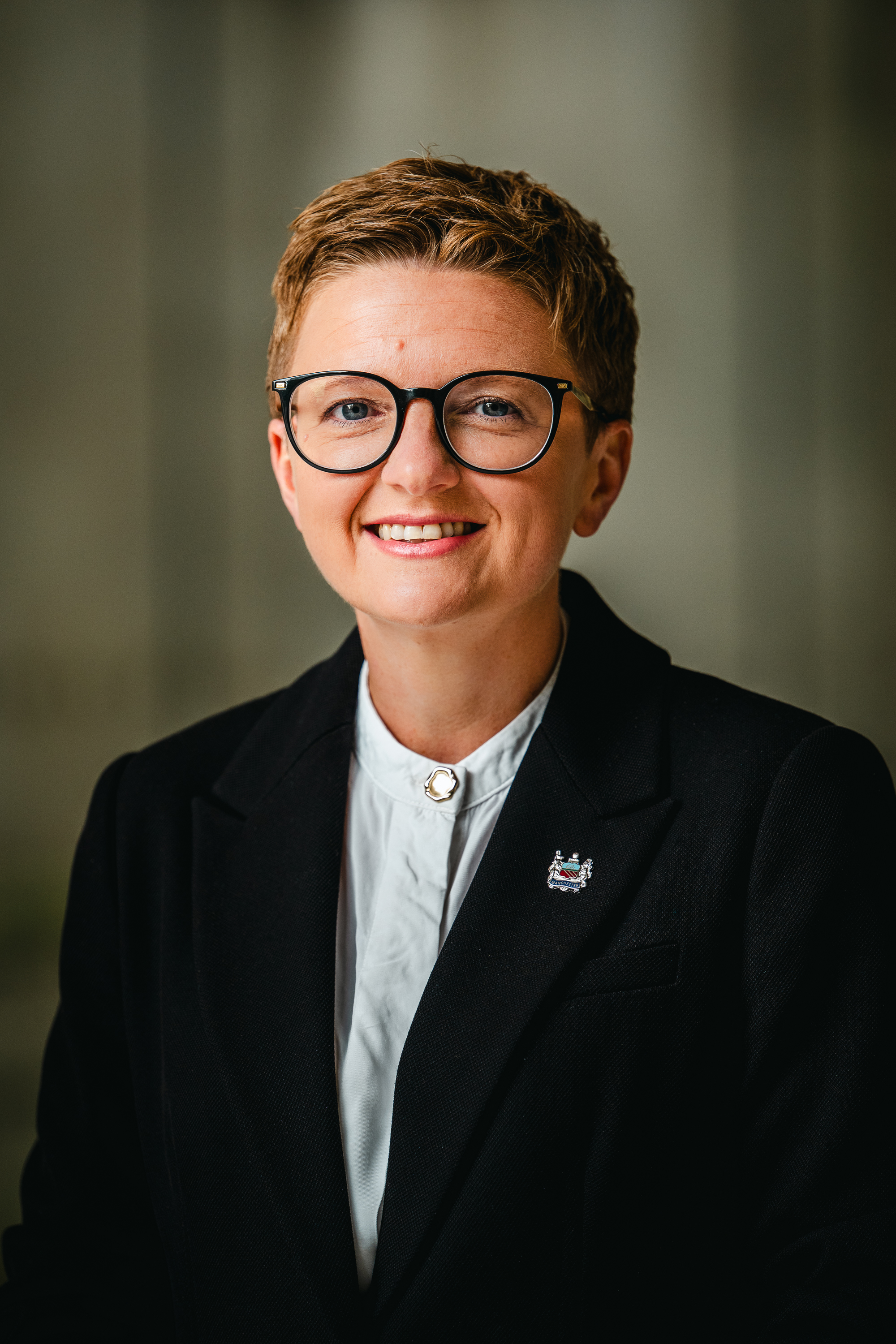
- Incumbent; Bev Craig since 3 August 2026
- Greater Manchester Combined Authority
- Style: Mayor
- Status: Strategic authority mayor of Greater Manchester
- Member of: Greater Manchester Combined Authority
- Seat: Tootal Buildings, Oxford St, Manchester
- Nominator: Political parties or self-nomination
- Appointer: Electorate of Greater Manchester; by supplementary vote (previously FPTP 2022–2026)
- Term length: 4 years, renewable (Note: The first term was originally scheduled to be three years, ending in May 2020, but the election was postponed until May 2021 due to the coronavirus pandemic.)
- Constituting instrument: Cities and Local Government Devolution Act 2016
- Precursor: Chair of the Greater Manchester Combined Authority
- Inaugural holder: Andy Burnham
- Formation: 29 May 2015
- Deputy: Deputy Mayors
- Salary: £114,000
- Website: greatermanchester-ca.gov.uk/the-mayor/

The mayor of Greater Manchester is the directly elected strategic authority mayor of Greater Manchester, responsible for strategic governance in the region that includes health, transport, housing, strategic planning, waste management, policing, the Greater Manchester Fire and Rescue Service and skills. The creation of the mayor of Greater Manchester was agreed between the then Chancellor of the Exchequer, George Osborne, and Greater Manchester's 10 district council leaders. As well as having specific powers, the mayor chairs the Greater Manchester Combined Authority, also assuming the powers of the Greater Manchester Police and Crime Commissioner.

Tony Lloyd was appointed as interim mayor for Greater Manchester in May 2015. The first Greater Manchester mayoral election took place on 4 May 2017 and was won by Andy Burnham, who was subsequently re-elected for a second term in May 2021 and for a third in May 2024.

Paul Dennett was acting in the absence of a mayor, as he is legally required to do as deputy mayor, following Burnham's election to the House of Commons in the 2026 Makerfield by-election which disqualified him from holding the post. The 2026 Greater Manchester mayoral by-election was held on 30 July 2026, and was won by Bev Craig.

== Background ==
The ten local authorities which make up Greater Manchester work together as the Greater Manchester Combined Authority, which carries out work through bodies including Transport for Greater Manchester and the Greater Manchester Waste Disposal Authority. There is a directly elected Mayor of Salford for the City of Salford. In 2008, Bury rejected a proposal for an elected mayor for the borough only. In 2012, Manchester rejected a similar proposal for the City of Manchester only. There is also a Lord Mayor of Manchester which is a ceremonial post.

The proposal for an elected mayor was announced in November 2014 by George Osborne. The creation of an elected mayor for Greater Manchester required new primary legislation and the first election was announced to take place on 4 May 2017. On 29 May 2015, Tony Lloyd was appointed as interim mayor by the combined authority leaders. The Labour Party candidate was confirmed as being Andy Burnham on 9 August 2016, fending off Ivan Lewis and Tony Lloyd to the position. The Liberal Democrats candidate was confirmed in September 2016 as Jane Brophy, who is a Trafford Borough councillor. Later in September, the Green Party announced that their candidate would be Deyika Nzeribe; however Nzeribe later died as a result of a heart attack on New Year's Day 2017 and Will Patterson was chosen to replace him. In October 2016, the Conservative Party announced that Sean Anstee, Leader of Trafford Metropolitan Borough Council, would run as their candidate for mayor.

== Governance arrangements ==
Unlike the directly elected London Assembly scrutiny structure that operates in Greater London, the mayor of Greater Manchester sits on the Greater Manchester Combined Authority alongside the ten council leaders as the eleventh member. The council leaders form part of the mayor's cabinet, each with a clear portfolio of responsibilities. The mayor can be vetoed if a majority vote against any proposals put forward, and the spatial planning strategy requires a unanimous vote of the mayor's cabinet.

== Powers and functions ==
Powers of the mayor initially announced include spatial planning, housing, transport, policing, waste management and skills. In addition to setting the policy direction of the GMCA the mayor serves as an ambassador and public figurehead for the region.

=== Planning ===
The mayor is responsible for the creation of a county-wide spatial development strategy with adoption subject to unanimous approval of the Members of the GMCA. The mayor is able to make compulsory purchase orders and establish a Mayoral Development Corporation for an area subject to the agreement of the members whose district(s) the order/corporation covers. The mayor has not been granted the ability to call in local planning application decisions judged to be of strategic importance, unlike some other combined authority mayors.

=== Housing ===
The mayor oversees the administration of the £300m Greater Manchester Housing Investment Fund with the intention of delivering an additional 15,000 homes over a 10-year period. The mayor jointly controls the Greater Manchester Land Commission with the housing minister and other appropriate government ministers, which includes a database of all public sector land and oversee its efficient use including disposal with the aim of contributing toward a target of 10,000 homes being built annually in the region.

=== Policing and fire ===
With the creation of the office of mayor, the role of Police and Crime Commissioner for Greater Manchester was subsumed into the new post. The mayor also took over the role formerly exercised by the Greater Manchester Fire & Rescue Authority in setting budgets and taking strategic decisions.

=== Waste management ===
The mayor is responsible for the administration of the Greater Manchester Waste Disposal Authority, which is the largest waste disposal authority in the United Kingdom responsible for the waste of 2.4 million people and covering all districts except Wigan which has its own waste authority.

=== Skills ===
The GMCA will have full control of the apprenticeship and adult skills budget for the region from the 2018/19 academic year as well as a commitment to explore devolution of 16–19 education spending. The combined authority also has the power to co-commission alongside the Department for Work and Pensions, the region's unemployment and back to work programmes.

=== Justice ===
As part of the 2016 UK Budget, it was announced that powers relating to criminal justice would be devolved to the mayor as part of a drive to offer seamless interventions for offenders transitioning between prisons and the community and also to join up public services that prevent crime. As part of this, there will also be a new 'Life Chances Investment Fund' which combines several streams of funding for troubled families and back to work for programmes for those with health issues. GMCA will take on the commissioning of National Offender Management Services, liaise in the commissioning of rehabilitation programmes, youth justice and secure schools and female and child sentences under 2 years. The GMCA will also liaise in the running of the court and prison estates and there is an eventual government aim to fully devolve the prisons estate.

=== Health ===
The £6 billion health and social care budget for the region is devolved to the GMCA and the mayor works alongside the other members and the 22 local clinical commissioning groups to set budgets and direct spending priorities. The GMCA has worked with the commissioning groups in the creation of a strategic sustainability plan.

=== Transport ===
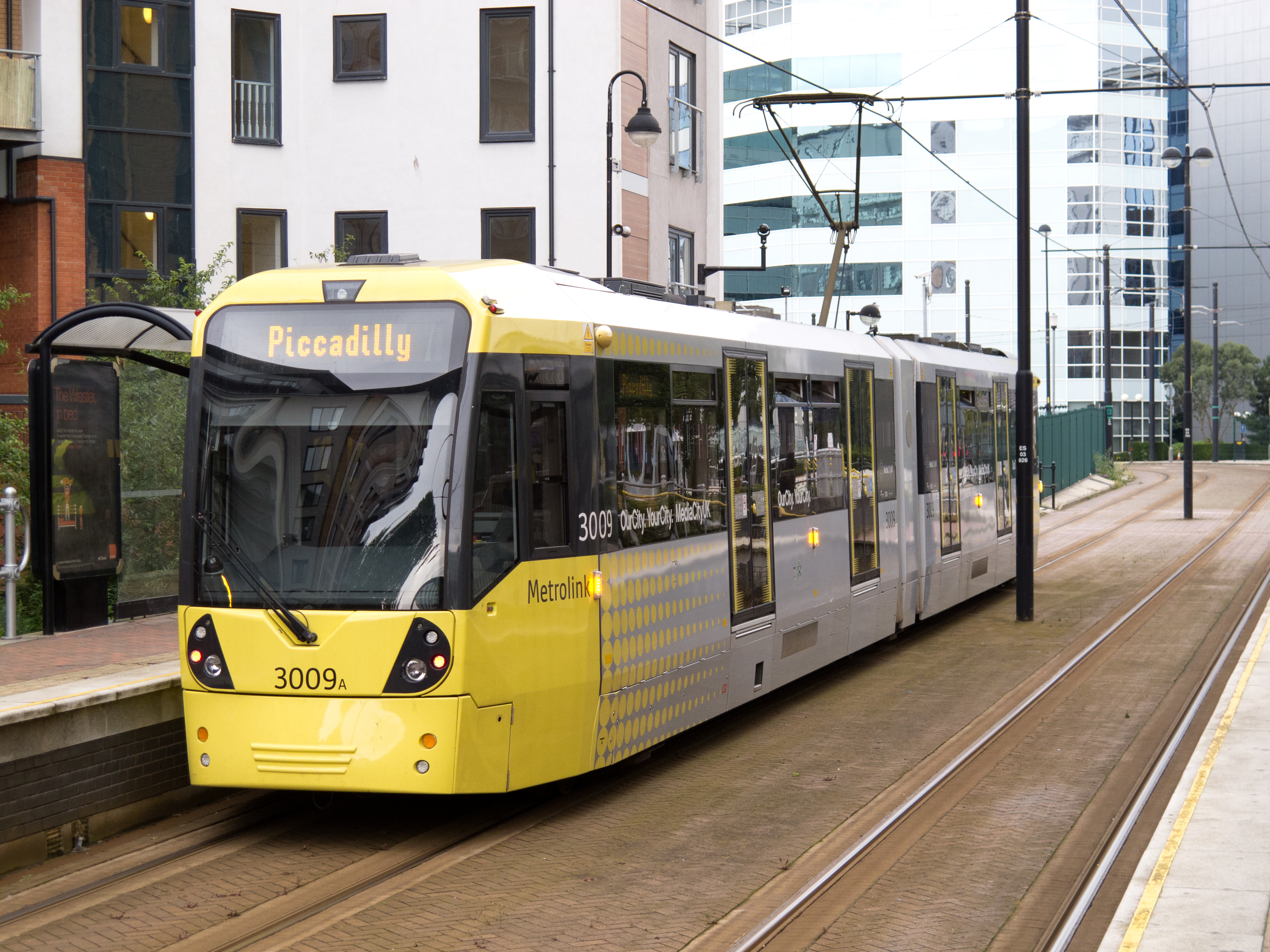
The cross-borough Manchester Metrolink which has grown from 20 stops in 2009 to 92 in 2014

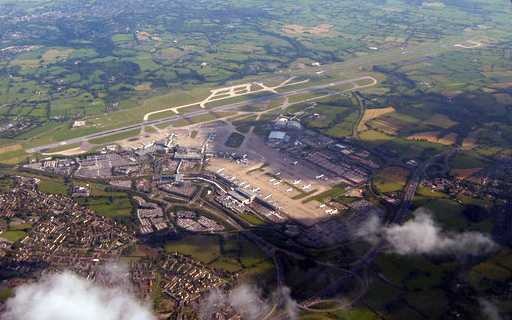
Manchester Airport is the largest publicly operated airport in the UK, owned in part by the ten councils of Greater Manchester.

The mayor possesses powers over transport in Greater Manchester.

The successful delivery of large infrastructure such as the second runway at the publicly owned Manchester Airport in 1998, the amalgamation of the M60 orbital motorway in 2000 and a rapidly expanding and self-sustainable Metrolink tram system - from 20 stations in 2009 to 92 stations in 2014 - emboldened local authorities and instilled confidence at Whitehall. Responsibilities include overseeing road management (transferred to TfGM in 2009) which include road safety, bus lanes and congestion as well as influence over bus services, the Metrolink tram system and cycling schemes. The regional rail network within Greater Manchester, run mostly by Northern Trains and in parts by TransPennine Express, is franchised by the UK government with no direct control by the mayor (though some potential for input exists via Transport for the North).

The mayor is responsible for the creation of the Local Transport Plan for the region outlining policy and spending decision subject to a 2/3rd majority ratification. The mayor is also responsible for allocating £300m of infrastructure funding over 30 years from the government as well as a yet to be finalised transport funding settlement to follow the existing 2014-2019 settlement. The mayor also has powers to reform the local bus market following the passage of the Bus Services Act 2017.

In October 2018, the mayor of Greater Manchester, Andy Burnham, stated his powers to influence transport improvements in the region were insufficient. He described the performance of Northern since the May 2018 timetable as "shocking", the struggle to introduce an holistic bus franchising system as a continuing "challenge" and congestion on the roads as an impediment to the region's future growth - without government action this would result in lost opportunities for Greater Manchester.

The creation of the Bee Network launched in September 2023 is a integrated transport system linking bus, tram, bicycle and train travel which has been a emerging tenet of transport policy in the region and has been endorsed under Burnham's tenure.

=== Intergovernmental relations ===
The mayor is a member of the Mayoral Council for England and the Council of the Nations and Regions.

== List of mayors ==
Colour key
(for political parties)
Labour

Mayors of Greater Manchester
Name	Portrait	Term of office		Elected	Political party	Previous and concurrent occupations
Tony Lloyd; Interim		29 May 2015	8 May 2017	—N/a	Labour	MP for Stretford (1983–1997); MP for Manchester Central (1997–2012); Greater Manchester Police and Crime Commissioner (2012–2017)
Andy Burnham		8 May 2017	19 June 2026	2017; 2021; 2024	Labour and Co-operative	MP for Leigh (2001–2017); Chief Secretary to the Treasury (2007–2008); Secretary of State for Culture, Media and Sport (2008–2009); Secretary of State for Health (2009–2010)
Paul Dennett; Acting		19 June 2026	3 August 2026	—N/a	Labour	Deputy Mayor of Greater Manchester (2021–present); Mayor of Salford (2016–present); Member of Salford City Council for Langworthy (2012–2016)
Bev Craig		3 August 2026	Incumbent	2026 by-election	Labour and Co-operative	Leader of Manchester City Council (2021–2026); Deputy Leader of Manchester City Council (May–December 2021); Member of Manchester City Council (2011–2026); Member of the Greater Manchester Combined Authority (2021–2026)

=== Deputy mayors ===
Deputy mayors of Greater Manchester
Name	Portrait	Term of office		Political party	Previous and concurrent occupations
Sir Richard Leese		8 May 2017	8 December 2021	Labour	Leader of Manchester City Council (1996–2021); Member of Manchester City Council for Crumpsall (1984–2022)
Paul Dennett		8 December 2021	Incumbent	Labour	Acting Mayor of Greater Manchester (June–August 2026); Mayor of Salford (2016–present); Member of Salford City Council for Langworthy (2012–2016)

==== Deputy mayors for safer and stronger communities ====
Deputy mayors of Greater Manchester for safer and stronger communities (also known as Deputy Mayor of Greater Manchester for Policing, Fire and Crime)
Name	Portrait	Term of office		Political party	Previous and concurrent occupations
Beverley Hughes, Baroness Hughes of Stretford		8 May 2017	9 January 2023	Labour	MP for Stretford and Urmston (1997–2010)
Kate Green		9 January 2023	Incumbent	Labour	MP for Stretford and Urmston (2010–2022)

== Elections ==
The first election by supplementary vote took place in 2017. The normal cycle of elections is one every four years, with the first term lasting three years. The second election was delayed for one year because of the COVID-19 pandemic and took place in 2021. The third election in 2024 was the first on the regular four-year cycle and was the only election to use first-past-the-post voting. Andy Burnham was the winner of the first three elections.

The position of mayor became vacant in June 2026 following Burnham's election to the House of Commons in the 2026 Makerfield by-election which disqualified him from holding the post. (Note: Mayors that have police and crime commissioner powers cannot be members of Parliament.) The 2026 Greater Manchester mayoral by-election was announced on 19 June 2026 and was held on 30 July 2026. Elections will return to the four-year cycle from the 2028 Greater Manchester mayoral election.

== Timeline ==
Timeline
