= Dianne Hayter =

British politician and member of the House of Lords

The Right Honourable The Baroness Hayter of Kentish Town
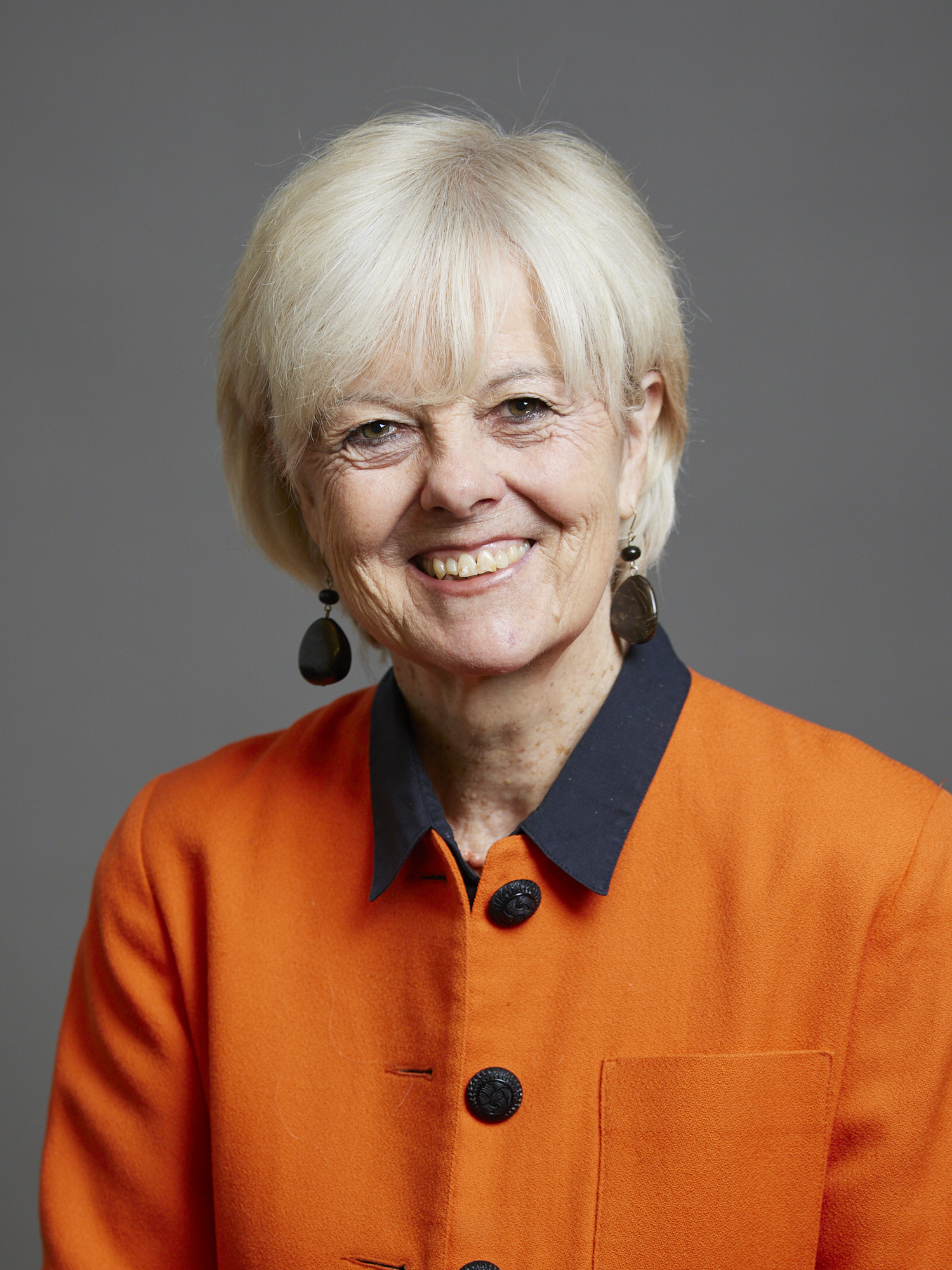
- Official portrait, 2022

Shadow Deputy Leader of the House of Lords
- In office 27 June 2017 – 13 October 2021
- Leader: The Baroness Smith of Basildon
- Preceded by: The Lord Hunt of Kings Heath
- Succeeded by: The Lord Collins of Highbury

Member of the House of Lords
- Lord Temporal
- Life peerage 22 June 2010

Personal details
- Born: 7 September 1949 (age 77) Hanover, Lower Saxony, West Germany
- Party: Labour Co-operative
- Education: Trevelyan College, Durham (BA); University of London

Dianne Hayter, Baroness Hayter of Kentish Town (born 7 September 1949) is a British politician serving as a Member of the House of Lords since 2010. A member of the Labour and Co-operative Party, she was Shadow Deputy Leader of the House of Lords from 2017 to 2021.

Hayter represented Socialist Societies on the National Executive Committee of the Labour Party from 1998 to 2010, chairing the committee from 2007 to 2008. She served in numerous opposition front bench roles in the Lords from 2011 until 2021, when she became Chair of the International Agreements Committee.

== Early life ==
She is the daughter of Flt Lt Alec Bristow Hayter (died 1972), and Nancy Evans (died 1959). Educated at Trevelyan College, Durham University, where she studied Social and Public Administration (BA), she gained a doctorate at London University in 2004.

== Professional career ==
Hayter was a Director of Alcohol Concern from 1984 to 1990, and Director of Corporate Affairs for the Wellcome Trust from 1996 to 1999.

She served as a board member of a number of organisations, including the Financial Reporting Council's Board for Actuarial Standards, the Determinations Panel of The Pensions Regulator, the Surveying Ombudsman Service, and the Insolvency Practices Council. Hayter chaired the Legal Services Consumer Panel, and was formerly vice chairman of the Financial Services Authority Consumer Panel and chair of the Consumer Panel of the Bar Standards Board. She was a JP from 1976 to 1990.

== Political career ==
Hayter was the General Secretary of the Fabian Society between 1976 and 1982 and Chief Executive of the European Parliamentary Labour Party during 1990 to 1996. She is a vice president of the Fabian Society.

She sat on Labour's National Executive Committee from 1998 to 2010 and chaired it in 2007–08.

The Labour History Archive and Study Centre at the People's History Museum in Manchester holds the personal papers of Dianne Hayter in their collection, spanning the period from the late 1970s to 2010.

=== House of Lords ===
On 22 June 2010, she was created a life peer as Baroness Hayter of Kentish Town, of Kentish Town in the London Borough of Camden, and was introduced in the House of Lords the same day.

She was an Opposition Whip from October 2011 to September 2015.

Between 2012 and 2021, Hayter discontinuously served as a Shadow Spokesperson for the following departments:

- Business, Innovation and Skills, later Business, Energy and Industrial Strategy
- Cabinet Office
- Digital, Culture, Media and Sport
- Exiting the European Union
- Wales
- Women and Equalities

She was elected Deputy leader of Labour in the Lords in June 2017.

She is a member of Labour Friends of Israel.

In July 2019, Jeremy Corbyn sacked her as Shadow Brexit Spokesperson for making what the party called "deeply offensive" remarks at a Labour First meeting. Hayter asserted that the party's leadership was not open to external views and suggested those around Corbyn were "in a bunker" like the "last days of Hitler". Despite this, she remained deputy leader in the Lords, as that was an elected position.

== Personal life ==
Dianne Hayter lives in Islington, London with her husband, Professor (Anthony) David Caplin, whom she married in 1994.

== Publications ==
Hayter has written Fabian Tract no. 451—The Labour Party: Crisis and Prospects (September 1977), Fightback—Labour's traditional right in the 1970s and 1980s (2005), and Men Who Made Labour—Celebrating the Centenary of the Parliamentary Labour Party (2006) (with Lord Haworth).

- The Labour Party: crisis and prospects (Fabian Soc.), 1977;
- (contrib.) Labour in the Eighties, 1980;
- (contrib.) Prime Minister Portillo and Other Things that Never Happened, 2003;
- Fightback!: Labour's Traditional Right in the 1970s and 1980s, 2005;
- (ed jtly with Lord Haworth) Men Who Made Labour, 2006;
- (contrib.) From the Workhouse to Welfare, 2009.

Party political offices
Preceded by Thomas Ponsonby	General Secretary of the Fabian Society; 1976–1982	Succeeded by Ian Martin
Preceded by Oonagh McDonald	Chair of the Fabian Society; 1992–1993	Succeeded by Ben Pimlott
Preceded by Ian McCartney	Socialist societies representative on the Labour Party National Executive Committee; 1998–2010	Succeeded by Keith Vaz and Simon Wright
