= Clarence Park, Bury =

Urban park in Greater Manchester, England

Clarence Park
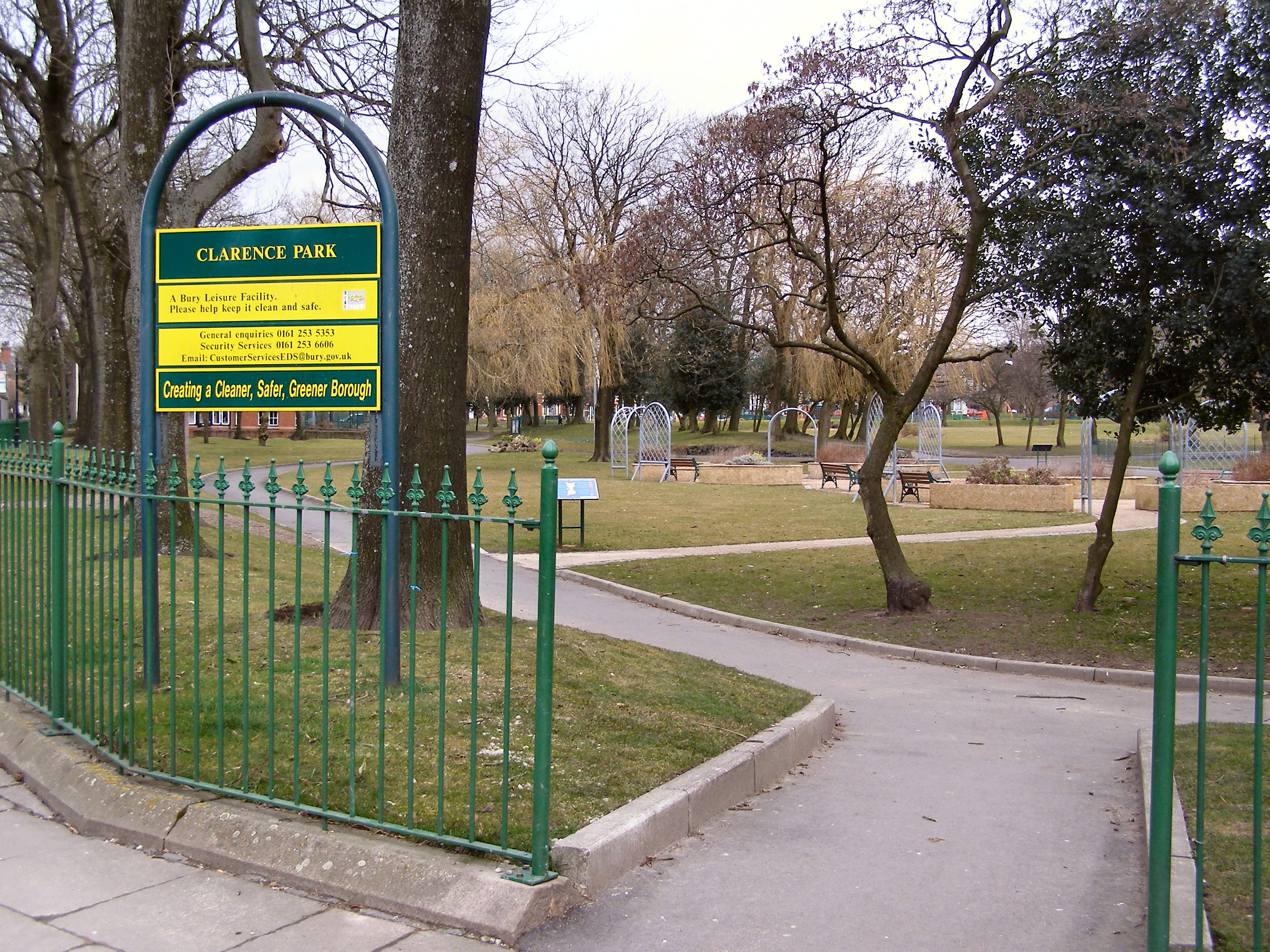
- Entrance to Clarence Park
- Interactive map of Clarence Park
- Location: Bury, Greater Manchester
- Nearest city: Manchester
- Coordinates: 53.606°N 2.287°W
- Created: 1888
- Operator: Bury Council
- Awards: Green Flag

Clarence Park is a Green Flag awarded public park located in Bury, Greater Manchester. It is the largest urban park in the borough, and was opened to the public in 1888.

The park's facilities include a bandstand, a skate park, tennis courts, a children's play area, a skate park, bowling green, a football pitch and a café.

A lido with parking facilities offers angling opportunities and is home to a model boat club. Originally a reservoir, it was opened to the public in 1963.
