= Keepers of the Flame: Understanding Amnesty International =

2006 book by Stephen Hopgood

- Author: Stephen Hopgood
- Language: English
- Subject: International politics
- Genre: Non-fiction
- Publisher: Cornell University Press
- Publication date: 2006
- Media type: Print (hardback and paperback)
- Pages: 249
- ISBN: 0-8014-4402-0

Keepers of the Flame: Understanding Amnesty International is a book by the British political scientist Stephen Hopgood. The book examines the history, structure, and internal culture of the human rights organization Amnesty International. Published in 2006 by Cornell University Press, Keepers of the Flame received the Best Book on Human Rights award from the American Political Science Association the following year.

The book combines both a journalistic and an anthropological approach and is based on interviews, archival information, and participant observation carried out by Hopgood at Amnesty International in 2002–2003.
