= Georg Charpentier =

Georg Charpentier (born 11 August 1956 in El Salvador) currently serves as United Nations Deputy Special Representative and Resident Coordinator in Libya. He was appointed to this position by the United Nations Secretary-General Ban Ki-moon on 19 September 2011. Previously, he was the Deputy Special Representative of the United Nations Secretary-General for Côte d'Ivoire. In this capacity, he is responsible for Humanitarian Coordination, Recovery and Reconstruction, Resident Representative of the United Nations Development Programme (UNDP), Resident Coordinator of the United Nations System in Côte d'Ivoire and Humanitarian Coordinator.

For more than two decades, Charpentier has been working with the UN and serving in different functions. His first position with the Organization was a Programme Officer in Vietnam, where he started in 1984. He then moved on to different posts in a variety of countries, including Mauritania, Mali, São Tomé and Príncipe, Lesotho and Ethiopia. In Congo and Burundi, he served as Resident Representative and Resident Humanitarian Coordinator.

His senior appointment within the UN include deputy director of UNDP's Bureau of Crisis Prevention and Recovery, in Geneva. In this capacity, he was responsible for countries in transition and in post-crisis situations, the reduction of the circulation of small arms, demobilisation, prevention of catastrophes and assistance to countries seeking to adapt their programmes to post-crisis situations.

Charpentier also served as coordinator of the UN System and resident representative in Burkina Faso since 2004. In 2006, he went to Burundi to help prepare for the creation of the UN Integrated Office in Burundi.

Charpentier has a master's degree in economics (1981) from Helsinki University.
