= United Nations Security Council Resolution 1246 =

UN Security Council Resolution 1246
- UNAMET medal bar
- Date: 11 June 1999
- Meeting no.: 4,013
- Code: S/RES/1246 (Document)
- Subject: The situation in Timor
- Voting summary: 15 voted for; None voted against; None abstained
- Result: Adopted

Security Council composition
- Permanent members: China; France; Russia; United Kingdom; United States
- Non-permanent members: Argentina; Bahrain; Brazil; Canada; Gabon; Gambia; Malaysia; Namibia; Netherlands; Slovenia

United Nations Security Council resolution 1246, adopted unanimously on 11 June 1999, after recalling previous resolutions on East Timor (Timor Leste), particularly Resolution 1236 (1999), the council established the United Nations Mission in East Timor (UNAMET) to organise and conduct the East Timor Special Autonomy Referendum on the future status of East Timor, scheduled for August 1999.

The security council recalled the agreements between Indonesia and Portugal on a referendum in East Timor. It noted with concern at the "tense and volatile" situation described by the Secretary-General Kofi Annan in his report, and the need for reconciliation between competing factions in the territory.

The council then authorised the establishment of UNAMET until 31 August 1999 to organise and conduct a referendum on whether the East Timorese people accepted a proposal for autonomy within Indonesia or rejected the option which would have led to the independence of the territory. UNAMET would consist of 280 police to advise the Indonesian National Police and 50 military liaison officers to maintain contact with the Indonesian National Armed Forces. It would also consist of a political component responsible for monitoring political freedoms, an electoral component responsible for voting and registration and an information component responsible for explaining the terms of the referendum to the East Timorese people. Additionally, the governments of Indonesia and Portugal were to send observers to the region.

The council urged Indonesia to conclude a Status of Forces Agreement with the United Nations; called upon all parties to co-operate UNAMET; and stressed the responsibility of Indonesia to provide security throughout the process. It also condemned all violence and called for steps towards demilitarisation. The Secretary-General was requested to report every 14 days on the implementation of the current resolution.

== See also ==
- 1999 East Timorese crisis
- Indonesian occupation of East Timor
- International Force for East Timor
- List of United Nations Security Council Resolutions 1201 to 1300 (1998–2000)
- United Nations Transitional Administration in East Timor
