= United Nations Security Council Resolution 389 =

UN Security Council Resolution 389
- East Timor
- Date: 22 April 1976
- Meeting no.: 1,914
- Code: S/RES/389 (Document)
- Voting summary: 12 voted for; None voted against; 2 abstained; 1 absent
- Result: Adopted

Security Council composition
- Permanent members: China; France; Soviet Union; United Kingdom; United States
- Non-permanent members: Benin; Guyana; Italy; Japan; Libya; Pakistan; Panama; Romania; Sweden; Tanzania

United Nations Security Council Resolution 389, adopted on April 22, 1976, reaffirmed the right of the people of East Timor to self-determination. The Council called upon all states to respect the territorial integrity of East Timor and upon the Government of Indonesia to withdraw all of its forces from the Territory. The Resolution then asks the Secretary-General to have his Special Representative pursue consultations with the parties concerned and that the Secretary-General follow the implementation of the resolution and submit a report to the Council as soon as possible. The Council goes on to call upon all states and parties to cooperate fully with the United Nations to achieve a peaceful solution and facilitate the decolonization of the territory.

The resolution was adopted with 12 votes to none, with Japan and the United States abstaining. Benin did not participate in the voting.

== See also ==
- History of East Timor
- Indonesian invasion of East Timor
- Indonesian occupation of East Timor
- List of United Nations Security Council Resolutions 301 to 400 (1971–1976)
