= Alan Haworth, Baron Haworth =

British politician (1948–2023)

The Right Honourable The Lord Haworth
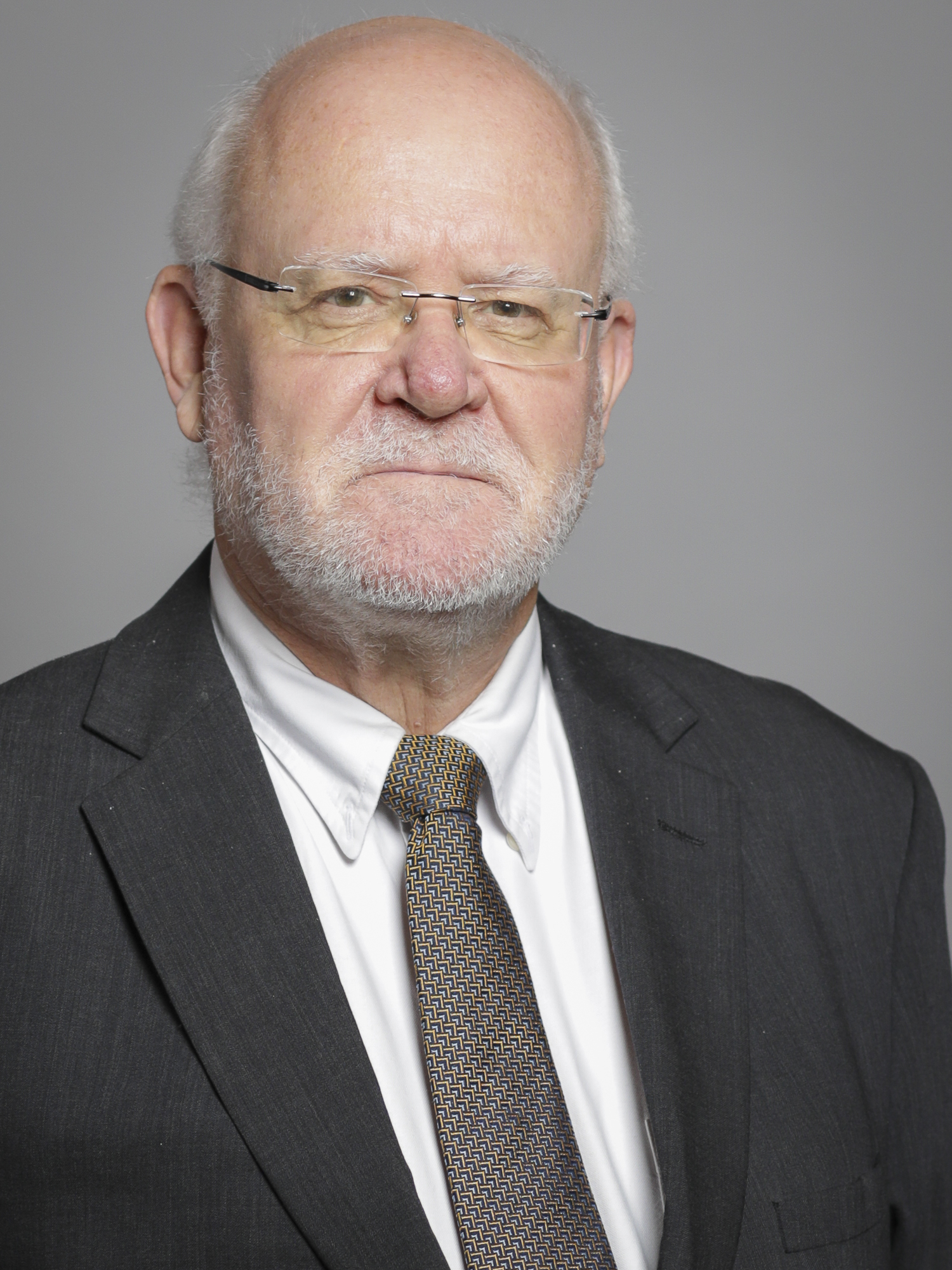
- Official portrait, 2019

Member of the House of Lords
- Lord Temporal
- Life peerage 28 June 2004 – 28 August 2023

Personal details
- Born: Alan Robert Haworth; 26 April 1948 Blackburn, Lancashire, England
- Died: 28 August 2023 (aged 75) Reykjavík, Iceland
- Party: Labour
- Spouse: Maggie Rae (m. 1991)
- Education: University of St Andrews; Barking Regional College of Technology

Alan Robert Haworth, Baron Haworth (26 April 1948 – 28 August 2023) was a British Labour politician. He was an official in the party from 1975 to 2004, including serving as Secretary of the Parliamentary Labour Party from 1992 to 2004. In 2004, he was appointed to the House of Lords as a life peer.

== Early life ==
Alan Haworth grew up in the Blackburn suburb of Revidge, where his family owned a grocery shop, and was educated at St Silas School, Blackburn and Blackburn Technical & Grammar School. He attended the University of St Andrews to study medicine, but left after one year's study. He then studied for a degree in sociology at the Barking Regional College of Technology, from which he graduated in 1971. He then worked from 1973 to 1975 as a registrar at the university.

== Parliamentary career ==
Haworth was appointed to the staff of the Parliamentary Labour Party in 1975, became Senior Committee Officer in 1985, and served as Secretary of the PLP from 1992 to 2004. He was elevated to the House of Lords on 28 June 2004 as a life peer as Baron Haworth, of Fisherfield in Ross and Cromarty.

In December 2009, Haworth was accused by The Times of earning £100,000 in expenses by pretending that his main home was a cottage in Scotland. Following an investigation by Michael Pownall, Clerk of the Parliaments, Haworth was cleared of wrongdoing in February 2010.

== Writings ==
Haworth was the author of 113 obituaries of former Labour MPs, some published in Politico's Book of the Dead 2003, and the joint editor (with Dianne Hayter) of Men Who Made Labour, obituaries of the first 29 Labour MPs elected to Parliament in 1906.

== Personal life and death ==
Haworth married Maggie Rae, a lawyer, in 1991. He died of a heart attack in Reykjavík, Iceland, on 28 August 2023, while on holiday with his wife. Former prime minister Tony Blair said, "In all the years I knew Alan, he never wavered in his belief in, and commitment to, the party. He served it with distinction and true and dedicated loyalty."
