= United Nations Mission in East Timor =

Referendum administration organization

- Abbreviation: UNAMET
- Formation: 11 June 1999
- Type: Referendum Support
- Legal status: Completed
- Head: Ian Martin
- Parent organization: United Nations Security Council
- Website: www.un.org/etimor

The United Nations Mission in East Timor (UNAMET) was established by Security Council Resolution 1246 on 11 June 1999 for a period up to 31 August 1999. By Security Council Resolution 1257 of 3 August UNAMET was extended to 30 September 1999.

== Mandate ==
To organise and conduct a popular consultation on the basis of a direct, secret and universal ballot, to ascertain whether the East Timorese people accept the proposed constitutional framework providing for a special autonomy for East Timor within the unitary Republic of Indonesia or reject the proposed special autonomy for East Timor, leading to East Timor's separation from Indonesia, in accordance with the General Agreement and to enable the Secretary-General to discharge his responsibility under paragraph 3 of the Security Agreement.

== Staff ==
- Special Representative of the Secretary-General and Head of Mission: Mr Ian Martin (United Kingdom)
- Personal Representative of the Secretary-General: Ambassador Jamsheed Marker (Pakistan)
- Deputy Personal Representative of the Secretary-General: Mr Francesc Vendrell (Spain)
- Chief of Civilian Police: Commissioner Alan Mills (Australia)
- Chief Military Liaison Officer: Brigadier General Rezaqul Haider (Bangladesh)
- Electoral Commissioners: Patrick A. Bradley (Ireland), Johann Kriegler (South Africa) and Bong-Scuk Sohn (South Korea)
- Chief Electoral Officer: Mr Jeff Fischer (United States)
- Chief Administrative Officer: Mr Johanes Wortel (The Netherlands)
- Chief Political Officer: Ms Beng Yong Chew (Singapore)
- Chief of Public Information: Mr David Wimhurst (Canada)

In addition, the representatives were supported by an international staff of about 210 people. A civilian police force of 271 (at full deployment) was provided by Argentina, Australia, Austria, Bangladesh, Brazil, Canada, Egypt, Ghana, Ireland, Italy, Japan, Jordan, Malaysia, Mozambique, Nepal, New Zealand, Pakistan, Philippines, Portugal, Republic of Korea, Russian Federation, Senegal, Spain, Sweden, Thailand, United Kingdom, Uruguay, US and Zimbabwe. In addition, 50 Military Liaison Officers were provided by Australia, Austria, Bangladesh, Brazil, Denmark, Ireland, Malaysia, New Zealand, Portugal, Russian Federation, Thailand, United Kingdom, US, Uruguay. The international team was completed by the deployment of about 420 UN volunteers from 67 countries providing district electoral officers, support staff and medical services.

The international team was supplemented by local staff to support voter registration and to staff polling stations.

== In popular culture ==
- UNAMET is depicted in the ABC television series, Answered By Fire (2006).
- Hazel, Geoff (2020). Picture a Dry Riverbed. Historical autobiography of the civilian police in the District of Ermera, East Timor as they assisted in the conduct of the Popular Consultation.
- Pemper, Tammy (2019). Scorched Earth. Big Sky Publishing. A biography from a peacekeeper's perspective, based on actual events in Timor during the historical 1999 referendum.

== See also ==
- United Nations Transitional Administration in East Timor
- United Nations Mission of Support to East Timor
- United Nations Integrated Mission in East Timor
