= 1999 East Timorese independence referendum =

1999 East Timor popular consultation
- 30 August 1999
- Do you accept the proposed special autonomy for East Timor within the Unitary State of the Republic of Indonesia?

Results
Choice	Votes	%
Accept	94,388	21.50%
Reject	344,580	78.50%
Valid votes	438,968	98.21%
Invalid or blank votes	7,985	1.79%
Total votes	446,953	100.00%
Registered voters/turnout	451,792	98.93%

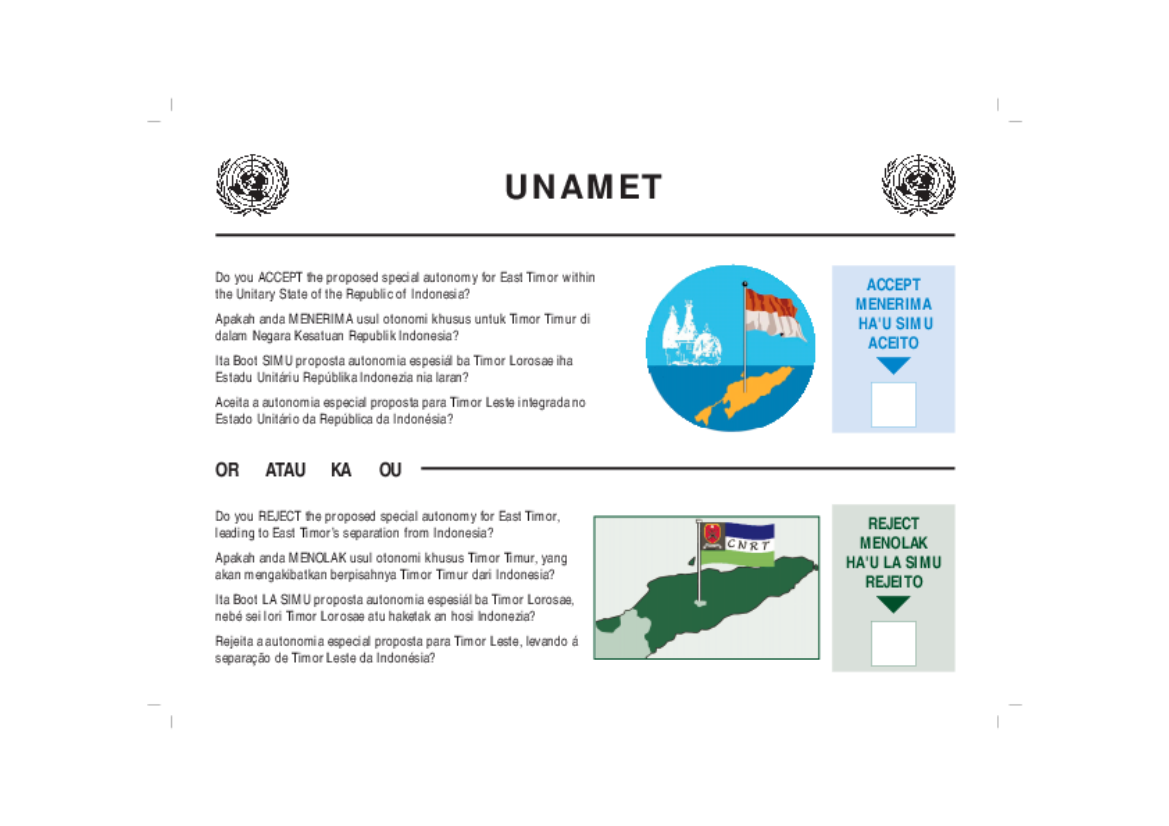
UNAMET ballot paper used in the 1999 East Timor independence referendum

An independence referendum was held in Indonesian-occupied East Timor on 30 August 1999, organised by United Nations Mission in East Timor. The referendum's origins lay with the request made by the President of Indonesia, B. J. Habibie, to the United Nations Secretary-General Kofi Annan on 27 January 1999, for the United Nations to hold a referendum, whereby East Timor would be given choice of either greater autonomy within Indonesia or independence.

Voters rejected the proposed special autonomy, leading to East Timor's separation from Indonesia. This led to mass violence and the destruction of infrastructure in East Timor, before the UN Security Council ratified the resolution on 15 September for the formation of a multinational force (INTERFET) to be immediately sent to East Timor to restore order and security and end the humanitarian crisis. East Timor would officially achieve recognised independence on 20 May 2002.

By many Indonesians (including the government), the referendum is also called the East Timorese people's consultation (Konsultasi rakyat Timor Timur), since the referendum required a People's Consultative Assembly (MPR) resolution to revoke its previous 1978 resolution if the majority of voters rejected the proposal.

== Background ==
Indonesia had initially invaded East Timor in December 1975, soon after the Revolutionary Front for an Independent East Timor (Fretilin), had declared the territory's independence. Indonesia annexed East Timor the following year, and under President Suharto, its occupation of the territory was often characterised by violence and brutality. Indonesian occupation and annexation of East Timor was not recognised by United Nations. Up until 1999, Indonesia was faced with constant pressure and criticism from the United Nations and the international community regarding its occupation of East Timor. The Dili massacre on 12 November 1991 increased international attention on the situation and further pressured Indonesia. More pressure on Indonesia followed when two East Timorese leaders - Bishop Carlos Ximenes Belo and José Ramos-Horta - received the Nobel Peace Prize in 1996.

B.J. Habibie succeeded Suharto in March 1998, and sought reform on the East Timor issue with international pressure mounting. Visiting diplomats from various countries such as Austria and the United Kingdom arrived in East Timor and in June 1998 affirmed that the East Timorese people should have the final decision regarding the region's commitment to Indonesia. In July, in the United States Senate, a resolution backed a United Nations led and supervised referendum for the East Timor to decide their attachment to Indonesia. On 24 July, President Habibie decreed a series of withdrawals of Indonesian forces from the region. East Timor youths from July to September 1998 conducted a free speech campaign that demonstrated to the "UN and the Indonesian government their rejection of autonomy and endorsement of an UN-supervised referendum."

The Indonesian government was going through a period of reform during this period. It had invested largely in East Timor and Habibie faced pressure to protect Indonesia's interests in the territory, particularly from Indonesia's security branches: Dephankam (Department of Defence and Security), Indonesian National Armed Forces (TNI) and Deplu (Ministry of Foreign Affairs). Hoping to have East Timor accepted by the international community as a legitimate part of Indonesia, on 27 January 1999, Habibie announced that East Timor would be permitted to vote on accepting "autonomy" within Indonesia. If special autonomy in Indonesia was not accepted, then East Timor would be allowed independence. Many international and East Timorese leaders, including the jailed resistance leader Xanana Gusmão, asked for a five-to-ten year transition period, recognising that a quick all or nothing ballot could prove disastrous.

In the preceding months, President Habibie had made various public statements whereby he mentioned that the costs of maintaining monetary subsidies to support the province were not balanced by any measurable benefit to Indonesia. Due to this unfavourable cost-benefit analysis, the most rational decision would be for the province, which was not part of the original 1945 boundaries of Indonesia, to be given democratic choice on whether they wanted to remain within Indonesia or not. This choice was also in line with Habibie's general democratisation program in the immediate post-Suharto period.

As the follow-up step to Habibie's request, the United Nations organised a meeting between the Indonesian government and the Portuguese government (as the previous colonial authority over East Timor). On 5 May 1999, these talks resulted in the "Agreement between the Republic of Indonesia and the Portuguese Republic on the Question of East Timor" which spelled out the details of the requested referendum. The referendum was to be held to determine whether East Timor would remain part of Indonesia, as a Special Autonomous Region, or separate from Indonesia. The referendum was organised and monitored by the United Nations Mission in East Timor (UNAMET) and 450,000 people were registered to vote including 13,000 outside East Timor.

The UN Consultation, which had been scheduled for 8 August 1999, was delayed until 30 August due to the deteriorating security circumstances created by Jakarta-backed militia violence.

== Proposed Special Autonomous Region of East Timor ==
Location of the proposed Special Autonomous Region of East Timor within Indonesia

The agreement between the Indonesian and Portuguese governments included a "Constitutional Framework for a special autonomy for East Timor" as an annexe. The framework would establish a Special Autonomous Region of East Timor (SARET), (Indonesian: Daerah Otonomi Khusus Timor Timur), within the unitary state of the Republic of Indonesia.

=== Competencies ===
The agreement between the Indonesian and Portuguese governments included a "Constitutional Framework for a special autonomy for East Timor" as an annexe.

Under the proposed framework, the Indonesian government would have retained control of defence, employment law, economic and fiscal policies and foreign relations, whilst Indonesian laws already in force would have continuity in the territory. The autonomous government would have had competence over all matters not reserved for the Government of Indonesia.

The autonomous region would have a coat of arms as a symbol of identity. The flag and national anthem of Indonesia would continue to be used within the region.

The regional government would be able to designate persons as having "East Timorese identity" and could limit rights of franchise and land ownership for persons without this identity. A person who was a legal resident of East Timor prior to December 1975, a person with at least one parent or grandparent being a legal resident of East Timor prior to December 1975 or a person who had resided in East Timor for at least 5 years prior to May 1999 would be deemed to have East Timorese Identity.

The SARET could enter into agreements with local and regional governments and international organisations for economic, cultural and educational purposes.

A team representing the SARET would have been entitled to participate in cultural and sporting events where other non-state entities are able to participate.

=== Institutions ===
The Constitutional Framework for a special autonomy for East Timor defined the legislative, executive and judicial organs of the autonomous region.

Legislative branch

The legislature of the SARET would have been a Regional Council of People's Representatives, which would be elected on the basis of universal suffrage by persons with East Timorese identity.

Executive branch

The executive branch would consist of a Regional Governor, appointed by the President of Indonesia on the advice of the SARET legislature, who would then nominate an advisory board (cabinet).

Judiciary

The SARET would have had an independent judiciary including Courts of First Instance, a Court of Appeal, a Court of Final Appeal and a Public Prosecutor's Office. A traditional civil code could also have been adopted.

Law enforcement

The SARET would have had its regional police force. Defence would remain the responsibility of the Indonesian National Armed Forces.

== Organisation ==
The United Nations Mission in East Timor (UNAMET) included the involvement of "240 international staff, 270 civilian police, 50 military liaison officers, 425 U.N. volunteers, and 668 local East Timorese staff for translation and driving," along with the additions of East Timorese people who were hired to help run the referendum. Special four wheel drive vehicles were flown into East Timor by the United Nations in order to cope with local conditions. All vehicles were fitted with radios which, together with 500 hand-held radios. The 5 May Agreement contained strict criteria on who could vote in the referendum. Those eligible to vote were defined as "persons born in East Timor", "persons born outside East Timor but with at least one parent having been born in East Timor", and "persons whose spouses fall under either of the two categories above". East Timorese living in exile overseas could also vote if they could get to polling centres in Portugal and Australia. In total, 200 registration centres were established in order to allow the East Timorese people to decide between the two options, which were either "Do you accept the proposed special autonomy for East Timor within the Unitary State of the Republic of Indonesia?" or "Do you reject the proposed special autonomy for East Timor, leading to East Timor's separation from Indonesia?".

== Campaign ==
The Indonesian government did not invest much time or resources in demonstrating to the people of East Timor the benefits of retaining its autonomy with the state. The months leading up to the referendum were characterised by intimidation and acts of violence committed by pro-integrationist militia groups. In March 1999, U.S. military intelligence noted "close ties" between the military and local militias, "many created by Indonesian Special Forces and Intelligence officers". It specifically mentioned "Wiranto's decision in early 1999 to provide hundreds of weapons to militia groups". The new Indonesian leader President Habibie prior to the vote, stressed the advantages of East Timor accepting special autonomy within Indonesia, referring to the importance of "national unity" and wanting the developmental effort in East Timor to continue onwards.

=== Ballot paper and logos ===
Logo used on ballot paper to indicate that voter accepts autonomy proposal

Logo used on ballot paper to indicate that voter rejects autonomy proposal

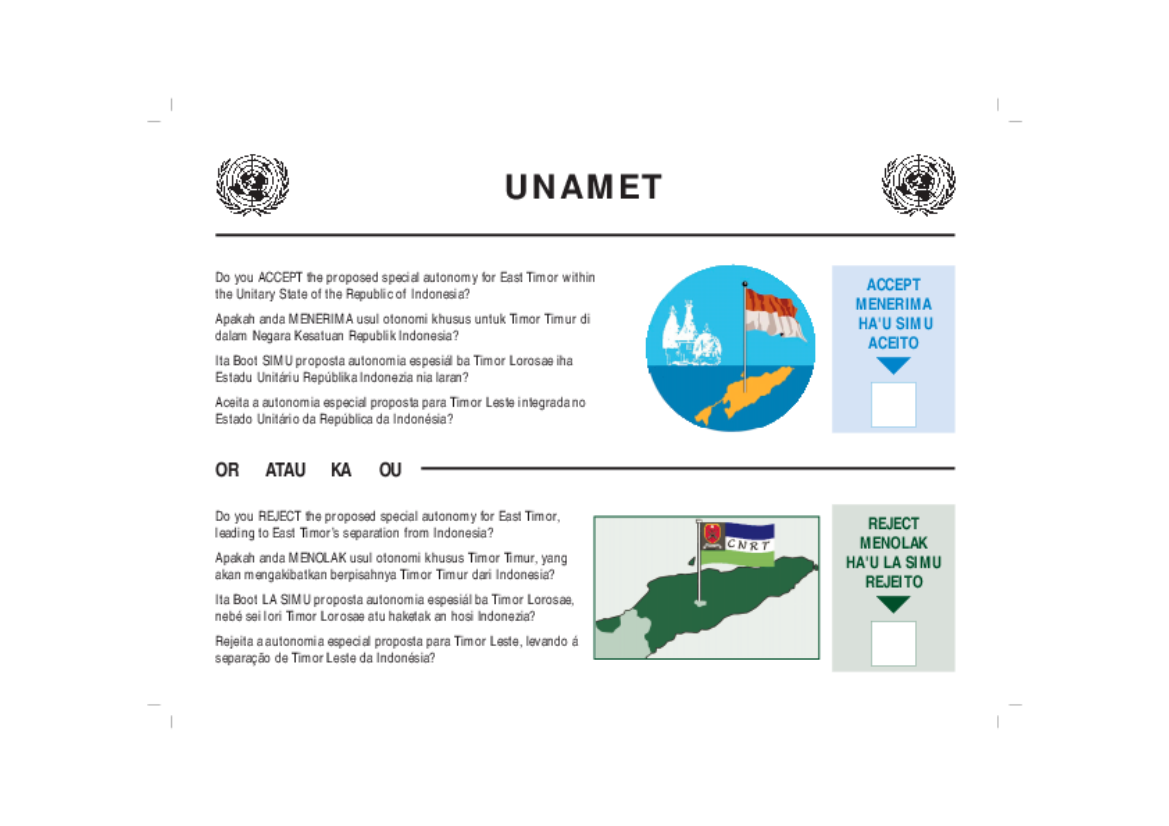
The ballot paper

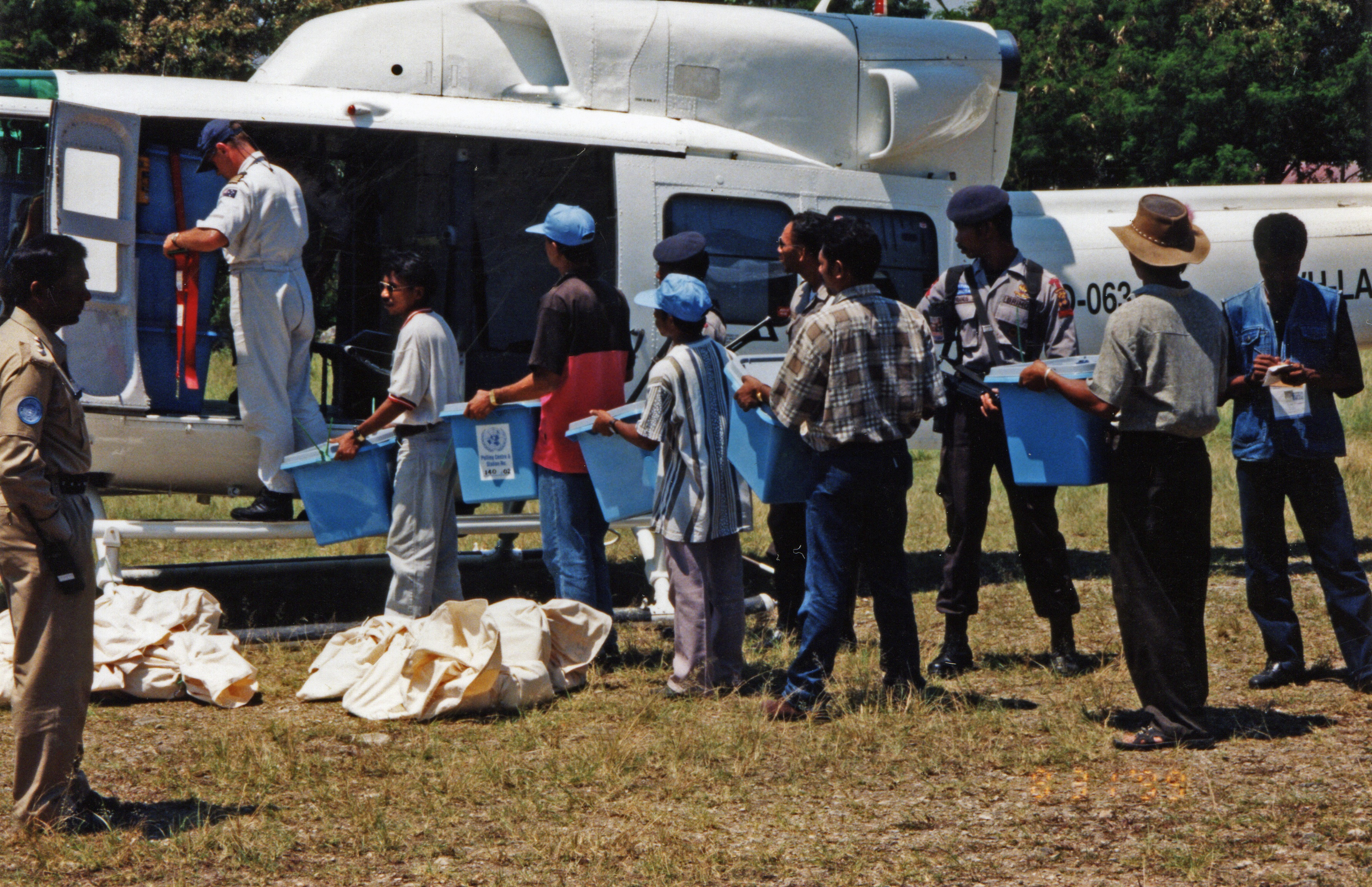
UN officials transporting the ballots

== Results ==
Voters were presented with the two following options:

Indonesian text	Tetum text	Portuguese text	English text
Apakah Anda menerima otonomi khusus untuk Timor Timur dalam Negara Kesatuan Republik Indonesia?	Ita Boot simu proposta autonomia espesiál ba Timor Lorosa'e iha Estadu Unitáriu Repúblika Indonezia nia laran?	Aceita a autonomia especial proposta para Timor Leste integrada no Estado Unitário da República da Indonésia?	Do you accept the proposed special autonomy for East Timor within the Unitary State of the Republic of Indonesia?
Apakah Anda menolak otonomi khusus yang diusulkan untuk Timor Timur, yang menyebabkan pemisahan Timor Timur dari Indonesia?	Ita Boot la simu proposta autonomia espesiál ba Timor Lorosa'e, nebé sei lori Timor Lorosa'e atu haketak an hosi Indonezia?	Rejeita a autonomia especial proposta para Timor Leste, levando à separação de Timor Leste da Indonésia?	Do you reject the proposed special autonomy for East Timor, leading to East Timor's separation from Indonesia?

Choice	Votes	%
Accept	94,388	21.50
Reject	344,580	78.50
Total	438,968	100.00
Valid votes	438,968	98.21
Invalid/blank votes	7,985	1.79
Total votes	446,953	100.00
Registered voters/turnout	451,792	98.93
Source: United Nations

== Reactions ==
The aftermath of the referendum results saw mass violence, killings and destruction targeted at the East Timorese. Mass violence was reported in the region and the enclave of Oecussi-Ambeno saw 1,000 men, women, and children reportedly murdered immediately after the referendum. The International Commission of Inquiry on East Timor, released by the U.N. Office of the High Commissioner for Human Rights in January 2000, established that the TNI and the militias of East Timor were complicit in the violence and destruction that took place, which was based on the testimonies of East Timor peoples as well as United Nations staff. It concluded that the post referendum violence "took the form of vengeance" and included "executions, gender violence ("women were targeted for sexual assault in a cruel and systematic way"), destruction of 60 to 80 percent of both public and private property, disruption of up to 70 percent of the health services, and the displacement and forcible relocation of thousands of people to West Timor". The report thus confirms how the militia initiated violence was conducted to create the illusion of a civil conflict between East Timorese, and how the Indonesian army was "responsible for the intimidation, terror, killings and other acts of violence" committed in East Timor throughout 1999. A multinational force was authorized by the UN Security Council on 15 September named InterFET, which was largely constituted by Australian Defence Force personnel under the command of Major-General Peter Cosgrove, to be deployed to East Timor to restore order and to establish and retain peace. When the UN returned to East Timor from 22 October after being forced to leave for genuine fear for its members, they found the territory destroyed with a population largely missing or terrified. "An estimated 80 percent of schools and clinics were destroyed, less than a third of the population remained in or near their homes, markets had been destroyed and transportation either stolen and taken across the border or burned, while telephone communications were nonexistent." Most of the trained professionals in East Timor happened to be Indonesian or Indonesia sympathisers, who largely left the territory after the results of the referendum.

The newly elected People's Consultative Assembly accepted the result on 19 October 1999 by issuing a resolution, TAP MPR No. V/MPR/1999, on the East Timorese referendum, repealing the previous TAP MPR No. VI/MPR/1978 that formally annexed East Timor to Indonesia. The United Nations passed a resolution establishing the United Nations Transitional Administration in East Timor (UNTAET) that would administer East Timor until independence in May 2002.

== Bibliography ==
- Fox, James J.; Babo Soares, Dionisio, eds. (2003). Out of the Ashes: Destruction and Reconstruction of East Timor (PDF). Canberra: ANU Press. doi:10.26530/oapen_459402. ISBN 9789751229083.
- Kingsbury, Damien; Leach, Michael (2007). East Timor: Beyond Independence. Clayton, Vic.: Monash University Press. ISBN 9781876924492.
- Nordquist, Kjell-Åke (1 January 2013). "Autonomy, Local Voices and Conflict Resolution: Lessons from East Timor". International Journal on Minority and Group Rights. 20 (1): 107–117. doi:10.1163/15718115-02001007. ISSN 1385-4879.
- Rabasa, Angel; Chalk, Peter (2001). Indonesia's Transformation and the Stability of Southeast Asia. Santa Monica, CA: Rand. ISBN 0833032402.
- Sebastian, Leonard C.; Smith, Anthony L. (2000). "The East Timor Crisis: A Test Case for Humanitarian Intervention". In Singh, Daljit (ed.). Southeast Asian Affairs 2000. Singapore: Institute of Southeast Asian Studies. pp. 64–84. doi:10.1355/9789812306906-006. ISBN 9812306900. ISSN 0377-5437. JSTOR 27912244.
- Stockings, Craig (2022). Born of Fire and Ash: Australian Operations in Response to the East Timor Crisis 1999-2000. The Official History of Australian Operations in Iraq & Afghanistan and Australian Peacekeeping Operations in East Timor, Volume I. Sydney: NewSouth Publishing. ISBN 9781742236230.
