= United Nations Security Council Resolution 384 =

UN Security Council Resolution 384
- East Timor
- Date: 22 December 1975
- Meeting no.: 1,869
- Code: S/RES/384 (Document)
- Subject: The situation in East Timor
- Voting summary: 15 voted for; None voted against; None abstained
- Result: Adopted

Security Council composition
- Permanent members: China; France; Soviet Union; United Kingdom; United States
- Non-permanent members: Byelorussian SSR; Cameroon; Costa Rica; Guyana; Iraq; Italy; Japan; Mauritania; Sweden; Tanzania

United Nations Security Council Resolution 384, adopted on 22 December 1975, noted statements from the representatives of Portugal, Indonesia and East Timor and recognized the right of the people of East Timor to self-determination and independence in accordance with the Charter. The Council expressed its grave concern with the deterioration of the situation in East Timor, deplored the intervention of the armed forces of Indonesia in that nation and expressed its regret that Portugal did not discharge fully its responsibilities as administering Power.

The Resolution then called upon all states to respect the territorial integrity of East Timor as well as the inalienable right of its people to self-determination and called upon the Government of Indonesia to withdraw all its forces from the territory without delay. The Council called on the Government of Portugal, as administering Power, to cooperate fully with the UN as well as urging all states and other parties to co-operate fully with the UN's efforts to achieve a peaceful solution to the situation and to facilitate the decolonization of the territory. The Resolution then requested that the Secretary-General urgently send a special representative to East Timor for the purpose of making an on-the-spot assessment of the existing situation and of establishing contact with all the parties in the Territory and to submit recommendation to the Council as soon as possible.

== See also ==
- History of East Timor
- List of United Nations Security Council Resolutions 301 to 400 (1971–1976)
