= Pirate Party UK election results =

The Pirate Party UK contested its first election in 2010, standing nine candidates in the 2010 general election. The party also stood candidates in the 2011 Oldham East and Saddleworth and 2012 Manchester Central by-elections. The party also contested several local government elections and the 2011 Scottish Parliament election. The party stood six candidates in the 2015 general election. The highest percentage of votes the party has achieved to date is 7.6% by David A Elston when he stood in the St Athan ward on Vale of Glamorgan Council during the 2017 local elections. In general elections, the party has never received more than one per cent of the vote but briefly had two co-opted community councillors in early 2017, David A Elston in St Athan Community Council, and Kev Young in Parton Parish Council.

== General election 2010 ==
The party stood nine candidates in the 2010 general election and received 1,340 votes overall, or about 0.35% of the total votes cast in those constituencies that had Pirate candidates:

Constituency	Candidate	Votes	%
Bethnal Green and Bow	Alexander van Terheyden	213	0.4
Bury North	Graeme Lambert	131	0.3
Cities of London and Westminster	Jack Nunn	90	0.2
Derby North	David Geraghty	170	0.4
Glasgow Central	Finlay Archibald	120	0.4
Leicester West	Shaun Dyer	113	0.3
Manchester, Gorton	Tim Dobson	236	0.6
South West Surrey	Luke Leighton	94	0.2
Worcester	Andrew Robinson	173	0.4
Total		1,340	0.35

Mark Sims intended to stand in East Ham but missed the deadline due to the air travel disruption after the 2010 Eyjafjallajökull eruption.

All candidates lost their deposits, with the best performance being 0.62% in Manchester Gorton.

== Elections in 2011 ==
=== Oldham East and Saddleworth by-election (2011) ===
The Pirate Party fielded Loz Kaye at the Oldham East and Saddleworth by-election in 2011, after Labour's victory in the 2010 election was declared void by the courts, and the incumbent Phil Woolas was removed. The result was 96 votes (0.3%).

=== Scottish and local elections 2011 ===
Pirate Party UK stood eight regional candidates in two regions in the Scottish Parliament election

Region	Candidates	Votes	%
Glasgow	1. Finlay Archibald; 2. Mark Wood; 3. Asmaa Hounat; 4. Stuart Murray	581	0.3
West of Scotland	1. Rob Harris; 2. Laura Riach; 3. Andrew Paliwoda; 4. Miah Gregory	850	0.3
Total		1,431	0.3

Graeme Lambert also stood in the local election in Bury gaining 3.62% of the vote.

== Elections in 2012 ==
=== Local elections 2012 ===
Pirate Party UK stood six candidates in three regions in the United Kingdom local elections. They received 551 votes, or 2.26% on average over the 6 wards in which they stood, the best results for the party in an election. In the Manchester Bradford ward the party leader, Loz Kaye, received 5.2% of the vote, the highest the party has achieved in any election to this date.

Constituency	Candidate	Votes	%
Edinburgh Meadows/Morningside	Phil Hunt	195	1.9
Glasgow Anderston	Rob Harris	46	0.2
Glasgow Govan	Finlay Archibald	51	0.2
Manchester Ancoats and Clayton	Tim Dobson	75	3
Manchester Bradford	Loz Kaye	127	5.2
Manchester City Centre	Maria Aretoulaki	57	3.1
Total		551	2.25

=== Manchester Central by-election (2012) ===
Loz Kaye was the Pirate Party's candidate in the Manchester Central by-election on 15 November 2012. He received 1.9% of the vote.

== European Parliament election 2014 ==
The Pirate Party announced its intentions to stand candidates in the North West England (European Parliament constituency) for the 2014 European Parliament election on 28 March 2014. Three Pirate Party UK candidates were nominated, Maria Aretoulaki, George Walkden and Jack Allnutt.

The party also adopted a 'common European election programme' in common with other European Pirate Parties, in addition to its existing policies.

The party received 8,957 votes, a 0.5% share in the North West England regional constituency.

== Elections in 2015 ==
=== General election 2015 ===
The party had six candidates in the 2015 general election. All the Pirate Party UK candidates standing for election were endorsed by Something New as candidates to vote for in constituencies where it was not standing candidates, with the exception of Mark Chapman due to Something New being in an alliance with a competitor to Chapman.

Constituency	Candidate	Votes	%
Bridgend	David A Elston	106	0.3
Manchester Central	Loz Kaye	346	0.8
Manchester Gorton	Cris Chesha	181	0.4
Salford and Eccles	Sam Clark	183	0.4
Sheffield Central	Andy Halsall	113	0.3
Vauxhall	Mark Chapman	201	0.4
Total		1,130	0.43

=== South Lanarkshire, Hamilton South local by-election ===
The Pirate Party UK's Governor of the Board, Andrew McCallum secured 13 votes, which is a 0.6% vote share.

== Elections in 2016 ==
=== Higher Blackley — Manchester local by-election 2016 ===
The Pirate Party UK's nominations officer, George Walkden stood in a Higher Blackley local by-election, securing 9 votes (0.6% vote share).

=== St Athan — Vale of Glamorgan Community Council co-option 2016 ===
Shortly after his resignation as deputy leader, the Pirate Party UK's first councillor, David A Elston, joined the St Athan Community Council on 1 March 2016 (St David's Day).

=== Local elections 2016 ===
Andreas Habeland stood in the Church Street Westminster local council 2016 election and secured 26 (0.8%) votes.

=== Rhoose — Vale of Glamorgan local by-election 2016 ===
James Fyfe stood in the Rhoose ward for a seat on the Vale of Glamorgan county council on 30 June 2016 and secured 4 (0.2%) votes.

=== Parton Parish Council co-option 2016 ===
Kev Young, Independent, joined the Pirate Party UK, stood down and was co-opted back on to the council, which provided the Pirate Party UK with its second councillor and first council chairperson. He subsequently resigned from the party in early 2017.

== Elections in 2017 ==
=== Local elections 2017 ===
Constituency	Candidate	Votes	%
Castleland	Nathaniel "Jebediah" Hedges	35	1.5
New Milton	Desmond Hjerling	108	2.2
St Athan	David A Elston	75	7.6
Total		218	3.8

Elston and Hedges also stood on a town council level. For Flemingston and Eglwys Brewis on the St Athan Community Council where Elston had 125 votes (17.4%) losing his community council seat by less than 50 votes to Labour and Hedges had 41 (1.9%) votes in Castleland on the Barry Town Council, the average vote share being 9.7%.

=== General election 2017 ===
The Pirate Party stood ten candidates in the 2017 general election, the highest number in the party's history.

Constituency	Candidate	Votes	%
Bournemouth West	Jason Halsey	418	0.9
Cardiff South	Jeb Hedges	170	0.3
Eddisbury	Morgan Hill	179	0.3
Gower	Jason Winstanley	149	0.3
Manchester Central	Neil Blackburn	192	0.4
New Forest West	Des Hjerling	483	1.0
Norwich North	Liam Matthews	340	0.7
Sheffield Central	Robert Moran	91	0.2
Vale of Glamorgan	David Elston	127	0.2
Vauxhall	Mark Chapman	172	0.3
Total		2,321	0.46

== Elections in 2018 ==
=== Local elections 2018 ===
Constituency	Candidate	Votes	%
Batley West	Garry Kitchin	64	1.45
Vassall	Mark Chapman	127	1.19
Total		191	

== Elections in 2019 ==
=== Local elections 2019 ===
Constituency	Candidate	Votes	%
Frimley Green	Gavin TP Crump	190	3.7%

== Elections in 2025 ==
=== Abermaw local by-election 2025 ===
Constituency	Candidate	Votes	%
Abermaw	Chris Green	11	1.8%

== Elections in 2026 ==
=== Local elections 2026 ===
Constituency	Candidate	Votes	%
Burgess Hill North	Nathan Griffiths	58	1.2%
