= Manchester Central by-election =

There have been two by-elections for the Manchester Central constituency of the British House of Commons:

- 1979 Manchester Central by-election, won by Labour Party candidate Bob Litherland
- 2012 Manchester Central by-election, won by Labour Party candidate Lucy Powell
