= Lucy Powell =

British politician (born 1974)

The Right Honourable Lucy Powell MP
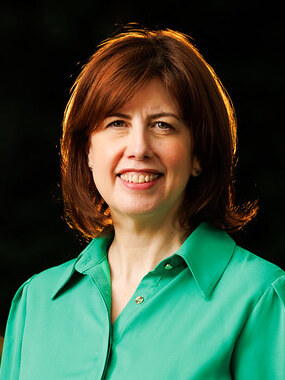
- Official portrait, 2026

Secretary of State for Education
- Incumbent
- Assumed office 20 July 2026
- Prime Minister: Andy Burnham
- Preceded by: Bridget Phillipson

Deputy Leader of the Labour Party
- Incumbent
- Assumed office 25 October 2025
- Leader: Keir Starmer; Andy Burnham
- Preceded by: Angela Rayner (Note: Office vacant from September to October 2025.)

Leader of the House of Commons Lord President of the Council
- In office 5 July 2024 – 5 September 2025
- Prime Minister: Keir Starmer
- Preceded by: Penny Mordaunt
- Succeeded by: Alan Campbell

Chair of the Commons Modernisation Committee
- In office 9 September 2024 – 5 September 2025
- Preceded by: Office established
- Succeeded by: Alan Campbell
Shadow portfolios
Shadow Leader of the House of Commons
In office 4 September 2023 – 5 July 2024
Leader	Keir Starmer
Preceded by	Thangam Debbonaire
Succeeded by	Chris Philp
Shadow Secretary of State for Digital, Culture, Media and Sport
In office 29 November 2021 – 4 September 2023
Leader	Keir Starmer
Preceded by	Jo Stevens
Succeeded by	Thangam Debbonaire
Shadow Secretary of State for Housing
In office 9 May 2021 – 29 November 2021
Leader	Keir Starmer
Preceded by	Thangam Debbonaire
Succeeded by	Lisa Nandy (Levelling Up, Housing and Communities)
Shadow Secretary of State for Education
In office 13 September 2015 – 27 June 2016
Leader	Jeremy Corbyn
Preceded by	Tristram Hunt
Succeeded by	Pat Glass
Shadow Minister for Business and Consumers
In office 6 April 2020 – 9 May 2021
Leader	Keir Starmer
Preceded by	Bill Esterson
Succeeded by	Seema Malhotra
Shadow Minister for the Cabinet Office
In office 5 November 2014 – 14 September 2015
Leader	Ed Miliband
Preceded by	Michael Dugher
Succeeded by	Tom Watson
Shadow Minister for Childcare and Early Years
In office 7 October 2013 – 5 November 2014
Leader	Ed Miliband
Preceded by	Sharon Hodgson
Succeeded by	Alison McGovern

Member of Parliament for Manchester Central
- Incumbent
- Assumed office 15 November 2012
- Preceded by: Tony Lloyd
- Majority: 13,797 (34.7%)

Personal details
- Born: Lucy Maria Powell; 10 October 1974 (age 52) Manchester, England
- Party: Labour Co-op
- Spouse: James Williamson (m. 2009)
- Children: 2
- Education: King's College London (BSc)
- Website: Official website

Lucy Maria Powell (born 10 October 1974) is a British politician who has served as Secretary of State for Education since 2026 and as Deputy Leader of the Labour Party since 2025. She served as Leader of the House of Commons and Lord President of the Council from July 2024 to September 2025. She has been the Member of Parliament (MP) for Manchester Central since 2012. Powell has been described as belonging to the soft left of the Labour Party.

Born in Manchester, Powell attended Parrs Wood High School. She went on to study at Somerville College, Oxford for one year then King's College London, before working in campaigning and PR roles for Britain in Europe, NESTA and the Labour Party. Powell was elected to the House of Commons at the 2012 Manchester Central by-election as MP for Manchester Central. She was re-elected at the 2015 UK general election and campaigned to remain in the European Union (EU) in the 2016 Brexit referendum. She was re-elected in both the 2017 and 2019 general elections.

Powell held several shadow cabinet roles under both Ed Miliband and Jeremy Corbyn, and was vice-chair of the 2015 election campaign for the former. Having left Corbyn's frontbench team during the 2016 British shadow cabinet resignations, she rejoined the Starmer shadow cabinet in 2020, holding portfolios in business, housing and culture. In the 2023 British shadow cabinet reshuffle, she was appointed as Shadow Leader of the House of Commons. Following Labour's victory in the 2024 UK general election, Powell was appointed Leader of the House of Commons and Lord President of the Council in the first Starmer cabinet. She was removed from the government as a part of the 2025 British cabinet reshuffle and returned to the backbenches.

Following the resignation of Angela Rayner, Powell put her name forward as a candidate for the deputy leadership of the Labour Party on 9 September 2025. She defeated Bridget Phillipson on 25 October 2025, holding the position of Deputy Leader for the remainder of Starmer's leadership and subsequently under Andy Burnham. She returned to Cabinet under Burnham as Education Secretary in July 2026.

== Early life and education ==
Lucy Powell was born in Moss Side, Manchester. She attended Beaver Road Primary School and Parrs Wood High School in Didsbury, and then studied A-levels at Xaverian College. She studied chemistry at Somerville College, Oxford, having been one of several pupils in her year at Xaverian to receive an offer to the University of Oxford although she subsequently claimed otherwise. However, she left Oxford after one year and transferred in to the second year of the chemistry degree at King's College London.

== Career ==
Powell began her career working as a parliamentary assistant for Beverley Hughes, after having worked at the Labour Party Headquarters in Millbank Tower during the 1997 general election campaign. She joined the pro-euro and pro-EU Treaty pressure group Britain in Europe (BiE), originally in a public relations role and later as head of regional campaigning. She replaced Simon Buckby as Campaign Director of BiE. In this capacity, she worked with Chris Patten, Neil Kinnock, Nick Clegg and Danny Alexander.

After BiE was wound down in June 2005 because of the referendum "No" votes in France and the Netherlands, she worked for the non-departmental public body or quango NESTA (the National Endowment for Science, Technology and the Arts), initially in a public affairs role and later to establish and manage the Manchester Innovation Fund project. From May 2010 to September 2010, Powell managed Ed Miliband's successful campaign for the 2010 Labour Party leadership election. She then was Ed Miliband's acting and later deputy chief of staff from September 2010 to April 2012.

== Parliamentary career ==
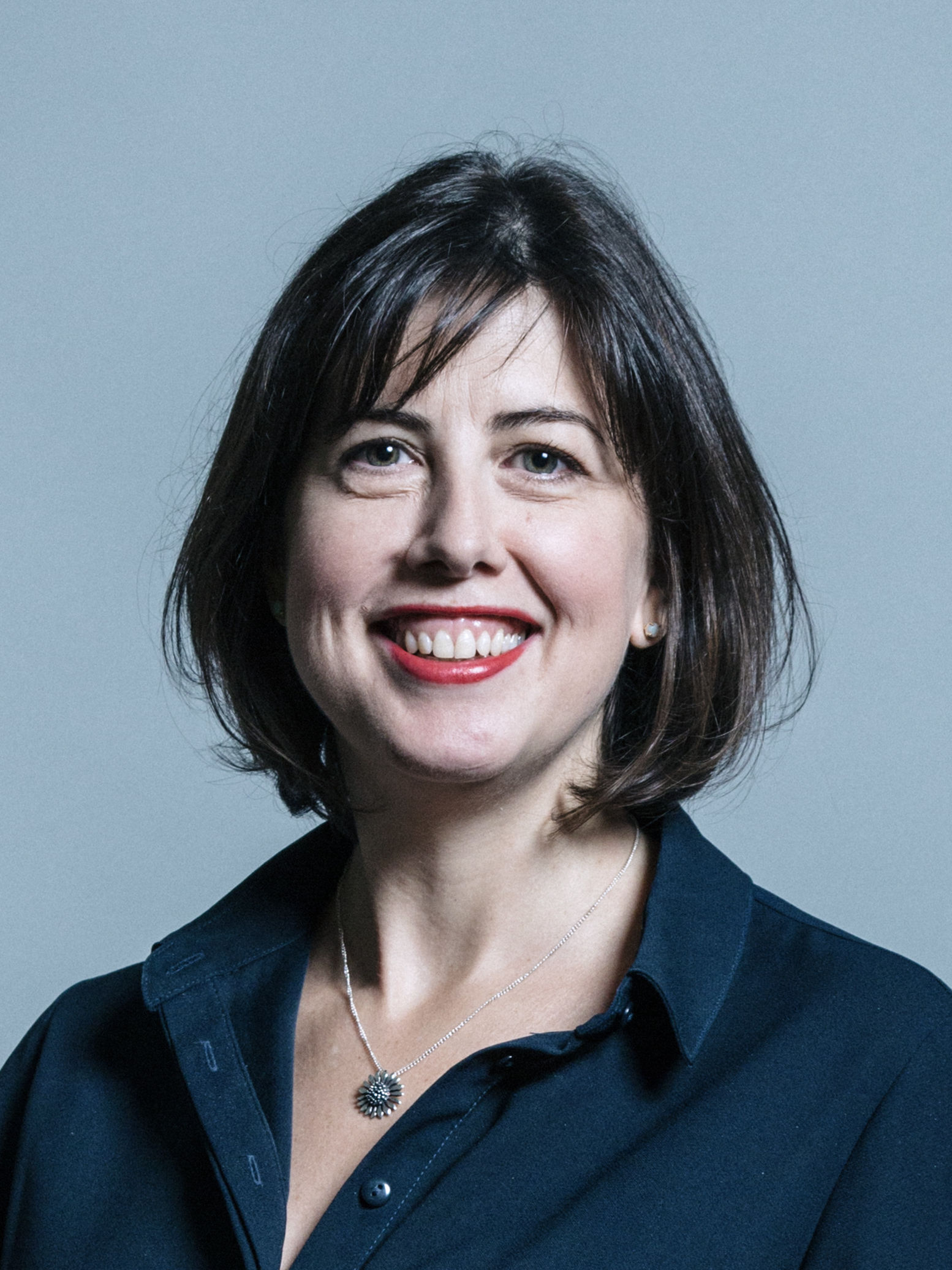
Official MP portrait, 2017

=== Early opposition career (2010–2016) ===
Powell was selected as Labour's prospective parliamentary candidate for Manchester Withington in April 2007. At the 2010 UK general election, she stood in Manchester Withington, coming second with 40.5% of the vote behind the incumbent Liberal Democrat MP John Leech. Powell was elected as MP for Manchester Central at the 2012 Manchester Central by-election, winning the election with 69.1% of the vote and a majority of 9,936 votes. Powell first joined the opposition frontbench in October 2013 as Shadow Childcare and Early Years Minister, and entered the Miliband shadow cabinet in November 2014 as Shadow Minister for the Cabinet Office.

Powell was appointed vice-chair of the 2015 UK general election campaign by Ed Miliband, in which Labour suffered a net loss of 26 seats, including a net loss of 40 seats in Scotland. She was heavily criticised for apparently suggesting that Labour's election pledges were liable to be broken: in talking about the EdStone, she commented: "I don't think anyone is suggesting that the fact that he's carved them into stone means that he is absolutely not going to break them or anything like that." She said that she had been quoted out of context. She was responsible for Ed Miliband's interview with Russell Brand, described as a PR blunder. As a result of these actions coupled to the result, Tanya Gold, writing for The Sunday Times, described her as "discredited". In response to the result, Powell stated, "I bear my share of responsibility in this".

Powell was re-elected as MP for Manchester Central at the 2015 general election with a decreased vote share of 61.3% and an increased majority of 21,639. In the subsequent 2015 Labour Party leadership election, she nominated Andy Burnham. On 13 September 2015, Powell was appointed as Shadow Education Secretary by Jeremy Corbyn, succeeding Tristram Hunt. As Shadow Education Secretary, she argued for bringing free schools and academies under Local Education Authority control.

=== Opposition backbencher (2016–2020) ===
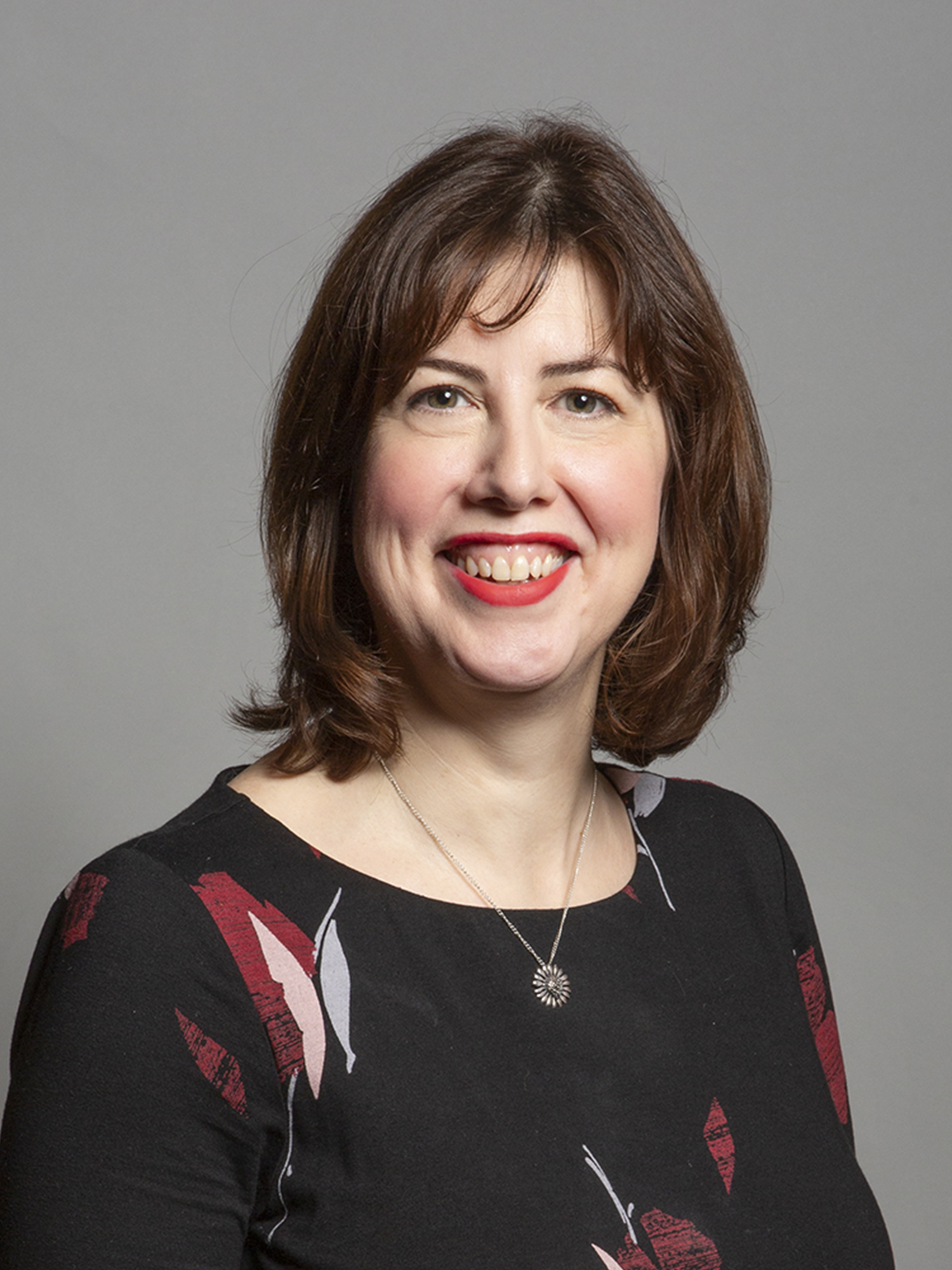
Official MP portrait, 2019

Powell resigned from the Shadow Cabinet on 26 June 2016, along with dozens of shadow cabinet colleagues unhappy with Corbyn's leadership. She supported Owen Smith in the 2016 Labour leadership election. At the snap 2017 UK general election, Powell was again re-elected, with an increased vote share of 77.4% and an increased majority of 31,445. Upon receiving the exit poll for the results of election, Powell's reaction had been one of surprise and disbelief as polls indicated a hung parliament, suggesting that Labour had performed much better than anticipated. Footage from that night shows her gasping in astonishment at the results. The day after the election she stated that, "We did get it wrong on Jeremy Corbyn. I'm really glad that we got it wrong."

During her period on the backbenches, Powell focused on issues including online harms and digital regulation, co-founding the All-Party Parliamentary Group on Social Media and calling for stronger safeguards against harmful content and misinformation. She also introduced a Private Member's Bill on online hate speech, proposing tighter controls on tech companies' responsibilities for harmful content. Powell took an interest in housing and local government, campaigning on cladding and building safety issues after the Grenfell Tower fire, and raising concerns about urban regeneration projects in Manchester. She also sat on the Commons Science and Technology Committee, contributing to inquiries into data use, digital policy, and the impact of automation.

In September 2017, the political commentator Iain Dale placed Powell at Number 81 in The 100 Most Influential People on the Left. At the 2019 UK general election, Powell was again re-elected, with a decreased vote share of 70.4% and a decreased majority of 29,089. Powell endorsed Keir Starmer in the 2020 Labour Party leadership election.

=== Return to the opposition frontbench (2020–2024) ===
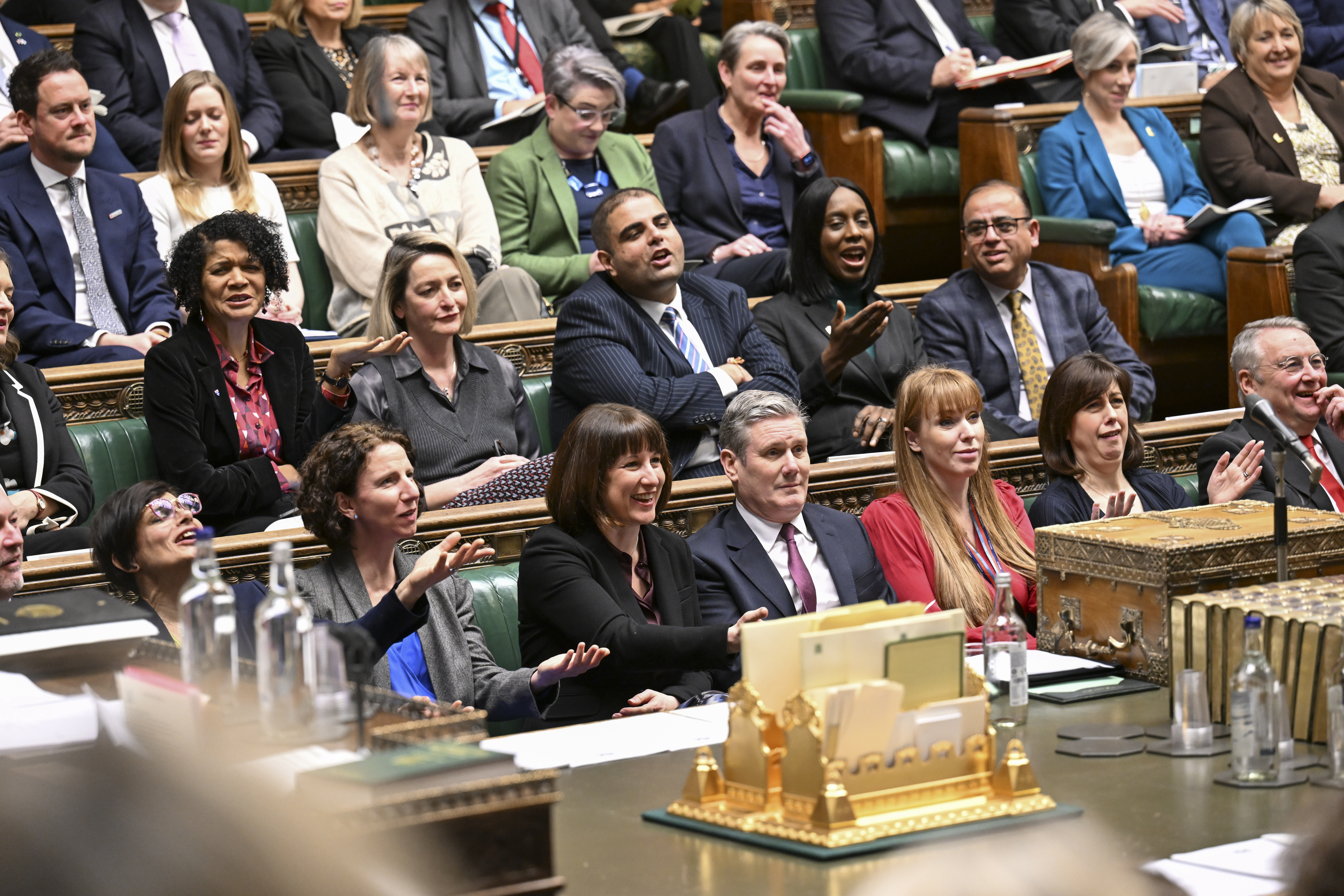
Powell on the frontbench of the Shadow Cabinet of Keir Starmer in February 2024.

On 9 April 2020, Powell rejoined the Labour frontbench when she was appointed as the Shadow Minister for Business and Consumers by new party leader Keir Starmer. In the May 2021 shadow cabinet reshuffle, she was promoted to the Shadow Cabinet as the Shadow Secretary of State for Housing, succeeding Thangam Debbonaire. During her tenure, she set out Labour's housing priorities at the party conference, including plans to expand the construction of council and social housing, establish a Building Works Agency to oversee building safety, and reform compulsory purchase rules to enable local authorities to acquire land for development. She also argued that housing policy should prioritise affordability and security rather than investment value.

In the November 2021 shadow cabinet reshuffle, Powell was appointed Shadow Secretary of State for Digital, Culture, Media and Sport. Whilst in this post, Powell described herself as a "tech optimist". In the role, she criticised the government's handling of the BBC licence fee settlement and argued for the corporation's long-term financial stability. She opposed privatisation of Channel 4, describing it as a commercially successful public asset whose sale would harm the independent production sector. Powell also supported measures to strengthen protections for the creative industries, advocated reforms to online safety regulation, and promoted greater access to cultural education.

In the 2023 British shadow cabinet reshuffle, Powell was appointed Shadow Leader of the House of Commons in a direct job swap with Thangam Debbonaire. In her role, she actively promoted improvements to parliamentary standards and conduct. She advocated strengthening sanctions against misconduct, notably in response to proposals to exclude MPs arrested on suspicion of violent or sexual offences, and criticised attempts to curtail the Standards Committee's powers following the Owen Paterson lobbying scandal. Powell also proposed the launching of major initiatives to modernise Parliament, including the establishment of inquiries into access, family-friendly working practices and simplified parliamentary language, and advancing reforms on second jobs and cultural behaviour standards.

In February 2024, Powell was centrally involved in the Gaza ceasefire vote controversy. When the Speaker of the House of Commons departed from precedent by allowing Labour's amendment to be voted on – and passed – unopposed after the government withdrew its amendment, Powell defended Labour's advocacy for a more representative debate and urged broader humility among MPs. She described the episode as a "humiliation of vanity" and offered an "olive branch" to restore parliamentary trust and functionality. At the 2024 UK general election, Powell was again re-elected, but with a lower vote share of 50.8% and a smaller majority of 13,797.

=== Leader of the House of Commons (2024–2025) ===
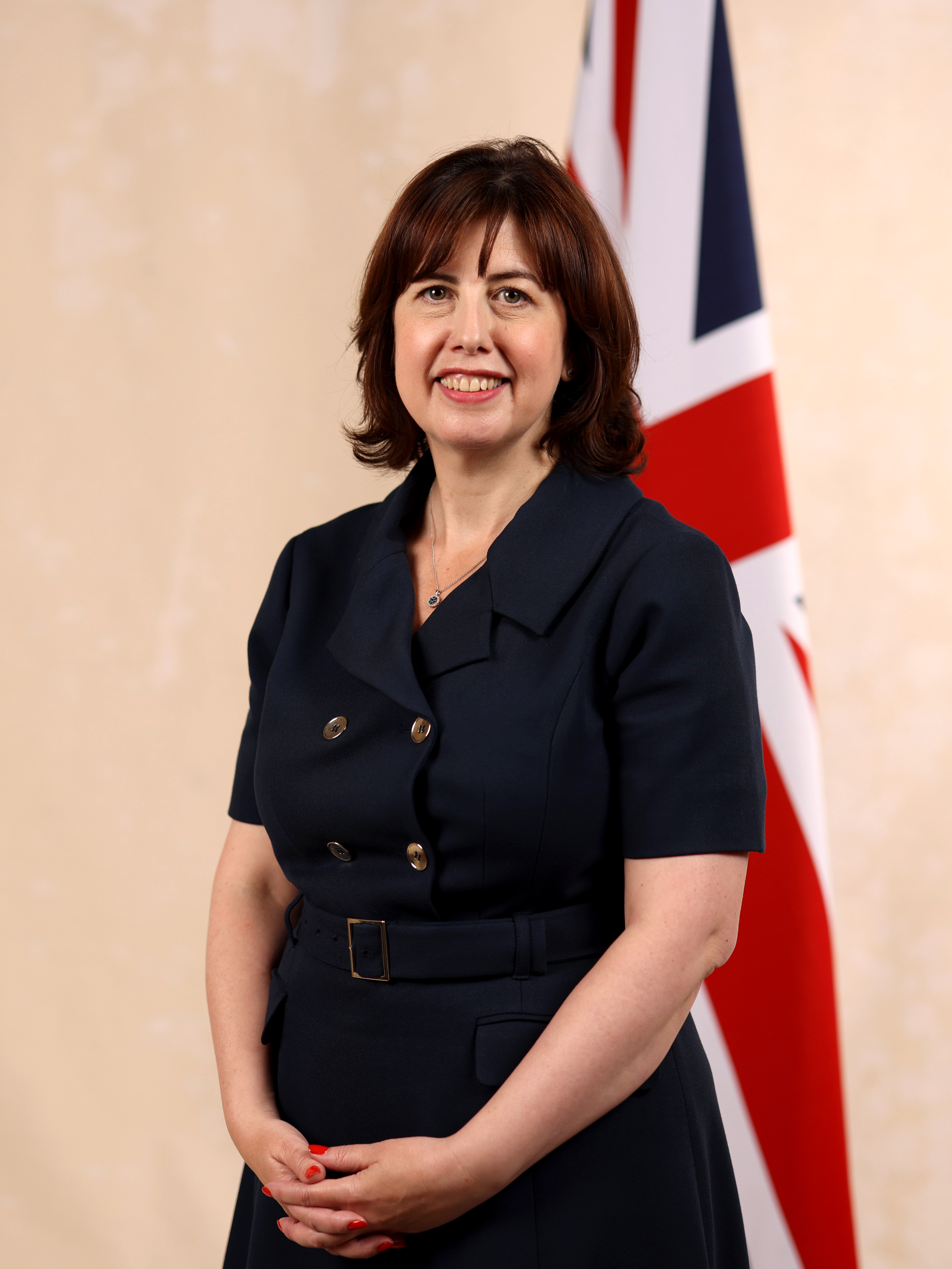
Official cabinet portrait, 2024

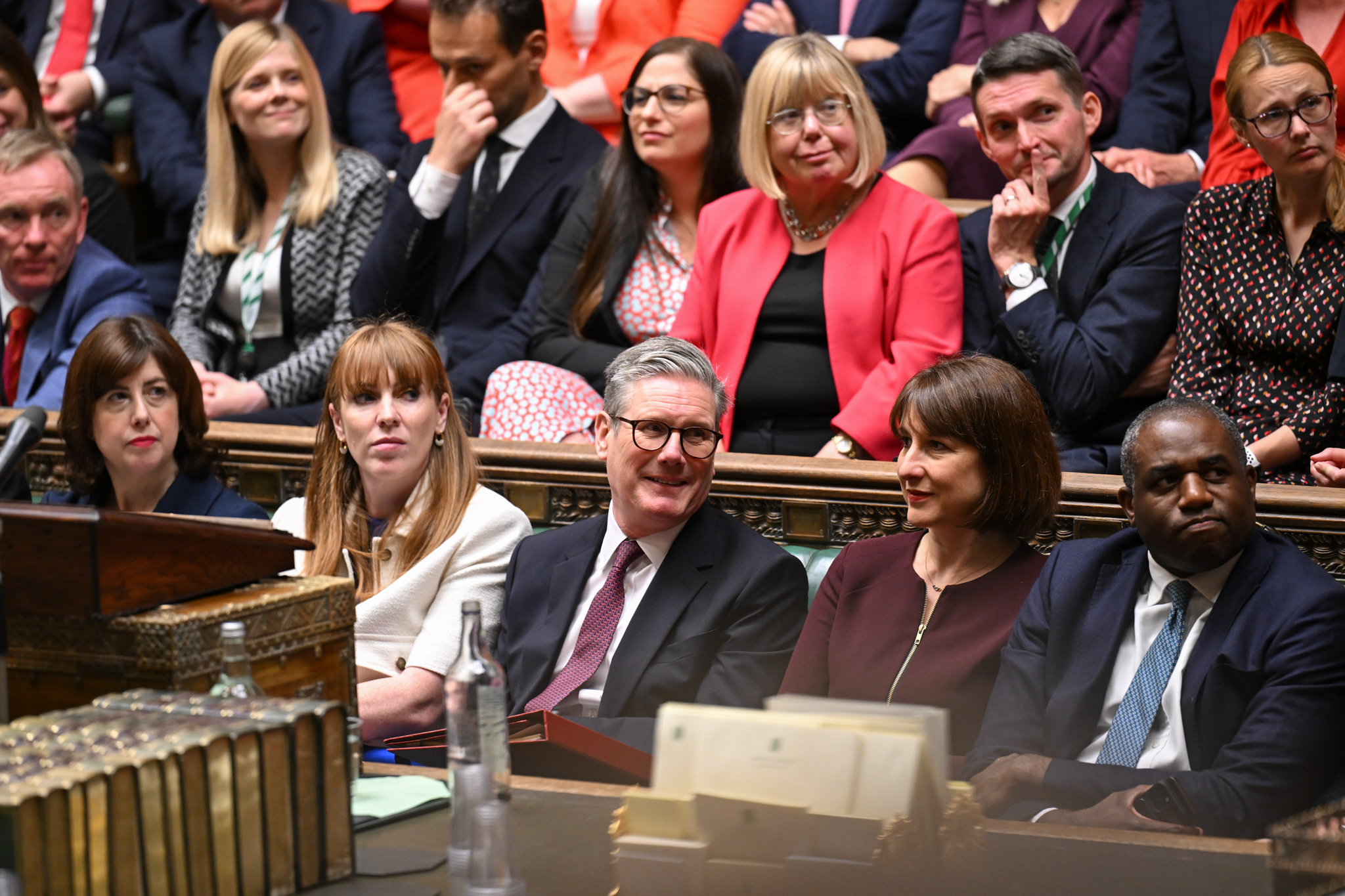
Powell (pictured on the left) on the frontbench of the Starmer Ministry on 17 July 2024.

After the Labour Party's victory in the 2024 general election, Powell was appointed the Leader of the House of Commons and Lord President of the Council by the new Prime Minister Keir Starmer on 5 July. Upon Labour's return to government, Powell played an important role in developing the government's legislative agenda for the King's speech delivered on 17 July 2024, which outlined 39 proposed bills with emphases on economic growth, housing, employment rights, and constitutional reforms.

On 25 July 2024, she secured parliamentary approval to re-establish the Commons Modernisation Committee, which had been abolished under the previous Conservative government. As Leader of the Commons, she concurrently was chair of the committee and oversaw its remit to review parliamentary procedure, standards, and workplace culture. During her tenure, Powell introduced reforms limiting MPs from holding paid consultancy and advisory roles, and expanded induction and standards training for newly elected members. She supported improved accessibility for disabled MPs through wider use of call lists, and initiated cross-party discussions on the potential adoption of electronic voting to reduce the length of divisions. In March 2025, Powell organised the first official photograph of all 263 women MPs elected in 2024 to mark the highest female representation in Commons history. She also advised against the closure of parliamentary social facilities on security grounds, and stated her opposition to proposals to criminalise lying in public office, citing existing parliamentary sanctions as sufficient.

On 20 March 2025, Powell launched an inquiry into improving physical and procedural accessibility within Parliament, soliciting evidence on short- and medium-term adaptations to the parliamentary estate and simplifying the language used in proceedings so they are more comprehensible to both members and the public. She emphasised the importance of measures such as proxy voting extensions—covering fertility treatment, baby leave, and pregnancy complications—as part of efforts to make parliamentary participation more family-friendly and flexible. In line with this, she oversaw formal motions amending the Guide to the Rules to restrict paid consultancy and advisory work for MPs, reinforcing ethics and weakening potential conflicts of interest in early rulings of the committee's term. In September 2024, Powell warned there could have been a "run on the pound" if the government had not made urgent spending cuts in July, including severe limitations to pensioner Winter Fuel Payments which received heavy criticism. The Financial Times reported that several financial experts had refuted this claim, including Ben Zaranko from the Institute for Fiscal Studies, who said this suggestion was "silly".

In May 2025, Powell described discussion of rape gangs as a "dog whistle", which was condemned by survivors of the abuse. Reform UK called her comments "abhorrent" and asked the Prime Minister to consider sacking Powell, while the Conservatives called on her to resign. She subsequently apologised and received the full backing of the Prime Minister's Office. On 5 September 2025, Powell was dismissed from her position as Leader of the House of Commons as part of a cabinet reshuffle following the resignation of then Deputy Prime Minister Angela Rayner. Powell was reported to have been unhappy with her dismissal by Starmer. A Labour source stated that "she was heads and shoulders above" some colleagues who were retained and that, during her time in government, she was also reported to have had disagreements with Morgan McSweeney, the Prime Minister's Chief of Staff. Her removal, along with that of several other ministers from the North West of England, reportedly raised concerns within the party about regional representation in the government.

=== Deputy Labour Leader (2025–present) ===
Following her dismissal as Leader of the Commons, Andy Burnham, the incumbent Mayor of Greater Manchester, endorsed a prospective campaign of Powell in the 2025 Labour Party deputy leadership election, expressing his dissatisfaction with her removal from the government. Powell later confirmed she was thinking about standing after being encouraged by colleagues. She was an early front-runner in the contest to replace Rayner, with Labour MPs reportedly "coalescing" around her to enter the contest. On 9 September 2025, Powell confirmed her candidacy in the election, platforming her campaign on "uniting" the party's "broad voter coalition" and "championing" backbenchers. The deputy leadership race established Powell as the direct challenger to front-runner Bridget Phillipson, with former Labour MP Tom Blenkinsop describing the race as "a proxy war between Keir Starmer and Andy Burnham". Her campaign also saw backing from the Tribune Group of soft-left Labour MPs. On 11 September 2025, fellow candidate Paula Barker withdrew from the leadership race, pledging to nominate Powell's campaign instead.

After nominations closed, Powell secured the support of 119 Labour MPs, while Bridget Phillipson received 177; both figures exceeded the 20% parliamentary threshold required to progress to the members' ballot. At the close of constituency labour party (CLP) and affiliate nominations, Powell had been nominated by 221 CLPs to Phillipson's 140, and she secured the required backing from affiliated organisations. Powell's campaign won formal endorsement from a number of affiliated organisations, including the trade unions ASLEF, the Communication Workers Union (CWU) and the Fire Brigades Union (FBU), and from socialist society Disability Labour. Her campaign was also reported to have received backing from the soft-left Tribune Group of MPs and the Mainstream grouping of MPs. Powell also received support from senior Labour figures inside the cabinet, including Lisa Nandy and Ed Miliband, as well as former Labour leader Neil Kinnock and former cabinet minister Louise Haigh.

Throughout the contest, Powell presented herself as an independent voice for members and backbenchers, arguing that the deputy leader should act as a "shop-steward" for activists and focus on member engagement; she said she would treat the role as a full-time post rather than combine it with ministerial office. Powell rejected characterisations of her campaign as a proxy for external figures and sought to broaden her appeal across the party. The campaign included a series of hustings: candidates took part in PLP hustings in mid-September and at Labour Party Conference hustings where Powell and Phillipson set out contrasting visions for the deputy role. Powell's campaign emphasised unity, internal reform and greater member engagement. She described herself as an "independent voice for members and backbenchers" and argued that the deputy leader should act as a link between the parliamentary party and the wider membership. Drawing on her experience as Leader of the House of Commons, Powell said the role should be primarily political rather than governmental, and suggested that being outside the cabinet—and therefore not subject to collective ministerial responsibility—would allow her to "speak truth" to senior leadership and represent members' and backbenchers' concerns. She stated that, if elected, she would be a full-time deputy leader rather than combining the role with ministerial office, arguing that the position should focus on party organisation and member engagement.

On 25 October 2025, it was announced that Powell had received 87,407 votes, a majority of almost 14,000 on a turnout of 16.6%, becoming the party's deputy leader, winning the election with 54% of the vote. Prior to the November 2025 United Kingdom budget, Powell urged the Chancellor of the Exchequer, Rachel Reeves, to uphold the government's manifesto commitments not to raise National Insurance, VAT, or income tax. She also called for the complete removal of the two-child benefit cap, arguing that doing so was essential to achieving a substantial reduction in child poverty over the course of the Parliament. In January 2026, Powell was reported to have been the only member of Labour's National Executive Committee to vote in favour of allowing Andy Burnham to stand as the party's candidate in the 2026 Gorton and Denton by-election, with eight members voting against and NEC Chair, Shabana Mahmood abstaining. Following the decision to block Burnham's candidacy, Powell urged party unity in the face of the rising electoral challenge from Reform UK, describing the party as the "poison and cancer" that needed to be defeated in by-election. When questioned about the comments, Cabinet minister, Liz Kendall, declined to repeat Powell's language about Reform UK, distancing herself from describing the party in such terms while affirming the need to challenge its policies politically.

In February 2026, during a period of internal political difficulty for Starmer, Powell publicly expressed her support for his leadership, calling for unity within the parliamentary party and suggesting he had agreed to be more "inclusive and collaborative". Also in February 2026, Powell criticised the student loan repayment system, focusing in particular on the high interest rates applied to Plan 2 loans, which she described as "unfair" and "egregious". She argued that the structure of repayments left many graduates facing what she characterised as an "endless" burden, while acknowledging that substantial reform would carry significant fiscal implications for the government. Her intervention came after Rachel Reeves defended the existing system as "fair" in response to protests organised by the National Union of Students.

On 12 February 2026, Powell spoke at the Unison annual women's conference in Liverpool, highlighting the Labour government's achievements, such as expanding free school meals, raising living wages, ending zero-hours contracts, and lifting the two-child benefit cap, while warning against the rise of Reform UK and right-wing political threats. She called Labour's relationship with trade unions "our collective superpower".

Amid the 2026 Labour Party leadership crisis, Powell repeatedly defended Andy Burnham as a potential future leader while declining to call publicly for a change of leadership. During media appearances in June 2026, she described Ed Miliband as someone who would make "a good Chancellor" in a Burnham administration, although she criticised what she called "tittle-tattle" over cabinet appointments.

In July 2026, Powell criticised what she described as a "boys' club" culture of anonymous briefing within 10 Downing Street, arguing that the next Labour leader should promote a more meritocratic and inclusive culture and warning against sexist briefings targeting female Labour politicians.

==== Education Secretary (2026–present) ====
On 20 July 2026, Andy Burnham appointed Powell as Secretary of State for Education, succeeding Bridget Phillipson. She subsequently criticised the education reforms introduced under former Conservative education secretary Michael Gove, describing their emphasis on academic subjects and examinations as a "straitjacket" which had failed to cater for pupils with different talents. She announced plans to expand technical and vocational education and review the curriculum and assessment system, including the pressure created by GCSE examinations. Powell also made reform of the student loan system a priority.

== Political views ==
Powell has been described as part of the soft left of the Labour Party, and is a member of the Tribune Group of Labour MPs and the Fabian Society. She is also a member of Labour Friends of Israel. In a 2024 interview, she cited Neil Kinnock, Mo Mowlam, Harriet Harman, and Ed Miliband as her political influences. Powell campaigned for the UK to remain in the European Union (EU) in the 2016 Brexit referendum and advocated for a "Common Market 2.0", a soft Brexit model involving single-market and customs union alignment, designed to maintain close economic relations while respecting parliamentary sovereignty. Powell consistently supported measures maintaining close ties to the EU, including backing a confirmatory referendum on any negotiated withdrawal deal.

== Personal life ==
Powell is a lifelong supporter of Manchester City F.C., and has written about her background and political values in The Guardian. As of November 2012, she lives with her husband, who is a doctor, her step-son and daughter.

In 2021, Powell was named among 115 Members of Parliament identified as landlords. She disputed this characterisation, stating on social media: "I have a lodger. I'm not a landlord." Housing lawyer Nick Bano, writing in Jacobin, argued that this distinction was legally irrelevant, asserting that lodgers still lack basic housing protections. He described Powell's response as "defensive" and criticised what he saw as a failure to recognise the potential conflict between rent collection during a housing crisis and the duties of elected representatives.

On 6 July 2024, Powell was appointed to the Privy Council of the United Kingdom, entitling her to the honorific style "The Right Honourable".

Parliament of the United Kingdom
Preceded by Tony Lloyd	Member of Parliament for Manchester Central; 2012–present	Incumbent
Political offices
Preceded by Sharon Hodgson	Shadow Minister for Childcare and Early Years; 2013–2014	Succeeded by Alison McGovern
Preceded by Michael Dugher	Shadow Minister for the Cabinet Office; 2014–2015	Succeeded by Tom Watson
Preceded by Tristram Hunt	Shadow Secretary of State for Education; 2015–2016	Succeeded by Pat Glass
Preceded by Bill Esterson	Shadow Minister for Business and Consumers; 2020–2021	Succeeded by Seema Malhotra
Preceded by Thangam Debbonaire	Shadow Secretary of State for Housing; 2021	Succeeded by Lisa Nandy
Preceded by Jo Stevens	Shadow Secretary of State for Culture, Media and Sport; 2021–2023	Succeeded by Thangam Debbonaire
Preceded by Thangam Debbonaire	Shadow Leader of the House of Commons; 2023–2024	Succeeded by Chris Philp
Preceded by Penny Mordaunt	Leader of the House of Commons; 2024–2025	Succeeded by Alan Campbell
Preceded by Penny Mordaunt	Lord President of the Council; 2024–2025	Succeeded by Alan Campbell
Preceded by Bridget Phillipson	Secretary of State for Education; 2026–present	Incumbent
Party political offices
Preceded by Angela Rayner	Deputy Leader of the Labour Party; 2025–present	Incumbent
