= Bob Litherland =

British politician

Member of Parliament for Manchester Central
- In office 28 September 1979 – 8 April 1997
- Preceded by: Harold Lever
- Succeeded by: Tony Lloyd

Personal details
- Born: 23 June 1930 Collyhurst, Manchester, Lancashire, England
- Died: 13 May 2011 (aged 80) Manchester, Greater Manchester, England
- Party: Labour
- Spouse: Edna (1953-2011)
- Children: 2

Robert Kenneth Litherland (23 June 1930 – 13 May 2011), known as Bob Litherland, was a British Labour politician.

He was elected Member of Parliament (MP) for Manchester Central at a by-election in September 1979, and held the office until he retired at the 1997 general election.

== Early life ==
Litherland was born to a working-class family in Collyhurst, Manchester. His father was an engineer and his mother was a mill worker. He attended a grammar school but left at the age of fifteen to train as a bookbinder, going on to be a sales representative for a printing company. He was active in the trade union the Society of Graphical and Allied Trades (Sogat) and joined the Labour party at sixteen.

== Career ==
Litherland was elected to Manchester City Council in 1971 for the ward of Harpurhey. He became chairman of the council's direct works committee, overseeing slum clearance. A believer in municipal socialism, he took pride in the improvements to council housing in the city and revealed a cartel fixing the price of cement.

=== Member of Parliament ===
After Labour's defeat in the 1979 general election, Harold Lever, the MP for Manchester Central, was made a life peer, leading to the first by-election of that parliament. The first MP sponsored by Sogat, Litherland won the Labour nomination and was elected that September by a majority of 5,992. A left-winger, he welcomed Michael Foot's successful Labour party leadership bid and sponsored Tony Benn in his failed 1981 deputy leadership challenge. He would later support Eric Heffer and John Prescott in their leadership bids.

In 1981, a year after the beginning of the Soviet–Afghan War, he made a controversial fact-finding visit to Kabul with two other Labour MPs. After a five-day stay he concluded that Babrak Karmal's government should be recognised but that Soviet forces should leave Afghanistan.

Litherland worked hard for his constituents. In 1982 he protested to ministers about poor conditions at Strangeways prison and in 1983 he demanded an inquiry into poor-quality tower blocks. After boundary changes in 1983, his local popularity meant he was selected for the redrawn Manchester Central seat over frontbencher Charles Morris, whose Manchester Openshaw seat had been abolished. He was re-elected with a majority of nearly 20,000.

He chose to retire from politics when he reached retirement age, stepping down as an MP at the 1997 general election. This meant that despite spending eighteen years in Parliament he never served as a government MP.

== Political beliefs ==
Litherland was a staunch socialist and held some radical beliefs. However, he realised that Labour needed to pursue popular policies in order to gain power and that socialists had to co-operate to succeed. He was a member of the Campaign for Nuclear Disarmament and opposed the deployment of troops to the Falklands War. He opposed Conservative Party laws on trade unions and criticised Margaret Thatcher for promoting democracy abroad, such as during her visit to Poland, while suppressing unions at home.

== Personal life ==
Litherland married his wife Edna in 1953. They had two children, five grandchildren and six great-grandchildren.

He died in May 2011 after living with cancer for ten years.

Parliament of the United Kingdom
Preceded by Harold Lever	Member of Parliament for Manchester Central; 1979–1997	Succeeded by Tony Lloyd
