= 2011 Oldham East and Saddleworth by-election =

- 13 January 2011

Oldham East and Saddleworth constituency
- Turnout: 48% (▼13.2 pp)
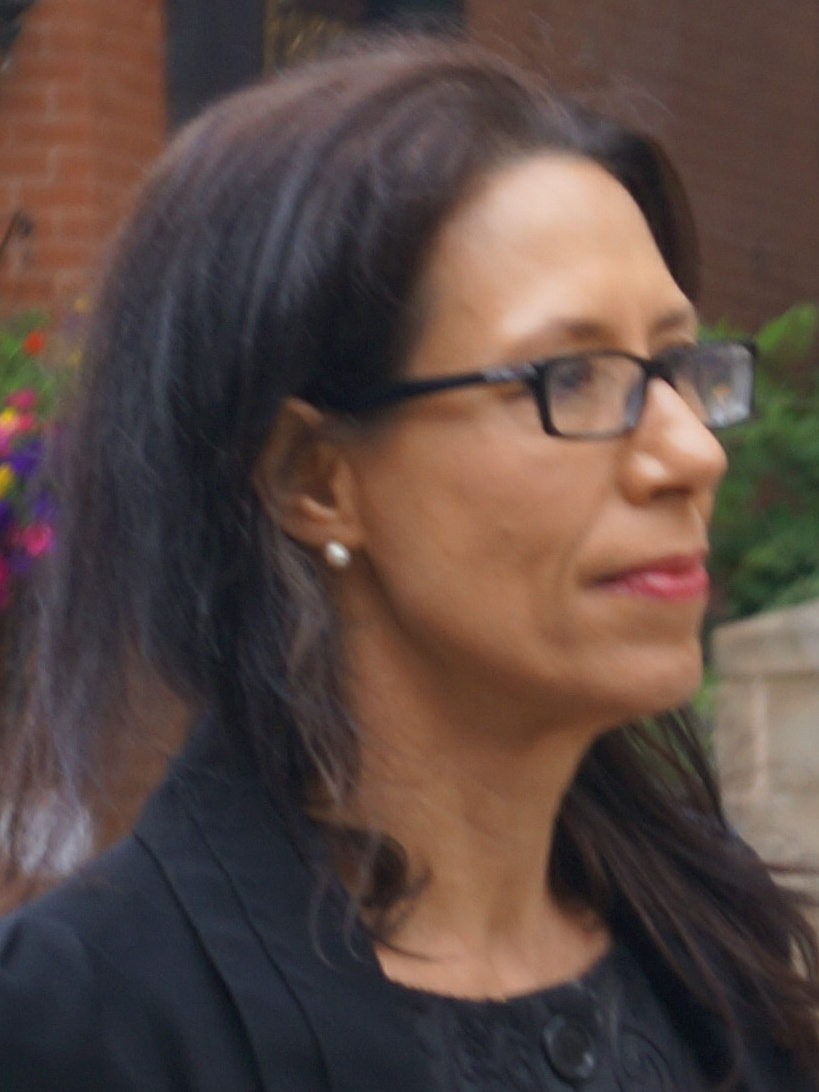

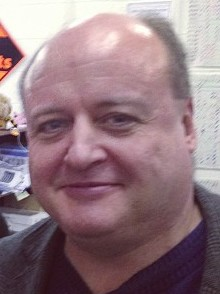

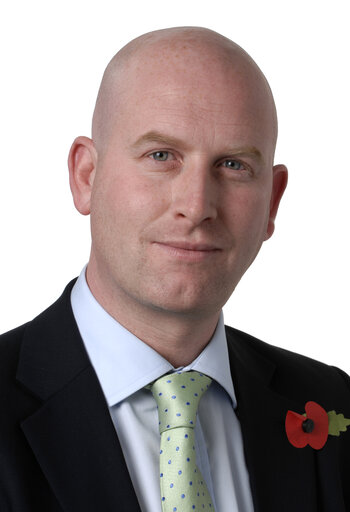
	First party	Second party
Candidate	Debbie Abrahams	Elwyn Watkins
Party	Labour	Liberal Democrats
Popular vote	14,718	11,160
Percentage	42.1%	31.9%
Swing	▲10.2 pp	▲0.3 pp
	Third party	Fourth party
	Con
Candidate	Kashif Ali	Paul Nuttall
Party	Conservative	UKIP
Popular vote	4,481	2,029
Percentage	12.8%	5.8%
Swing	▼13.6 pp	▲1.9 pp
MP before election
Phil Woolas
Labour
Subsequent MP
Debbie Abrahams
Labour

A by-election for the United Kingdom parliamentary constituency of Oldham East and Saddleworth was held on 13 January 2011, following its 2010 general election result being declared void by an election court. Labour Party candidate and incumbent MP Phil Woolas was found to have knowingly made false statements attacking his Liberal Democrat opponent Elwyn Watkins's personal character, and a re-run of the election in the seat was ordered. Debbie Abrahams, also of Labour, held the seat for her party with an increased majority over the Liberal Democrats.

This was the first by-election of the 2010–2015 parliament, and the first to be caused by a court overturning the previous result since the 1997 Winchester by-election.

== Background ==
Election leaflet by Phil Woolas used during the general election and ruled to contain deliberate false statements attacking Elwyn Watkins' character.

=== 2010 general election ===
In his 2010 re-election campaign, Labour candidate Phil Woolas's campaigning methods were heavily criticised by his Liberal Democrat opponents and the Muslim Public Affairs Committee UK (MPACUK). Critics accused him, among other things, of "inflaming racial tensions" in an area that had already experienced race riots. Trevor Phillips, head of the Equality and Human Rights Commission and former Labour politician, described some of the language used in the party's leaflets as "not helpful."

Woolas and his agent, Joseph Fitzpatrick, were also responsible for photo manipulation of images in his election addresses. In one case, they manipulated an image to show his Liberal Democrat candidate Elwyn Watkins in front of armed police, allegedly to imply Watkins had been arrested. This was a composite image, consisting of a portrait of Watkins and a photograph of armed police patrolling London. The Metropolitan Police insignia was also airbrushed from a female officer's jacket.

Woolas narrowly won the election with a majority of just 103 votes ahead of Watkins—down from 3,590 in 2005.

=== Election court case ===
On 28 May 2010, Watkins issued an election petition against the result under section 106 of the Representation of the People Act 1983, which makes it illegal to make false statements of fact about a candidate. He claimed that leaflets issued by Woolas falsely portrayed Watkins as taking unlawful foreign donations, and linked him to Islamists.

During the court case, held in public at Saddleworth Civic Hall, a number of emails between Woolas and his campaign team emerged. In one, Fitzpatrick emailed Woolas and Steven Green, the MP's campaign adviser, to say: "Things are not going as well as I had hoped ... we need to think about our first attack leaflet." A reply from Fitzpatrick said: "If we don’t get the white vote angry he's gone."

During the course of the court case, both Woolas and Fitzpatrick were cautioned by the presiding judge in respect of possible criminal charges relating to election offences. The court hearing finished in September 2010.

On 5 November 2010, the court ruled that Woolas was guilty of knowingly making false statements which breached section 106 of the Representation of the People Act 1983, and ordered a re-run of the 2010 general election in his constituency. In addition, Woolas was removed from office with immediate effect and banned from holding public office for three years.

Woolas applied for a judicial review of the decision: his initial application was rejected, but he entered a second request for a review. Speaker of the House of Commons John Bercow stated that a date for the by-election would not be set until all legal proceedings were complete. Woolas's second request for review was heard at the High Court on 16 November 2010; the Court of Appeal announced on 3 December 2010 that, although one of the three statements on which the election court had found Woolas guilty was not within the Act, the other two were and so the judgment was upheld, after which Woolas declared "That's it – I'm out", conceding defeat and leaving the way open for the by-election.

By parliamentary convention, the party who last held the seat moves the writ for the by-election, and it was rumoured that Labour planned to call the election for 3 February 2011. (Note: Note this convention is not always followed and the Speaker is required to accept a writ correctly moved from any source. For example, the writ for a by-election in Cardiff North West in 1983 was moved by a Plaid Cymru MP despite the seat having been vacated on the death of its Conservative MP. (The by-election was then superseded by the 1983 general election and thus never held.)) However, a writ for the election was instead moved for 13 January by the Liberal Democrats.

== Candidates ==
The Labour Party had more than eighty members apply to be their candidate in the election. Initial frontrunner Afzal Khan was not shortlisted, and the party instead selected Debbie Abrahams from a shortlist of three. Abrahams had unsuccessfully fought to retain the Colne Valley seat at the 2010 general election following the retirement of Kali Mountford, where Labour fell from first to third place, and is married to the former Lancashire cricket captain John Abrahams. The Liberal Democrats again selected Elwyn Watkins to fight the by-election; Watkins is a former Rochdale borough councillor who had previously worked as a business advisor to a Saudi Arabian sheikh. The Conservative Party also reselected their general election candidate, Kashif Ali, a barrister from Higginshaw.

Two other parties who stood in the general election confirmed new candidates for the by-election. The British National Party at first announced that their candidate would be party leader Nick Griffin, who had stood in neighbouring Oldham West and Royton in 2001. However Griffin was replaced by former Manchester pub landlord Derek Adams, who had contested Blackley and Broughton at the 2010 general election. The UK Independence Party nominated their new deputy leader, Paul Nuttall, who was, at the time, a Member of the European Parliament (MEP) for North West England.

Three further smaller parties which had not fought the general election put up candidates. The Green Party chose Peter Allen, from nearby Glossop; he works in an advice centre in Manchester. Stephen Morris, an official of Manchester Metrolink and trade union branch official, was announced as the candidate for the English Democrats; he is also chairman of the party. Musician, composer and teacher Loz Kaye, who had recently become leader of the Pirate Party, was also nominated.

Two further fringe candidates had less serious agendas. Nick Delves, who had acquired the nickname "the flying brick" after a paragliding accident, became the Official Monster Raving Loony Party candidate, while artist and poet David Bishop (founder of the Church of the Militant Elvis Party) offered himself to the electors as a 'Bus Pass Elvis' candidate.

== Campaign ==
A selection of campaign materials delivered to constituents for the by-election

As the first by-election since the establishment of the Conservative-Liberal Democrat coalition government, there was interest in whether the two parties would form a pact. Prime Minister David Cameron publicly wished Watkins well at the start of the campaign, but both parties officially rejected the idea that there was a pact, with Vince Cable of the Liberal Democrats claiming that the Tories had no chance of winning the seat, and Cameron later reminding voters that it had been a three-horse race in 2010. Both former Lib Dem leader Charles Kennedy and Labour Party leader Ed Miliband claimed that it was the first opportunity for voters to make their views known on the coalition, although David Cameron argued that it was instead about the actions of Woolas. Woolas himself claimed that his disqualification would help the Labour Party, as voters would object to courts overturning the election result.

The Labour Party complained that the date of the by-election would make it difficult for students to vote, as they would not yet have returned to their studies in the constituency. However, the Liberal Democrats claimed that this would be outweighed by the number of students at their parents' houses during their holidays from universities elsewhere.

Leaders of all three major parties campaigned in the seat in the run-up to the election, David Cameron noted that he was the first prime minister to campaign in an English by-election since 1997, when Tony Blair campaigned in the Uxbridge by-election – Gordon Brown had campaigned in 2008 for the Glenrothes by-election in Scotland. On 6 January, a week prior to the by-election, The Times endorsed the Liberal Democrats and their candidate Elwyn Watkins.

On the last weekend of the campaign, Liberal Democrat MP and government minister Andrew Stunell issued a party press release hailing a government scheme to reuse empty homes. The scheme was only officially unveiled on the following Monday, and shadow Minister for the Cabinet Office Jon Trickett wrote to the Cabinet Secretary Sir Gus O'Donnell questioning whether Stunell's actions had broken the rules on election period 'purdah'. O'Donnell wrote back on 12 January explaining that Stunell "recognises with hindsight" that his party press release could have been linked by the public with a government spending announcement, and that Stunell had apologised for the mistake.

Two opinion polling companies released constituency polls for the by-election on 8 January. ICM and Populus used sample sizes of 340 and 772, respectively (excluding those who refused to respond or did not specify a party). ICM's figures of Labour 44%, Liberal Democrats 27% and Conservatives 18% represented a sharp percentage decrease of 8% for the Conservatives, contrasted with a sizable 12% increase for Labour and a modest 5% decline in Liberal Democrat support since the 2010 general election, indicating a secure Labour victory in the constituency. Populus' figures uncovered similar trends, recording voting intention as Labour 46%, Liberal Democrats 29% and Conservatives 15%, representing percentage changes since May 2010 of −11% for the Conservatives, +14% for Labour and −3% for the Liberal Democrats. A telephone poll by Survation reported voting intention figures of Labour 31%, Liberal Democrats 30%, Conservatives 6% and undecided 23% (note the ICM and Populus poll figures exclude undecideds), on a sample size of 293 (excluding those who refused to respond).

== Result ==
Having only narrowly retained the seat at the general election eight months earlier, Labour retained it once again but this time with a vastly increased majority, with the Liberal Democrats finishing second.

Election	Political result	Candidate	Party	Votes	%	±%
By-election, 2011; 2010 result voided on petition Electorate: 72,788; Turnout: 34,930 (48.0%) –13.1	Labour hold Majority: 3,558 (10.2%) +10.0; Swing: 5.0% from Lib Dem to Lab	Debbie Abrahams	Labour	14,718	42.1	+10.2
By-election, 2011; 2010 result voided on petition Electorate: 72,788; Turnout: 34,930 (48.0%) –13.1	Labour hold Majority: 3,558 (10.2%) +10.0; Swing: 5.0% from Lib Dem to Lab	Elwyn Watkins	Liberal Democrats	11,160	31.9	+0.3
By-election, 2011; 2010 result voided on petition Electorate: 72,788; Turnout: 34,930 (48.0%) –13.1	Labour hold Majority: 3,558 (10.2%) +10.0; Swing: 5.0% from Lib Dem to Lab	Kashif Ali	Conservative	4,481	12.8	–13.6
By-election, 2011; 2010 result voided on petition Electorate: 72,788; Turnout: 34,930 (48.0%) –13.1	Labour hold Majority: 3,558 (10.2%) +10.0; Swing: 5.0% from Lib Dem to Lab	Paul Nuttall	UKIP	2,029	5.8	+1.9
By-election, 2011; 2010 result voided on petition Electorate: 72,788; Turnout: 34,930 (48.0%) –13.1	Labour hold Majority: 3,558 (10.2%) +10.0; Swing: 5.0% from Lib Dem to Lab	Derek Adams	BNP	1,560	4.5	–1.2
By-election, 2011; 2010 result voided on petition Electorate: 72,788; Turnout: 34,930 (48.0%) –13.1	Labour hold Majority: 3,558 (10.2%) +10.0; Swing: 5.0% from Lib Dem to Lab	Peter Allen	Green	530	1.5	New
By-election, 2011; 2010 result voided on petition Electorate: 72,788; Turnout: 34,930 (48.0%) –13.1	Labour hold Majority: 3,558 (10.2%) +10.0; Swing: 5.0% from Lib Dem to Lab	Nick "The Flying Brick" Delves	Monster Raving Loony	145	0.4	New
By-election, 2011; 2010 result voided on petition Electorate: 72,788; Turnout: 34,930 (48.0%) –13.1	Labour hold Majority: 3,558 (10.2%) +10.0; Swing: 5.0% from Lib Dem to Lab	Stephen Morris	English Democrat	144	0.4	New
By-election, 2011; 2010 result voided on petition Electorate: 72,788; Turnout: 34,930 (48.0%) –13.1	Labour hold Majority: 3,558 (10.2%) +10.0; Swing: 5.0% from Lib Dem to Lab	Loz Kaye	Pirate	96	0.3	New
By-election, 2011; 2010 result voided on petition Electorate: 72,788; Turnout: 34,930 (48.0%) –13.1	Labour hold Majority: 3,558 (10.2%) +10.0; Swing: 5.0% from Lib Dem to Lab	David Bishop	Bus-Pass Elvis	67	0.1	New
General election 2010; Electorate: 72,557; Turnout: 44,520 (61.2%) +4.4	Labour hold Majority: 103 (0.3%) –10.2; Swing: 5.1% from Lab to Lib Dem	Phil Woolas	Labour	14,186	31.9	–10.7
General election 2010; Electorate: 72,557; Turnout: 44,520 (61.2%) +4.4	Labour hold Majority: 103 (0.3%) –10.2; Swing: 5.1% from Lab to Lib Dem	Elwyn Watkins	Liberal Democrats	14,083	31.6	–0.5
General election 2010; Electorate: 72,557; Turnout: 44,520 (61.2%) +4.4	Labour hold Majority: 103 (0.3%) –10.2; Swing: 5.1% from Lab to Lib Dem	Kashif Ali	Conservative	11,773	26.4	+8.7
General election 2010; Electorate: 72,557; Turnout: 44,520 (61.2%) +4.4	Labour hold Majority: 103 (0.3%) –10.2; Swing: 5.1% from Lab to Lib Dem	Alwyn Stott	BNP	2,546	5.7	+0.8
General election 2010; Electorate: 72,557; Turnout: 44,520 (61.2%) +4.4	Labour hold Majority: 103 (0.3%) –10.2; Swing: 5.1% from Lab to Lib Dem	David Bentley	UKIP	1,720	3.9	+1.8
General election 2010; Electorate: 72,557; Turnout: 44,520 (61.2%) +4.4	Labour hold Majority: 103 (0.3%) –10.2; Swing: 5.1% from Lab to Lib Dem	Gulzar Nazir	Christian	212	0.5	New

== See also ==
- List of United Kingdom by-elections
- Opinion polling for the 2015 United Kingdom general election
