= Higginshaw =

Area of Oldham, Greater Manchester, England

Coordinates: 53.556786°N 2.104663°W

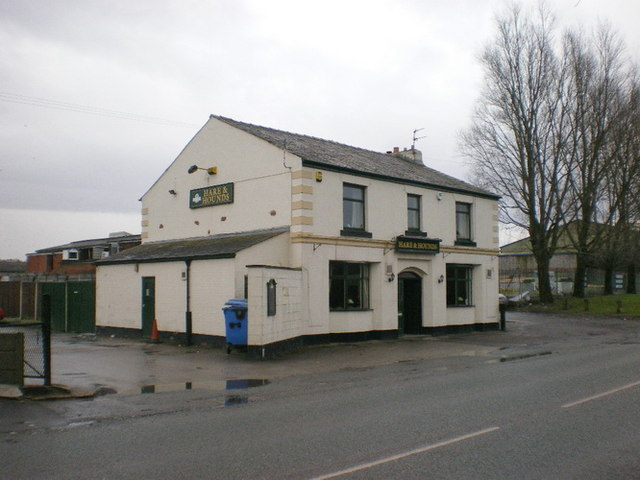
- Hare and Hounds, Higginshaw Lane

- Location within Greater Manchester
- OS grid reference: SD944045
- Metropolitan borough: Oldham
- Metropolitan county: Greater Manchester
- Region: North West
- Country: England
- Sovereign state: United Kingdom
- Post town: OLDHAM
- Postcode district: OL1-OL2, OL4
- Dialling code: 0161
- Police: Greater Manchester
- Fire: Greater Manchester
- Ambulance: North West
- UK Parliament: Oldham West and Royton

Higginshaw is an area of Oldham, Greater Manchester, England.

== Buildings and structures ==
- Jubilee Colliery

== Gallery ==
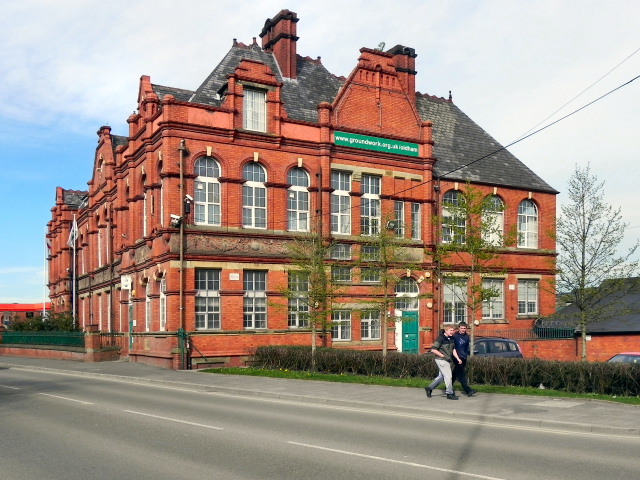
Former boarding school

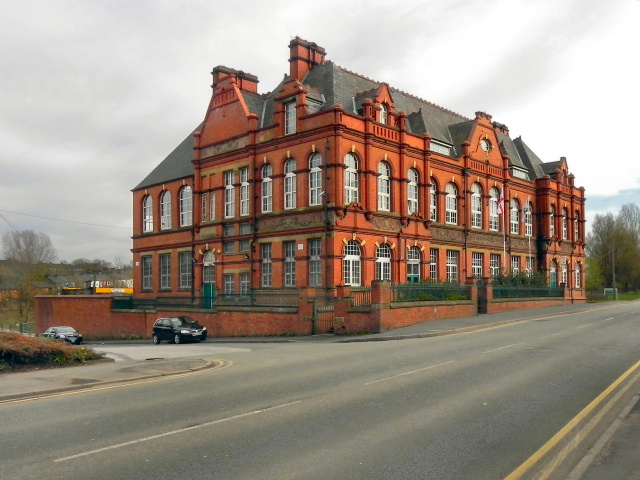
Former boarding school

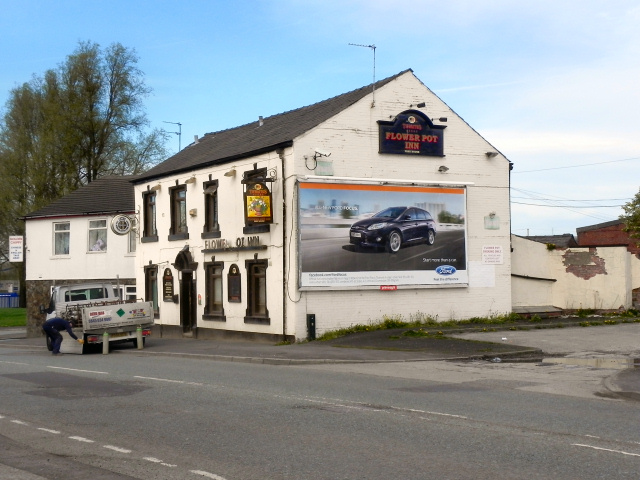
Flowerpot Inn

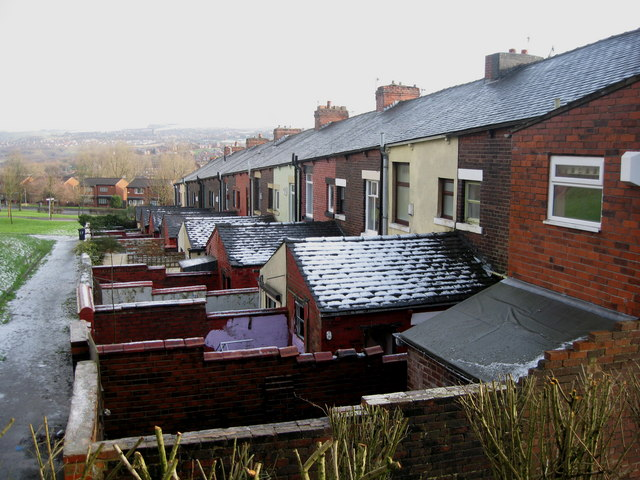
Charter Street
