= Pirate Party UK =

Pirate Party UK Pirate Party UK Welsh: Plaid Môr-leidr DU
- Leader: Jason Artemis Winstanley
- Founded: 30 July 2009; 2023 (relaunch)
- Ideology: Pirate politics
- Colours: Purple, black and white
- House of Commons: 0 / 650
- Local government: 0 / 19,481

Website
- ukpirate.party

The Pirate Party UK (often abbreviated PPUK; in Welsh: Plaid Môr-leidr DU) is a political party in the United Kingdom. The Pirate Party's core policies are to bring about reform to copyright and patent laws, support privacy, reduce surveillance from government and businesses, and support freedom of speech and freedom of expression.

The party was established in July 2009. The first leader of the party was Andrew Robinson, who stepped down in August 2010. Laurence "Loz" Kaye was elected to replace him in September 2010, and served until after the 2015 general election, when he stepped down. Following Kaye's resignation, a leadership election was held, with Cris Chesha being elected leader and David A Elston being elected the party's first deputy leader.

The party announced that it had voted to dissolve on 7 October 2020, and was de-registered as a political party by the Electoral Commission on 9 November 2020. In August 2023, the Electoral Commission was considering an application to register the re-formed party as part of its assessment process, which it approved on 14 December.

== History ==
Following The Pirate Bay trial, a large surge in Pirate Party interest occurred around the world. After the success of the Swedish Pirate Party in the summer 2009 European elections, there was a sudden growth of Pirate Party organisations across Europe (notably in Germany and France) and beyond. Forum membership soared. The official formation of the Pirate Party in the UK followed shortly after the European elections and the Pirate Party UK was officially registered on 30 July 2009. In August 2009, it was claimed that Pirate Party UK was undergoing rapid growth similar to one the Swedish Pirate Party had enjoyed in early 2009. It was reported that it had been flooded with enquiries and at its peak around 100 people an hour were signing up to become party members. Donations had been coming in so fast that PayPal was concerned it was a fraudulent site.

On 30 March 2010, the party declared its intent to stand ten candidates across England and Scotland. However, to do so, further party funding would be required. On 27 April 2010, the party announced that it had nine official candidates on the ballot papers, as Mark Sims had missed the deadline because of the air travel disruption after the 2010 Eyjafjallajökull eruption. Following the resignation of first party leader Andrew Robinson, the composer and lecturer Laurence "Loz" Kaye was elected as the new leader on 26 September 2010. In a message sent to members, Kaye stated his key aim as "building the political structure of the party". Previously, Kaye had been the election agent for candidate Tim Dobson who stood for Pirate Party UK in Manchester Gorton.

In the run-up to the 2015 general election, the Pirate Party crowdsourced its manifesto using Reddit. The process ran until 21 March 2015. The Party stood a total of six candidates in the 2015 General Election, including leader Loz Kaye in Manchester Central, who won the largest share of the vote in his constituency with 0.8%.

Following the 2015 general election in May, Kaye stepped down as leader. With the role of deputy leader also being vacant, George Walkden, the party's nominating officer, was approved by the board of governors to serve as an interim leader until the party elected a new leader. Following the leadership election, Cris Chesha was elected leader of the party and David Elston was elected the first deputy leader. Six new governors were elected, with six governors being re-elected. Rebecca Rae was elected to the role of campaigns officer on the NEC. On 18 June, Andrew Norton stepped down as chair of the board, and was replaced by the deputy chair of the board, Andrew Robinson, the leader of the party from 2009 to 2010. On 29 July 2015, Will Tovey was elected as the next deputy chair of the board to replace Robinson. Will Tovey subsequently became chair of the board, and Adrian Farrel replaced him on 14 December 2016. The party's extended period without an elected NEC caught the attention of larger media outlets in October 2016 where Kaye and Elston gave comment.

In June 2017, when the snap general election was called, the Pirate Party UK was under the acting leadership of deputy leader David Elston, the position of party leader being vacant following Chesha's resignation in November 2015. The party launched its manifesto for the 2017 general election on 17 May 2017 in Vauxhall, the home constituency of its lead candidate Mark Chapman, in front of the MI6 building. A crowdfunding campaign, dubbed "Operation Doubloons", was also launched in June to help the party cover the costs of candidate deposits and election materials.

The party subsequently stood ten candidates in the 2017 election, the highest number in the history of the party. These included Elston in Vale of Glamorgan, Chapman in Vauxhall and the party's nominations officer, Jason Winstanley, in Gower. The largest share of the vote was won by Des Hjerling, standing in New Forest West, who received 1% of the vote. Following the election, Elston wrote in a Leader's Update that "Pirates were one of the few parties to make gains" in the election, highlighting the fact that the party had increased its overall share of the vote and more than doubled the number of votes it gained across all candidates compared with the 2015 general election results.

On 29 October 2019, the Pirate Party UK issued a General Election Statement stating that it would not be fielding candidates in the December 2019 general election because of concern that its candidates could split the vote in a "single-issue election" and thus increase the likelihood of the election of candidates whose opinions regarding the UK's future relationship with the EU were incompatible with those of the PPUK.

In 2020, following a period of stagnation attributed to the challenges of the first-past-the-post voting electoral system (the party declared its support for proportional representation for all elections in the UK in its 2017 manifesto), the focus of political debate on Brexit, and the pressures of the COVID-19 pandemic, the party held a vote on whether or not to disband. The vote to dissolve the party passed with 73% of votes cast in favour of closing down the party. The result of the votes was announced by the party on 7 October 2020 and were as follows:

Vote	Count
Yes	33
No	9
Abstain	3

The party was re-started in 2023 and submitted an application to the Electoral Commission on 10 August 2023 which was approved on 14 December. As part of its re-launch it has committed itself to supporting transgender rights.

Since August 2023, the Pirate Party UK has considered joining Pirate Parties International.

== Aims and policies ==
The Pirate Party UK states its aims are "copyright and patent law reform, supporting privacy, reducing surveillance by governments and businesses, and championing freedom of speech and expression".

=== Policies ===
The party believes that Internet access is a universal and basic right. As such the party supports increasing access to the internet and making it more affordable.

The party advocates for the protection of online privacy and associated rights. In response to the Online Safety Bill (now Online Safety Act 2023), the Pirate Party stated that it is opposed to "mass surveillance and [the undermining of] the fundamental right to private conversations", the introduction of backdoors and the weakening of encryption on "sensitive data" and has been outspoken in its opposition to the use of the Clipper chip. As such, the PPUK campaigns for limiting communications monitoring to "cases where there is clear evidence of criminal activity" and ensuring that the integrity of end-to-end encryption is not compromised by opposing the use of backdoors and weakened encryption.

The party has expressed its support of transgender rights, and has been outspoken in its belief that "a person's gender identity is a deeply personal matter" and that "it is not a decision that can or should be imposed upon someone by external parties, even if those parties happen to be their parents". It has stated its support of the implementation of increased digital literacy education. The party's policy on gender identity self-determination is extended to children choosing "their preferred names, pronouns, and gender presentations" in school.

The party advocates increased judicial review and the increased involvements of external technical experts in the technological field.

In response to a "leaked report from 2016 by official drug advisers", the party has announced that it supports the decriminalisation of drug possession.

The party supports rent controls and improved support for first-time home buyers.

The party supports a universal basic income (UBI) that would replace multiple welfare programs, including Jobseeker's Allowance and child benefits.

Other policies the party advocates for include, eliminating candidates deposits for elections (such as the £500 to stand to be an MP), having a proportional representation electoral system, removing bishops from the House of Lords, and utilising geothermal energy and geothermal heating.

== Organisation ==
=== Leadership ===
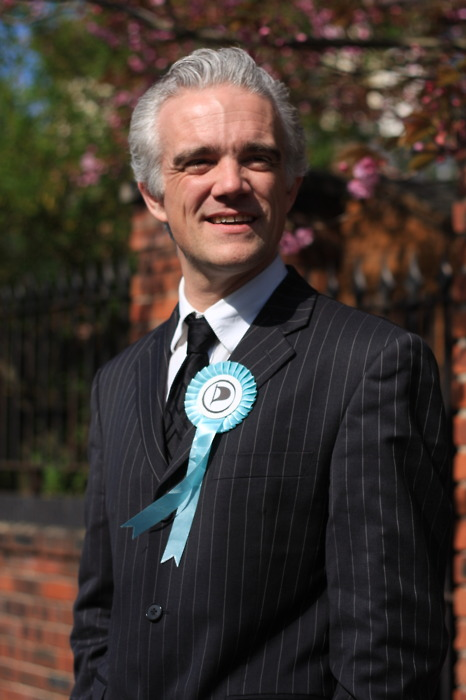
Pirate Party UK's former leader Loz Kaye

#	Name	Leadership began	Leadership ended	Notes
1	Andrew Robinson	30 July 2009	23 August 2010	
—	Vacant	23 August 2010	27 September 2010	
2	Loz Kaye	27 September 2010	9 May 2015	
3	George Walkden	9 May 2015	4 July 2015	Interim leader
4	Cris Chesha	4 July 2015	26 November 2015	
—	Vacant	26 November 2015	10 February 2016	
5	David A Elston	10 February 2016	19 February 2016	Acting leader
—	Vacant	19 February 2016	3 February 2017	
5	David A Elston	3 February 2017	26 October 2017	Re-elected acting leader
6	Harley Faggetter	24 November 2017	9 November 2020	
7	Lucy Maber	11 March 2023	19 June 2025	
8	Jason Artemis Winstanley	19 June 2025		

=== Deputy Leadership ===
#	Name	Leadership began	Leadership ended	Notes
1	David A Elston	4 July 2015	19 February 2016	
—	Vacant	19 February 2016	3 February 2017	
1	David A Elston	3 February 2017	26 October 2017	Re-elected
2	Mark Chapman	24 November 2017	9 November 2020	

=== Branches ===
The Pirate Party UK had branches in many places around the United Kingdom. These included London, York, Greater Manchester, Sheffield and Bury.

==== Pirate Party Wales ====
Pirate Party Wales (Welsh: Plaid Môr-leidr Cymru) is a branch of the Pirate Party UK that covers the entirety of Wales and was founded in 2014 by David Anthony Elston. Pirate Party Wales supports increasing the recognition of the Welsh language, including reform of the Welsh Language Act 1993 and free Welsh courses for all Welsh nationals. It also supports further devolution to Wales and increased powers for the Welsh Assembly. The only candidate to have stood in Wales for the party was Elston who stood in Bridgend in the 2015 general election.

=== International affiliation ===
On 25 February 2015, the Pirate Party UK announced its withdrawal from its international affiliation, Pirate Party International. This announcement, consolidated by a vote of the board, followed Pirate Party Australia's decision to leave earlier in the same month.

== Membership ==
Year	Membership
2009	590
2010	457
2011	224
2012	748
2013	557
2014	689
2015	766
2016	500
2017	420
2018	260
2019	228

== Election results ==
It has previously been noted by Robinson, the first Pirate Party UK leader, that the Pirate Party UK's chances of getting a candidate elected to the UK parliament are "pretty much close to zero", because of the first past the post system for electing MPs to Parliament. Instead, its immediate aim is to raise awareness among voters and politicians in the other political parties.

The Pirate Party UK contested its first election in 2010, standing nine candidates in the 2010 general election. The party also stood candidates in the 2011 Oldham East and Saddleworth and 2012 Manchester Central by-elections. The party also contested several local government elections and the 2011 Scottish Parliament election. The party stood six candidates in the 2015 general election, and ten in the 2017 snap general election. In general elections, none of its candidates have ever received more than one per cent of the vote.

Year	Candidates	Votes	Seats
2010	9	1,340	0 / 650
2015	6	1,130	0 / 650
2017	10	2,321	0 / 650

== See also ==
- Open Rights Group
