= 1979 Manchester Central by-election =

UK parliamentary by-election

← May 1979	27 September 1979	1983 →

Manchester Central constituency
- Turnout: 33.8% ▼29.9 pp
	First party	Second party	Third party
	LAB	LIB	CON
Candidate	Bob Litherland	Anthony Parkinson	Stephen Lea
Party	Labour	Liberal	Conservative
Popular vote	7,494	1,502	1,275
Percentage	70.7%	14.2%	12.0%
Swing	0.0 pp	▲8.9 pp	▼10.1 pp
MP before election
Harold Lever
Labour
Subsequent MP
Bob Litherland
Labour

The 1979 Manchester Central by-election was a parliamentary by-election held on 27 September 1979 for the British House of Commons constituency of Manchester Central.

The seat had become vacant when the constituency's Labour Member of Parliament (MP), Harold Lever had been made a life peer on 3 July 1979. He had held the seat since its creation for the February 1974 general election, having represented previous constituencies in Manchester since the 1945 general election.

Being held less than five months after the 1979 general election (where the Tories had won power from Labour after five years), it was the first by-election of the 1979–1983 parliament.

== Result ==
Manchester Central was a safe seat for Labour. On a heavily reduced turnout, the result of the contest was a victory for the Labour candidate, Bob Litherland, who won with the same 70.7% share of the vote which Lever had won at the general election in May 1979.

Syed Ala-Ud-Din stood in protest at not being selected as the Labour candidate.

Litherland held the seat until he retired from the House of Commons at the 1997 general election.

Manchester Central by-election, 1979
Party	Candidate	Votes	%	±%
Labour	Bob Litherland	7,494	70.7	0.0
Liberal	Anthony Parkinson	1,502	14.2	+8.9
Conservative	Stephen Lea	1,275	12.0	−10.1
Independent Labour	Syed Ala-Ud-Din	187	1.8	New
Ecology	John Foster	129	1.2	New
Democratic Monarchist, Public Safety, White Resident.	Bill Boaks	12	0.1	New
Majority		5,992	56.5	+7.9
Turnout		10,599	33.8	−29.9
Labour hold		Swing		

== See also ==
- Manchester Central (UK Parliament constituency)
- Manchester
- List of United Kingdom by-elections
