= Loz Kaye =

British politician and composer (born 1970)

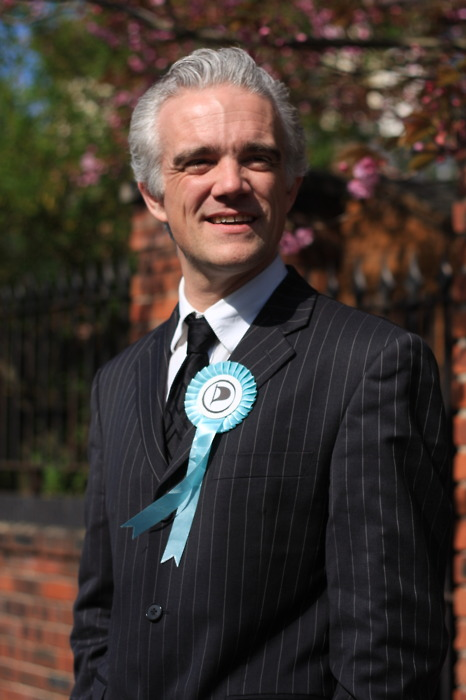

Leader of Pirate Party UK
- In office 26 September 2010 – 9 May 2015
- Preceded by: Andrew Robinson
- Succeeded by: George Walkden (Interim Leader); Cris Chesha (Elected Leader)

Personal details
- Party: Pirate Party UK (since 2010)
- Other political affiliations: Labour Party (until 1993)

Laurence "Loz" Kaye is a British musician, composer, activist and politician. Kaye was Leader of Pirate Party UK from 26 September 2010 to 9 May 2015.

Kaye has spoken and campaigned on digital rights, copyright law and civil liberties in the past.

== Professional career ==
Kaye has worked as a lecturer at the Liverpool Institute for Performing Arts and has also taught extensively in Denmark in the past, including at the Danish department of the Russian Academy of Theatre Arts (GITIS) in Aarhus. He is a visiting lecturer at Salford University on the Physical and Dance Theatre Degree, and is currently the musical director at Manchester Lesbian and Gay Chorus. and the artistic director of the community music and education charity More Music

As a composer his work is particularly associated with visual theatre company Horse and Bamboo Theatre, Huddersfield-based Darkhorse Theater and mask theatre company Thalias Tjenere.

== Political career ==
Kaye was a Labour Party activist until 1993, when he left the party.

Kaye was first elected as a governor on the board of governors of the Pirate Party UK in July 2010. was the Election Agent for Tim Dobson in the 2010 general election, Dobson being the Pirate Party UK candidate to receive the most votes in that election. Following the resignation of Andrew Robinson as Leader of the party on 23 August 2010, Kaye was one of four people to put their names forward as candidates in the ensuing leadership election. Two candidates withdrew before nominations closed, leaving only Kaye and Peter Brett as candidates. Kaye won the election with nearly 74% of the vote, with Brett getting 17% and 8% voting to re-open nominations. On 13 March 2011, Kaye left his role as a governor on the board of governors.

As leader of Pirate Party UK, Kaye has been a regular contributor to The Guardian. Kaye is also Chairman of the Greater Manchester branch of Pirate Party UK. He opposed the creation of the directly elected Mayor of Greater Manchester. In March 2014, Kaye was a signatory to a letter calling for the resignation Greater Manchester Police and Crime Commissioner Tony Lloyd.

In January 2012, the British Phonographic Industry threatened to sue Kaye and other National Executive Committee Officers for creating a proxy server that bypassed a court-ordered block of Pirate Bay. Following legal advice, Kaye decided to close the proxy server as a court battle would have incurred huge financial costs.

Kaye was chosen as the Pirate Party's candidate in the Oldham East and Saddleworth by-election on 11 January 2011. One of the main issues that he campaigned on was better rural broadband. He won 96 votes, or 0.3% of the votes, beating only the candidate from the Church of the Militant Elvis Party. Kaye stood in the 2012 local elections in the ward of Bradford on Manchester City Council. He received 127 votes, or 5.2% of the vote, the highest percentage of votes the Pirate Party UK have received in an election to this date. Kaye proceeded to stand as the Pirate Party candidate in the Manchester Central by-election on 15 November 2012. Kaye received 308 votes or 1.9% of the vote, beating candidates from Respect and the Trade Union and Socialist Coalition.

In the 2015 general election, Kaye stood as the Pirate Party UK candidate in Manchester Central. He won 346 votes, or 0.8% of the votes cast. On 9 May 2015, the day after the final results of the 2015 general election were known, Kaye resigned as Leader of Pirate Party UK.

== Electoral performance ==
Parliamentary elections

Date of election	Constituency	Party	Votes	% of votes	Result
2011 by-election	Oldham East and Saddleworth	Pirate Party UK	96	0.3	Not elected
2012 by-election	Manchester Central	Pirate Party UK	308	1.9	Not elected
2015 general election	Manchester Central	Pirate Party UK	346	0.8	Not elected

Local elections

Date of election	Ward	Council	Party	Votes	% of votes	Result
2012 local elections	Bradford	Manchester City Council	Pirate Party UK	127	5.2	Not elected
2014 local elections	Ancoats and Clayton	Manchester City Council	Pirate Party UK	129	3.2	Not elected
