= 2012 Manchester Central by-election =

2012 UK parliamentary by-election

- 15 November 2012

The Manchester Central seat in the House of Commons
- Turnout: 18.2% (▼28.5 pp)
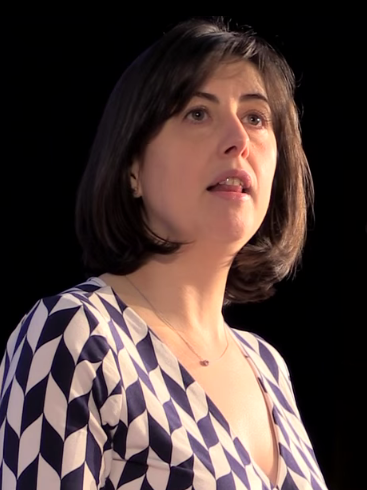
	First party	Second party
		Lib
Candidate	Lucy Powell	Marc Ramsbottom
Party	Labour Co-op	Liberal Democrats
Popular vote	11,507	1,571
Percentage	69.1%	9.4%
Swing	▲16.4 pp	▼17.2 pp
MP before election
Tony Lloyd
Labour
Subsequent MP
Lucy Powell
Labour

A by-election for the United Kingdom parliamentary constituency of Manchester Central was held on 15 November 2012, following the resignation of incumbent Labour Party member of Parliament (MP) Tony Lloyd in order to stand in the inaugural Police and Crime Commissioner elections. It was won by Lucy Powell who held the seat for Labour.

The Liberal Democrats and the Conservatives lost significant numbers of votes compared with the 2010 general election, with the Conservatives losing their deposit. There was an unusually low turnout of just 18.2%, the lowest in a parliamentary by-election since the Second World War. By-elections in Cardiff South and Penarth and Corby were held on the same day, as were the first ever Police and Crime Commissioner elections.

== Background ==
On 14 February 2012, the incumbent Member of Parliament for Manchester Central, Tony Lloyd, announced his intention to resign to seek the Labour Party nomination for the inaugural Police and Crime Commissioner elections for the Greater Manchester Police area which was also held on 15 November 2012. The England and Wales Police and Crime Commissioner elections were on the same day. On 17 March 2012, Lloyd was selected by Labour unopposed. On 22 October 2012, Tony Lloyd was appointed Steward and Bailiff of the Manor of Northstead, a device with which resignations from the House of Commons is administered. Lloyd successfully won the PCC election. PCC election candidates did not have to resign their seats in Parliament upon becoming a nominee. However, in the event of their victory in the election they would have been obliged to do so. Knowing that his likelihood of victory in a traditionally pro-Labour region was high, Lloyd chose to resign early in order for the Westminster by-election to be able to be held at the same time as the PCC election rather than forcing voters to go to the polls again a few weeks later. The decision to resign upon nomination rather than victory was similarly made by Alun Michael, who had been nominated as a PCC candidate for the South Wales Police area and resulted in the 2012 Cardiff South and Penarth by-election being held on the same day.

All registered Parliamentary electors of the Manchester Central constituency (i.e. British, Irish and Commonwealth citizens living in the UK and British citizens living overseas) who were aged 18 or over on 15 November 2012 were entitled to vote in the by-election. The deadline for voters to register to vote in the by-election was midnight on Wednesday 31 October 2012. However, those who qualified as an anonymous elector had until midnight on Thursday 8 November 2012 to register to vote.

== Candidates ==
Nominations closed and 12 candidates were confirmed on 31 October.

On 28 March 2012, Labour confirmed a shortlist of eight candidates. Lucy Powell, Chief of Staff, to party leader Ed Miliband was selected on 16 April. The satirical magazine, Private Eye, reported on Powell's selection noting that "the previous favourite to succeed Lloyd had been Mohammed Afzal Khan, the first ever Asian lord mayor of Manchester, with a good deal of popular local backing and a city councillor since 2000. But nothing could be left to chance and Khan was mysteriously dropped from the Labour party's candidate shortlist - in order to gift the seat to Powell." Powell was also nominated by the Co-operative Party.

The Liberal Democrats chose the former City Councillor Marc Ramsbottom on 18 June 2012, declaring the by-election "a two horse race".

On 17 October 2012, the Conservative Party chose Matthew Sephton, Chairman of LGBTory and Deputy Chairman of the party in Altrincham and Sale West, as their candidate. Sephton had previously stood as the Conservative candidate in Salford and Eccles during the 2010 general election.

Following a membership meeting the British National Party chose Eddy O'Sullivan as its candidate.

The former Lord Mayor of Norwich Tom Dylan was the Green Party candidate.

Respect initially chose Kate Hudson as its candidate, but she stood down because of George Galloway's comments about rape. On 30 October 2012, local "community advocate" Catherine Higgins was selected as the Respect candidate.

The Trade Unionist and Socialist Coalition announced its intention to contest this by-election (and a council by-election in Liverpool and the election for Mayor of Bristol on the same day) with the PCS Union's North-West vice-chair Alex Davidson chosen on 10 October.

Pirate Party UK chose their Leader, Loz Kaye.

Howling Laud Hope, party leader, stood for the Official Monster Raving Loony Party under the description Monster Raving Loony William Hill Party.

Local factory worker Peter Clifford announced on 21 July that he intended to stand as the Communist League candidate. Clifford told The Guardian newspaper on 8 August that "the power of working people... counts more than an election result."

On 29 August 2012, the newly formed People's Democratic Party announced that its candidate would be the party leader and former Conservative and anti-Iraq War activist, Lee Holmes. Holmes told Mancunian Matters that Manchester politics "represented all that was wrong with British democracy". He admitted to The Guardian that he had never lived in Manchester.

== Results ==
Election	Political result	Candidate	Party	Votes	%	±%
Manchester Central by-election Resignation of Tony Lloyd; Turnout: 16,648 (18.2%) −28.5	Labour Co-op hold Majority: 9,936 (59.7%) +33.6; Swing: 16.8% from Lib Dem to Lab	Lucy Powell	Labour Co-op	11,507	69.1	+16.4
Manchester Central by-election Resignation of Tony Lloyd; Turnout: 16,648 (18.2%) −28.5	Labour Co-op hold Majority: 9,936 (59.7%) +33.6; Swing: 16.8% from Lib Dem to Lab	Marc Ramsbottom	Liberal Democrats	1,571	9.4	−17.2
Manchester Central by-election Resignation of Tony Lloyd; Turnout: 16,648 (18.2%) −28.5	Labour Co-op hold Majority: 9,936 (59.7%) +33.6; Swing: 16.8% from Lib Dem to Lab	Matthew Sephton	Conservative	754	4.5	−7.3
Manchester Central by-election Resignation of Tony Lloyd; Turnout: 16,648 (18.2%) −28.5	Labour Co-op hold Majority: 9,936 (59.7%) +33.6; Swing: 16.8% from Lib Dem to Lab	Chris Cassidy	UKIP	749	4.5	+3.0
Manchester Central by-election Resignation of Tony Lloyd; Turnout: 16,648 (18.2%) −28.5	Labour Co-op hold Majority: 9,936 (59.7%) +33.6; Swing: 16.8% from Lib Dem to Lab	Tom Dylan	Green	652	3.9	+1.6
Manchester Central by-election Resignation of Tony Lloyd; Turnout: 16,648 (18.2%) −28.5	Labour Co-op hold Majority: 9,936 (59.7%) +33.6; Swing: 16.8% from Lib Dem to Lab	Eddy O'Sullivan	BNP	492	3.0	−1.1
Manchester Central by-election Resignation of Tony Lloyd; Turnout: 16,648 (18.2%) −28.5	Labour Co-op hold Majority: 9,936 (59.7%) +33.6; Swing: 16.8% from Lib Dem to Lab	Loz Kaye	Pirate	308	1.9	N/A
Manchester Central by-election Resignation of Tony Lloyd; Turnout: 16,648 (18.2%) −28.5	Labour Co-op hold Majority: 9,936 (59.7%) +33.6; Swing: 16.8% from Lib Dem to Lab	Alex Davidson	TUSC	220	1.3	N/A
Manchester Central by-election Resignation of Tony Lloyd; Turnout: 16,648 (18.2%) −28.5	Labour Co-op hold Majority: 9,936 (59.7%) +33.6; Swing: 16.8% from Lib Dem to Lab	Catherine Higgins	Respect	182	1.1	N/A
Manchester Central by-election Resignation of Tony Lloyd; Turnout: 16,648 (18.2%) −28.5	Labour Co-op hold Majority: 9,936 (59.7%) +33.6; Swing: 16.8% from Lib Dem to Lab	Howling Laud Hope	Monster Raving Loony	78	0.5	N/A
Manchester Central by-election Resignation of Tony Lloyd; Turnout: 16,648 (18.2%) −28.5	Labour Co-op hold Majority: 9,936 (59.7%) +33.6; Swing: 16.8% from Lib Dem to Lab	Lee Holmes	People's Democratic Party	71	0.4	N/A
Manchester Central by-election Resignation of Tony Lloyd; Turnout: 16,648 (18.2%) −28.5	Labour Co-op hold Majority: 9,936 (59.7%) +33.6; Swing: 16.8% from Lib Dem to Lab	Peter Clifford	Communist League	64	0.4	N/A
General election 2010; New boundaries Turnout: 39,927 (46.7%) +4.9	Labour hold Majority: 10,430 (26.1%); Swing: 6.1% from Lab to Lib Dem	Tony Lloyd	Labour	21,059	52.7	−6.6
General election 2010; New boundaries Turnout: 39,927 (46.7%) +4.9	Labour hold Majority: 10,430 (26.1%); Swing: 6.1% from Lab to Lib Dem	Marc Ramsbottom	Liberal Democrats	10,620	26.6	+5.6
General election 2010; New boundaries Turnout: 39,927 (46.7%) +4.9	Labour hold Majority: 10,430 (26.1%); Swing: 6.1% from Lab to Lib Dem	Suhail Rahuja	Conservative	4,704	11.8	+1.3
General election 2010; New boundaries Turnout: 39,927 (46.7%) +4.9	Labour hold Majority: 10,430 (26.1%); Swing: 6.1% from Lab to Lib Dem	Tony Trebilcock	BNP	1,636	4.1	N/A
General election 2010; New boundaries Turnout: 39,927 (46.7%) +4.9	Labour hold Majority: 10,430 (26.1%); Swing: 6.1% from Lab to Lib Dem	Gayle O'Donovan	Green	915	2.3	−1.9
General election 2010; New boundaries Turnout: 39,927 (46.7%) +4.9	Labour hold Majority: 10,430 (26.1%); Swing: 6.1% from Lab to Lib Dem	Nicola Weatherill	UKIP	607	1.5	−0.3
General election 2010; New boundaries Turnout: 39,927 (46.7%) +4.9	Labour hold Majority: 10,430 (26.1%); Swing: 6.1% from Lab to Lib Dem	Ron Sinclair	Socialist Labour	153	0.4	−0.2
General election 2010; New boundaries Turnout: 39,927 (46.7%) +4.9	Labour hold Majority: 10,430 (26.1%); Swing: 6.1% from Lab to Lib Dem	John Cartwright	Independent	120	0.3	N/A
General election 2010; New boundaries Turnout: 39,927 (46.7%) +4.9	Labour hold Majority: 10,430 (26.1%); Swing: 6.1% from Lab to Lib Dem	Jonty Leff	Workers Revolutionary	59	0.1	N/A
General election 2010; New boundaries Turnout: 39,927 (46.7%) +4.9	Labour hold Majority: 10,430 (26.1%); Swing: 6.1% from Lab to Lib Dem	Robert Skelton	Socialist Equality	54	0.1	N/A

== See also ==
- List of United Kingdom by-elections
- Opinion polling for the 2015 United Kingdom general election
