= Manchester Central (UK Parliament constituency) =

UK Parliament constituency (since 1974)

Coordinates: 53.469°N 2.240°W

- Borough constituency for the House of Commons
- Interactive map of boundaries since 2024
- Location within North West England
- County: Greater Manchester
- Electorate: 75,311 (March 2020)
- Major settlements: Ardwick, Ancoats, Deansgate, Manchester City Centre, Openshaw, Moston, Failsworth

Current constituency
- Created: 1974
- Member of Parliament: Lucy Powell (Labour Co-op)
- Created from: Manchester Exchange and Manchester Cheetham

Manchester Central is a parliamentary constituency (Note: A borough constituency (for the purposes of election expenses and type of returning officer)) in Greater Manchester created in 1974. The seat has been represented in the House of Commons of the Parliament of the United Kingdom since 2012 by Lucy Powell of the Labour Party and Co-operative Party. (Note: As with all constituencies, the constituency elects one Member of Parliament (MP) by the first past the post system of election at least every five years.) Powell has served as Deputy Leader of the Labour Party since 2025 and Secretary of State for Education since 2026.

== Constituency profile ==
Manchester Central is a constituency in Greater Manchester. It covers the city centre of Manchester and the neighbourhoods to its north and east, including Cheetham, Ancoats, Bradford, Beswick, Clayton, Openshaw and Newton Heath. It also includes the town of Failsworth, which lies outside the city's boundaries and within the Metropolitan Borough of Oldham. Manchester is a major city that grew from textile manufacturing during the Industrial Revolution. The city has undergone strong economic development in the 21st century and is sometimes considered the United Kingdom's "second city". This constituency contains Etihad Stadium, the home of Manchester City F.C. There are high levels of deprivation here; the city centre and Failsworth are wealthier however the rest of the constituency falls within the top 10% most-deprived areas in England. The city centre houses many students and young professionals whilst the surrounding neighbourhoods contain a high quantity of low-income council housing. House prices are similar to the rest of North West England and lower than the national average.

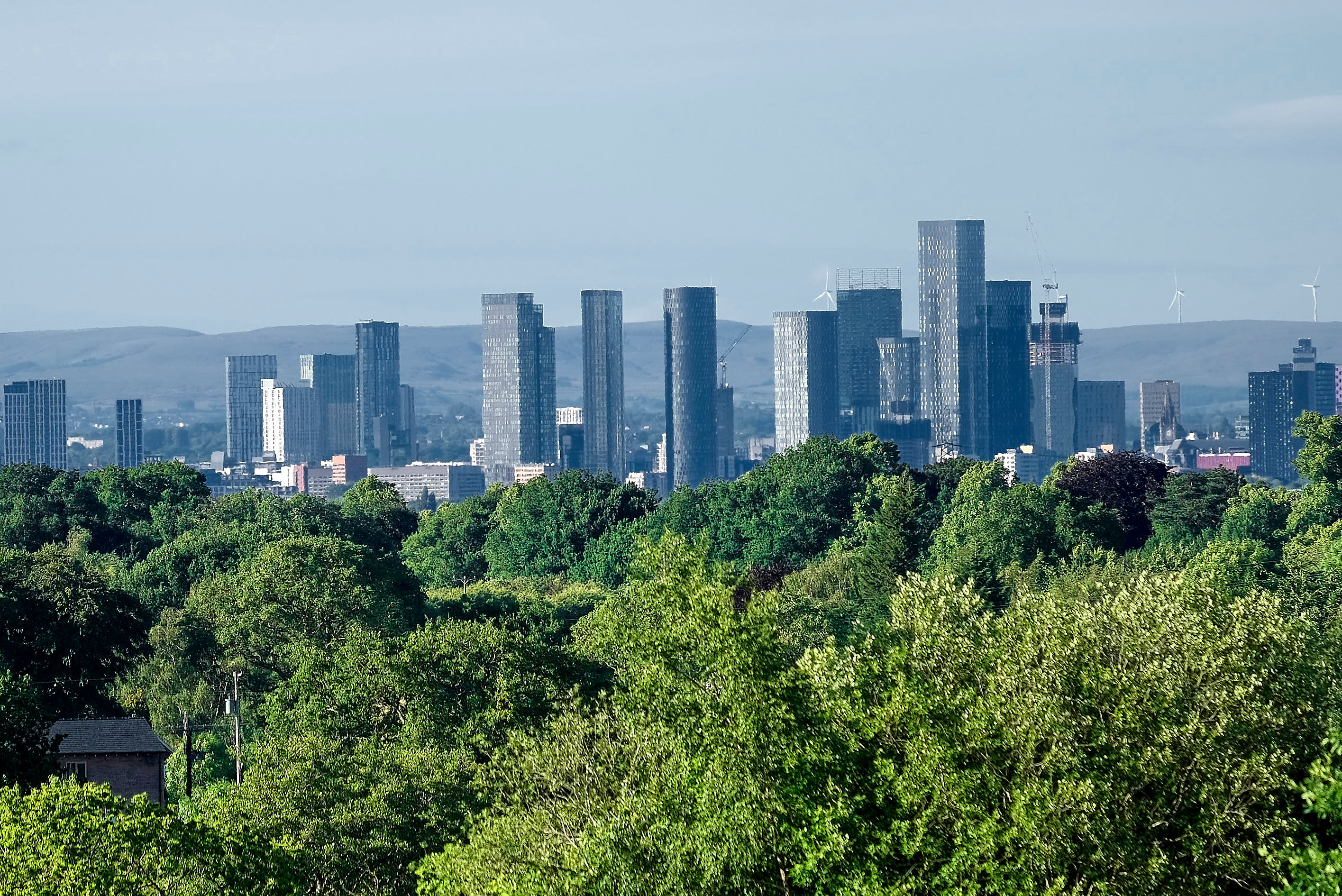
Manchester City Centre

In general, residents of Manchester Central are very young and well-educated. They have low rates of homeownership and household income, and a high proportion of residents work in science, technology and finance. The constituency has high rates of unemployment and child poverty. White people made up 61% of the population at the 2021 census. Asians were 18%, including large Pakistani and Chinese communities, and Black people were 12%. The ethnic minority population is mostly concentrated in Cheetham and Openshaw whilst Failsworth is around 90% White. Most of the constituency is represented by the Labour Party at the local council level, although Liberal Democrats were elected in Beswick and local independents in Failsworth. An estimated 53% of voters supported remaining in the European Union in the 2016 referendum, higher than the nationwide figure of 48%.

== History ==
Creation

The main forerunner to the seat was Manchester Cheetham, entirely taken into this area; three of the five wards of former seat Manchester Exchange completed the first set of boundaries of the seat. The seat (including predecessor seats) has been held by the Labour Party since 1945.

Political history

Labour candidates have won Manchester Central by a decidedly non-marginal majority since its 1974 creation. The current MP Lucy Powell won the seat at a by-election in November 2012 on a turnout of 18%; the lowest since the Second World War.

Results of other parties

Failsworth, in the Borough of Oldham, and one of the more residential eastern outskirts of the constituency, was added to the Manchester Central constituency in 2024.

The 2015 general election saw greater-than-national-average swing of +3.4% (by a swing of +6.2%) to the Green Party candidate, achieving third place. Followed next by UKIP in 2015 by number of votes cast (prior to the 2016 UK EU membership referendum, votes cast for the Liberal Democrats – who for two periods had been the runner-up party in Manchester Central – for the first time placed its candidate in fifth place. The Conservative Party returned to second place in 2015 through candidate Xingang Wang (achieving 13.5% of the vote); its second place of 1979 was through its best polling to date of 22.1% of the vote. The maximal second place to date was in 2010, when Liberal Democrat candidate Marc Ramsbottom took 26.6% of the vote.

Turnout

Turnout has changed from a national low within the 2010 general election (of 46.7%) to 55.1% of electors. The greatest turnout was in 1987, with 63.9%.

== Boundaries ==
Map of boundaries 2010-24

=== Historic ===
Manchester Central in Lancashire, boundaries used 1974–1983

1974–1983: The County Borough of Manchester wards of Beswick, Cheetham, Collegiate Church, Harpurhey, and Miles Platting.

1983–1997: The City of Manchester wards of Ardwick, Beswick and Clayton, Bradford, Central, Cheetham, Hulme, and Newton Heath.

1997–2010: As above, less Cheetham, plus Moss Side, and Whalley Range.

2010–2024: The City of Manchester wards of Ancoats & Clayton, Ardwick, Bradford, City Centre, Hulme, Miles Platting and Newton Heath, Moss Side, and Moston using the 2004–2018 boundaries.

=== Current ===
Further to the 2023 review of Westminster constituencies which came into effect for the 2024 general election, the constituency is composed of the following (as they existed on 1 December 2020):

- The City of Manchester wards of: Ancoats & Beswick; Cheetham; Clayton & Openshaw; Deansgate; Miles Platting & Newton Heath; Piccadilly.
- The Metropolitan Borough of Oldham wards of: Failsworth East; Failsworth West.

The content of the constituency was subject to major changes, losing about half its electorate, mainly to the re-established constituency of Manchester Rusholme, including the districts of Ardwick, Hulme and Moss Side. Moston was transferred to Blackley and Middleton South (formerly Blackley and Broughton) in exchange for Cheetham, and the two Failsworth wards were transferred from Ashton-under-Lyne.

== Members of Parliament ==
| Election | Member | Party | Notes |
|---|---|---|---|
| Feb 1974 | Harold Lever | Labour | MP for Manchester Exchange from 1945 and for Manchester Cheetham from 1950. Resigned July 1979 on being raised to the peerage |
| 1979 by-election | Bob Litherland | Labour | |
| 1997 | Tony Lloyd | Labour | MP for Stretford from 1983. Resigned October 2012 to run for Greater Manchester Police and Crime Commissioner. MP for Rochdale from 2017 to 2024 |
| 2012 by-election | Lucy Powell | Labour Co-op | Deputy Leader of the Labour Party since 2025 |

== Elections ==
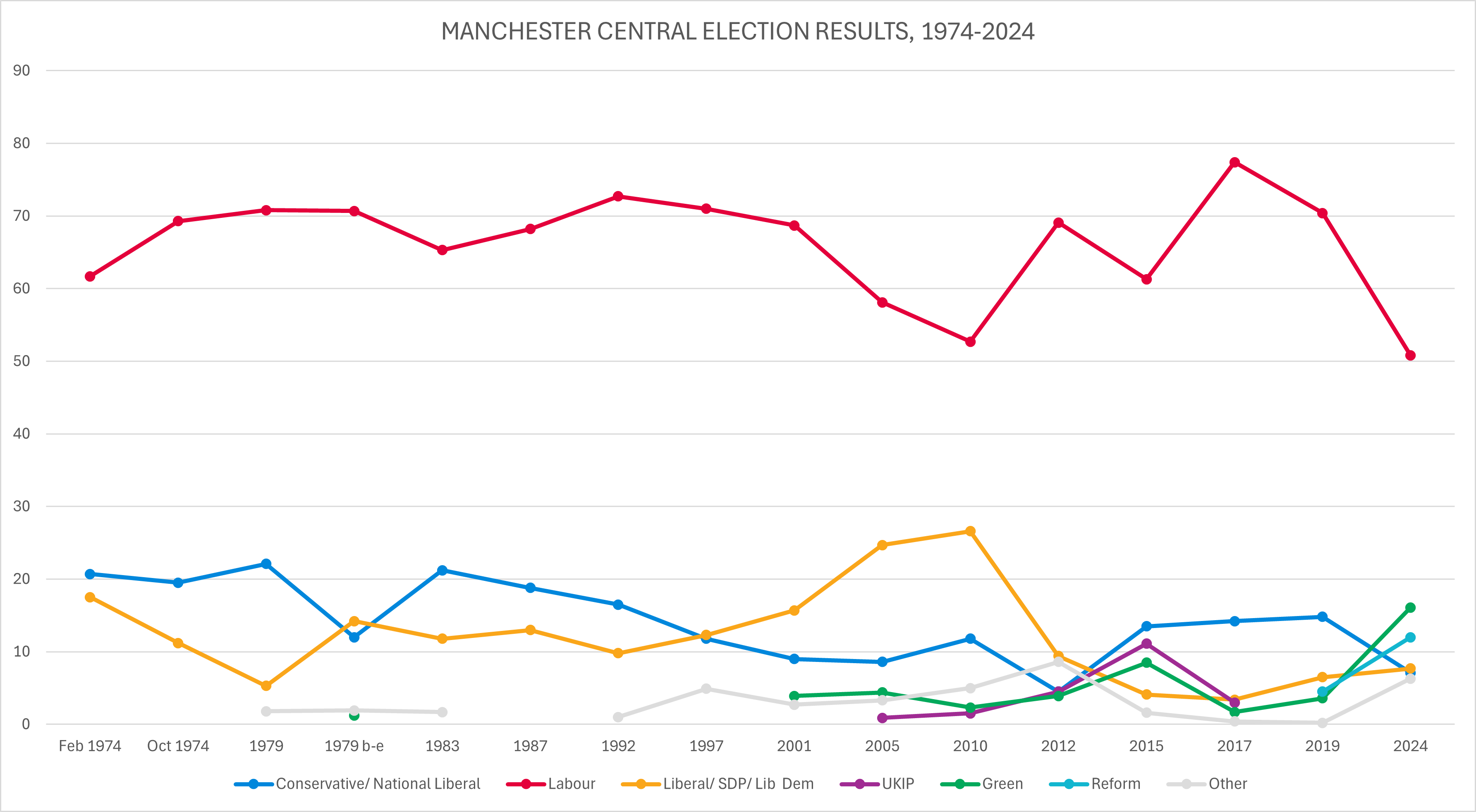
Election results 1974-2024

=== Elections in the 2020s ===
General election 2024: Manchester Central
| Party | Candidate | Votes | % | ±% |
|---|---|---|---|---|
| Labour Co-op | Lucy Powell | 20,184 | 50.8 | −14.6 |
| Green | Ekua Bayunu | 6,387 | 16.1 | +13.2 |
| Reform | David Brown | 4,760 | 12.0 | +7.6 |
| Liberal Democrats | Chris Northwood | 3,051 | 7.7 | +1.7 |
| Conservative | Scott Smith | 2,823 | 7.1 | −13.9 |
| Workers Party | Parham Hashemi | 1,888 | 4.8 | N/A |
| SDP | Sebastian Moore | 240 | 0.6 | N/A |
| Independent | Sabeena Khan | 202 | 0.5 | N/A |
| Communist Future | Catriona Rylance | 131 | 0.3 | N/A |
| Independent | Albati Kalonda | 59 | 0.1 | N/A |
| Majority | | 13,797 | 34.7 | –9.7 |
| Turnout | | 39,725 | 46.7 | –7.1 |
| Registered electors | | 85,049 | | |
| Labour Co-op hold | | Swing | ▼13.9 | |

=== Elections in the 2010s ===
2019 notional result
| Party | Vote | % |
|---|---|---|
| Labour | 26,470 | 65.4 |
| Conservative | 8,500 | 21.0 |
| Liberal Democrats | 2,449 | 6.0 |
| Brexit Party | 1,795 | 4.4 |
| Green | 1,159 | 2.9 |
| Others | 107 | 0.3 |
| Turnout | 40,480 | 53.8 |
| Electorate | 75,311 | |

General election 2019: Manchester Central
| Party | Candidate | Votes | % | ±% |
|---|---|---|---|---|
| Labour Co-op | Lucy Powell | 36,823 | 70.4 | –7.0 |
| Conservative | Shaden Jaradat | 7,734 | 14.8 | +0.6 |
| Liberal Democrats | John Bridges | 3,420 | 6.5 | +3.1 |
| Brexit Party | Sarah Chadwick | 2,335 | 4.5 | N/A |
| Green | Melanie Horrocks | 1,870 | 3.6 | +1.9 |
| Socialist Equality | Dennis Leech | 107 | 0.2 | N/A |
| Majority | | 29,089 | 55.6 | –7.6 |
| Turnout | | 52,289 | 56.9 | +1.8 |
| Labour Co-op hold | | Swing | –3.8 | |

General election 2017: Manchester Central
| Party | Candidate | Votes | % | ±% |
|---|---|---|---|---|
| Labour Co-op | Lucy Powell | 38,490 | 77.4 | +16.1 |
| Conservative | Xingang Wang | 7,045 | 14.2 | +0.7 |
| Liberal Democrats | John Bridges | 1,678 | 3.4 | –0.7 |
| UKIP | Kalvin Chapman | 1,469 | 3.0 | –8.1 |
| Green | Rachael Shah | 846 | 1.7 | –6.8 |
| Pirate | Neil Blackburn | 192 | 0.4 | –0.4 |
| Majority | | 31,445 | 63.2 | +14.4 |
| Turnout | | 49,720 | 55.1 | +2.4 |
| Labour Co-op hold | | Swing | +7.7 | |

General election 2015: Manchester Central
| Party | Candidate | Votes | % | ±% |
|---|---|---|---|---|
| Labour Co-op | Lucy Powell | 27,772 | 61.3 | +8.6 |
| Conservative | Xingang Wang | 6,133 | 13.5 | +1.7 |
| UKIP | Myles Power | 5,033 | 11.1 | +9.6 |
| Green | Kieran Turner-Dave | 3,838 | 8.5 | +6.2 |
| Liberal Democrats | John Reid | 1,867 | 4.1 | –22.5 |
| Pirate | Loz Kaye | 346 | 0.8 | N/A |
| TUSC | Alex Davidson | 270 | 0.6 | N/A |
| Communist League | John Davies | 72 | 0.2 | N/A |
| Majority | | 21,639 | 47.8 | +21.7 |
| Turnout | | 45,331 | 52.7 | +6.0 |
| Labour Co-op hold | | Swing | +3.4 | |

By-election 2012: Manchester Central
| Party | Candidate | Votes | % | ±% |
|---|---|---|---|---|
| Labour Co-op | Lucy Powell | 11,507 | 69.1 | +16.4 |
| Liberal Democrats | Marc Ramsbottom | 1,571 | 9.4 | –17.2 |
| Conservative | Matthew Sephton | 754 | 4.5 | –7.3 |
| UKIP | Christopher Cassidy | 749 | 4.5 | +3.0 |
| Green | Tom Dylan | 652 | 3.9 | +1.6 |
| BNP | Eddy O'Sullivan | 492 | 3.0 | –1.1 |
| Pirate | Loz Kaye | 308 | 1.9 | N/A |
| TUSC | Alex Davidson | 220 | 1.3 | N/A |
| Respect | Catherine Higgins | 182 | 1.1 | N/A |
| Monster Raving Loony | Howling Laud Hope | 78 | 0.5 | N/A |
| People's Democratic Party | Lee Holmes | 71 | 0.4 | N/A |
| Communist League | Peter Clifford | 64 | 0.4 | N/A |
| Majority | | 9,936 | 59.7 | +33.6 |
| Turnout | | 16,648 | 18.2 | −28.5 |
| Labour Co-op hold | | Swing | | |

General election 2010: Manchester Central
| Party | Candidate | Votes | % | ±% |
|---|---|---|---|---|
| Labour | Tony Lloyd | 21,059 | 52.7 | −6.6 |
| Liberal Democrats | Marc Ramsbottom | 10,620 | 26.6 | +5.6 |
| Conservative | Suhail Rahuja | 4,704 | 11.8 | +1.3 |
| BNP | Tony Trebilcock | 1,636 | 4.1 | N/A |
| Green | Gayle O'Donovan | 915 | 2.3 | −1.9 |
| UKIP | Nicola Weatherill | 607 | 1.5 | +0.6 |
| Socialist Labour | Ron Sinclair | 153 | 0.4 | −0.2 |
| Independent | John Cartwright | 120 | 0.3 | N/A |
| Workers Revolutionary | Jonty Leff | 59 | 0.1 | N/A |
| Socialist Equality | Robert Skelton | 54 | 0.1 | N/A |
| Majority | | 10,430 | 26.1 | −12.2 |
| Turnout | | 39,927 | 46.7 | +4.9 |
| Labour hold | | Swing | −6.1 | |

This was the lowest turnout for any constituency in the whole of the United Kingdom in 2010

=== Elections in the 2000s ===
General election 2005: Manchester Central
| Party | Candidate | Votes | % | ±% |
|---|---|---|---|---|
| Labour Co-op | Tony Lloyd | 16,993 | 58.1 | −10.6 |
| Liberal Democrats | Marc Ramsbottom | 7,217 | 24.7 | +9.0 |
| Conservative | Tom Jackson | 2,504 | 8.6 | −0.4 |
| Green | Steven Durrant | 1,292 | 4.4 | +0.5 |
| National Front | Richard Kemp | 421 | 1.4 | N/A |
| Independent Progressive Labour | Damien O'Connor | 382 | 1.3 | N/A |
| UKIP | John Whittaker | 272 | 0.9 | N/A |
| Socialist Labour | Ronald Sinclair | 183 | 0.6 | −1.3 |
| Majority | | 9,776 | 33.4 | −19.6 |
| Turnout | | 29,264 | 42.0 | +2.9 |
| Labour hold | | Swing | −9.8 | |

General election 2001: Manchester Central
| Party | Candidate | Votes | % | ±% |
|---|---|---|---|---|
| Labour | Tony Lloyd | 17,812 | 68.7 | −2.3 |
| Liberal Democrats | Phylip Hobson | 4,070 | 15.7 | +3.4 |
| Conservative | Aaron Powell | 2,328 | 9.0 | −2.8 |
| Green | Vanessa Hall | 1,018 | 3.9 | N/A |
| Socialist Labour | Ron Sinclair | 484 | 1.9 | −0.5 |
| ProLife Alliance | Terrenia Brosnan | 216 | 0.8 | N/A |
| Majority | | 13,742 | 53.0 | −5.7 |
| Turnout | | 25,928 | 39.1 | −12.5 |
| Labour Co-op hold | | Swing | −3.9 | |

=== Elections in the 1990s ===
General election 1997: Manchester Central
| Party | Candidate | Votes | % | ±% |
|---|---|---|---|---|
| Labour | Tony Lloyd | 23,803 | 71.0 | −1.7 |
| Liberal Democrats | Alison Firth | 4,121 | 12.3 | +2.5 |
| Conservative | Simon McIlwaine | 3,964 | 11.8 | −4.7 |
| Socialist Labour | Francis Rafferty | 810 | 2.4 | N/A |
| Referendum | John Maxwell | 742 | 2.2 | N/A |
| Communist League | Timothy Rigby | 97 | 0.3 | −0.2 |
| Majority | | 19,682 | 58.7 | |
| Turnout | | 33,537 | 52.6 | −4.3 |
| Labour hold | | Swing | +1.5 | |

General election 1992: Manchester Central
| Party | Candidate | Votes | % | ±% |
|---|---|---|---|---|
| Labour | Bob Litherland | 23,336 | 72.7 | +4.5 |
| Conservative | Peter Davies | 5,299 | 16.5 | −2.3 |
| Liberal Democrats | Richard Clayton | 3,151 | 9.8 | −3.2 |
| Natural Law | Vivienne Mitchell | 167 | 0.5 | N/A |
| Communist League | Andrew Buchanan | 167 | 0.5 | N/A |
| Majority | | 18,037 | 56.2 | +6.8 |
| Turnout | | 32,120 | 56.9 | −7.0 |
| Labour hold | | Swing | +3.4 | |

=== Elections in the 1980s ===
General election 1987: Manchester Central
| Party | Candidate | Votes | % | ±% |
|---|---|---|---|---|
| Labour | Bob Litherland | 27,428 | 68.2 | +2.9 |
| Conservative | Matthew Banks | 7,561 | 18.8 | −2.4 |
| SDP | Barry McColgan | 5,250 | 13.0 | +1.2 |
| Majority | | 19,867 | 49.4 | +5.3 |
| Turnout | | 40,239 | 63.9 | +3.3 |
| Labour hold | | Swing | +2.7 | |

General election 1983: Manchester Central
| Party | Candidate | Votes | % | ±% |
|---|---|---|---|---|
| Labour | Bob Litherland | 27,353 | 65.3 | −6.7 |
| Conservative | David Eager | 8,868 | 21.2 | +1.4 |
| SDP | Altaf Ahmad | 4,956 | 11.8 | +5.1 |
| National Front | Alfred Coles | 729 | 1.7 | −0.1 |
| Majority | | 18,485 | 44.1 | −4.6 |
| Turnout | | 41,906 | 60.6 | −2.9 |
| Labour hold | | Swing | | |

=== Elections in the 1970s ===
Manchester Central by-election 1979
| Party | Candidate | Votes | % | ±% |
|---|---|---|---|---|
| Labour | Bob Litherland | 7,494 | 70.7 | −0.1 |
| Liberal | Anthony Parkinson | 1,502 | 14.2 | +8.9 |
| Conservative | Stephen Lea | 1,275 | 12.0 | −10.1 |
| Independent Labour | Syed Ala-Ud-Din | 187 | 1.8 | N/A |
| Ecology | John Foster | 129 | 1.2 | N/A |
| Democratic Monarchist, Public Safety, White Resident. | Bill Boaks | 12 | 0.1 | N/A |
| Majority | | 5,992 | 56.5 | +7.8 |
| Turnout | | 10,599 | 33.8 | −29.9 |
| Labour hold | | Swing | | |

General election 1979: Manchester Central
| Party | Candidate | Votes | % | ±% |
|---|---|---|---|---|
| Labour | Harold Lever | 14,117 | 70.8 | +1.5 |
| Conservative | Herbert Cummins | 4,413 | 22.1 | +2.6 |
| Liberal | Gordon Wilmott | 1,052 | 5.3 | −5.9 |
| National Front | Derek Benthall | 365 | 1.8 | N/A |
| Majority | | 9,704 | 48.7 | −1.1 |
| Turnout | | 19,947 | 63.7 | +10.3 |
| Labour hold | | Swing | | |

General election October 1974: Manchester Central
| Party | Candidate | Votes | % | ±% |
|---|---|---|---|---|
| Labour | Harold Lever | 14,753 | 69.3 | +7.6 |
| Conservative | Robert Jackson | 4,142 | 19.5 | −1.2 |
| Liberal | Patrick Coleman | 2,382 | 11.2 | −6.3 |
| Majority | | 10,611 | 49.8 | +8.8 |
| Turnout | | 21,277 | 53.4 | −8.4 |
| Labour hold | | Swing | | |

General election February 1974: Manchester Central
| Party | Candidate | Votes | % | ±% |
|---|---|---|---|---|
| Labour | Harold Lever | 15,075 | 61.7 | |
| Conservative | Christopher Horne | 5,071 | 20.7 | |
| Liberal | Michael Steed | 4,281 | 17.5 | |
| Majority | | 10,004 | 41.0 | |
| Turnout | | 24,427 | 61.8 | |
| Labour win (new seat) | | | | |

== See also ==
- Parliamentary constituencies in Greater Manchester
