= Women in law in the United Kingdom =

Prior to the 20th century, there were few women in law in the United Kingdom. Prior to the Sex Disqualification (Removal) Act 1919, women were not permitted to practice law in the United Kingdom. By 1931 there were around 100 female solicitors. The first female-only law partnership was founded in 1933. In 2010, a report by The Lawyer found that 22 percent of partners at the UK's top 100 firms were women; a follow-up report in 2015 found that figure had not changed. Since 2014, a number of large corporate firms of solicitors have set gender diversity targets to increase the percentage of women within their partnerships. By 2019, 51% of British solicitors were women.

== Background ==
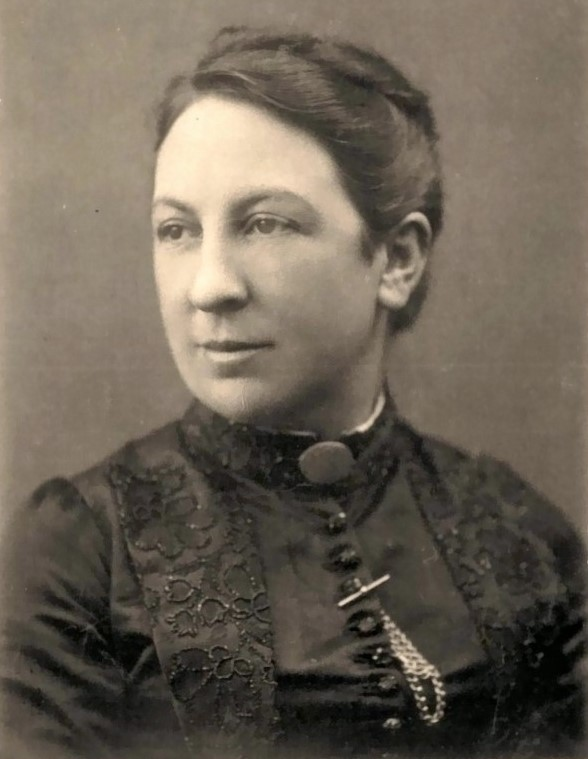
Eliza Orme circa 1900

=== Law degree ===
Eliza Orme was the first woman in the United Kingdom to obtain a law degree, in 1888. She was not called to the English Bar until later in the 1920s after the first female pioneers. In 1889, Letitia Alice Walkington became the first woman to graduate with a degree of Bachelor of Laws in Great Britain or Ireland. In 1892, Cornelia Sorabji became the first woman to study law at Oxford University. Dorothy Bonarjee became the first female to earn a law degree from the University College London in 1917.

=== Barristers and solicitors ===
In 1903, Bertha Cave applied to join Gray's Inn; the application was ultimately rejected. In 1913, the Law Society refused to allow women to take legal exams; this was challenged in the Court of Appeal in the case of Bebb v The Law Society (1914), where the Law Society's stance was upheld. The plaintiff in that case was Gwyneth Bebb, who was expected to be the first female to be called to the bar but died before that could happen. The Sex Disqualification (Removal) Act 1919 received Royal Assent on 23 December 1919. The next day, Helena Normanton became the first woman to join an Inns of Court.

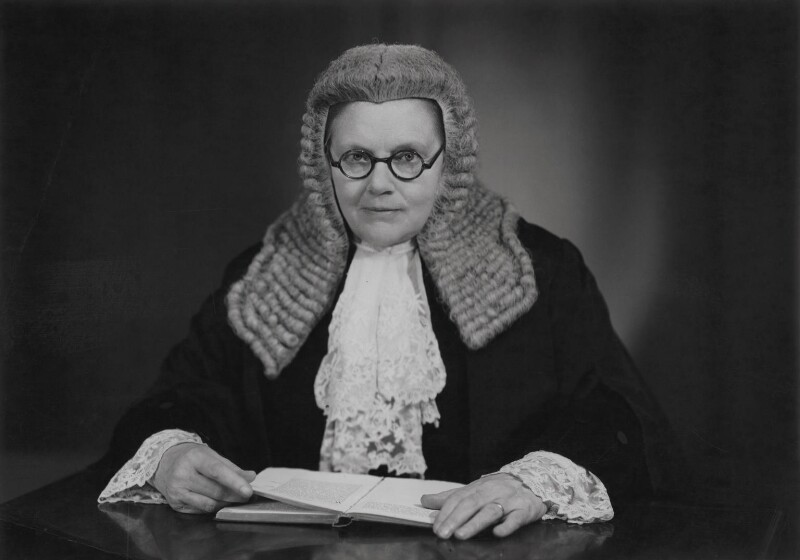
Helena Normanton circa 1950

Thus, in 1922, Ivy Williams was the first woman called to the bar (although she never practiced), and Helena Normanton became the first practising female barrister in the UK. In September 2018 a barristers' chambers was renamed in her honour. Williams was also the first woman to teach law at an English university, On November 19, 1923, (Maria) Alice Phillips became the first Jewish woman barrister in England and Wales, called to the bar by Middle Temple. In 2022, Jessikah Inaba became the first Black visually-impaired (female) barrister in the United Kingdom.

Regarding solicitors, Madge Easton Anderson became the first female solicitor in the United Kingdom in 1920 upon being admitted to practice law in Scotland. In 1922, Carrie Morrison, Mary Pickup, Mary Sykes, and Maud Crofts became the first women in England to qualify as solicitors; Morrison was the first of them admitted as a solicitor. Kathleen Hoahing became the first woman to qualify as a solicitor in Britain in 1927, though she would relocate soon afterwards to China. In 2006, Eleanor Sharpston became the first female from UK appointed as an Advocate General of the European Court of Justice.

==== Senior advocate or barrister ====
Helena Normanton and Rose Heilbron became the first two female barristers in England and Wales to be appointed King's Counsel in 1949. (though Margaret Kidd, a Scottish advocate, had been appointed KC the previous year). Heilbron was also the first woman to achieve a first class honours degree in law at the University of Liverpool (in 1935), England's first woman judge as Recorder of Burnley (in 1956), the first woman to sit as a judge in the Old Bailey (in 1972), and the second female High Court judge (in 1974). Patricia Scotland was the first Black female to become a Queen's Counsel in the United Kingdom in 1991. Kim Hollis became the first Asian female barrister to become Queen's Counsel in 2002 in the United Kingdom.

==== Law society ====
In 2002, the Law Society appointed its first female president, Carolyn Kirby. In 2021, Stephanie Boyce became the first Black female president of the Law Society. In 2022, Lubna Shuja became the first Asian and Muslim (female) president of the Law Society.

=== Judicial officers ===
Upon the passing of the Sex Disqualification (Removal) Act 1919, Ada Summers was the first female appointed as an ex officio Justice of the Peace in the United Kingdom due to her position as the Mayor of Stalybridge. Moreover, the following seven women became the first Justices of the Peace: Lady Crewe, Lady Londonderry, Margaret Lloyd George, Gertrude Tuckwell, Mary Augusta Ward, Elizabeth Haldane, and Beatrice Webb. At the end of 1919, Violet Markham and Cécile Matheson were appointed to the Industrial Court (a quasi-legal body akin to employment arbitration), which required female participation as part of the Industrial Courts Act 1919.

Elizabeth Lane (1940) became the first female County Court judge (1962), and the first English High Court judge (1965). Although not a barrister, Pauline Henriques became the United Kingdom's first Black female magistrate in 1966. Chand Lal-Sarin became Britain's first female magistrate of Indian-origin in 1970. In 1978, Rose Heilbron became the first woman to become the Presiding Judge of any Circuit when she was appointed to the Northern Circuit. Linda Dobbs became the first Black (female) High Court judge in 2004. In 2015, Bobbie Cheema-Grubb became the first Asian (female) High Court judge In 2020, Raffia Arshad became the first hijab-wearing court judge in the United Kingdom.

Baroness Hale became the first female Justice (2009) and president (2017) of the Supreme Court. She was also the first female to become a Law Lord in the House of Lords of the United Kingdom of Great Britain and Northern Ireland in 2004.

== Key women in UK law ==
=== England and Wales ===
- Emily Duncan: First female magistrate appointed in England to issue certificates in lunacy cases (1913)
- Agnes Twiston Hughes (1923): First female solicitor in Wales
- Maria Alice Phillips (née Westell) (1923): First Jewish female barrister in England and Wales
- Sybil Campbell (1922): First female judge (appointed as a magistrate) in England (1945)
- Rose Heilbron (1939): First female appointed as a Judge of the Central Criminal Court of England and Wales (Old Bailey) (1972)
- Heather Hallett, Baroness Hallett: First female to serve as the Chair of the General Council of the Bar (1997)
- Harriet Harman (c. 1978): First female appointed as the Solicitor-General of England and Wales (2001)
- Barbara Mensah: First British-Ghanaian (female) to serve as a circuit court judge in England and Wales (2005)
- June Venters: First female solicitor to become Queen's Counsel (QC) in England and Wales (2006)
- Sue Carr: First woman to head the judiciary of England and Wales since the inception of the office in the 13th century (2023)
- Liz Truss: First female Lord (Lady) Chancellor (2016)

=== Northern Ireland ===
- Sheelagh Murnaghan (1947): First female barrister in Northern Ireland
- Eilis McDermott (1974): First female lawyer to become a Queen's Counsel (QC) in Northern Ireland
- Corinne Philpott (1977): First female judge in Northern Ireland (upon her appointment as a County Court Judge in 1998)
- Denise McBride (1988) and Siobhan Keegan (1993): First females appointed as Judges of the High Court of Justice in Northern Ireland (2015)
- Siobhan Keegan (1993): First female Chief Justice of the High Court of Justice in Northern Ireland (2021)
- Patricia Scotland (1977): First female appointed as the Attorney General of England, Wales and Northern Ireland (2007)

=== Scotland ===
- Eveline MacLaren and Josephine Gordon Stuart: First female law graduates in Scotland. They both obtained an LLB degree in 1909 from the Faculty of Law at Edinburgh Law School.
- Margaret Kidd (1923): First female member admitted to the Scottish Bar. She was also the first female appointed as KC in the United Kingdom (appointed 1948), and the first female advocate to appear before the House of Lords and before a parliamentary select committee.
- Aileen M. Paterson (1926): First female to serve as a Procurator Fiscal in Scotland (1930)
- Hazel Cosgrove, Lady Cosgrove (c. 1966): First female appointed as a High Court Judge and a Senator in the College of Justice (1996). She was also the first female to be appointed to the Inner House of the Court of Session (i.e. as an appellate judge) (2006).
- Lynda Clark, Baroness Clark of Calton: First (female) to serve as the Advocate General for Scotland (1999)
- Elish Angiolini (1983): First female lawyer to become the Solicitor General for Scotland (2001) and Lord Advocate of Scotland (2006)

==== Other notable figures in Scotland ====
- Leeona Dorrian, Lady Dorrian - Lord Justice Clerk, the second most senior judge in Scotland
- Anne Smith, Lady Smith - High Court Judge and Senator of the College of Justice
- Ann Paton, Lady Paton - High Court Judge and Senator of the College of Justice. Currently Scotland's longest-serving female judge.
- Valerie Stacey, Lady Stacey - Supreme Court Judge and Senator of the College of Justice. The first woman elected Vice-Dean of the Faculty of Advocates.
- Maggie Scott, Lady Scott - Abdelbaset al-Megrahi's lead counsel, a Judge and Senator of the College of Justice
- Morag Wise, Lady Wise - Supreme Court Judge and Senator of the College of Justice
- Rita Rae, Lady Rae - Supreme Court Judge and Senator of the College of Justice
- Ailsa Carmichael, Lady Carmichael - Judge and Senator of the College of Justice
- Sarah P. L. Wolffe, Lady Wolffe - first woman to be appointed as a Commercial Judge
- Lorna Jack - Chief Executive at the Law Society since January 2009

=== British Overseas Territories or Crown Dependencies ===
==== Anguilla ====
- Arlene Magdalene Fraites-Gomez (1962): First female lawyer called to the Bar of St. Kitts and Nevis (then St. Kitts, Nevis and Anguilla)
- Monica Theresa Joseph: First female appointed as a Justice of the Eastern Caribbean Supreme Court (1982). The appointment made Joseph the first (female) resident judge in the British Virgin Islands and Anguilla.
- Birnie Stephenson-Brooks: First female to serve as president of the Anguilla Bar Association (1996)
- Nicole Sylvester: First female to serve as the president of the Organization of Eastern Caribbean States (OECS) Bar Association (c. 2007)
- Janice Pereira (British Virgin Islands, 1981): First female (and British Virgin Islander) justice appointed as the Chief Justice of the Eastern Caribbean Supreme Court (2012)

==== Bermuda ====
- Lois Browne-Evans (1953): First female lawyer in Bermuda, as well as Bermuda's first female Attorney General (1999)
- Priya De Soya: First female to become Crown Counsel in Bermuda (1976)
- Dianna Kempe (1973): First female magistrate in Bermuda (1976). She was also the first female lawyer to become Queen's Counsel (QC) in Bermuda (2000). Kempe was too the first female President of the Bermuda Bar Association (1987) and International Bar Association (2000).
- Norma Wade-Miller (1977): First female appointed as a substantive (permanent) magistrate in Bermuda (1981). She was also the first female Judge of the High Court, Justice of the Supreme Court of Bermuda and Acting Chief Justice in Bermuda.
- Arlene Brock: First (female) Ombudsman for Bermuda (2005)
- Patricia Dangor: First female to serve as a Judge of the Bermuda Court of Appeals (2014)
- Karen Williams-Smith: First Black female to serve as the president of the Bermuda Bar Association (2017)
- Cindy Clarke: First female to serve as the Director of Public Prosecutions in Bermuda (2020)
- Maxanne J. Anderson: First female appointed as a Senior Magistrate & Coroner in Bermuda (2022)

==== British Virgin Islands ====
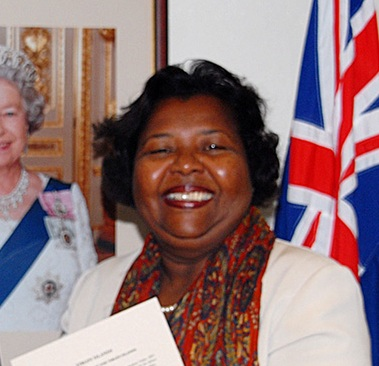
Dancia Penn: First female lawyer in the British Virgin Islands

- Dancia Penn: First female lawyer in the British Virgin Islands. She became the first British Virgin Islander female to be appointed Attorney General of the British Virgin Islands in 1992.
- Paula F. Beaubrun: First female Attorney General of the British Virgin Islands (c. 1970s)
- Monica Theresa Joseph: First female appointed as a Justice of the Eastern Caribbean Supreme Court (1982). The appointment made Joseph the first (female) resident judge in the British Virgin Islands and Anguilla.
- Hélène-Anne Lewis: First female to serve as the President of the BVI Bar Association (2001)
- Nicole Sylvester: First female to serve as the president of the Organization of Eastern Caribbean States (OECS) Bar Association (c. 2007)
- Janice Pereira (British Virgin Islands, 1981): First British Virgin Islander (female) appointed as a Judge of the Court of the BVI Court of Appeal (2009) and the Chief Justice of the Eastern Caribbean Supreme Court (2012)
- Allison Hermia Tench-Donovan (2022): First female barrister to specialize in maritime law in the British Virgin Islands

==== Cayman Islands ====
- Annie Huldah Bodden (1959): First female to qualify as a lawyer in the Cayman Islands
- Adrianne Webb (1975): First female lawyer called to the Caymanian Bar Association
- Theresa Lewis Pitcairn: First female to serve as the president of the Caymanian Bar Association (2001)
- Priya Levers: First female to serve as a Judge of the Cayman Islands Grand Court (2003)
- Cheryll Richards: First (female) Director of Public Prosecutions for the Cayman Islands (2011). In 2010, Richards became the first female Queen's Counsel (QC) in the Cayman Islands.
- Sandy Hermiston: First (female) Ombudsman for the Cayman Islands (2017)
- Margaret Ramsay-Hale: First female to serve as the Chief Justice of the Cayman Islands (2022)
- Marilyn Brandt: First Caymanian (female) attorney to serve as the Deputy Solicitor General in the Portfolio of Legal Affairs (2022)

==== Channel Islands ====
- Sarah Kelly (1997): First female advocate appointed Greffier to the Jurats of Alderney (2005–2012)
- Rosalyn Brelsford (1966): First female advocate in Guernsey
- Cherry McMillen: First female to serve as Judge of the Magistrate's Court of Guernsey (2004)
- Clare Tee: First female to serve as the Batonniere (President) of the Guernsey Bar (c. 2017)
- Jessica Roland: First female to serve as a Deputy Bailiff (2019) and Bailiff of Guernsey (2026)
- Anita Sarella Regal: First female admitted as an advocate of the Royal Court of Jersey (1968)
- Barbara Myles: First female (non-attorney) jurat in Jersey (1980–2001)
- Bridget Shaw: First female magistrate in Jersey (2013)
- Rose Colley: First female to serve as the president of the Law Society of Jersey (2020)

==== Falkland Islands ====
- Rosie McIlroy: First woman lawyer (non-native) to enter into private law practice in the Falkland Islands. According to various sources, her legal career also included serving as Crown Solicitor (c. 1987), Senior Magistrate (c. 1989), and Chief Magistrate (c. 1989) in the Falkland Islands.
- Melanie Louise Best Chilton: First woman lawyer (non-native) to serve as Law Commissioner and an Attorney General of the Falkland Islands (2006-2007).
- Rosalind Catriona Cheek (United Kingdom, 1998): First Falkland Islander female to become Principal Crown Counsel (2006). She later became the second female Law Commissioner in the Falkland Islands (2015).

==== Gibraltar ====
- Pamela Benady (1955): First female barrister (who was of Jewish descent) in Gibraltar
- Dorothy Ellicott: First female Justice of the Peace in Gibraltar (1970)
- Karen Ramagge Prescott (1988): First female judge (a Gibraltarian) in Gibraltar (upon her appointment as a Puisne Justice of the Supreme Court of Gibraltar in 2010). She later became the first female Bencher of the Middle Temple (2017).
- Gillian Guzman (1994): First female Queen's Counsel (QC) in Gibraltar (2012)
- Janet Smith (1972): First female appointed as a Judge of the Gibraltar Court of Appeal (2017)
- Emma Lejeune: First female Chairperson of the Law Council of Gibraltar (2025)

==== Isle of Man ====
- Clare Faulds (1973): First female admitted to the Manx Bar in the Isle of Man (Crown dependency). In 1996, Faulds was the first female Manx advocate commissioned as a judge. She was later appointed as a Senior Magistrate for the Falkland Islands and South Georgia and the South Sandwich Islands (2004–2008, 2014–2016).
- Sharon Roberts: First female appointed as a permanent Deemster and serve as the president of the Isle of Man Law Society (2007)
- Jayne Hughes: First female Deputy High Bailiff of the Isle of Man (2011). She later became High Bailiff in 2019.

==== Montserrat ====
- Elizabeth Constance Griffin (1969): First female lawyer in Montserrat
- Monica Theresa Joseph: First female appointed as a Justice of the Eastern Caribbean Supreme Court (1982)
- Gertel Thom: First female Attorney General of Montserrat (1993-1998)
- Nicole Sylvester: First female to serve as the president of the Organization of Eastern Caribbean States (OECS) Bar Association (c. 2007)
- Kathy-Ann Pyke: First (female) Director of the Office of Public Prosecutions in Montserrat (2011)
- Janice Pereira (British Virgin Islands, 1981): First female (and British Virgin Islander) justice appointed as the Chief Justice of the Eastern Caribbean Supreme Court (2012)
- Chivone Gerald: First (female) President of the then-revived Montserrat Bar Association (2013)

==== Pitcairn Islands ====
- Jane Lovell-Smith: First female to serve as a Judge of the Supreme Court of the Pitcairn Islands (2004)
- Judith Potter (1965): First female (a New Zealander) appointed as a Judge of the Pitcairn Court of Appeal (2012) (Pitcairn Islands)
- Danielle Kelly: First female to serve as the Attorney General of Pitcairn Islands (2025)

==== Saint Helena, Ascension and Tristan da Cunha ====
- Jane Hamilton-White: First female appointed as the Public Solicitor for Saint Helena, Ascension and Tristan da Cunha (2006)

==== South Georgia and Sandwich Islands ====
- Rosalind Catriona Cheek: First female appointed as the Acting Attorney General (28 March 2011; 21 November 2017) and Acting Coroner (21 November 2017)
- Alison Anne Mackenzie Inglis: First female appointed as the Registrar General (7 February 2012)
- Clare Faulds: First female appointed as the Senior Magistrate and hence also Coroner (on 3 November 2014), also of the Falkland Islands and British Antarctic Territory

==== Turks and Caicos Islands ====
- Ena Collymore-Woodstock: First female magistrate in Turks and Caicos Islands (1976)
- Shirley D. Simmons (1980): First female (a Bermudian) admitted to the Turks and Caicos Islands Bar Association
- Margaret Ramsay-Hale (1991): First female appointed as a Justice of the Supreme Court of the Turks and Caicos Islands (2011) and serve as its Chief Justice (2014)
- Lisa Agard: First female Senior Counsel to work for the Attorney General's Office of the Turks and Caicos Islands (c. 1987)
- Sarah Knight (1998): First Turks and Caicos Islander female admitted to the Turks and Caicos Islands Bar Association. She later served as the association's president.
- Rhondalee Braithwaite-Knowles: First Turks and Caicos Islander female to become a Deputy Attorney General (2008) and Attorney General of Turks and Caicos Islands (2014). She later became the first female Queen's Counsel (QC) in the Turks and Caicos Islands.
- JoAnn Meloche: First (female) Director of Public Prosecutions in the Turks and Caicos Islands (2013)
- Oreika Selver-Gardiner: First local female attorney to serve as a magistrate in the Turks and Caicos Islands (2020)
- Alice Yorke-Soo Hon: First female to serve as the President of the Turks and Caicos Islands Court of Appeal (2024)

== Professional networks ==
- Female Lawyers Breakfast Networking (FLBN) is a professional networking group founded in January 2023 by Tanya Dolan and Maddie Drabble in London, United Kingdom. FLBN events are aimed at the retention of female lawyers within the profession and encouraging cross-industry networking at all career levels. FLBN events take place in London, Manchester, Cambridge, Paris and Dubai and consist of aspiring lawyers, private practice lawyers, in-house lawyers, barristers, male allies and all supporters of diversity and inclusion. FLBN was recognised as one of the finalists in the 2024 Women & Diversity in Law Awards.

== See also ==
- Women in policing in the United Kingdom
- Women in law
- Legal professions in England and Wales
- Northern Ireland law
- Scots law
- List of first women lawyers and judges in Europe
