= Prison Commission =

Prison Commission may refer to:

- Prison Commission (England and Wales) (1877–1963)
- Prison Commission (Scotland) (later "Prison Department", 1877–1939)
- Scottish Prisons Commission (2007–8)
