= Margaret Booth (judge) =

British judge (1933–2021)

Dame Margaret Myfanwy Wood Booth, DBE (11 September 1933 – 1 January 2021) was a British judge.

== Education and career ==
Her father was told by a cousin in the early 1950s, "Don't put your daughter in to law; there is no place for women in the law" but the family ignored this and Margaret Booth was called to the Bar in 1956 after studying law at University College London, having won a scholarship from Middle Temple. In 1976 she took silk, becoming only the tenth woman appointed a Queen's Counsel.

In January 1979, she became the third woman to be appointed as a High Court judge. Like her predecessors, Elizabeth Lane and Rose Heilbron, she was assigned to the Family Division. In 1980, she chaired a committee that unanimously called for no-fault divorce, yet the Divorce, Dissolution and Separation Bill only reached the House of Lords in the days following her death.

She retired from judicial office in 1994.

She was awarded an honorary LLD by the University of Liverpool in 1992, and served as the Vice-President of its Council from 1996 to 1999. She became a fellow of University College, London in 1992. She was president of the National Family and Parenting Institute in which role she was deeply critical of the way in which family courts fell short of the mark, considering Britain to be decades behind other countries.

From 2004 she was President of the Family and Parenting Institute, having been Chairman from 1999 to 2004.

Booth was diagnosed with Parkinson's disease later in life. She died on Wellington House on New Year's Day 2021. Her funeral was held in Golders Green Crematorium on 14 January 2021.

== Personal life ==
Booth married Joe Jackson on 25 August 1982, he died after a car crash in May 1987. She re-married on 9 September 1993 with Peter Gluksman, who died in 2002.
