= Madge Easton Anderson =

First female Scottish lawyer (1896–1982)

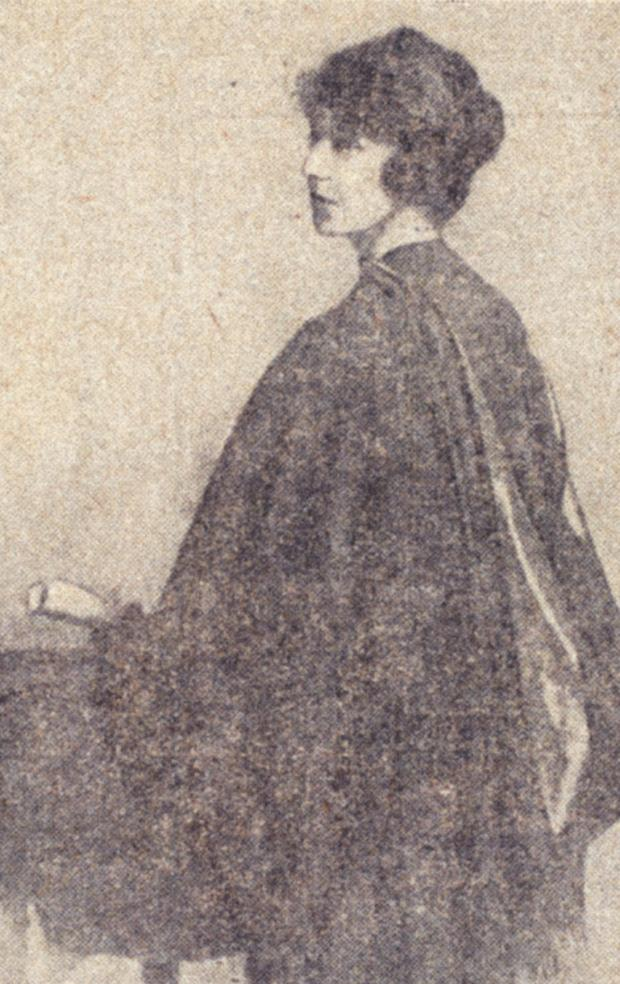
- Born: 24 April 1896; Glasgow, Scotland
- Died: 9 August 1982 (aged 86); Perth, Scotland
- Occupation: lawyer
- Employer(s): Edith Annie Berthen and Beatrice Honour Davy
- Known for: first woman admitted to practise as a professional lawyer in the UK

Madge Easton Anderson (24 April 1896 – 9 August 1982) was a Scottish lawyer. She was the first woman admitted to practise as a professional lawyer in the UK when, in 1920, she qualified as a solicitor in Scotland.

== Early life and education ==
Anderson was born on 24 April 1896 in Glasgow to Anne Catherine Chisholm (1864–1947), daughter of an Inverness bookseller, and Robert Easton Anderson (1865-1932), a surgical instrument maker.

From 1904 to 1913 she attended Hutchesons' Grammar School, going on to study at the University of Glasgow. She graduated with an MA in 1916, a BL in 1919 and an LLB in 1920. She was the first woman to graduate from the University with a degree in law. She was not however the first female law graduate in Scotland: Eveline MacLaren and Josephine Gordon Stuart graduated from the Faculty of Law at the University of Edinburgh some years earlier, but at that time women were prohibited from practising as lawyers.

In October 1931, Anderson matriculated once again in the Faculty of Law, University of Glasgow to research for the degree of Ph.D. in International Law, although there is no record of the Ph.D being awarded.

== Legal career ==
On 12 May 1917, she began working as an apprentice law agent at the practice of Maclay Murray & Spens. In 1920, Anderson was the first woman to be admitted to the legal profession in the United Kingdom following the passing of the Sex Disqualification (Removal) Act 1919. She was admitted as a law agent in Scotland (the Scottish Law Agents Society was formed in 1884; the Law Society of Scotland was not created until 1949).

Her application for admission as a law agent was initially refused, because the necessary three years of training began before the passing of the Act, and her indenture of training was not properly registered — registration was refused in 1917 because she was a woman. She appealed to the Court of Session, and her petition was reported to the Inner House, First Division, and heard in December 1920, by the Lord President, Lord Mackenzie, Lord Skerrington and Lord Cullen. The opinion of the Lord Ordinary Lord Ashmore criticised the English terminology used in the Act, but concluded that she was entitled to have her petition granted, and the court upheld her appeal.

In 1922, Anderson was working at the Glasgow law firm John Steuart and Gillies, where she stayed for five years before establishing her own practice in Giffnock. She was articled in London, with legal partners Edith Annie Berthen and Beatrice Honour Davy. They had established the first legal firm run by women in 1931. In 1937, she became the first woman qualified to practice as a solicitor in both England and Scotland, after passing the English Law Society final exam. She then joined Berthen and Davy as a partner in the expanded law firm Berthen, Davy and Anderson. The firm survived until 1951.

== Later life ==
In 1949, she purchased a house near Dunkeld in Perthshire which she ran as a private hotel for some years, before moving first to a cottage near Crieff and then to Bankfoot, Perth and Kinross. The details of her later life remain obscure. Anderson died at the Royal Infirmary, Perth, on 9 August 1982.

== Cultural recognition ==
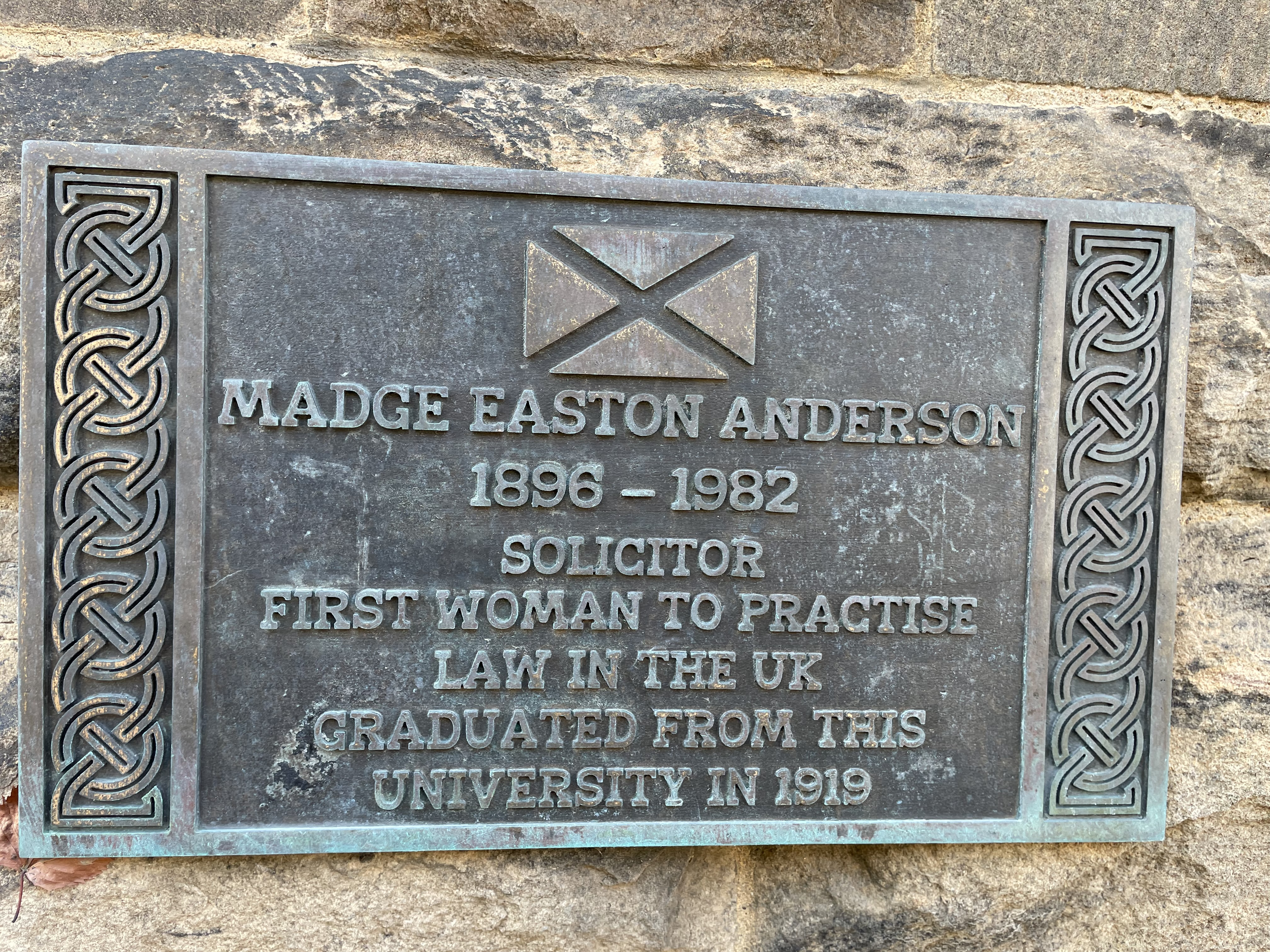
Historic plaque outside Law School at the University of Glasgow

She is honoured with a Historic Environment Scotland plaque at the Stair Building, University of Glasgow’s School of Law.

== See also ==
- Margaret Kidd DBE, KC, the first woman to be called to the Scottish Bar, in July 1923

== Notes ==
- Put her on a pedestal, The Scotsman, 7 March 2004
- Women in the World's Legal Professions, Ulrike Schultz, Gisela Shaw, p. 141
