= Alistair Duff =

Scottish lawyer

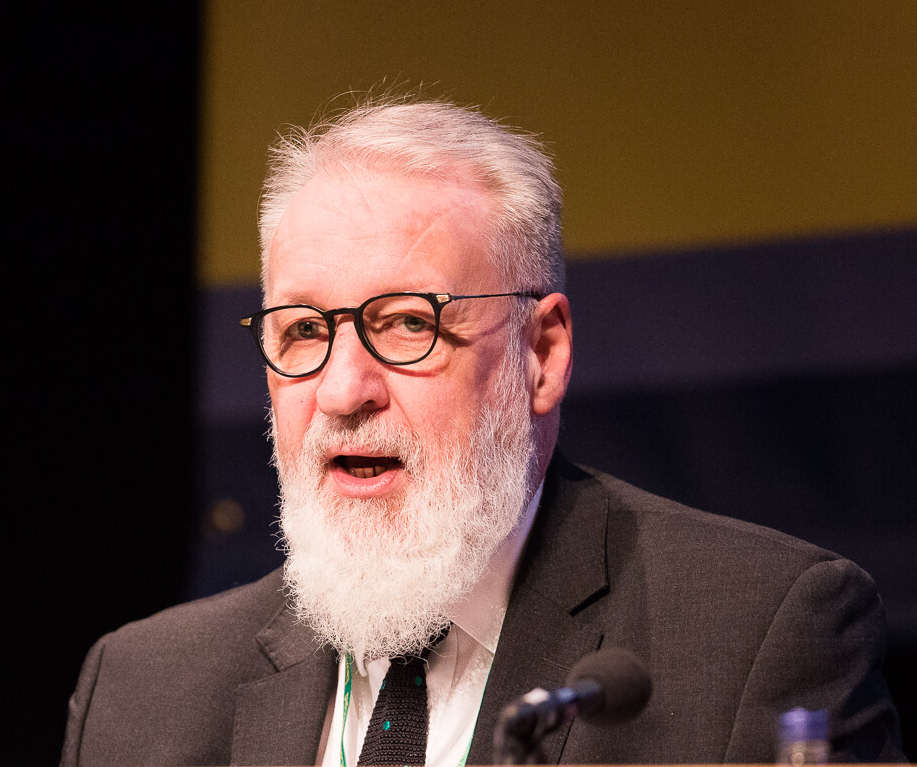
Duff speaking at the Law Society of Scotland Annual Conference in 2019

Alistair John MacKenzie Duff (born 1954) is a former Scottish solicitor and sheriff who qualified as a solicitor-advocate in 1993, and later became Director of the Judicial Institute of Scotland before resigning after being arrested and charged with undisclosed offences.

== Personal life ==
Duff was born in Kirkcaldy, Fife in 1954 and moved to Glenrothes where he attended secondary school at Glenwood High School, Glenrothes then to Glenrothes High School where both his father and uncle were teachers. In 1971 he went to Edinburgh Law School where he graduated with first class honours. He married Carol Ferguson in April 1978 in Edinburgh, with whom he had four children. They divorced in 2007 and in the same year he married his current wife Susan Duff.

Susan Duff was a defence advocate at Compass Chambers in Edinburgh, subsequently appointed a Sheriff in October 2021 for Tayside, Central and Fife regions.

== Legal career ==
- Alistair Duff was admitted as a solicitor in 1977 and worked as a procurator fiscal between 1977 and 1981
- He was in private practice as a solicitor specialising in criminal defence between 1981 and 2004
- He qualified as a solicitor-advocate with criminal rights of audience in 1993 and conducted cases before the High Court of Justiciary
- He was engaged to advise the two Libyan nationals accused in the Lockerbie case in 1993 and subsequently represented Abdelbaset al-Megrahi at the Pan Am Flight 103 bombing trial in the Netherlands between 1999 and 2002. An Al-Jazeera documentary shows court video of Duff in consultation with al-Megrahi at Camp Zeist.
- He was appointed Resident Sheriff in the Sheriff Court of Dundee in 2004
- In 2007 he was appointed to the Scottish Prisons Commission alongside Henry McLeish, Lesley Riddoch, Dr Karin Dotter-Schiller, Geraldine Gammell, Richard Jeffrey and Chief Constable David Strang
- He became involved in judicial training in 2011 and was appointed Director of the Judicial Institute for Scotland in 2014. The Institute provides education and training for Scottish judges in all aspects of Scots Law. In his role of Director he attended many high level conferences concerning judicial reform in Scotland and Europe.
- In 2016 he gave a presentation to National Youth Justice Conference organised by the Children and Young Peoples Centre for Justice
- In 2019 he was appointed to a tribunal alongside Lord Bracadale and others to look into the case of Aberdeen Sheriff Jack Brown concerning alleged sexual misconduct. The tribunal's findings were later overturned.
- He has formerly been a member of the following bodies: -
  - Law Society of Scotland Council
  - Scottish Sentencing Council
  - McInnes Committee on Summary Justice Reform

In December 2021 he abruptly retired from the Judicial Institute for Scotland following his arrest in October 2021.

== Arrest ==
He was arrested and charged in December 2021 following a complaint made in October 2021 and appeared in court on 6 November 2023, charged with 'sexually aggravated breach of the peace'. The offence consisted of being overheard, whilst watching a video, making sexual and a racial remark to another man during the break in an online training session for justices of the peace, two of whom reported him to the police. He was fined £1275 .

Concerns about the apparent secrecy surrounding the case were expressed in various quarters, including Member of Scottish Parliament Russell Findlay who submitted two written questions to the Scottish Parliament asking for the publication of ministerial correspondence relating to Duff's arrest and resignation and legal advice received in ruling against the MSP, all of which were rejected. Some information, excluding court records and personal information, was released on 9 November 2022.

On 22 November 2022, following further police investigations, Duff was arrested and charged with a further offence. Further information following a freedom of information request was withheld by Police Scotland in May 2024 on the basis that investigations were on-going.
