= Olga Karlatos =

Greek actress (born 1945)

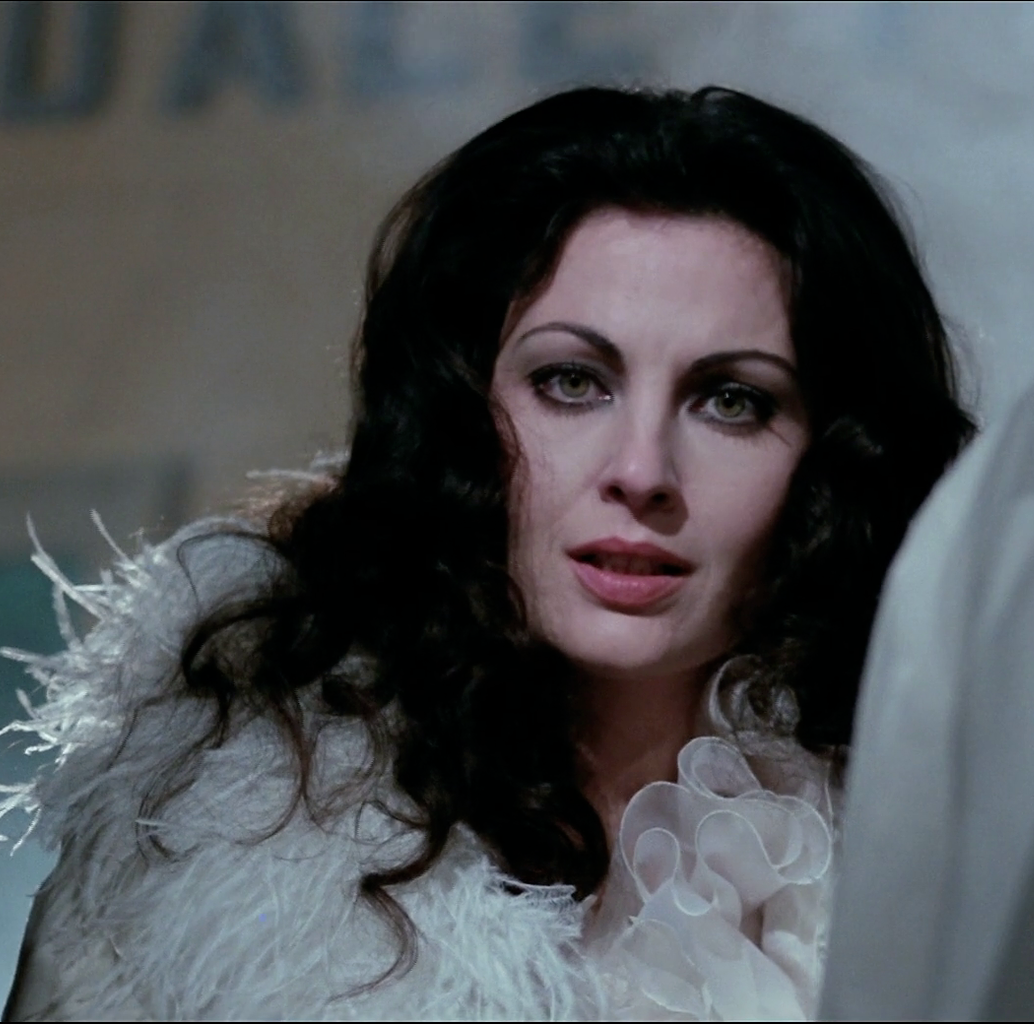
- Karlatos in My Friends (1975)
- Born: 20 April 1945 (age 81); Athens, Kingdom of Greece
- Education: University of Kent
- Occupations: Actress; lawyer
- Years active: 1966–1986
- Spouses: Nikos Papatakis (m. 1967; div. 1982) Arthur Rankin (m. 1983; died 2014)
- Children: 1

Olga Karlatos (Greek: Όλγα Καρλάτου; 20 April 1945) is a Greek lawyer and former actress, known primarily for performing in Italian horror cinema. After retiring from acting, she studied law and became a lawyer in Bermuda.

== Career ==
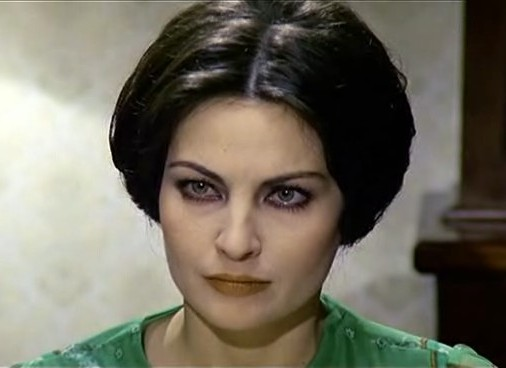
Karlatos in Amici miei (1975)

Between the end of the 1960s and the early 70s, Karlatos had a short career as a singer, recording an EP and some singles in French and Italian, including the theme song of the drama Eneide, in which she starred as Dido, the legendary queen of Carthage. In 1975, she took part in the film My Friends, directed by Mario Monicelli, in which she played Donatella, the unhappy wife of the surgeon Alfeo Sassaroli.

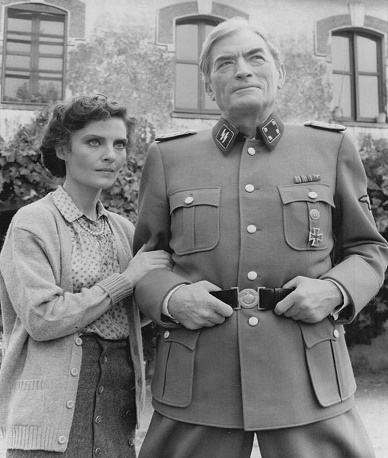
Olga Karlatos and Gregory Peck in the TV movie The Scarlet and the Black (1983)

During the 1980s, she participated in the film of Mauro Bolognini The Lady of the Camellias (1981), with Isabelle Huppert; she later played the starring role in the Lucio Fulci giallo film Murder Rock (1984), a small part in the Sergio Leone film Once Upon A Time In America (1984), and the film musical Purple Rain (1984) with Prince, in which she played the singer's mother.

She also appeared in such television productions as Peter and Paul (1981), The Scarlet and the Black (1983), Quo Vadis? (1985), and Miami Vice (1986).

=== Post-acting career ===
In 2007, Karlatos graduated from the University of Kent with a law degree and was admitted to the Bermuda Bar Association in 2010.

== Personal life ==
Karlatos married Greek-Ethiopian filmmaker Nikos Papatakis in 1967. The couple had one child together, son Serge (b. 1967), before their divorce in 1982. The next year, she married American director, producer, and writer Arthur Rankin after he cast her in a television adaption of The Picture of Dorian Gray, The Sins of Dorian Gray. They later settled in Bermuda.

== Selected filmography ==
=== Film ===
Year	Title	Role	Notes
1975	My Friends	Donatella Sassaroli	
1976	Keoma	Liza Farrow	
1976	Gloria Mundi	Galai	
1977	Wifemistress	Dr. Paola Pagano	
1978	Blood and Diamonds	Maria	
1978	Damned in Venice	Madeleine Winters	
1978	Cyclone	Monica	
1978	Convoy Busters	Anna	
1978	The Idlers of the Fertile Valley	Sofia	
1979	A Dangerous Toy	Laura Griffo	
1979	Zombi 2	Paola Menard	
1979	Velvet Hands	Petula Quiller	
1979	The Finzi Detective Agency	Clara Moser	
1980	Eleftherios Venizelos 1910-1927	Queen Sophia	
1980	Exodos Kindynou - Emergency Exit	Daisy Alexiou	
1984	Once Upon A Time In America	Wayang Patron	
1984	Murder Rock	Candice Norman	
1984	Purple Rain	Mother	

=== Television ===
Year	Title	Role	Notes
1971-72	Eneide	Dido	TV serial
1978	Return of the Saint	Vlora	TV Series. S1 E1. The Judas Game
1978	Der Schatz des Priamos	Sophia Schliemann	TV movie
1981	Peter and Paul	Berenice	Miniseries
1983	The Scarlet and the Black	Francesca Lombardo	TV movie
1985	Quo Vadis?	Epicaris	Miniseries
1986	Miami Vice	Felicia Diaz	Episode: "Forgive Us Our Debts"
