= Monica Geike Cobb =

English barrister (1891–1946)

Monica Geike Cobb (1891–1946) was a barrister and the first English woman to hold a brief in court, which she won.

== Early life and wartime service ==
She was born 8 March 1891 to Revd William Cobb (later Geike Cobb), a suffragist rector who spoke at Emmeline Pankhurst’s funeral, and his wife Harriette, née White.

While studying for a BA in philosophy at the University College London in 1914, she became joint secretary to the Professional Classes War Relief Council providing practical assistance to the professional classes, for which work she was appointed MBE in March 1920.

== Legal career ==
When the legal profession was opened to women in England by the Sex Disqualification (Removal) Act (1919), Cobb joined the Middle Temple on 2 January 1920, eleven days after the Act came into force and ten days after Helena Normanton became the first woman to do so. She returned to University College to study for an LLB. She excelled in her first year, obtaining a First Class in Real Property and Conveyancing and winning the Hume Scholarship, and passed the bar examination in October 1921.

On 17 November 1922 Cobb was one of a cohort of eight women called to the bar at the Middle Temple, along with Normanton, Ethel Bright Ashford, and Beatrice Davy.

On 1 December 1922, she became the first Englishwoman to plead a case in court when she successfully convicted a Birmingham bricklayer of bigamy.

The next year, she was thought to be the first English woman to appear in a murder trial.

Her early career comprised criminal cases, but she later had a successful practice in commercial law. She registered for a PhD in 1925, but instead decided to remain in her profession after being appointed deputy chairman of London’s Court of Referees, where she heard cases under the Unemployment Insurance Act.

She publicly recounted the difficulty of witnesses in deciding how to address her, an anecdote that was picked up by global newspapers:

Miss Monica Cobb, one of the foremost of English women barristers, said that she was sometimes addressed as 'madam,' but more often she was addressed as 'sir' and she had even been called 'my lady.' One kind, motherly old lady, she added, had solved the difficulty by calling Miss Cobb 'my dear'.

== Death ==
She died in Hastings, Sussex, on 25 November 1946.

== See also ==
- Timeline of women lawyers
