= Johnny Hamlet =

1968 film by Enzo G. Castellari

- Directed by: Enzo G. Castellari
- Screenplay by: Tito Carpi; Francesco Scardamaglia; Enzo G. Castellari
- Story by: Sergio Corbucci
- Starring: Andrea Giordana; Gilbert Roland; Françoise Prévost; Horst Frank
- Cinematography: Angelo Filippini
- Edited by: Tatiana Casini
- Music by: Francesco De Masi
- Production companies: Daiano Film; Leone Film
- Distributed by: Interfilm
- Release date: 1968
- Country: Italy

Johnny Hamlet (Italian: Quella sporca storia nel West, lit. 'That Dirty Story in the West') is a 1968 Italian film directed by Enzo G. Castellari. The film is a Spaghetti Western version of William Shakespeare's tragedy Hamlet.

== Plot ==
Johnny Hamilton returns to his Texas home from the American Civil War where he fought for the Confederacy. He camps with a theater troupe who is rehearsing Hamlet. When they are attacked by gunfighters, Johnny defends the artists and leaves immediately.

Arriving to his Ranch El Señor, where he finds that his father was killed by the Mexican bandit Santana and his mother Gertry has married his uncle Claude. He is distressed by this disrespect. His friend Horace consoles him and gives him a silver decoration found at the killing site. He goes to a cave cemetery where he makes the grave digger to open the grave of Santana. The skeleton wears a belt with silver decorations like the one found by Horace.

Johnny reconnects with Emily. He suspects that lost Confederate gold is related to the killing. The theater troupe arrive to town and Johnny sleeps with an actress.

Emily is killed by Claude. Her body and Johnny's father's revolver are found in the river by her father, the sheriff. The actress is also killed by Claude.

Johnny searches for Santana and finds him and Claude hidden. They had hidden the Confederate gold. They capture Johnny, who instills doubt in Santana about trusting Claude.

Johnny is found by the sheriff who puts him on a decussate cross. He is freed by Horace.

Santana and his men attack the ranch. Gertry confronts Claude and is shot by one of Claude's henchmen. After fighting the bandits, Claude checks his gold. Johnny fights him and kill him.

As Johnny recovers, the Confederate gold is blown away by the wind. Horace arrives and both friends ride away.

== Cast ==
- Andrea Giordana as Johnny Hamilton (corresponding to Hamlet)
- Gilbert Roland as Horace (corresponding to Horatio)
- Horst Frank as Claude Hamilton (corresponding to King Claudius)
- Françoise Prévost as Gertry Hamilton (corresponding to Gertrude)
- Gabriella Boccardo as Emily (corresponding to Ophelia)
- Stefania Careddu as Eugenia
- Enio Girolami as Ross (corresponding to Rosencrantz)
- Ignazio Spalla as Guild (corresponding to Guildenstern)
- Manuel Serrano as Santana (corresponding to Fortinbras)
- Franco Latini as The Gravedigger (corresponding to the Gravediggers)
- Giorgio Sammartino (as Giorgio Sanmartin) as Sheriff (corresponding to Polonius)
- John Bartha as Acting Troupe Leader

== Production ==
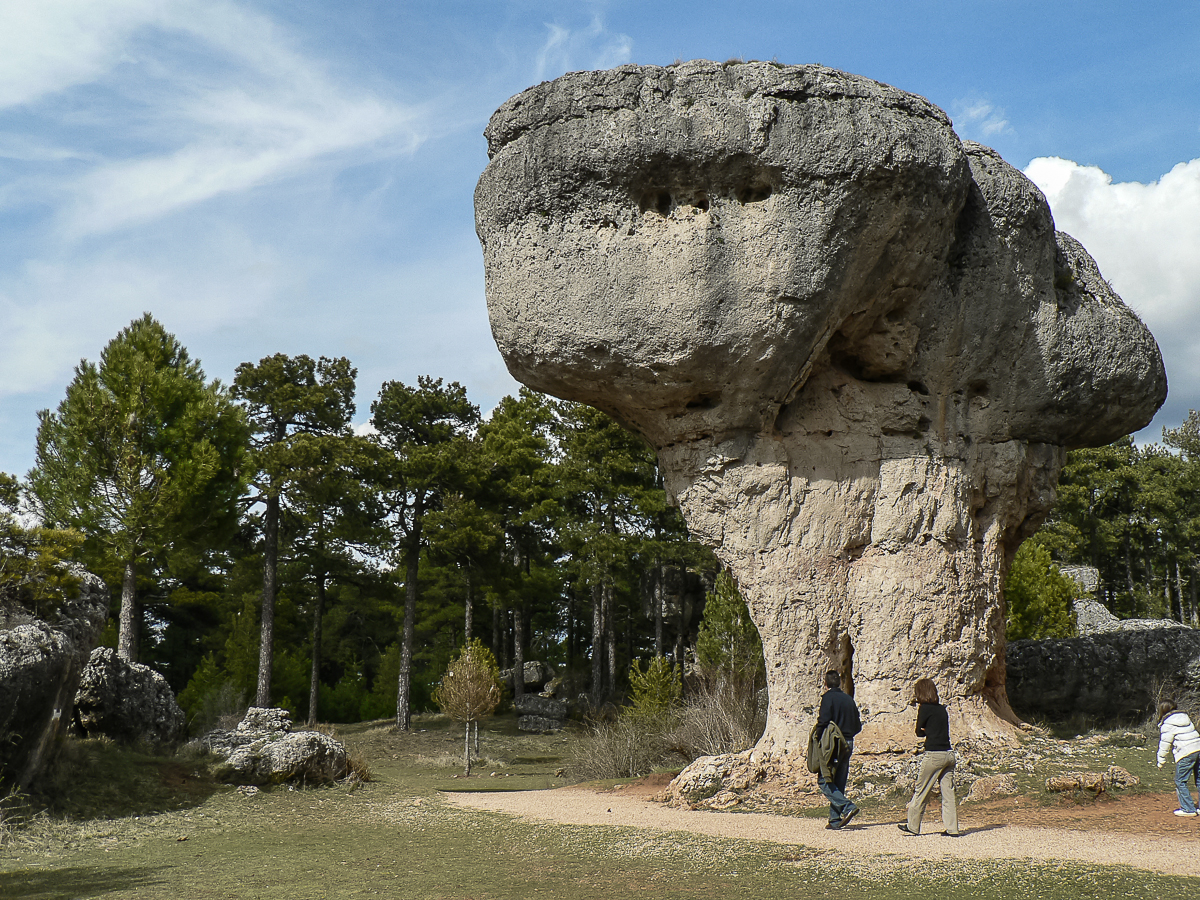
Johnny is filmed riding several times about the capricious rocks of Ciudad Encantada, near Cuenca, Spain.

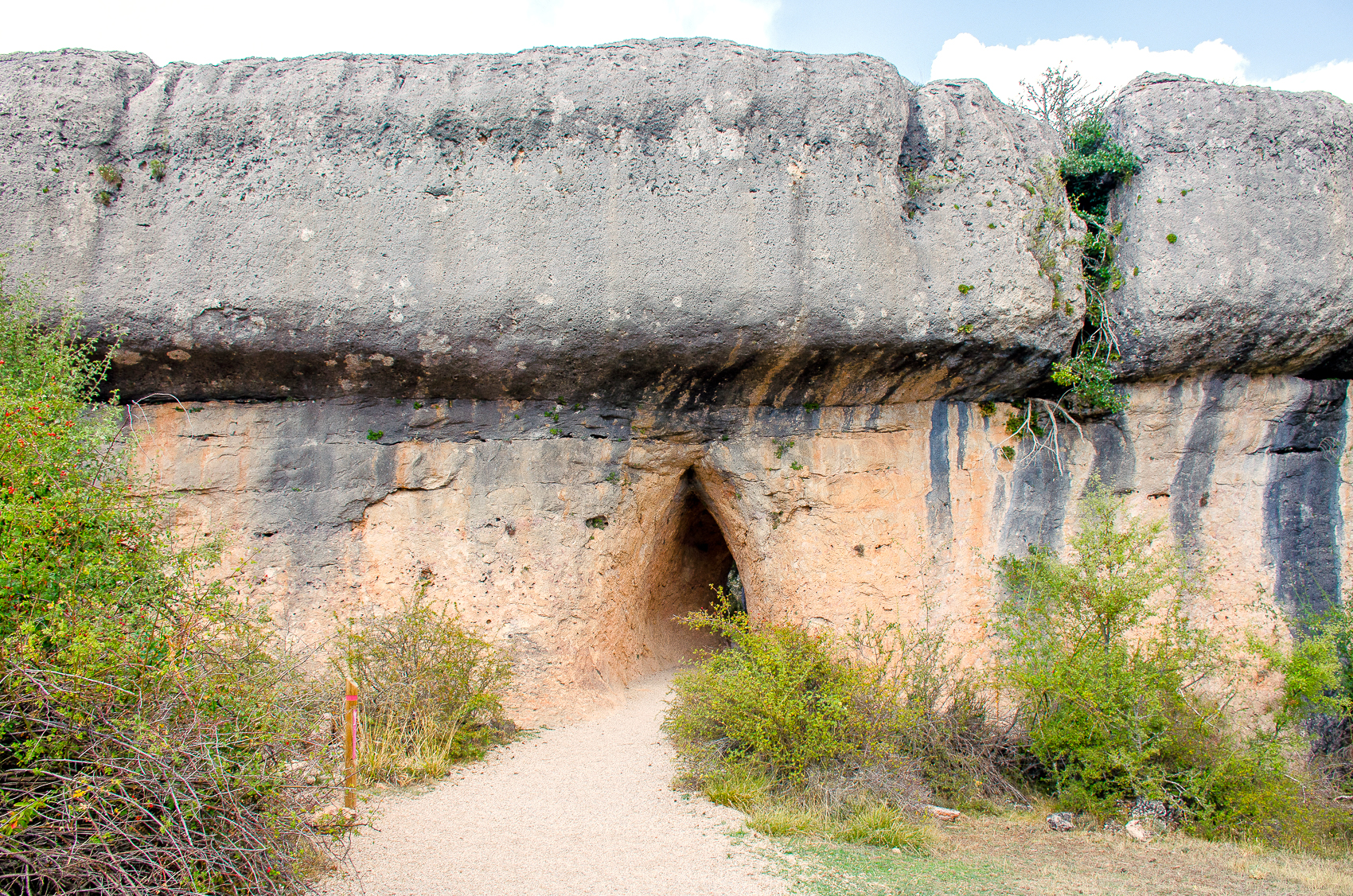
The El Convento formation at Ciudad Encantada was the location of the entrance to the cemetery cave.

According to director Franco Rossetti, after finishing filming The Dirty Outlaws he was offered to do another Western which was a reinterpretation of Hamlet by Sergio Corbucci. Rossetti stated that after he turned down the offer to direct it feeling that he thought Shakespeare in a Western setting was absurd. Rossetti stated that Corbucci was to direct the film after, which the film's eventual director, Enzo G. Castellari stated he was not sure if that was the situation.

Castellari said he was contacted by the producers to direct the film and accepted after liking Corbucci's script. Castellari however later disliked the films Italian title which translated to "The Dirty Story in the West" stating that "Nobody went to see it. If they'd kept Johnny Hamlet, the response of the public would have been different."

== Release ==
Johnny Hamlet was first distributed in 1968. It was distributed by Interfilm in Italy.
