= Michael Hay =

British-French lawyer

Michael Hay was a British-French lawyer who was best known for his legal work within North Korea, where he opened the first, and to date only, foreign law firm in North Korea. Hay was voted one of Asia's Leading Lawyers three years consecutively by the readers of Asialaw Magazine, in 1999, 2000 and 2001.

== Early life ==
Hay was born in Stirling, the child of a Scottish father and a French mother. He completed an LL.B. with Honours and Ph.D. in comparative law from the Edinburgh Law School, and an LL.M. with a concentration in antitrust law from the Northwestern University Pritzker School of Law in Chicago.

Due to his ancestry, Hay was a dual British-French citizen. Hay was multilingual, speaking English, French and Korean.

== Career ==
Hay first worked as a member of the New York Bar in private legal practice in New York City. He came to South Korea in 1990, joining leading Seoul firm Bae, Kim and Lee with a specialization in arbitration. Across 14 years of work, he specialised in international business transactions, international dispute resolution and, since 1997, North Korean law and business practice.

Hay made his first trip to North Korea in 1998, as part of a delegation of the European Chamber of Commerce as the country emerged from its notorious famine and near-economic collapse. Seeing opportunities to conduct business in the country, shortly after the 2000 inter-Korean summit, Hay founded a consulting practice in Pyongyang in 2001. In 2004, Hay founded Hay, Kalb & Associates, the first ever, and to date only, foreign-invested law firm and multidisciplinary business consulting practice in North Korea. The firm operated out of a Pyongyang hotel, with Hay the only foreigner working for the firm; “Kalb” stood for “Korea Advisors on Law and Business”, while “associates” referred to the assigned government lawyers from the Ministry of Foreign Trade. Hay, Kalb & Associates specialised in the areas of regulatory compliance, foreign investment and dispute resolution, and specialised in providing advice to foreign entities with business interests in North Korea, specifically foreign businesses (predominantly from Europe and Southeast Asia) that attempted commerce with North Korea, as well as embassies and aid organisations based in Pyongyang. Hay had initially planned to work with one of the world's top 20 law firms, but when it backed out for fear of sanctions, Hay decided to open his own firm.

During his time in North Korea, Hay specialised in arbitration, handling some 50 cases in Pyongyang while working alongside 12 North Korean colleagues. Hay was well known among businesses and NGOs as one of the few lawyers to have ever successfully won commercial disputes in North Korea's opaque legal system. Hay noted that North Korea had an advanced arbitration system even compared to developed countries, and foreign companies faced an even playing field in dispute resolution. Arbitration cases could be concluded in as little as six months. According to Hay, North Korea maintains an advanced dispute resolution system in order to facilitate foreign investment.

Hay, Kalb & Associates suspended operations in August 2016 due to the effects of foreign sanctions against North Korea affecting the firm's business and clients; the majority of the firm's clients were foreign investors who had struggled with sanctions placed on North Korea, with the sanctions rendering the firm and its business unviable to continue. At the time of its suspension of operations, the firm had accrued thousands of hours experience negotiating between DPRK entities and foreign clients.

After spending 12 years working in North Korea, and after a short break, Hay returned to working in South Korea in late 2018, joining Hwang Mok Pak, a law firm in Seoul, as their in-house North Korea expert. He left the firm in November 2019.

== Death ==
Hay died in Seoul in February 2020 at the age of 58. Unmarried and without children, he is survived by six siblings.
