= A Taste of Death =

1968 film

- Directed by: Sergio Merolle
- Written by: Biagio Proietti
- Produced by: Enzo Merolle; Robert Dorfmann
- Starring: Andrea Giordana; John Ireland; Raymond Pellegrin
- Cinematography: Benito Frattari
- Edited by: Antonietta Zita
- Music by: Francesco De Masi
- Release date: 1968
- Country: Italy

A Taste of Death (Italian: Quanto costa morire, French: Les colts brillent au soleil, also known as Cost of Dying) is a 1968 Italian-French Spaghetti Western film directed by Sergio Merolle and starring Andrea Giordana, John Ireland and Raymond Pellegrin.

== Cast ==
- Andrea Giordana as Tony
- John Ireland as Dan El
- Raymond Pellegrin as Bill Ransom
- Betsy Bell as Gladys
- Bruno Corazzari as Scaife
- Mireille Granelli as Scaife's girlfriend

== Production ==
The film was co-produced by Italian Cine Azimut and French Les Films Corona. It was mainly shot in the Abruzzo, Lazio and Molise National Park. It was the only directorial effort by Sergio Merolle, who was mainly active as production manager in art films.

== Reception ==
Several critics noted the political subtext of the film, whose plot is a metaphor of the Italian resistance movement in the World War II.
