= Andrea Giordana =

Italian actor (born 1946)

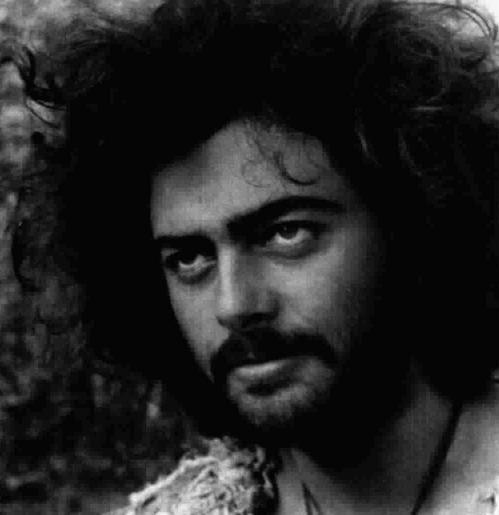
- Andrea Giordana in Eneide (1971)
- Born: 27 March 1946 (age 80); Rome, Italy
- Other names: Burt Nelson, Chip Corman
- Occupations: actor, singer
- Years active: 1957–present
- Height: 1.86 m (6 ft 1 in)

Andrea Giordana (born 27 March 1946) is an Italian actor. He has appeared in more than 14 films, 29 television and 35 theater shows since the mostly late 1950s.

== Early life ==
He was born in Rome, Italy to film director Claudio Gora and actress Marina Berti. His siblings are Marina, Luca, Carlo and Cristina. He began acting as a child, appearing in 1957 film Erode il grande (Herod the Great) at the age of 11 as small Daniel.

== Career ==
He made his television debut The Count of Monte Christo (il conte di Montecristo) playing Edmond Dantes in 1966. He starred in the 1971 miniseries Eneide as Turnus and Quaranta giorni di libertà (Forty Days of Freedom), directed by Leandro Castellani. In 1976 he played Colonel Sir William Fitzgerald in the German-Italian television series Sandokan. Giordana appeared in the 1967 film È stato bello amarti directed by Adimaro Sala.

He made several recordings, including the 1966 album Dies Irae with band I Samurai. In 1969 he made the 45 "Ecstasy". He performed with actress Marisa Solinas and in 1971 Ti prego...non-scherzare con me! (Please do mess with me).

From 1966 to 1973 he starred in several soap operas for the magazine Sogno. Among his partners were Patty Pravo, Laura Efrikian, Lorella De Luca, Susanna Martinková and Rosalba Grottesi. In 1983 he introduced the Sanremo Music Festival and was supported by Isabel Russinova. He co-presented with Hong Kong-born French singer Amanda Lear in W le donne, a variety of Rete 4 aired during 1984–1985.

On 20 July 1995 he co-presented with Myriam Fecchi on the television show Tribute to Mia Martini, organized by artistic director Ruggero Pegna, broadcast by Rai 2.

In 2007 he co-starred in the Rai 1 television series War and Peace as Count Rostov and directed by Robert Dornhelm. His pseudonym was Chip Corman or Burt Nelson.

== Selected filmography ==
- The Italian in Love (Le Italiani e l'amore) (1961)
- Grand Canyon Massacre (1964)
- The Count of Monte Christo (1966)
- The Dirty Outlaws (1967)
- Johnny Hamlet (1968)
- A Taste of Death (1968)
- Eneide (1971)
- Sandokan (1976)
- Beyond Fear (1995)
- War and Peace (2007)
- Mary of Nazareth (2012)
