= Kenneth Reid (legal scholar) =

Kenneth Gilbert Cameron Reid CBE, FBA, FRSE, WS, (born 25 March 1954) is a legal scholar and former law commissioner who holds the Chair of Scots Law at the University of Edinburgh School of Law.

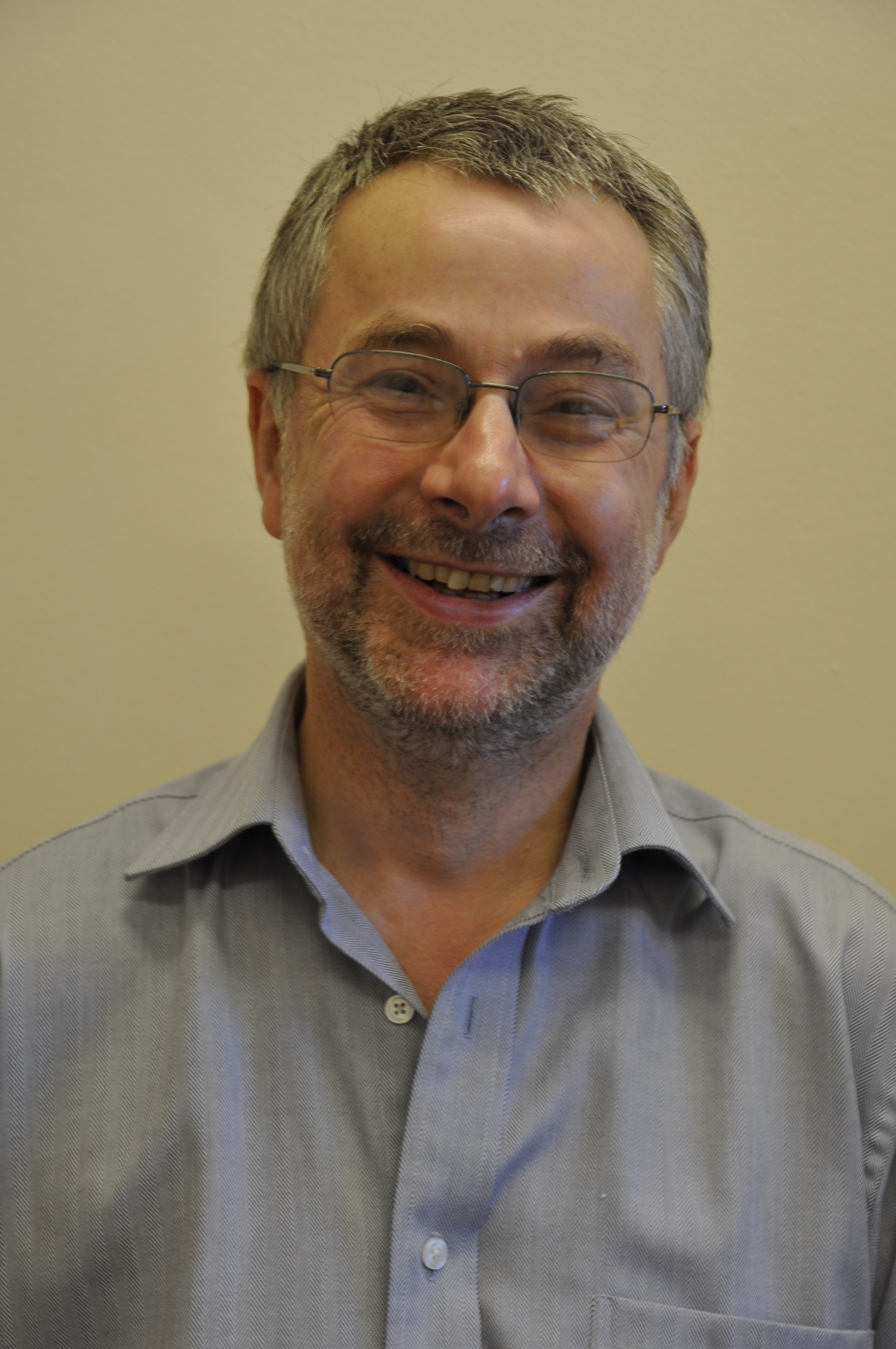

== Career ==
Kenneth Reid was educated at the independent Loretto School and St John's College, Cambridge, where he studied history, then later at the University of Edinburgh where he studied law. It is here where he first met George Gretton, with whom he would collaborate with extensively during his academic career. After working as a solicitor, he became a lecturer in law at the University of Edinburgh in 1980 where he was subsequently appointed to the Chair of Property Law in 1994 and then the Chair of Scots Law in 2008.

Reid's seminal work is his The Law of Property in Scotland published in The Stair Memorial Encyclopaedia volume 18 in 1993 and as a book in 1996. He has published widely on property law, as well as on trusts and succession. He has edited several books with Reinhard Zimmermann, including a volume on the history of Scottish private law, a volume comparing Scottish and South African private law and several volumes on aspects of comparative succession law.

In 1995, he was appointed to the Scottish Law Commission as Commissioner to direct major reforms in property law. He served as a Commissioner until 2005 and was responsible for the reports which resulted in the Abolition of Feudal Tenure etc. (Scotland) Act 2000, the Title Conditions (Scotland) Act 2003 and the Tenements (Scotland) Act 2004. In addition he authored the discussion papers which led ultimately to the Land Registration etc. (Scotland) Act 2012. He was appointed CBE for his law reform work. In 2015 he was awarded an Honorary Doctorate from the University of Cape Town.

== Bibliography ==
- Kenneth Reid The Law of Property in Scotland (2nd edn) (Butterworths/Law Society of Scotland, 2026)
- Kenneth Reid, George L Gretton Conveyancing 2016 and all editions since 1999 (Avizandum Publishing Ltd, 2017)
- George L Gretton, Kenneth Reid Conveyancing (4th edn) (W Green, 2011)
- Kenneth Reid and Reinhard Zimmermann (eds) "A History of Private Law in Scotland" (2000)
