= Eneide (1971 serial) =

1971 Italian television serial

- Genre: Adventure, mythology
- Based on: Aeneid by Virgil
- Screenplay by: Arnaldo Bagnasco; Vittorio Bonicelli; P. M. Pasinetti; Mario Prosperi; Franco Rossi
- Directed by: Franco Rossi
- Starring: Giulio Brogi; Olga Karlatos
- Theme music composer: Mario Nascimbene
- Countries of origin: Italy; West Germany; France; Yugoslavia
- Original language: Italian
- No. of episodes: 7

Production
- Cinematography: Vittorio Storaro
- Editor: Giorgio Serrallonga
- Running time: 311 minutes 100 minutes (theatrical)

Original release
- Network: Programma Nazionale
- Release: 19 December 1971 – 30 January 1972

Eneide is a seven-episode 1971–1972 Italian television drama, adapted by Franco Rossi from Virgil's epic poem the Aeneid. It stars Giulio Brogi as Aeneas and Olga Karlatos as Dido, and also stars Alessandro Haber, Andrea Giordana and Marilù Tolo. RAI originally broadcast the hour-long episodes from 19 December 1971 to 30 January 1972. A shorter theatrical version was released in 1974 as Le avventure di Enea.

== Plot ==
Episode 1: The city of Troy is in ruins after the Trojan War. One of the survivors is the demigod Aeneas, who escaped with a Trojan fleet. He arrives at Carthage in North Africa, where the queen Dido asks him to tell his story. He begins by telling her about the Trojan Horse.

Episode 2: Aeneas tells Dido how he travelled on the Mediterranean Sea and visited Delos, where an oracle told him to find the "ancient mother". He decided to travel west.

Episode 3: After having heard Aeneas' story, Dido dismisses him. She is however fascinated by his search for the earth mother and cannot sleep. She tells him to go and find her in the land Hesperia, located in the north.

Episode 4: Aeneas finds a community of Trojan survivors on an island. Juno instigates the Trojan women to set fire to the fleet, but it is saved by rainfall.

Episode 5: Aeneas' mother Venus guides him to the underworld to receive strength from his father's shadow. The Trojans arrive at the Tiber in Latium, where a prophecy says that Lavinia, the daughter of the king Latinus, will marry a foreigner. Aeneas develops a bond with Turnus, king of the Rutuli.

Episode 6: After advice from Latinus, Aeneas visits the inland, where an old Greek man tells him legends. Intrigues involving Lavinia and Turnus stir up conflict between the Trojans and the Latins.

Episode 7: To solve the conflict, Aeneas challenges Turnus in single combat to the death. He wins and marries Lavinia. On his deathbed, Latinus bequeaths his land to Aeneas.

== Cast ==
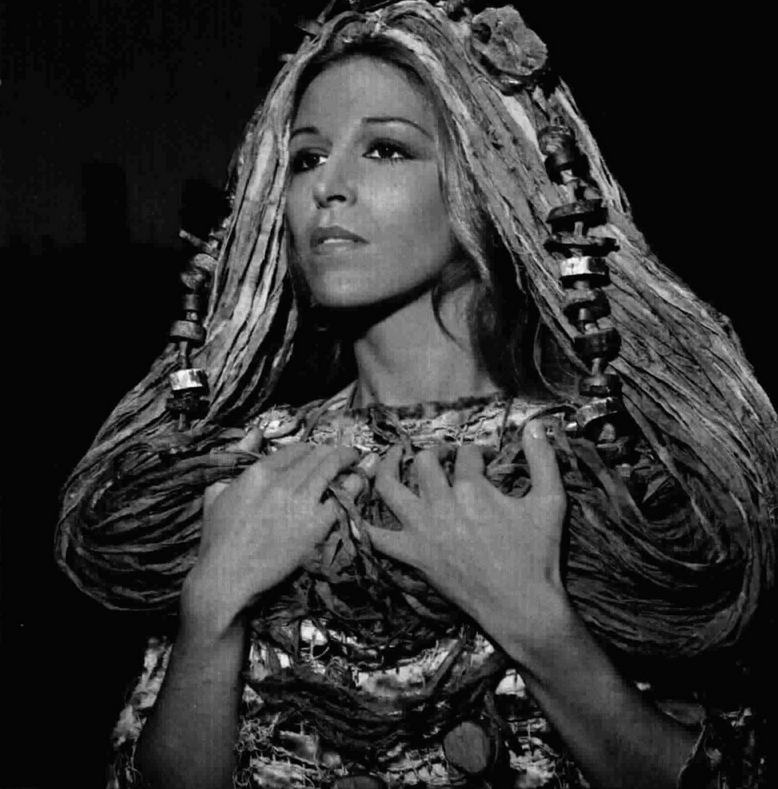
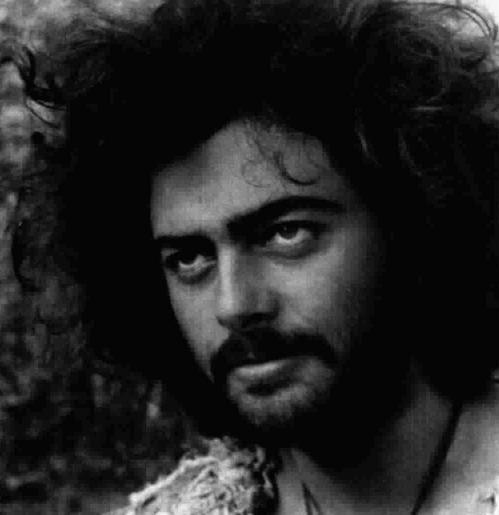
Anna Maria Gherardi as Amata and Andrea Giordana as Turnus
- Giulio Brogi as Aeneas
- Olga Karlatos as Dido
- Andrea Giordana as Turnus
- Marilù Tolo as Venus
- Vasa Pantelic as Anchises
- Arsen Costa as Ascanius
- Marisa Bartoli as Andromache
- Angelica Zielke as Creusa
- Ilaria Guerrini as Juno
- Alessandro Haber as Misenus
- Christian Ledoux as Palinurus
- Jaspar Von Oertzen as Evander
- Jagoda Ristic as Lavinia
- Anna Maria Gherardi as Amata
- Janez Vrhovec as Latinus

== Production ==
Franco Rossi's 1968 television adaptation of Homer's Odyssey had been a success in Italy and elsewhere in Europe, and was followed by an adaptation of the ancient Roman author Virgil's epic poem the Aeneid. Like in Rossi's Odyssey, Roberto Rossellini's television works and Pier Paolo Pasolini's films such as Oedipus Rex (1967) and Medea (1969) provided inspiration for the use of natural locations and sometimes intentionally anachronistic set and costume designs. The exterior scenes set in Carthage were filmed in the Bamyan valley in Afghanistan, where one of the giant Buddha statues was used to represent an unnamed pre-Tyrian god.

== Reception ==
Eneide premiered on the Italian public television network RAI's channel Programma Nazionale, where it aired from 19 December 1971 to 30 January 1972. Like Rossi's Odyssey before and his Quo Vadis? in 1985, it was well received and distributed internationally. In 1974, a theatrical version edited down to 100 minutes was released in Italian cinemas as Le avventure di Enea (lit. 'The adventures of Aeneas').

== See also ==
- The Odyssey (1968 miniseries)
