= Prison Commission (England and Wales) =

Public body responsible for overseeing prisons in the United Kingdom

The Prison Commission was a public body of the Government of the United Kingdom established in 1877 and responsible for overseeing the operation of HM Prison Service. It was merged into the Home Office on 1 April 1963 to become the Prisons Department.

== History ==
The Prison Commission was established under the Prison Act 1877 as a statutory board to administer and inspect prisons in England and Wales in accordance with the general or special directions of the Secretary of State (the Home Secretary). It took over the executive powers and the property rights of the Home Secretary, but considerable powers remained with the Home Office, including the appointment of a chairman from among the commissioners, of HM Prison Inspectorate and of the senior officers of each prison, the approval of appointments of staff made by the commissioners and the regulation of visiting committees of justices. The commissioners were appointed by royal warrant on the recommendation of the Home Secretary and were salaried.

The commission was a body corporate of not more than five members and was empowered to hold property for the purposes of the Act. Its duties included the maintenance of all prisons, the appointment of subordinate prison staff, the inspection of prison buildings and the condition of prisoners, and the exercise of powers formerly vested in visiting justices and inspectors of prisons. It also submitted annual reports on every prison to the Home Office for presentation to Parliament, together with other returns. The reports included details of manufacturing processes carried on by prisoners within the prisons. The commissioners were assisted in their work by a central staff, by the Prison Inspectorate and by visiting committees of justices, which acted under regulations drawn up by the Home Office.

In 1881 the staffs of the directors of convict prisons and of the Prison Commission were merged, and under the Prisons Act 1898 the office of commissioner was made to carry that of director also. The commission thus became responsible for all prisons in England and Wales. It was closely associated with the Criminal Department of the Home Office and was frequently referred to as the Prison Department of the Home Office. The commission later took charge of borstal institutions (1908) and remand centres and detention centres (1948), and from 1877 to 1895 was responsible for maintaining the register of habitual criminals; in the latter year this was returned to the Metropolitan Police Office. The commission developed secretariat, establishment and finance branches, as well as an Industries and Stores Division concerned with industries in the prisons and borstals and a Works Division dealing with buildings.

== Abolition and merger ==
The directors of convict prisons were abolished in 1948, and on 1 April 1963 the Prison Commission was transferred to the Home Office as its new Prison Department. The merger was made by Order in Council, the Prison Commissioners Dissolution Order 1963 (SI 1963/597), under powers granted by section 24 of the Criminal Justice Act 1961. The merger was relatively contentious, and the order was only passed after over three hours of debate in the House of Commons, and two and a half hours in the House of Lords. The former commissioners remained members of a Prisons Board. The Industries and Stores Division became a distinct section of the new department, but the common service divisions of the commission were merged with the appropriate divisions of the Home Office.

== See also ==
- Prison Commission (Scotland), the sister body to the Commission in England & Wales
- Scottish Prisons Commission, a review body established in 2007 to report on the prison service in Scotland
- This article uses text from The National Archives - Catalogue: Department code PCOM and The National Archives - Catalogue: Series reference PCOM 9, which are licensed under the Open Government Licence v1.0 which permits reuse under the Creative Commons Attribution-ShareAlike 3.0 Unported License, but not under the GFDL.
