= Anna Maria Gherardi =

Italian actress (1939–2014)

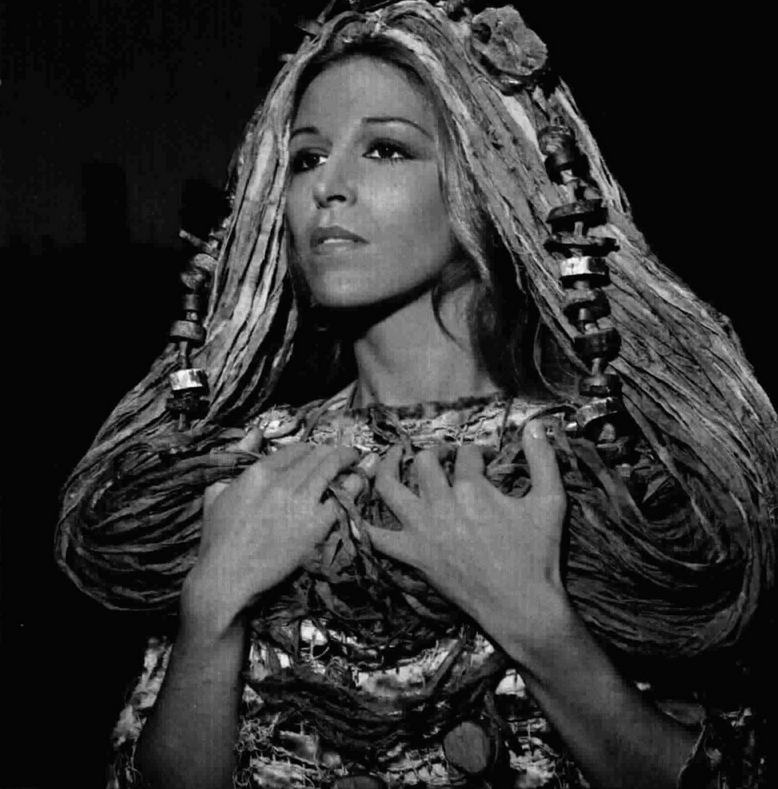
- Anna Maria Gherardi in the TV series Eneide (1971)
- Born: 15 October 1939; Bologna, Kingdom of Italy
- Died: 5 October 2014 (aged 74); Rome, Italy
- Occupation: Actress

Anna Maria Gherardi (15 October 1939 – 5 October 2014) was an Italian actress and voice actress.

Born in Bologna, Gherardi formed at the drama school of the Piccolo Teatro in Milan, and debuted on stage in 1960, in Adelchi alongside Vittorio Gassman.

She was later active in the avant-garde theatre, and worked with notable directors such as Luca Ronconi and Maurizio Scaparro. In films, she was often cast in character roles, and she worked with Bernardo Bertolucci, Franco Battiato and Pasquale Festa Campanile, among others. She was also active as a voice actress in documentaries and radio dramas, and in dubbing lines in foreign films.

== Filmography ==
| Year | Title | Role | Notes |
|---|---|---|---|
| 1965 | The Possessed | Servant girl | |
| 1968 | Galileo | | |
| 1971 | Eneide | Amata | |
| 1972 | The Grand Duel | Saxon's Girl | |
| 1972 | Uno dei tre | | |
| 1974 | L'invenzione di Morel | | |
| 1976 | 1900 | Eleonora | |
| 1977 | L'assassino speranza delle donne | | |
| 1983 | Petomaniac | Misia Edwards | |
| 1995 | Favola contaminata | Rosa Stelling | |
| 1996 | Stealing Beauty | Chiarella Donati | |
| 2001 | Light of My Eyes | Donna benestante | |
| 2002 | Fortezza Bastiani | Prof. Cantaluppi | Uncredited |
| 2003 | Perduto amor | Augusta | |
| 2005 | Il silenzio dell'allodola | Madre di Bobby | |
| 2007 | Niente è come sembra | Anna | (final film role) |
