= Edinburgh Law School =

Law school in Scotland

Coordinates: 55°56′50.6″N 3°11′13.9″W

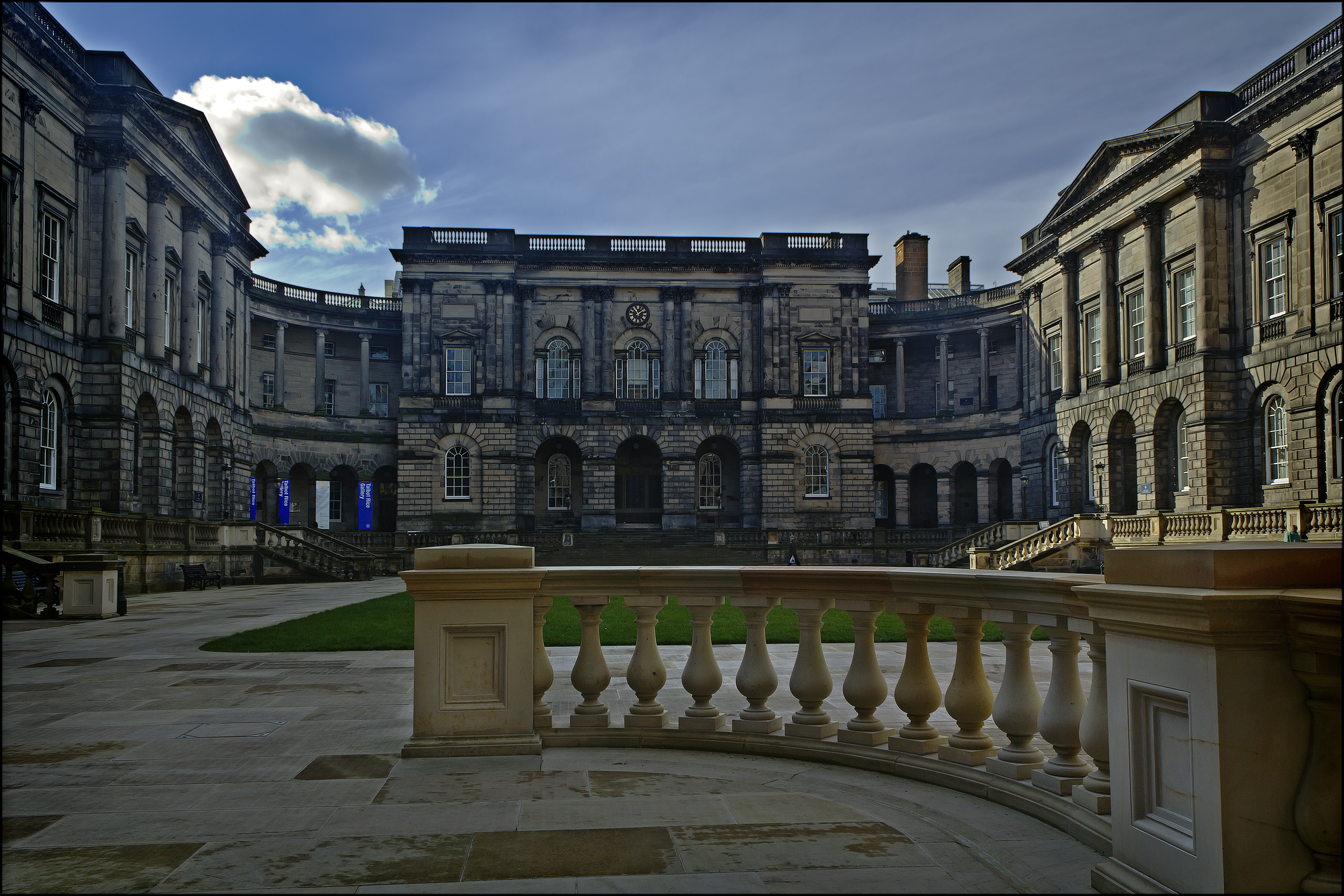
- Established: 1707; 319 years ago (Regius Chair of Public Law and the Law of Nature and Nations)
- Affiliations: Part of the College of Humanities and Social Science
- Head of School: Jo Shaw
- Academic staff: 290
- Administrative staff: 54
- Students: 1,930
- Undergraduates: 955
- Postgraduates: 980
- Location: Edinburgh, Scotland
- Offer rate: 2018 undergraduate offer rate by fee status: 27% (Scotland/EU), 20% (rest of UK), 61% (overseas), 89% (graduate entry)
Colours
- Website: www.law.ed.ac.uk

Edinburgh Law School is a department within the College of Arts, Humanities and Social Sciences at the University of Edinburgh in Scotland. It was founded in 1707.

It is located in the historic Old College, the original site of the University. Two of the twelve currently sitting Supreme Court of the United Kingdom justices are graduates of Edinburgh, including the current President and Deputy President.

In 2014, the Research Excellence Framework commissioned by the UK government, ranked the University of Edinburgh 1st in Scotland and 4th in the UK. The 2022 league table rankings from The Guardian placed Edinburgh at 10th in the UK. The 2022 Complete University Guide league rankings placed Edinburgh at 8th in the UK. The 2018 The Times league rankings placed Edinburgh at 11th in the UK. Edinburgh Law School was placed 17th in the world and 6th in the UK for law in the 2023 QS World University Rankings by Subject: Law & Legal Studies.

== History ==
In 1707, the year of the unification of the Kingdoms of Scotland and England into the Kingdom of Great Britain, Queen Anne established the Chair of Public Law and the Law of Nature and Nations in the University of Edinburgh, to which Charles Erskine (or Areskine) was appointed; this was the formal start of the Faculty of Law. By 1722 the University had four Professors of Law, and classes—in Civil Law, Scots Law and History—were usually given in their respective homes or offices. Numbers grew with the expansion of the legal profession in the 19th century, and by 1830 there were over 200 students attending the Scots Law class alone. Scholarship amongst the academics at Edinburgh continued to grow in reputation, with the work of Muirhead, Lorimer and Rankine achieving international renown.

The Faculty of Law had moved to Old College, built in 1789, and in 1862 the new degree of LL.B. (Bachelor of Laws) was introduced, following the Universities (Scotland) Act 1858. The degree was only open to graduates, usually those who had studied for the M.A.(Arts) at a Scottish University or the B.A. at Oxford or Cambridge. Students of the LL.B. had to attend courses and be examined in Civil Law, Conveyancing, Public law, Constitutional law and History, and Medical Jurisprudence; Edinburgh was the only University to offer this degree for some time. In 1909 Eveline MacLaren and Josephine Gordon Stuart became Scotland's first two female law graduates when they each obtained an LL.B degree from Edinburgh. By 1966, the LL.B. had become a full-time undergraduate course, although many would continue to study for an Arts degree beforehand. In 1981, Edinburgh first offered the Diploma in Legal Practice, for LL.B. students wishing to enter the legal profession.

Today, the School of Law is associated both with traditional Scots law and with innovation across a wide range of subjects. The School retains a reputation for scholarship in topics such as Roman Law but is also known as a centre for research in topics such as European law, criminology, commercial law, intellectual property and information technology law, labour law, European private law, medical law and ethics, international law, comparative law, and human rights law. In 2007 the School celebrated its Tercentenary year, marked by a series of events and of lectures by world-renowned legal experts.

== Academics ==
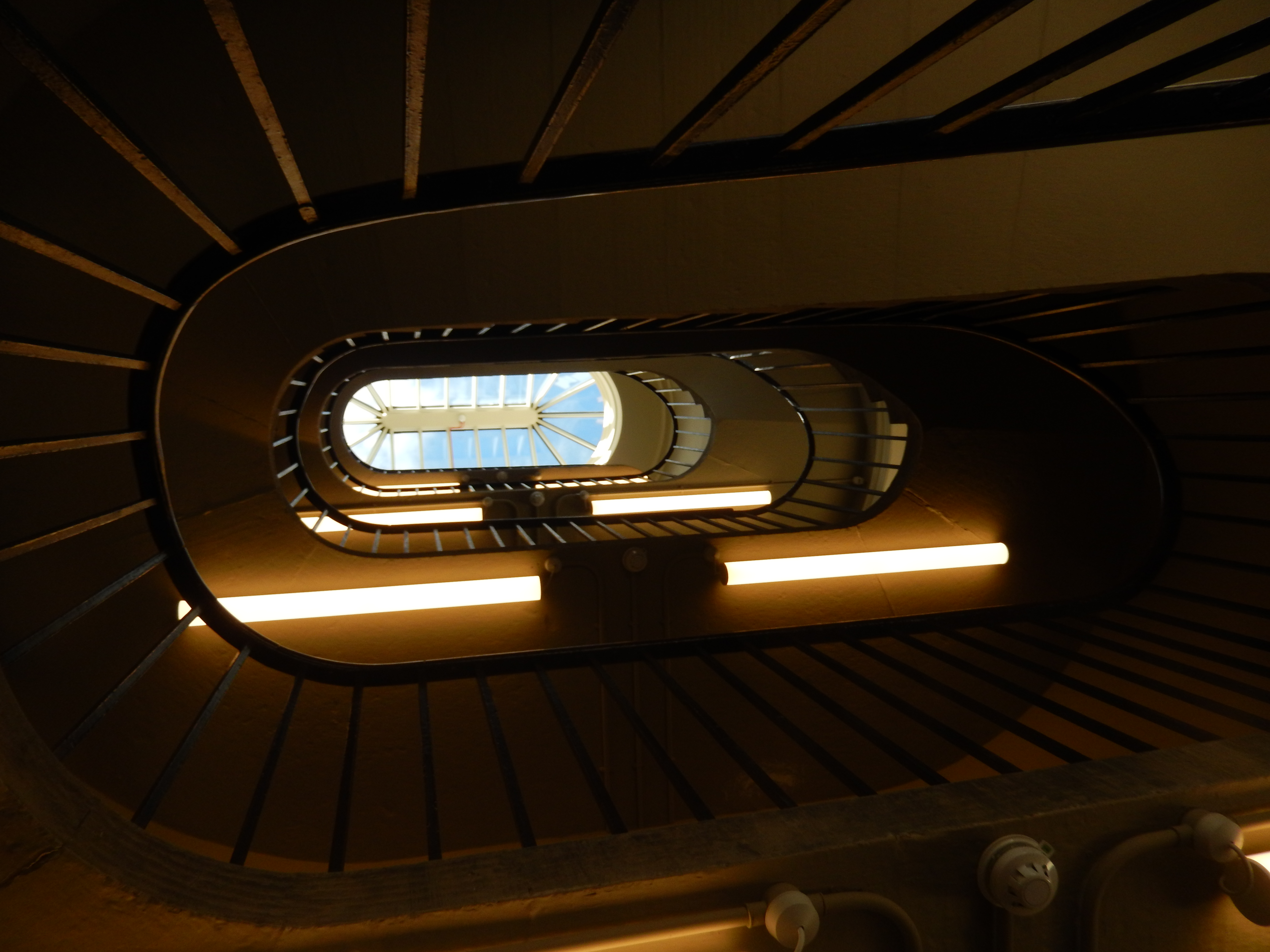

Rankings
National rankings
- Complete (2027): 7
- Guardian (2026): 15
- Times / Sunday Times (2026): 12

Global rankings
- ARWU (2025): 51-75
- QS (2026): 15
- THE (2026): 17

Throughout its history the School (or Faculty) of Law has accommodated some of the leading legal scholars in Europe. James Muirhead's work on Roman Law garnered international praise, Professor Erskine's Principles (1754) became a standard text in Scots Law, as did those of Professor George Joseph Bell. In the 20th-century, the eminent legal theorist Professor Sir Neil MacCormick wrote his seminal texts on legal philosophy as Regius Professor at Edinburgh.

Current members of Edinburgh Law School include Head of School and Salvesen Chair Jo Shaw, current Regius Professor Neil Walker; Lord President Reid Professor of Law Alexandra Braun; Professor of European Union Law Professor Niamh Nic Shuibhne; the academic and novelist Professor Sir Alexander McCall Smith; former Judge at the European Court of First Instance Sir David Edward KC, former Scottish Law Commissioners Emeritus Professor George Gretton, Emeritus Professor Hector MacQueen, Professor Andrew Steven, Emeritus Professor Kenneth Reid and Emeritus Professor Robert Black KC architect of the Pan Am Flight 103 bombing trial).

== Student activity ==
Students of the School of Law are represented by the Law Students' Council. The University of Edinburgh Law Society, known as LawSoc, provides a programme of social events. In addition, there is a Postgraduate Students' Research Committee for doctoral level students, as well as a Graduate Law Students' Society. The University Mooting Society is active, with two internal competitions and several external competitions running during each academic session, giving students the opportunity to develop the skills of oral legal argument. For graduate-level students there are a number of subject-specific discussion groups which meet on a regular basis.

Since 2008, students have published an academic journal called Edinburgh Student Law Review.

== Research centres ==
- The Centre for Law and Society
- The Centre for Legal History
- "SCRIPT" (The AHRC Centre for Studies in Intellectual Property and Technology Law)
- The Edinburgh Centre for Legal Theory
- The Edinburgh Centre for Private Law
- The Europa Institute
- The Scottish Centre for International Law
- The Joseph Bell Centre for Forensic Statistics and Legal Reasoning, joint research collaboration with Glasgow Caledonian University
- The Edinburgh Study of Youth Transitions and Crime
- The Centre for Commercial Law, Chaired by The Rt Hon. Lord Reed

== Notable alumni ==
Notable alumni of Edinburgh Law School include:

- Douglas Alexander MP, former Secretary of State for International Development
- Michael Ancram QC, Marquess of Lothian, former MP and Chairman of the Conservative Party
- Henry Brougham, Lord High Chancellor of Great Britain, co-founder of the University College London
- Joanna Cherry, current Scottish National Party MP for Edinburgh South-West
- James Clyde, Baron Clyde, Lord of Appeal in Ordinary
- Thomas Campbell, poet
- George Combe, founder of the Edinburgh Phrenological Society
- Paul Cullen, Lord Pentland, Lord President of the Court of Session
- William Cullen, Baron Cullen of Whitekirk, former Lord President of the Court of Session and Lord of Appeal in Ordinary
- Alistair Duff, former Director of the Judicial Institute of Scotland
- Henry Dundas, 1st Viscount Melville, Lord Advocate of Scotland, British Home Secretary, first Secretary of State for War and First Lord of the Admiralty
- Robert Dundas of Arniston, the younger, Lord Advocate of Scotland, Lord President of the Court of Session
- Sir David Edward QC, former Judge at the European Court of Justice
- Nicholas Fairbairn, Conservative MP for Perth and Kinross and Solicitor General for Scotland
- Robert J. Faucher, U.S Assistant Secretary of State for Conflict and Stabilization Operations
- Brian Gill, Lord Gill, former Lord President (Ph.D)
- Peter Goodrich, Director of Law and Humanities at the Benjamin N. Cardozo School of Law (Ph.D.)
- Katherine Grainger, 2012 Olympic Gold Medallist
- Arthur Hamilton, Lord Hamilton, former Lord President of the Court of Session
- Lord Hodge, sitting Justice of the Supreme Court of the United Kingdom
- Michael Hay, founder of Hay, Kalb & Associates, the first (and to date only) foreign law firm in North Korea
- Lord Hope of Craighead, former Lord of Appeal in Ordinary and inaugural Deputy President of the Supreme Court of the United Kingdom
- Eleanor Laing, Deputy Speaker of the House of Commons
- Lord Mackay of Clashfern, former Lord Chancellor and Lord Advocate of Scotland
- Eveline MacLaren, one of Scotland's first women to complete her legal studies and graduate from the Faculty of Law
- Stuart McDonald, current Scottish National Party MP for Cumbernauld, Kilsyth and Kirkintilloch East
- David McLetchie MSP, former Scottish Conservative leader
- David Mundell, current Conservative MP and Secretary of State for Scotland
- Ian Murray, current Labour MP and Shadow Secretary of State for Scotland
- Lord Reed, sitting Justice and current President of the Supreme Court of the United Kingdom
- Sir Malcolm Rifkind QC MP, former Foreign Secretary
- Julia Sebutinde, current member of the International Court of Justice and first African woman to serve as member of the Court
- Alexander McCall Smith, Emeritus Professor of Medical Law at the University of Edinburgh, co-founder of the law school at the University of Botswana, adult mystery author
- Matt Soper, current member of the Colorado House of Representatives and first Seventh-day Adventist to serve as member of the Colorado Legislature
- David Steel, Baron Steel of Aikwood, former Presiding Officer of the Scottish Parliament and former leader of the Liberal Party
- Colin Sutherland, Lord Carloway, former Lord President of the Court of Session
- Simon Taylor, Scottish Rugby Footballer
- Lord Wallace QC, former Deputy First Minister of Scotland and Advocate General for Scotland
- Sir Thomas Winsor, HM Chief Inspector of Constabulary and former Rail Regulator and International Rail Regulator
- Rt Hon James Wolffe, former Lord Advocate of Scotland
- Lady Sarah Wolffe, former Senator of the Court of Justice.

== Notable faculty ==
- Sir Neil MacCormick, Regius Professor of Public Law and the Law of Nature and Nations
- Harvey McGregor QC, visiting professor, Warden of New College, Oxford
