= Sybil Campbell =

First woman professional judge in the United Kingdom (1889–1977)

Sybil Campbell OBE
- Born: 9 October 1889; British Ceylon
- Died: 29 August 1977 (aged 87); Langside, Glasgow, Scotland
- Burial place: Lochgilphead, Argyll, Scotland
- Education: Girton College, Cambridge (1908–1913); Middle Temple (1920–1922)
- Occupation: Stipendiary magistrate
- Years active: 1945–1961
- Relatives: William Bovill (Grandfather)

Sybil Campbell OBE (9 October 1889 – 29 August 1977) was the first woman to be appointed as a stipendiary magistrate in Britain when she became metropolitan police magistrate at Tower Bridge Magistrate's Court in 1945. She was thus the first woman to be a professional magistrate or judge in Britain, and remained the only full-time woman magistrate or judge in England until her retirement in 1961 and the appointment of Elizabeth Lane as a county court judge in 1962.

== Early life ==
Campbell was born on 9 October 1889 in British Ceylon, where her father was an agent of a tea company, but she had family roots in Argyll. Her maternal grandfather was Sir William Bovill, Chief Justice of the Common Pleas, who presided at the long-running Tichborne case. She was educated at home and then from the age of 13 at a school in North Berwick. She studied Natural Sciences and Economics at Girton College, Cambridge from 1908, after some preparatory study in Paris and Edinburgh.

== Legal career ==
She was an investigating officer with the Trade Boards from 1913 to 1918, and an enforcement officer with the Ministry of Food in the First World War. After the Sex Disqualification (Removal) Act 1919 removed barriers on women becoming barristers and solicitors, Ivy Williams was the first woman to be called to the bar in England, at the Inner Temple in May 1922. Campbell joined the Middle Temple in 1920, and was one of ten women called to the bar at Middle Temple on 17 November 1922.

She practised as a barrister in the chambers of H. H. Joy, and returned to the Ministry of Food as an Enforcement Officer in London in the Second World War. For this work, she was appointed as an officer of the Order of the British Empire in 1942.

The Sex Disqualification (Removal) Act also allowed women to become judges, and there were around 3700 women justices of the peace (unpaid lay magistrates) by 1947, but no women had been appointed as full-time professional judge until Campbell was appointed as a stipendiary magistrate by the Home Secretary Herbert Morrison in April 1945. Despite some questions about her suitability for the office, her appointment was confirmed, and she quickly gained a reputation for passing severe sentences. Despite some initial controversy in the press, she continued as a stipendiary magistrate until she reached the mandatory retirement age of 72 in 1962. Although Dorothy Knight Dix was appointed as deputy recorder of Deal in January 1946 and Rose Heilbron was appointed as recorder for Burnley in November 1956, Campbell remained the only woman to be appointed as a full-time judge in Britain until Elizabeth Lane became a county court judge in 1962.

== Later life ==
She was Honorary Secretary of the British Federation of University Women from 1921 to 1933 and its honorary vice-president from 1947 to 1977. She was deeply involved in the establishment of Crosby Hall in Chelsea as a hall of residence for international women postgraduate students. Campbell was also a member of the council at Girton College from 1933 to 1942.

Campbell then retired to Lochgilphead, Argyll. She died at Bon Secours Nursing Home in Langside, Glasgow on 29 August 1977 and was buried in Lochgilphead. She never married.
