= Scottish Prisons Commission =

The Scottish Prisons Commission was a commission established by the Scottish Government in 2007 to "analyse the impact for courts, prisons and community justice services of early release provisions contained in the Custodial Sentences and Weapons (Scotland) Act 2007".

== Terms of reference ==
The terms of reference were:

- Consider how imprisonment is currently used in Scotland and how that use fits with the Government’s wider strategic objectives.
- Raise the public profile of this issue, providing better information to allow a deeper understanding of the options, outcomes and costs.
- Assess the impact for courts, prisons and community justice services of early release provisions of the Custodial Sentences and Weapons (Scotland) Act 2007.

== Members ==
The members were:

- Henry McLeish (Chair) – former First Minister of Scotland, Minister for Enterprise and Lifelong Learning, Minister for Devolution and Home Affairs
- Dr Karin Dotter-Schiller – Acting Director-General, Prison Service in the Federal Ministry of Justice in Vienna, Austria; founder member, International Corrections and Prisons Association
- Sheriff Alistair Duff – Dundee; Chair, Dundee branch of the Scottish Association for the Study of Offending
- Geraldine Gammell – Director, The Prince's Trust in Scotland
- Richard Jeffrey – President, Edinburgh Chamber of Commerce; Chair, Edinburgh Tourism Action Group
- Lesley Riddoch – broadcaster and journalist
- Chief Constable David Strang – Lothian and Borders Police

== See also ==
- Prison Commission (Scotland), a defunct public body that oversaw the operation of prisons in Scotland from 1877-1939
- Prison Commission (England and Wales), a defunct public body that oversaw the operation of prisons in England and Wales from 1877-1963
