= Gillian Guzman =

Gibraltarian lawyer

Gillian Maria Guzman KC
- Education: University of Wales
- Occupation: Barrister
- Employer: Hassans
- Known for: First female Queen's Counsel in Gibraltar

Gillian Guzman QC is a Gibraltarian barrister specializing in civil and criminal litigation. In 2012, she became the first woman to be appointed Queen’s Counsel in Gibraltar, and the youngest person in the jurisdiction to receive the appointment.

== Education ==
Guzman studied law at the University of Wales in Cardiff. She was called to the Gibraltar Bar in 1994.

== Career ==
Guzman has appeared in courts at all levels in Gibraltar and has also participated in proceedings before the Judicial Committee of the Privy Council as junior counsel. In 2004, Guzman chaired the first Human Rights Symposium held in Gibraltar and has participated in international discussions on human rights, including panels addressing the rights of children. In 2006, she became chair of the Industrial Tribunal. Working for Hassans, the largest law firm in Gibraltar, she has represented clients such as the Gibraltar Health Authority on legislation and employment concerns.

In March 2012, she was invited to the Queen's Counsel. Guzman is the first woman to be appointed QC in Gibraltar and the youngest woman to ever be appointed QC at the age of 29 according to Gibraltar International.

== Awards and recognition ==
Guzman has been recognized in international legal directories for her work in litigation. She has been ranked by Chambers and Partners, which noted her experience in civil and criminal law and her involvement in human rights litigation.

== Legacy ==
As the first woman to be appointed Queen’s Counsel in Gibraltar, Guzman is regarded as a pioneering figure in the territory’s legal profession. Her achievement has been cited in discussions on gender representation in law and the advancement of women within senior legal ranks.
