= The Dirty Outlaws =

1967 film

- Wild East DVD Cover
- Directed by: Franco Rossetti
- Written by: Vincenzo Cerami; Ugo Guerra; Franco Rossetti; Elio Scardamaglia
- Produced by: Ugo Guerra; Elio Scardamaglia
- Starring: Andrea Giordana; Rosemary Dexter; Franco Giornelli; Dana Ghia
- Cinematography: Angelo Filippini
- Edited by: Antonietta Zita
- Music by: Gianni Ferrio
- Release date: 1967
- Running time: 103 minutes
- Country: Italy
- Language: Italian

The Dirty Outlaws, also known as Big Ripoff, King of the West and The Desperado (Italian: El desperado), is a 1967 Italian spaghetti Western starring Andrea Giordana.

Quentin Tarantino ranked the film 13th in his personal "Top 20 favorite Spaghetti Westerns".

== Plot ==
An outlaw masquerades as a blind man's son in order to trick him into a cache of gold. After a while he grows attached to the family and all goes well until the outlaws gang comes through town...

== Cast ==
- Andrea Giordana as Steve Belasco
- Rosemarie Dexter as Katie
- Franco Giornelli as Asher
- Dana Ghia as Lucy
- Aldo Berti as Jonathan
- Piero Lulli as Sam
- Andrea Scotti as Togo
- Giovanni Petrucci as Xavier
- Dino Strano as James
- Antonio Cantafora as Bill
- John Bartha as a soldier

== Releases ==
Wild East released the film on an out-of-print limited edition Region 0 NTSC DVD in 2006.
