= George Gretton =

Scottish lawyer and academic

George Lidderdale Gretton WS FRSE (born 10 November 1950) is a Scottish lawyer and academic and, from May 2006 to May 2011, was a Commissioner of the Scottish Law Commission.

== Career ==
Gretton had his early education at West House School and King Edward's School, Birmingham. In 1972 he graduated with a 2:1 degree in Philosophy and English Literature at the University of Durham (Hatfield College). He then read law at the University of Edinburgh. He was appointed to a lectureship in law at the university in 1981. He became Lord President Reid Professor of Law in 1994 and held the chair until his retirement in 2016 when he became Professor Emeritus. He has published widely on commercial law, property law, trusts, insolvency law, comparative law and legal history; he is a Solicitor, a Notary Public and a Writer to the Signet.

He is the author of several textbooks on conveyancing (co-written with former Scottish Law Commissioner, Kenneth Reid); property, trusts and succession law (co-written with former Scottish Law Commissioner, Andrew Steven), the law of inhibitions and adjudications (the diligences, or mechanisms for enforcing judgments, affecting land in Scotland); and searches.

At the Scottish Law Commission, Gretton was the lead commissioner for the project considering reform to the Scottish system of land registration. This project resulted in a comprehensive report published in 2010. The report was received favourably by the Scottish Parliament, and the majority of its recommendations were enacted into the Land Registration etc. (Scotland) Act 2012, which came into force in December 2014. This new Act repealed most of the Land Registration (Scotland) Act 1979, which the Report highlighted as inadequate.

== Personal life ==
He is married with three children.

He and Kenneth Reid have known each other since they were both students together at the University of Edinburgh. They were appointed professors in the same year and for over thirty years have given an annual lecture together on what has happened in conveyancing in the previous twelve months.
