= Lubna Shuja =

British solicitor and mediator

Lubna Shuja (born 22 May 1967) is a British solicitor and mediator. She served as the 178th President of the Law Society of England and Wales from 2022 to 2023. She was the first Asian and first Muslim to serve as president, and the seventh woman to hold the office. She is a member of the Ministry of Justice's Online Procedure Rule Sub-Committee.

== Early life and education ==
Shuja was born in Bradford, West Yorkshire, England, to parents who moved to the United Kingdom during the 1960s from Pakistan and Kenya. She attended Carlton Bolling School before studying law at the Polytechnic of Central London (now the University of Westminster), where she obtained a Law LLB degree. She completed the Law Society Finals at the College of Law (now the University of Law) and qualified as a solicitor in 1992.

== Career ==
Shuja qualified as a solicitor in 1992 after beginning her legal career as an articled clerk at Fladgate Fielder in London. She subsequently worked at Sampson Horner in Bradford, where she became a partner. In 2007, she founded Legal Swan Solicitors in Birmingham. She has also worked as a civil and family mediator.

She has chaired fitness-to-practise and professional conduct proceedings for bodies including the General Pharmaceutical Council, Social Work England and the Architects Registration Board, and has served on panels for the General Chiropractic Council, the Health and Care Professions Tribunal Service and the Association of Chartered Certified Accountants. She also served as a deputy clerk at the Solicitors Disciplinary Tribunal.

She joined the Law Society Council in 2013 and was elected deputy vice-president in 2020 and vice-president in 2021. She served as president of the Law Society of England and Wales in 2022–2023, becoming the first Asian and first Muslim to hold the position and the seventh woman to serve as president. During her term, she represented the profession on issues including legal aid, access to justice, professional ethics, immigration law and the rule of law. She also participated in discussions on the opening of India's legal services market to solicitors from England and Wales.

In 2024, Shuja joined the Ministry of Justice's Online Procedure Rule Sub-Committee. She has continued to hold regulatory and disciplinary appointments, including roles with professional regulatory bodies.

== Honors and awards ==
- 2026 – Honorary Doctor of Laws, Leeds Beckett University
- 2026 – Outstanding Achievement Award, Women and Diversity in Law Awards.
- 2025 – Honorary Doctor of Laws, University of West London.
- 2024 – Honorary Doctor of Laws, Aston University.
- 2023 – Lifetime Achievement Award, University of Westminster.
- 2023 – Outstanding Achievement Award, Asian Legal Awards.
- 2022 – Honorary Doctor of Laws, The University of Law.
- 2022 – Carrie Morrison Woman of the Year Award, UK–India Legal Partnership.
