= Agnes Twiston Hughes =

Welsh solicitor and mayor

- Born: 28 September 1895; Wales
- Died: 20 October 1981 (aged 86); Conwy, Wales

Agnes Twiston Hughes (28 September 1895 – 20 October 1981) was a Welsh solicitor and mayor of Conwy. She studied at the University of London and became the first woman in Wales to qualify as a solicitor. She worked at her father's firm after she graduated, eventually taking over the business following his death. She later became a local councillor before becoming Mayor of Conwy in 1954.

== Early life ==
Hughes was born in 1895, one of two daughters born to John William Hughes. Her paternal grandfather had been a joiner but her father had instead become a clerk at a solicitor's office in England at the age of 19. Her father became a qualified solicitor at 41 and moved to Conwy in North Wales to set up his practice, JW Hughes.

Her father hoped to provide his daughters with an education and sent them both to the Welsh Girls' School in Ashford, Surrey. They later attended Bangor County School for Girls. Hughes went on to attend the University of London where she gained a second-class Bachelor of Science (Economics) in 1918. She also gained first-class honours from the Law Society and was first in her class for both male and female students in her Law Finals class of 1923. In doing so, she became the first Welsh woman to qualify as a solicitor. She was awarded The Sheffield Prize and The John Mackrell Prize by The Council of the Law Society, receiving £35 and £13 for the awards respectively.

== Career ==
After graduating, Hughes returned to Conwy and took up a position at her father's solicitor firm as an articled clerk. She eventually rose to become a senior partner in the firm before succeeding her father as principal when he died in 1949. She retired in 1961. Hughes became a local councillor after standing as an independent candidate and, in 1954, she became the first female Mayor of Conwy and served until the following year. As mayor, she "broke with tradition" by moving the annual civic service from its traditional venue to the Methodist Chapel that she attended.

== Personal life ==
Hughes was a keen golfer and played for Conwy Golf Club. She became club captain in 1948. Hughes died on 20 October 1981.

In May 2018, Hughes was named on a shortlist of 100 women who were selected as possible choices for the first statute of a female figure in Cardiff. Hughes was omitted from the final shortlist of five before Betty Campbell was chosen as the overall winner.
