= Beatrice Honour Davy =

British barrister and solicitor (1885–1966)

- Born: 13 December 1885; Exeter, England
- Died: 18 April 1966 (aged 80); Woodmancote, Horsham District, West Sussex, England
- Education: King’s College, London
- Occupations: Barrister and later solicitor
- Known for: Early woman lawyer

Beatrice Honour Davy (13 December 1885 – 18 April 1966) was a British barrister, and later, solicitor. She was amongst the first women to be called to the bar once the legal barriers to entry for females were dismantled in 1919. In 1922, she and seven others were the first women ever admitted to the Middle Temple. Davy was the first woman to appear as advocate at the Devon Assizes, winning a 1923 divorce case for her client. After she requalified as a solicitor in 1931, Davy and fellow solicitor Edith Berthen established the first all-female law firm in Britain. The firm continued operating until 1951.

== Early life ==
Davy was born in Exeter in 1885. Her father was a physician and in 1887 was Sheriff of Exeter. In recognition of his war work as consultant physician to the Southern Command, Sir Henry Davy was knighted, being created K.B.E. in 1919. Beatrice Davy's mother, Beatrice Mary, née Tucker, was a solicitor's daughter; she died in 1905, and Davy's father later remarried. Davy's paternal grandfather—Sir Henry's father—was also a solicitor. Davy was educated at Grassendale School, Southbourne, in Bournemouth.

During the First World War her only brother was killed. In her own wartime career, Davy assisted Dame Georgina Buller to organise and equip the Devon Group of War Hospitals.

== Legal career ==
The Sex Disqualification (Removal) Act, allowing women to become lawyers, was passed in 1919. In 1921, Davy graduated from King’s College, London with an LL.B. law degree. She had earlier applied to become a student member of the Middle Temple and had been admitted on 24 January 1920. On 17 December 1922 she was admitted to full membership of Middle Temple, among the first eight women to be allowed entry. In 1923, she was the first woman to appear as a barrister at the Devon Assizes in Exeter. She won the divorce case for the abandoned husband in Weber v. Weber & Payne. Three years later she joined the Inner Temple, ad eundem ('at the same level').

Davy practised law in London in the first British law firm run exclusively by women, with legal partner Edith Annie Berthen in 1931. Later, Madge Easton Anderson was articled to the firm. In 1937, Anderson became the first woman qualified to practice as a solicitor in both England and Scotland. Upon gaining her qualification for England, she became a partner in the Berthen and Davy firm.

Davy practised law until 1951. She died at her home, "Rosemullion", in the West Sussex village of Woodmancote in 1966. She left her estate to her friend, the distinguished dermatologist, Elizabeth Hunt (1876—1977).
