= Prison Commission (Scotland) =

The Prison Commission was a public body of the Government of the United Kingdom established in 1877 and responsible for the operation of what is now the Scottish Prison Service. It was renamed the Prison Department in 1928, and was merged with the Scottish Office to become the Scottish Home Department in 1939.

== History ==
Prisons (Scotland) Act 1877 (Note: Section 1.)
- Act of Parliament
- Parliament of the United Kingdom
- Long title: An Act to amend the Law relating to Prisons in Scotland.
- Citation: 40 & 41 Vict. c. 53
- Territorial extent: Scotland (Note: Section 2.)

Dates
- Royal assent: 14 August 1877
- Commencement: 1 April 1878 (Note: Section 3.)

Other legislation
- Amended by: Children Act 1908; Reorganisation of Offices (Scotland) Act 1939; Local Government (Scotland) Act 1947; Criminal Justice (Scotland) Act 1949; Statute Law Revision Act 1950; Prisons (Scotland) Act 1952
- Relates to: Prison Act 1877

Status: Amended

Text of statute as originally enacted

Revised text of statute as amended

Text of the Prisons (Scotland) Act 1877 as in force today (including any amendments) within the United Kingdom, from legislation.gov.uk.

The Prison Commission was established under the Prisons (Scotland) Act 1877 (40 & 41 Vict. c. 53) as a statutory board to administer and inspect prisons in Scotland in accordance with the general or special directions of the Secretary of State (the Home Secretary). It took over the executive powers and the property rights of the Home Secretary, but considerable powers remained with the Home Office, including the appointment of a chairman from among the commissioners, of the Prison Inspectorate and of the senior officers of each prison, the approval of appointments of staff made by the commissioners and the regulation of visiting committees of justices. The commissioners were appointed by royal warrant on the recommendation of the Home Secretary and were salaried. A similar body for England and Wales was also created in the same year, also called the Prison Commission.

The commission was a body corporate of not more than three members, of which one was to be the Sheriff of the County of Perth and another the Crown Agent for Scotland, and was empowered to hold property for the purposes of the act. Its duties included the maintenance of all prisons, the appointment of subordinate prison staff, the inspection of prison buildings and the condition of prisoners, and the exercise of powers formerly vested in visiting justices and inspectors of prisons. It also submitted annual reports on every prison to the Home Office for presentation to Parliament, together with other returns. The reports included details of manufacturing processes carried on by prisoners within the prisons. The commissioners were assisted in their work by a central staff, by the Prison Inspectorate and by visiting committees of justices, which acted under regulations drawn up by the Home Office. The first appointed commissioner was John Hill Burton, who had previously been secretary to the Prison Board of Scotland.

In 1885, the post of Secretary for Scotland was created, and along with it the Scottish Office, and responsibility for the commission passed to him. In 1926 the office of Secretary for Scotland was upgraded to become Secretary of State for Scotland. In 1928, the commission, along with the Scottish Board of Health and the Board of Agriculture for Scotland, was abolished and transferred to become a department of the new Secretary of State. The existing commissioners were transferred to the Scottish Office and no further commissioners were appointed.

In 1938, the Report of the Departmental Committee on Scottish Administration recommended that the departments be merged with the Scottish Office, and 1939 the Scottish Education Department, Department of Health for Scotland, Department of Agriculture for Scotland, Fishery Board for Scotland and the Prisons Department for Scotland merged to become the Scottish Home Department.

== See also ==
- Prison Commission (England and Wales), the sister body to the Commission in Scotland
- Scottish Prisons Commission, a review body established in 2007 to report on the prison service in Scotland
