= Prisons in Wales =

Overview of prisons operating in Wales

Prisons in Wales

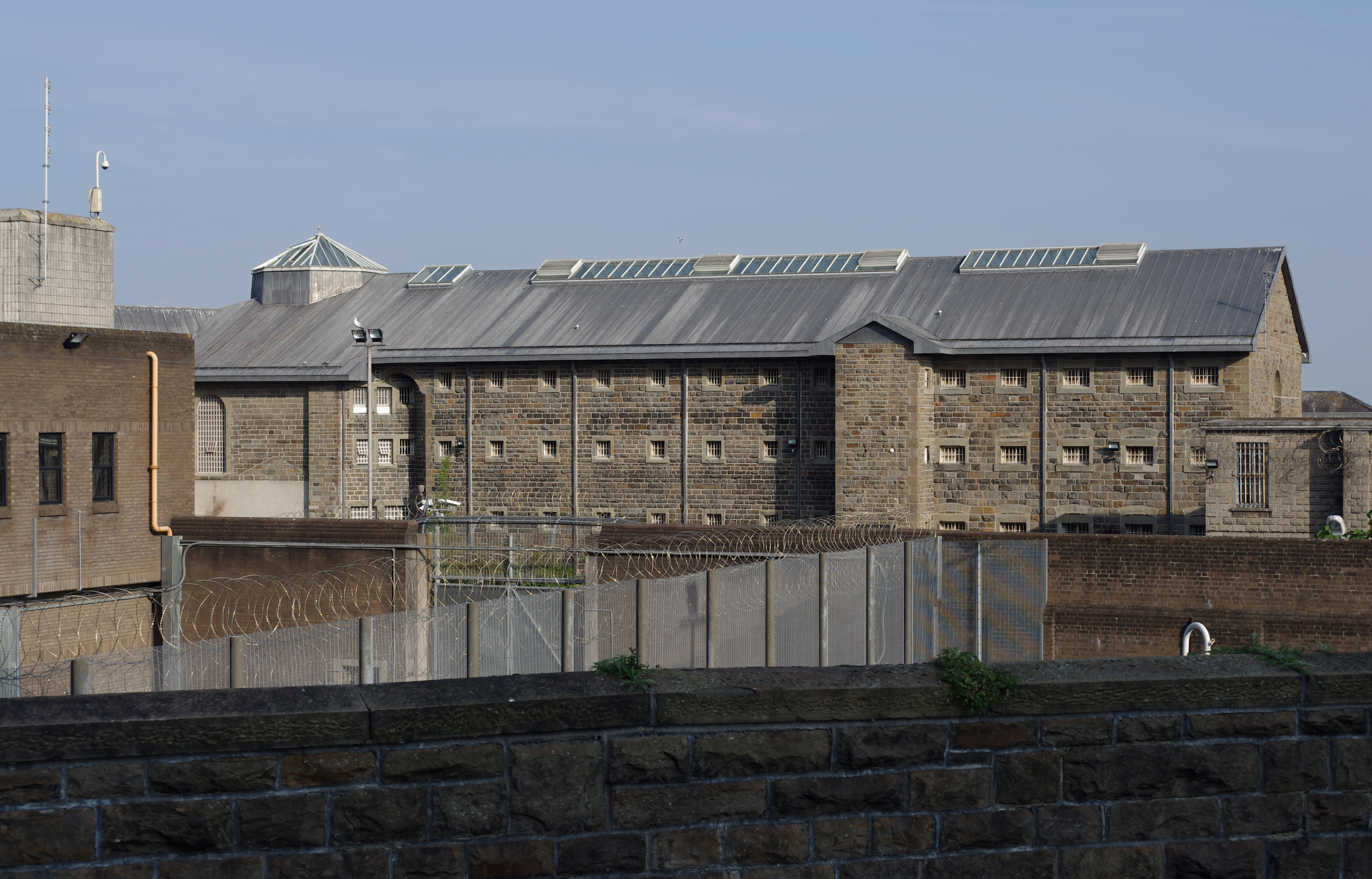
HM Prison Cardiff in 2010

The prisons in Wales are run by His Majesty's Prison Service, which is in turn a part of HM Prison and Probation Service (HMPPS) which is an executive agency of the Ministry of Justice responsible for the correctional services in England and Wales. The objectives of prison confinement in Wales is threefold: to "hold prisoners securely", to "reduce the risk of prisoners re-offending" and to "provide safe and well-ordered establishments in which we treat prisoners humanely, decently and lawfully".

Although the concept of incarceration as a punishment for wrongdoing did not exist in Wales, as in the rest of Britain, during the medieval period, from Tudor times onwards correction houses began appearing throughout the country. In the 18th century several buildings began taking on the function of modern prisons, and in 1878 Welsh prisons came under centralised government control. Today there are five prisons in Wales; three are run directly by the government with Parc Prison in Bridgend being Wales' only privatised gaol.

== History of prisons in Wales ==
The concept of incarcerating individuals as a punishment for crimes did not exist in Wales before or during the medieval period. The early castles of the Welsh rulers and marcher-lords did possess dungeons, but the purpose of these facilities were for the confinement of hostages and political prisoners, people who may have committed no crime. Up to the 17th century the most common punishments for criminal offences were fines, corporal punishment and executions. The earliest forms of prisons, which began appearing in the early modern period, were created for the purposes of holding those awaiting trial and to house debtors. From the Tudor period magistrates were given powers by the state to establish correction houses for the punishment of those committing petty crimes and a way to amend the ways of vagrants.

From the 18th century the institutions that would begin to have the function of modern prisons began to appear in Aberystwyth, Bangor and Beaumaris. These buildings were used to house criminals for a set period of time after being sentenced by a court. The condition of early prisons in Wales was rudimentary and with few amenities for the imprisoned. In his 1777 work State of the Prisons prison reformer John Howard mentions two Welsh gaols, Caernarfon county gaol and Swansea town gaol. Caernarfon is described as having neither drainage or fresh water and the inmates housed in tiny windowless cells.

Prisons in Wales were often of very poor build, many of which were not built for the purpose of housing prisoners, and were often the sites of existing buildings. Haverfordwest prison was originally built in the inner ward of a ruined castle in 1778. It was considered unfit for prisoners in 1819, while Cardiff Gaol was deemed insufficient in 1814. Some prisons were built for purpose, including Beaumaris Gaol (1829) in Anglesey.

In 1878 the prison system in Wales was nationalised and came under centralised government control. This led to better conditions and fewer, larger prisons. The smaller prisons and gaols across the country were closed and the location of the prisons centralised.

Until 2017 there was no provision for prisoners in northern Wales, with prisoners sent to prisons in Liverpool and further afield. In 2009 a site was discussed for a new prison in Caernarfon to address the issue of Welsh prisoners who are housed in England, but this fell through. In 2013 the government announced the construction of a new £250 million 'super prison' in Wrexham. Work on the new prison, named HMP Berwyn, commenced in 2014 and it became partially operational in February 2017.

== Current prisons in Wales ==
There are five prisons in Wales,

- Berwyn (2017) a Category C men's prison, located in Wrexham is the UK's largest prison with a capacity of 2,106. Berwyn is the Prison Service's flagship prison.
- Usk (1844) a Category C men's prison which also includes a satellite site
  - Prescoed (1939) a Category D men's open prison;
- Cardiff (1832) a Category B men's prison,
- Parc (1997) a Category B men's private prison and Young Offenders Institution, based in Bridgend, is Wales' only privatised prison and is presently run by G4S,
- Swansea (1861) a Category B/C men's prison.

Wales has no prison for either women or Category A offenders, who must be housed in gaols in England.

== Bibliography ==
Davies, John; Jenkins, Nigel (2008). The Welsh Academy Encyclopaedia of Wales. Cardiff: University of Wales Press. ISBN 978-0-7083-1953-6.
