= Lesley Riddoch =

Scottish broadcaster and journalist

Lesley Anne Riddoch (born February 1960) is a Scottish radio broadcaster, activist and journalist who lives in Fife. During the 1990s, she was a contributing editor of the Sunday Herald and an assistant editor of The Scotsman. Since 2004, she has run her own independent radio and podcast company, Feisty Ltd. In 2006, she was shortlisted for the Orwell Prize.

== Early life, education, and early career ==
Born 1960 in Wolverhampton, England, Riddoch moved with her Scottish parents to Belfast in 1963, then to Glasgow in 1973, where she attended Drewsteignton, a fee-paying private school then located in the affluent suburb of Bearsden. In 1978 she attended the University of Oxford and graduated with an honours degree in Philosophy, Politics and Economics. She was also elected president of the student union in 1981. After graduating she studied for a postgraduate diploma in journalism at Cardiff University.

== Journalism ==
She founded and directed the feminist magazine Harpies and Quines, which launched in 1992. During its lifetime, it was sued by the publication Harpers & Queen. The magazine ceased trading in 1994, having been declared bankrupt after cashflow problems.

From 1993 to 1999 she was a contributing editor of the Sunday Herald and an assistant editor of The Scotsman 1994–1996. She was editor of a special one-off edition of The Scotsman on 8 March 1995 rebranding as The Scotswoman produced by the paper's female staff. Riddoch herself featured on the front page when this rebranding occurred again to mark International Women's Day in 2016.

Writing columns for The National, The Scotsman, and occasionally The Guardian, in 2006 she was shortlisted for the Orwell Prize, an award given to those judged to be making political writing into an art form.

== Radio ==
From 1989 to 1994 she presented the BBC Radio Scotland programme Speaking Out and was an occasional relief presenter for the Radio Four programme You and Yours. In 1993 Riddoch won a Cosmopolitan woman award for Communication, and in 1994 her Radio Scotland production team won a best talk show award. One of the Speaking Out programmes took the Silver Quill Law Society award that same year.

Between 1999 and 2005, she had her own daily radio programme on Radio Scotland.

== Television ==
Riddoch presented television programmes of which include The Midnight Hour on BBC2, and The People's Parliament and Powerhouse on Channel 4.

She runs her own independent radio, podcast and TV production company known as Feisty Ltd. In 2004 she chaired the Celtic Film and Television Festival, a small festival rewarding non-English language productions. In 2008, she produced and presented an independent documentary about the history and development of the Dundee waterfront called The Great Tay Bridge Mystery – Who Dunnit?.

== Other work ==
Riddoch was involved in the buyout of Eigg by the local community. She assisted in putting together the buyout plan and later became a trustee of the Isle of Eigg Trust. The trust bought the island in 1997.

In 2007, she published her account of a cycle journey up the Outer Hebrides, Riddoch on the Outer Hebrides. This book had been based on a BBC Radio Scotland series On the Bike; in which over 13 weeks Riddoch cycled from Barra to the Butt of Lewis meeting the characters, enjoying the craic and observing the customs of the Hebridean islands.

In 2008, Riddoch served as a member of the Scottish Prisons Commission. In 2009, she acted as Chair in Task Force, set up by the Scottish Government, to transfer the island of Rùm into community ownership from Scottish Natural Heritage.

She has also worked with African women journalists to help them create a monthly webpaper called Africawoman – three editions of their own paper were distributed on trains and buses in Scotland prior to the Gleneagles summit 2005. She later received an Honorary Doctorate for the work from Glasgow Caledonian University.

In early 2010, Riddoch co-founded the think tank, Nordic Horizons with Scottish Government funding, which has brought Nordic experts and specialists to Scotland to share social policy insights and experiences.

In 2013, Riddoch published Blossom: What Scotland Needs To Flourish, in which she relates stories of Scots who have struggled against the odds to improve their communities and makes comparisons with the Nordic nations to suggest ways forward for Scotland.

2017 saw the publication of McSmorgasbord: What post-Brexit Scotland can learn from the Nordics written in partnership with Eberhard Bort. This book uses the examples of the Nordic nations to tease out the various possible relationships between an independent Scotland and the European Economic Area.
