= Elizabeth Lane =

English barrister and judge (1905–1988)

Dame Elizabeth Lane DBE

Judge of the High Court of Justice
- In office 1965–1979

Personal details
- Born: Elizabeth Kathleen Coulborn; 9 August 1905 Bowden, Cheshire, England
- Died: 17 June 1988 (aged 82) Winchester, Hampshire, England
- Spouse: Randall Lane
- Occupation: Barrister and judge

Dame Elizabeth Kathleen Lane, DBE (née Coulborn; 9 August 1905 – 17 June 1988) was an English barrister and judge. She was the first woman appointed as a judge in the County Court, the first female High Court judge in England, and the first female bencher.

== Early and private life ==
Lane was born on 9 August 1905 in Bowden, Cheshire to Edward Alexander Coulborn, a mill owner, and Kate Wilkinson. She was educated at home and lived with her family in Switzerland for a year immediately before the outbreak of the First World War. After returning to England, she attended Twizzletwig School in Hindhead, Surrey, and then Malvern Girls' College before deciding against studying at university.

She spent time with her brother in Montreal in 1924, where she met Randall Lane. They were married in Didsbury on 14 January 1926, and later lived in Manchester. They had a son John in August 1928 who had brain damage resulting from epilepsy and died in his teenage years from pneumonia.

== Career ==
After Lane's husband decided to become a barrister in 1936, they both studied the law at the same time. She became a student member of the Inner Temple in November 1937 and she was called to the bar in summer 1940. She completed her pupillage with Geoffrey Howard as her supervisor and began practising on the Midland Circuit, specialising in civil work.

In 1948, she was appointed as a member of the Home Office Committee of Enquiry to examine the use of depositions in criminal trials. She was appointed King's Counsel in 1950, the third female KC in England after Rose Heilbron and Helena Normanton took silk the previous year. She was Assistant Recorder of Birmingham from 1953 to 1961, when she served as Chairman of the Mental Health Tribunals in 1960 and Commissioner of the Crown at Manchester in 1961. From late 1961 until 1962, she was Recorder of Derby.

In 1962, she was appointed as the first female judge in the County Court. Three years later, she became the first woman to sit in the High Court, assigned to the Probate, Divorce and Admiralty Division, and was appointed a Dame Commander of the Most Excellent Order of the British Empire, corresponding to the customary knighthood received on appointment by male High Court judges. She was also made a bencher of the Inner Temple in 1966, becoming the first female bencher of any Inn of Court.

From 1971 to 1973, she chaired a committee that investigated the operation of the Abortion Act and wrote the majority of the first volume of the report.

== Retirement ==
Her husband became legal adviser to the British Council and died in 1975. Lane retired in 1979 and moved to Winchester. Her High Court robes were passed to Margaret Booth who was appointed the same year, and subsequently worn by Brenda Hale and Jill Black. She continued to sit on the Court of Appeal from time to time and became an honorary member of the Western Circuit. She became an honorary fellow of Newnham College, Cambridge, in 1986. She wrote an autobiography, Hear the Other Side, which was published in 1985.

She died in Winchester on 17 June 1988, aged 82.
