= Rose Heilbron =

British barrister and judge (1914–2005)

Dame Rose Heilbron DBE
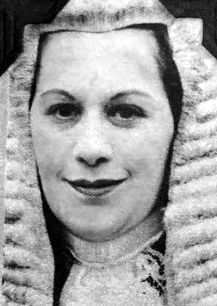
- Heilbron in April 1949

Judge of the High Court
- In office 1974–1988

Personal details
- Born: 19 August 1914 Liverpool, England
- Died: 8 December 2005 (aged 91) Islington, England
- Spouse: Nathaniel Burstein
- Education: The Belvedere School; University of Liverpool
- Occupation: Lawyer and judge
- Known for: Many firsts in UK legal history

Dame Rose Heilbron, DBE (19 August 1914 – 8 December 2005) was a British barrister who served later as a High Court judge. Her career included many "firsts" for a woman – she was the first woman to achieve a first class honours degree in law at the University of Liverpool, the first woman to win a scholarship to Gray's Inn, one of the first two women to be appointed King's Counsel in England, the first woman to lead in a murder case, the first woman recorder, the first woman judge to sit at the Old Bailey, and the first woman treasurer of Gray's Inn. She was also the second woman to be appointed a High Court judge, after Elizabeth Lane.

== Early life ==
Heilbron was born in Liverpool on 19 August 1914, the daughter of Jewish hotelier Max Heilbron. He assisted Jews who wanted to emigrate to the United States. She attended The Belvedere School and Liverpool University, where she became one of the first two women to gain a first class honours degree in law, in 1935. She was awarded the Lord Justice Holker scholarship at Gray's Inn in 1936, and she became one of only two women to hold a master of laws degree in 1937. Two years later she was called to the bar, and joined the Northern Circuit in 1940.

== Career ==
Heilbron practised mainly in personal injury and criminal law. Her rapid rise may have been aided by the fact that so many men were in the armed forces in the Second World War during her first six years as a barrister.

She was junior counsel for the West Indian cricketer Learie Constantine in his case in 1944, Constantine v Imperial Hotels, after he was turned away from a hotel due to his skin colour. In 1946, in Adams v Naylor, she represented two boys injured in a minefield on the beach between Crosby and Southport in a claim against an army officer; the unsuccessful appeal to the House of Lords contributed to the Crown Proceedings Act 1947.

By 1946, Heilbron had appeared in ten murder trials, and in 1949, just a few months after the birth of her daughter, she was one of the first two female King's Counsel at the English Bar (the other was Helena Normanton). Aged 34, she was the youngest KC since Thomas Erskine in 1783 when he was aged 33. She became something of a household name, especially in her home city, when, in 1949–50, she became the first woman to lead in a murder case, when she defended the gangster George Kelly, accused of shooting dead the deputy manager of the Cameo Cinema in Liverpool, which became known as the "Cameo murder". He reportedly said that he was not "having a Judy defend [him]", but he later praised her for her painstaking defence, which led to her being named the Daily Mirror's "Woman of the Year". She was unable to save Kelly from the gallows, but the Court of Appeal quashed his conviction as unsafe in 2003.

Heilbron's successes in the first half of the 1950s included the defence of four men accused of hanging a boy during a burglary, in which she was able to show that the death had been an accident; and the defence of Louis Bloom, a solicitor from Hartlepool who was accused of murdering his mistress in his office, but was found guilty of manslaughter. However, in 1953 she was unable to save John Todd from the gallows for the murder of a shopkeeper in Aintree.

She led in several other important cases, including Ormrod v Crosville Motor Services on vicarious liability in 1953, and Sweet v Parsley on the presumption of a requirement for mens rea in criminal offences in 1970.

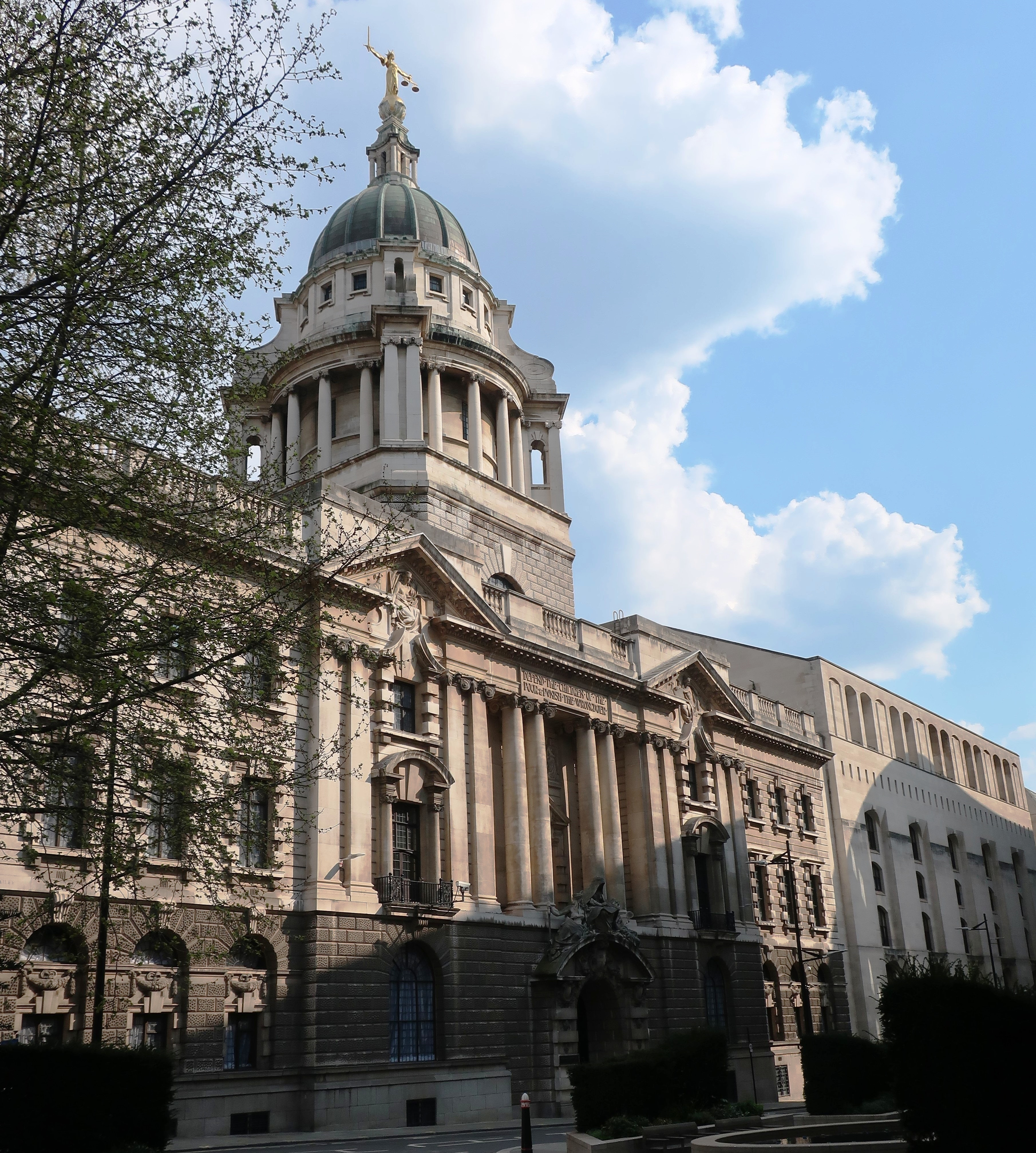
The Old Bailey

Heilbron was appointed as Recorder for Burnley in November 1956, the first appointment of a woman as Recorder, although not the first time one had sat. (Sybil Campbell was appointed a metropolitan stipendiary magistrate in 1945, and Dorothy Knight Dix was the first woman to preside at a jury trial in 1946, as deputy recorder of Deal). In 1957, she was the first woman to sit as a Commissioner of Assize. Elizabeth Lane was appointed the first female judge in the County Court in 1962 and of the High Court in 1965, but Heilbron was appointed as the first female judge to sit at the Old Bailey on 4 January 1972. She became leader of the Northern Circuit in 1973, and then followed Lane as the second woman High Court judge in 1974. Despite her background in criminal cases, which would have naturally suited her to the Queen's Bench Division, she was assigned to the Family Division, and created a DBE. She took charge of many criminal cases while presiding judge of the Northern Circuit (the first woman Presiding Judge of any Circuit) from 1979 to 1982.

In 1975, the Home Secretary, Roy Jenkins, appointed Heilbron to chair a committee to consider reform of rape laws. The committee's subsequent report recommended that the identity of rape complainants should be kept secret, and that the defence should be limited in its ability to cross-examine the complainant about their sexual history in an effort to attack their character. In 1976, she was made an honorary fellow of Lady Margaret Hall, Oxford.

She became a bencher at Gray's Inn in 1968, and was the first woman to head one of the four Inns of Court when she became its treasurer in 1985. She retired from judicial office in 1988.

== Personal life ==
Heilbron's hobbies included golf and walking, and she was a keen member of Soroptimist International, the worldwide organisation for women in management and the professions, working to advance human rights and the status of women. She was an Honorary Colonel of the East Lancashire Battalion of the WRAC. It was reported that she was the first woman in Liverpool to wear a calf-length evening dress.

In 1945, she married the Dublin-born general practitioner, Nathaniel Burstein (1905–2010). He became a consultant at a Liverpool hospital, and there is little doubt that the availability of medical knowledge was a great help to her in some cases. Her daughter, Hilary, was born in January 1949; Hilary also became a barrister and was in 1987 appointed a QC, the 29th woman so honoured.

== Death ==
Heilbron and her husband had moved from Liverpool to London when she was appointed a High Court judge. She died in a nursing home in Islington, of pneumonia and cerebrovascular ischaemia. A biography of Heilbron, by her daughter Hilary Heilbron, QC, was published in 2012.

== Arms ==
Coat of arms of Rose Heilbron

Notes
Displayed on a painted panel at Gray's Inn.
Escutcheon
Azure two rods of Aesculapius in saltire Or between four towers in cross Argent enflamed Proper (Burstein) an inescutcheon of pretence Argent on a well Gules masoned Or between eight roses Gules barbed and seeded proper a Liver bird also Proper (Heilbron).
