= Josephine Gordon Stuart =

Scottish legal graduate

- Born: November 1883; Edinburgh, Scotland, U.K.
- Died: 1 October 1955 (age 71)
- Education: University of Edinburgh School of Law (1909)

Josephine Gordon Stuart (November 1883 – 1 October 1955) was a pioneering figure in Scotland's legal history. Alongside Eveline MacLaren, she achieved the distinction of becoming one of Scotland's first two female law graduates by obtaining an LLB from the University of Edinburgh School of Law in 1909.

== Biography ==
Stuart was born in Edinburgh, the daughter of Joseph Gordon Stuart and Moncrieffe Leitch Stuart. Her father was a solicitor from Stuart & Stuart WS. Her sister Euphemia earned a medical degree in 1904.

Stuart was president of the Woman's Student Union at the University of Edinburgh in 1906, and earned a master of arts degree in 1907. She graduated from law school in a ceremony at McEwan Hall in April 1909, along with Eveline MacLaren. They were the first two women to earn law degrees from the University of Edinburgh School of Law. However, neither Stuart nor Maclaren was ever admitted to the practice of law.

Stuart married solicitor James Douglas Cameron in 1915, and had two sons, born in 1919 and 1927. Her brother, son and grandson all entered the legal profession. Her older son died in World War II, while serving in the Royal Air Force. She died in 1955, at the age of 71.
