= Bermuda Bar Association =

- Type: Legal Society
- Headquarters: Bermuda
- Location: Bermuda
- Website: bermudabar.org

The Bermuda Bar Association is a bar association of lawyers and responsible for the governing and discipline of the Bermuda legal profession.

== See also ==
- Commonwealth Lawyers Association (CLA)
