= Eveline MacLaren =

Eveline MacLaren (1883–1955) was one of Scotland's first women to complete her legal studies and graduate from the Faculty of Law at the University of Edinburgh in 1909 alongside Josephine Gordon Stuart. The Faculty of Law is now known as the Edinburgh Law School.

The graduation ceremony was held on 2 April 1909 in McEwan Hall.

At the time of graduation, MacLaren was not allowed to enter the legal profession and never became a full lawyer. Eveline did however carry out business under the name 'Duncan Smith & MacLaren' at 62 Frederick Street, Edinburgh.
