= Helena Normanton =

British barrister and activist (1882–1957)

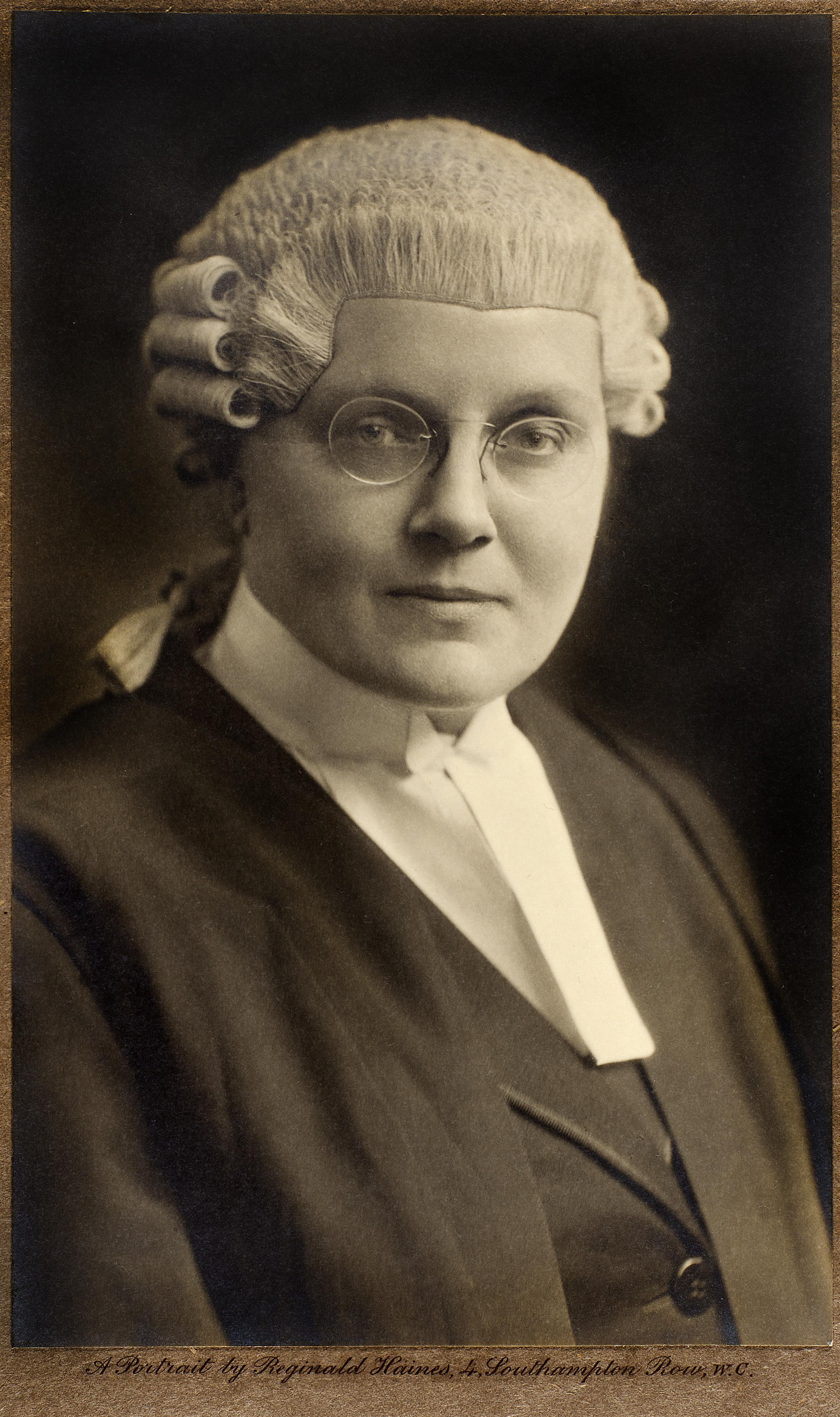
- Born: Helena Florence Normanton; 14 December 1882; East London, England
- Died: 14 October 1957 (aged 74); Sydenham, London, England
- Education: University of London
- Known for: One of the first female barristers, campaigner for women's rights, pioneer of divorce reform, and the first married woman to hold a British passport in her own name, after she declined to take on her husband's surname.

Helena Florence Normanton, QC (14 December 1882 – 14 October 1957) was the first female barrister in the United Kingdom. In November 1922, she was the second woman to be called to the Bar of England and Wales, following the example set by Ivy Williams in May 1922. When she married, she kept her surname and in 1924, she was the first British married woman to have a passport in the name she was born with. In October 2021, Normanton was honoured by the installation of an English Heritage blue plaque at her London home in Mecklenburgh Square.

== Early life and education ==
Normanton was born in East London to Jane Amelia (née Marshall) and piano maker William Alexander Normanton. In 1886, when she was just four years old, her father was found dead in a railway tunnel. Her mother, who may already have been separated from her father, a stigmatised position in those days, brought up Helena and her younger sister Ethel alone – letting rooms in the family home in Woolwich to wives of officers, before moving to Brighton to run a grocery and later a boarding house.

In 1896, Normanton won a scholarship to the York Place Science School in Brighton, now known as Varndean School, where she did well, becoming a pupil teacher by the time she left in July 1900. Following her mother's death, she became responsible for supporting her sister and helped to run the family's boarding-house before studying teacher training at Edge Hill College, Liverpool between 1903 and 1905. At one point she was head girl and was told by the Principal to ask the students to give up the cost of cake with their tea one Wednesday to donate the money to the Benevolent Fund. The students suggested that they want to keep the cake and instead give up the cost of Wednesday dinner, that was infamous for including badly cooked fish and dessert. Normanton reported this to the Principal, Sarah Hale resulting in improvement to the cooking of Wednesday dinner.

She also read modern history at the University of London as an external student, graduating with first class honours, obtained a Scottish Secondary Teachers' Diploma, and held a diploma in French language, literature, and history from Dijon University. She lectured in history at Glasgow University and London University and began to speak and write about feminist issues. She worked as a tutor to the sons of the Baron de Forest, a Liberal MP. She spoke at meetings of the Women's Freedom League and supported the Indian National Congress.

== Legal career ==
Normanton describes the moment she decided to become a barrister in her book, Everyday Law for Woman. She says that as a twelve-year-old girl, she was visiting a solicitor's office with her mother, who was unable to understand the solicitor's advice. Normanton recognised this situation as a form of sex discrimination and wished to help all women gain access to the law, which at the time was a profession only open to men.

In the book, Normanton reflects: "I still do not like to see women getting the worst end of any deal for lack of a little elementary legal knowledge which is the most common form amongst men".

Normanton held ambitions to become a barrister from a young age. An application to become a student at Middle Temple in 1918 was refused, and she lodged a petition with the House of Lords. In April 1919, Normanton proposed a motion at a Union Society debate in the Old Hall of Lincoln's Inn that the British legal profession should open to women. She was supported by Cornelia Sorabji, who gave a speech with examples from her legal work in India, which Normanton credited with helping to win a majority and even later helping to encourage support for the Sex Disqualification (Removal) Bill.

Normanton reapplied on 24 December 1919, within hours of the Sex Disqualification (Removal) Act 1919 coming into force, and was admitted to the Middle Temple.

She was the second woman to be called to the bar on 17 November 1922, shortly after Ivy Williams. She was the first woman to obtain a divorce for her client, the first woman to lead the prosecution in a murder trial, and the first woman to conduct a trial in America and to appear at the High Court and the Old Bailey. In 1949, along with Rose Heilbron, she was one of the first two women King's Counsel at the English Bar.

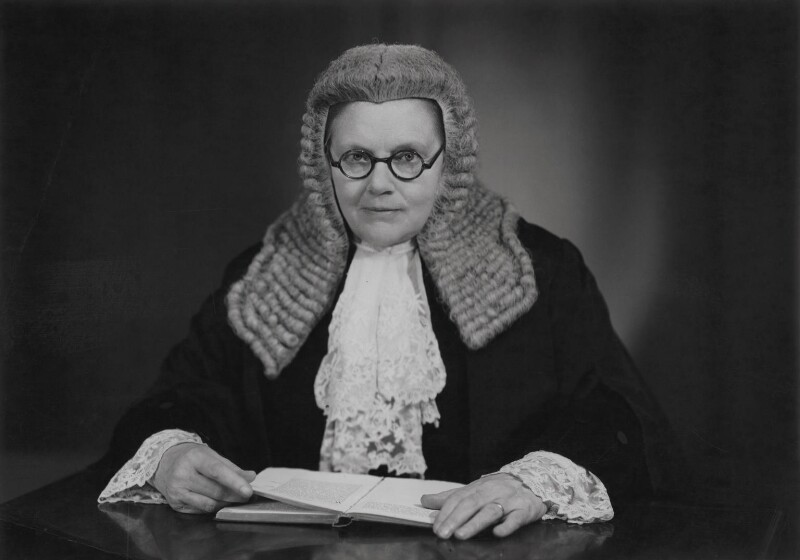
Photograph of Helena Normanton taken in 1950

== Feminism ==
Normanton was a campaigner for women's rights and women's suffrage, and believing that men and women should keep their money and property separately. Normanton kept her name after she married in 1921. In 1924, she became the first married British woman to be issued a passport in her maiden name.

In July 1929, ten years after the passing of the Sex Disqualification (Removal) Act 1919, Normanton spoke at the Women's Engineering Society's seventh Annual Conference, alongside Professor Winifred Cullis, the first woman to hold a professorial chair at a medical school, and architect Edna Mosley. In her speech, Normanton noted that there were

nearly a hundred women solicitors in this country and most of them have brilliant qualifications; she did not believe in any boycott of men in professions, but the women ought at least to be brought into the sphere of action. There was a general muddle at present in regard to the position of women...They might become engineers but not ministers of the Church; they might not enter the sacred portals of the Stock Exchange nor the House of Lords; they could become a Cabinet Minister but not an Ambassador. While any woman was held back from the position to which her talents drew her, the whole of womanhood was lowered.

She acted as the Honorary Legal Adviser for the Women's Engineering Society from 1936 until 1954, succeeding Theodora Llewelyn Davies in the role.

She campaigned for divorce reform, and was president of the Married Women's Association until 1952, when the other officials resigned over her memorandum of evidence to the Royal Commission on Divorce, which they regarded as 'anti-man'. Normanton formed a breakaway body, the Council of Married Women.

She founded the Magna Carta Society. She was a pacifist throughout her life and was later a supporter of CND, demonstrating against the nuclear bomb after the Second World War.

== Personal life ==
Normanton was married to Gavin Bowman Watson Clark, an accountant. They lived in London.

Normanton died in Sydenham, London on 14 October 1957 and, after cremation, was buried with her husband in Ovingdean churchyard, Sussex.

== Legacy ==
In 1957, Normanton was the first person to leave a legacy donation to the University of Sussex (which opened in 1961), and is recognised as a founding funder. She wrote that "I make this gift in gratitude for all that Brighton did to educate me when I was left an orphan." In 2015, the Helena Normanton Society was formed in her honour at the University of Sussex, and The Helena Normanton Doctoral Fellowship was launched there in 2017.

The archives of Helena Normanton are held at The Women's Library at the Library of The London School of Economics, ref 7HLN

In February 2019, 218 Strand Chambers rebranded as Normanton Chambers in her honour. This is the first instance of a barristers' chambers being named after a woman.

In 2020 barrister Karlia Lykourgou set up the first legal outfitter dedicated to offering courtwear for women, as much of the existing provision was impractical and uncomfortable. She named it Ivy & Normanton, in honour of Ivy Williams, the first woman to be called to the Bar in May 1922, and Helena Normanton.

In April 2021 English Heritage announced that Normanton was one of six women whom they were honouring with a Blue plaque, marking where she lived from 1919 to 1931 during the early part of her legal career. Normanton's nomination was made by women barristers at Doughty Street Chambers. The plaque was unveiled by Brenda Hale, the first female head of the Supreme Court on the wall of 22 Mecklenburgh Square in October 2021.

In June 2022, Normanton was honoured with a blue plaque at 4 Clifton Place, Brighton where she lived as a teenager in the 1890s, following a campaign by teenage Brighton twins, after they learned of Normanton in a school project.

== Works ==
- Sex Differentiation in Salary, 1915
- India in England, 1915
- Oliver Quendon's First Case, 1927 (a romantic detective novel published under the pseudonym Cowdray Browne)
- The Trial of Norman Thorne : the Crowborough chicken farm murder, 1929
- Trial of Alfred Arthur Rouse, 1931
- Everyday Law for Women, 1932
- The Trial of Mrs. Duncan, 1945

== See also ==
- First women lawyers around the world
