= 2025 Manchester synagogue attack =

Terrorist attack in England

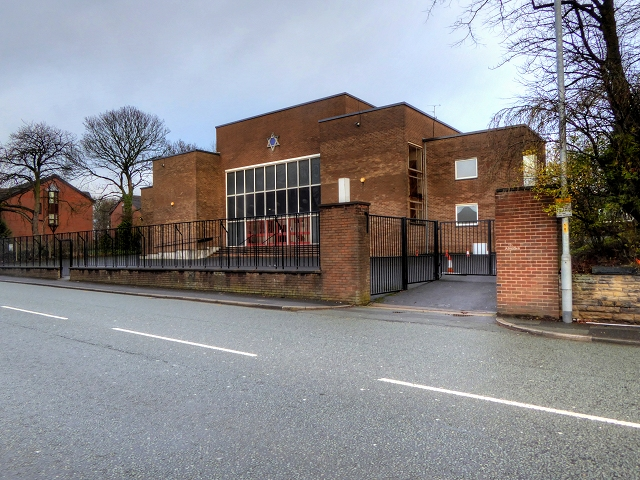
- The Heaton Park Hebrew Congregation, where the attack occurred, pictured in October 2015
- Location: 53°31′12″N 2°14′55″W; Heaton Park Hebrew Congregation, Higher Crumpsall, Manchester, England
- Date: 2 October 2025; 9:31 (BST (UTC+01:00))
- Attack type: Car attack; knife attack
- Weapons: Kia Picanto; Knife
- Deaths: 3 (Adrian Daulby and Melvin Cravitz. Shooter al-Shamie, killed by police)
- Injuries: 3 (2 injured by al-Shamie, 1 injured by police)
- Assailant: Jihad al-Shamie
- Motive: Antisemitism; Islamic State ideology

On 2 October 2025, during the Jewish holiday of Yom Kippur, a man drove a black Kia Picanto into pedestrians before stabbing worshippers at the Heaton Park Hebrew Congregation, a synagogue in Higher Crumpsall, a northern suburb of the city of Manchester in North West England.

Two people were killed in the incident, Adrian Daulby, aged 53 and Melvin Cravitz, aged 66. One worshipper was shot dead by police. Three other people were injured and treated in hospital; one was hit by the car, one had a stab wound and the third was wounded by police gunfire.

The attacker, Jihad al-Shamie, was a 35-year-old British citizen born in Syria who lived nearby in Prestwich. He was also shot dead by the police.

== Background ==
Yom Kippur is the holiest day of the Jewish calendar, a day centred around atonement and repentance, with full fasting and asceticism accompanied by extended prayer services and the confession of sins.

British Jews have raised concerns about increased vandalism at synagogues and antisemitic comments online and in person, latterly due to the Gaza war, ongoing since 2023. These have also been positioned as part of an ongoing wave of antisemitism in Britain that was rising even before the war began. Jewish security groups, including Community Security Trust, issued warnings earlier in the summer for Jewish people to "be vigilant and follow the strict security measures that are in place at communal buildings, events and areas" such as locking all doors when not in use, conducting security sweeps, and avoiding congregating outside communal buildings.

== Incident ==
Worshippers had gathered at the synagogue for a Yom Kippur service, which had begun at 9 am, 2 October 2025. Witnesses reported that they had seen a man, later identified as the attacker, Jihad al-Shamie, "acting suspiciously" outside the synagogue approximately 15 minutes prior to the attack. He left after being confronted by security. He was spotted by a doorbell camera walking towards his home at 9:22 am, with the same camera spotting a vehicle, matching that used by al-Shamie during the attack, driving towards the Heaton Park Hebrew Congregation synagogue in Crumpsall four minutes later.

Police were called to the synagogue at 9:31 am BST, after callers reported that a driver had driven into pedestrians and begun stabbing people. Residents later reported seeing a man with a knife jump out of a moving car that had been driven recklessly. He began stabbing people; others saw people on the ground bleeding. It was later confirmed at an inquest that, after al-Shamie had driven into a security guard and crashed into an exterior metal gate and wall at approximately 9:30 am, narrowly missing 66-year-old Melvin Cravitz, he exited his vehicle and immediately stabbed Cravitz, making stabbing motions towards his upper torso, neck and head.

Firearms officers were deployed at 9:34 am, while a major incident was declared by Greater Manchester Police three minutes later; Operation Plato was also declared at that time, a protocol used in response to suspected terror attacks. The attacker himself called 999 and pledged allegiance to Islamic State. Eyewitnesses inside the synagogue praised rabbi Daniel Walker for protecting congregants by locking them inside the synagogue and keeping the attacker out, before moving them to safety. According to a witness inside the synagogue, the attacker banged his knife on the glass as he tried to get in, shouting "this is what they get for killing our children".

Shots were fired by firearms officers at 9:38 am, killing al-Shamie as he "ran towards them aggressively while carrying a knife and wearing what clearly presented as a suicide belt". 53-year old Adrian Daulby, a worshipper, was also shot in the chest and killed by police by either "a single stray or possibl[y] deflected bullet" while he was blocking the synagogue doors. He was pronounced dead at the synagogue at 10:15 am. Paramedics arrived at 9:41 am and treated four members of the public for injuries caused by the vehicle and stab wounds. Four people were seriously injured in the attack and were taken to hospital; Melvin Cravitz, who was pronounced dead later that morning, Andrew Franks, who was also stabbed by al-Shamie, Bernard Agyemang, and Yoni Finlay, who was wounded by police gunfire, believed to have also been blocking the synagogue doors.

Around noon, a bomb disposal unit was deployed to the scene because police believed the attacker was wearing a suicide belt. Police said that they were unable to confirm whether the attacker was dead until the investigation concluded. Investigators would later state the device was "found to be not viable". At 1:23 pm, a loud controlled explosion was reported, which was later confirmed to be from the police gaining access to the attacker's car. Police presence was increased at every synagogue in the Greater Manchester area in the immediate aftermath of the attack.

== Attacker ==
The attacker was identified as Jihad al-Shamie, a 35-year-old Syrian-born man who as a young child had migrated to the United Kingdom with his family from Homs, following his father who had already settled in England in the 1990s. He had naturalised as a British citizen in 2006 while still a minor. Al-Shamie grew up in Prestwich until around 2010, when the family moved to nearby Crumpsall. The Guardian reported that it appeared that Al-Shamie had Islamic marriages to three different women. Al-Shamie fathered two children with one of the wives, and lived in Prestwich with this wife, their children and his mother.

In 2025, al-Shamie was arrested on suspicion of an alleged rape earlier in the year. One of his wives, a Muslim convert, from whom he had initially hidden his other marriages and whose request for a divorce he had refused, reported to police after the attack that he had also raped her. She described al-Shamie as "controlling and abusive". Two women made further accusations after the attack, including one of his wives and a woman who claimed that he had groomed her after meeting each other on a Muslim dating site.

The mosque at which al-Shamie worshipped, Masjid Sunnah Nelson, was reported to the Charity Commission in November 2023 by the National Secular Society for divisive and antisemitic rhetoric. The mosque's imam, Abul Abbaas Naveed, had referred to Jews as "treacherous" in October 2023, and had taught that a husband has "the first and last word" in a household. Sunnah Nelson is associated with the Salafi movement.

At the time of the attack, al-Shamie resided in the Langley Crescent area of Prestwich, located 2 mi (3.2 km) from the synagogue. According to one of his neighbours, al-Shamie "didn't stand out" and never spoke about politics. He had not been a part of the Prevent counter-terrorism programme that tries to identify people at risk of being radicalised. Although al-Shamie was not known to counter-terrorism police, he had a criminal record with convictions for several minor offences, and at the time of his death was free on bail under investigation for rape. Police are also investigating if he was the author of a death threat sent to Conservative MP John Howell in 2012 after Howell expressed support for Israel.

Following the attacks, al-Shamie's father released a statement believed to have been made on behalf of the family denouncing the attacks. Work by investigative journalists uncovered social media posts where the father had previously expressed support for the Hamas-led attacks on IDF bases during the 7 October 2023 attacks and the 2024 Iranian air strikes on Israel. The posts were deleted after the reporting.

== Investigation ==
The national head of counter-terrorist policing announced the attack was being treated as a terrorist incident, and that three people other than the assailant have been arrested in two separate areas. Two men in their thirties in Crumpsall and a woman in her sixties in Prestwich were arrested on suspicion of the commission, preparation and instigation of acts of terrorism following the attack. Three more arrests occurred the following day, consisting of a man and two women aged from 18 to their mid-40s. On 3 October police were seeking to further detain all six people. On 5 October police were granted a further five days to question four people on suspicion of preparation for terrorist acts, two men aged 30 and 32 and two women aged 46 and 61. On 27 November, a 31-year-old man was arrested at Manchester Airport by police in connection with the attack.

In October 2025, investigators said they were "still trying to locate and examine all of the suspect's electronic devices, looking for clues as to what radicalised him" and are looking for "an Islamist motive but are looking for evidence to confirm or rebut that theory".

In August 2026, a man, who with al-Shamie had conducted reconnaissance of a military base, admitted to preparing acts of terror and was given a life sentence with a minimum term of 16 years.

Home Secretary Shabana Mahmood announced in October 2026 that a public inquiry would be initiated for the purposes of collecting additional information relevant to the incident, "including any sensitive national security material that could not otherwise be fully heard".

== Inquests ==
Full inquests for Melvin Cravitz, aged 66, and Adrian Daulby, 53, are due to be held before Alexia Durran, the Chief Coroner of England and Wales, at Manchester coroner's court.

In September 2026, a pre-inquest review took place, where it was stated that the government was seeking to withhold "potentially relevant security sensitive material held by MI5" and also material held by "counter-terrorism police”. The review was told that the inquest legal team were satisfied that the information was too sensitive to be revealed at the inquest even if redacted.

The Cravitz family lawyer said the family were concerned that such sensitive material should have become regarded as relevant following statements made by the Home Secretary to the House of Commons that Jihad al-Shamie "was not known to counter-terrorism police or the security services".

The Chief Coroner is considering whether to ask the government to convert the inquest into a statutory public inquiry which would allow the security sensitive material to be heard in private.

== Reactions ==
=== Political reaction ===
Prime Minister Keir Starmer returned from a European Political Community leaders' meeting in Copenhagen, Denmark, to chair a COBR emergency meeting. Starmer said at a press conference that the attacker targeted "Jews because they are Jews" and said that the United Kingdom "must defeat this rising hatred". He said that "extra police assets" would be deployed to synagogues across the country due to the attack. Home Secretary Shabana Mahmood echoed this, saying the government "will do whatever is required to keep our Jewish community safe." Mayor of London Sadiq Khan likewise announced there would be a "stepping up (of) patrols in Jewish communities and synagogues across London" by the Metropolitan Police. Mayor of Greater Manchester Andy Burnham commended the quick response of the Greater Manchester Police and raised concerns about the fear and sadness caused by the attack, saying that the city would not allow "division in our communities".

Mahmood urged the cancellation of pro-Palestinian marches after the terror attack, backing police calls to halt a major protest planned for Saturday in Trafalgar Square. Hours after the attack, clashes broke out between demonstrators and police outside Downing Street, while Mahmood separately denounced such protests as "un-British", "dishonourable", and "insensitive" to Jewish communities. Defend Our Juries defended its intention to go ahead with a protest against the proscription of Palestine Action on the Saturday following the attack, saying that conflating the actions of Israel with Jewish people around the world could fuel antisemitism.

Dave Rich, the head of policy at the Community Security Trust, founded to provide security to Britain's Jewish community, called the decision "remarkably self absorbed and insensitive".

King Charles III said he and Queen Camilla were "deeply shocked and saddened" and that their "thoughts and prayers are with all those affected by this appalling incident". The Prince and Princess of Wales also praised the swift actions of emergency services. Amnesty International UK expressed sadness over the events, calling it a "horrific act of violence that has taken the lives of two innocent people and injured many more".

=== Reaction from British Jews ===
British Jews expressed shock and concern over the attack, with Britain's chief rabbi Ephraim Mirvis highlighting the rise in antisemitism and that the attack was the result of the unchecked rise. British Christian and Muslim community leaders condemned the attack and offered prayers and support to the Jewish people in the UK. The deputy prime minister, David Lammy, was booed and barracked on 3 October when he addressed a vigil in Manchester.

=== Israeli reaction ===
Israeli Prime Minister Benjamin Netanyahu expressed sympathy, saying "Israel grieves with the Jewish community in the UK after the barbaric terror attack in Manchester", adding "as I warned at the UN: weakness in the face of terrorism only brings more terrorism. Only strength and unity can defeat it." Israeli Foreign Minister Gideon Sa'ar accused the British authorities of not doing enough to curb rising antisemitism in Britain, stating that "blatant and rampant antisemitic and anti-Israeli incitement" had become common.

=== Characterization as an antisemitic attack ===
Alan Rusbridger, writing in The Independent, opined: "The prime minister, Keir Starmer, was right to describe [al-Shamie's] actions as 'a terrorist attack to inflict fear. Attacking Jews because they are Jews.' It was, in other words, antisemitism". In a statement addressed to the House of Commons, Home Secretary Mahmood called the attack an "act of antisemitic terrorism ... that was carried out by a terrorist pledging his allegiance to the warped ideology of Islamism." In the House of Lords, the attack was labelled as an antisemitic act by the Deputy Home Secretary David Hanson and the Liberal Democrat politician Dee Doocey, among others. GMP Chief Constable Stephen Watson called it an "antisemitic terrorist atrocity".

Writing in Prospect magazine, the scholars Brendan McGeever, Ben Gidley, and David Feldman said that "hopefully we can all agree that what happened in Manchester was unambiguously antisemitic". Jay Michaelson wrote in MSNBC.com, "This attack was 100% antisemitic ... synagogues are not military targets, and British Jews ... are not soldiers ... Nor, as far as I'm aware, did the terrorist ask his victims what they thought of Zionism or the Netanyahu government. He ran into the crowd with his car and stabbed people because they were Jews." In The Independent, Howard Jacobson asked: "Can we agree now ... that an attack on a synagogue in Crumpsall, so far from Gaza, so innocent of colonial ambition, is as pure an expression of Jew-hatred as Jew-hatred gets?"

Greater Manchester Police stated that antisemitic hate crime tripled in the three weeks following the attack. The Heaton Park Synagogue rabbi Daniel Walker said that he received a death threat a few months before the attack, "and there was a message left on my machine telling me to get out of Manchester, [that] they don't like my type around here, [that] I support genocide.'" The rabbi recalled, "When our attacker stood on the steps looking at us through the window, he shouted, 'They are killing our kids'". Walker reflected on "the ridiculousness of suggesting that two of the nicest people you are ever going to meet would ever harm a fly, let alone kill anyone's kids ... But this accusation is on every Jew in the world, that we are somehow collectively killing kids."

=== Rhetoric at perpetrator's mosque ===
The Daily Telegraph reported that Abul Abbaas Naveed in October 2023, the imam of al-Shamie's mosque, Masjid Sunnah Nelson, made derogatory remarks about Jewish people, quoting a hadith regarding Zaynab bint Al-Harith that he said "shows us the traits of the Yahud [Jews], how treacherous they are and how much they betray and oppress people". Naveed denied responsibility for al-Shamie's radicalisation, saying that there was "nothing in the teachings itself" that would have radicalised him. Naveed had also used inflammatory rhetoric about women and non-Muslims.

The National Secular Society, which in 2023 reported the charity behind Masjid Sunnah Nelson to the Charity Commission for extremist rhetoric, along with over 40 other Islamic charities, said that "charities promoting divisive or extremist rhetoric under the guise of 'advancing religion' serve no public benefit", and called on the government to "reform charity law to ensure that only organisations which genuinely advance the public good – rather than fuel division or violence – are afforded charitable privileges". The Charity Commission responded saying that it had given "guidance" to the mosque about not using "inflammatory language". The Campaign Against Antisemitism said that regulators must take stronger action to ensure that "radical extremism in the name of religion will no longer be tolerated".

== Aftermath ==
A man later identified as Markel Ible called the Sinai Synagogue in Roundhay, Leeds, on 6 October, claiming to have planted a bomb at the synagogue that would explode the following day. He was charged by police on 7 October and pleaded guilty the following day to calling in a fake bomb threat. He was sentenced to ten months imprisonment on 30 October 2025.

On 4 October, a previously planned pro-Palestinian protest was held in north Manchester, with over 100 in attendance. On 16 October, the synagogue reopened two weeks after the attack. On 17 October, a security guard injured in the incident when he was struck by the car being driven by al-Shamie was discharged from hospital.

On 21 October, Charles III visited Manchester to meet with survivors and families of the victims.

== Memorial service ==
On 1 September 2026, 800 people participated in a memorial service to mark a year since the car ramming attack and the murder of Cravitz and Daulby. Government officials including Secretary of State for Communities, Housing and Local Government Angela Rayner, Minister for Faith Flo Eshalomi, Greater Manchester Mayor Bev Craig, Chief Rabbi Sir Ephraim Mirvis, and Greater Manchester Police Chief Constable Sir Stephen Watson also participated.

A statement from Charles III was read in which he said ‘My wife and I hold all those whose lives were so tragically disrupted by that terrible day most closely in our thoughts and prayers. Hatred can never prevail over our shared humanity’.

== See also ==
- CONTEST – the UK's counter-terrorism strategy
- History of the Jews in Manchester
- List of attacks on Jewish institutions
- Manchester Arena bombing
- Halle synagogue shooting – Antisemitic and far-right attack in Germany, also occurred during Yom Kippur
- Peacehaven mosque arson – occurred two days later
- Operation Temperer – British government military plan
- Murder of Michael Kahan
