= Edge Hill University =

English public university

- Coat of arms Edge Hill University
- Former name: Edge Hill College (1885–1996) Edge Hill Training College (1885–1996) Edge Hill University College (1996–2006) Edge Hill College of Higher Education (1996–2006)
- Motto: Latin: In Scientia Opportunitas
- Motto in English: In knowledge there is opportunity
- Type: Public
- Established: 1885 – teacher training college 2006 – university status
- Affiliations: Universities UK
- Chancellor: Dawn Airey
- Vice-Chancellor: Nick Braisby (Interim)
- Students: 13,330 (2024/25)
- Undergraduates: 9,790 (2024/25)
- Postgraduates: 3,540 (2024/25)
- Location: Ormskirk, Lancashire, England; 53°33′36″N 2°52′24″W
- Campus: Rural
Colours
Green, Gold and Purple
- Website: edgehill.ac.uk

Edge Hill University is a campus-based public university in Ormskirk, Lancashire, England. The university, which originally opened in 1885 as Edge Hill College, was the first non-denominational teacher training college for women in England, before admitting its first male students in 1959. In 2005, Edge Hill was granted Taught Degree Awarding Powers by the Privy Council and became Edge Hill University on 18 May 2006.

The university has three faculties: Arts and Sciences, Education, and Health, Social Care and Medicine; these teach at both undergraduate and postgraduate levels.

== History ==
Edge Hill College opened on 24 January 1885 on Durning Road, Edge Hill, Liverpool, by a group of seven Liverpool businessmen and philanthropists. It was named after the district in which it was sited, and was the first non-denominational teacher training college for women in England. By 1892, Edge Hill was one of only two colleges in England combining teacher training and degree course study. As student numbers increased, Edge Hill quickly outgrew its surroundings. The institution was handed over to the Lancashire Education Committee, with the foundation stone for the present Ormskirk campus laid on 26 October 1931 by J.T. Travis-Clegg, Chairman of Lancashire County Council. The main buildings consisted of a main education block, four halls of residence (named Stanley, Clough, Lady Margaret and John Dalton), an Assembly Hall, a library, craft room, gymnasium, lecture theatres, classrooms and a music room.

Between 1939 and 1946, during the Second World War, the college was evacuated to Bingley in Yorkshire, and the Ormskirk site was requisitioned for use by the military and became Polish Military Hospital No. 4.

The Durning Road premises were destroyed in a bombing raid on 17 November 1940, during the Liverpool Blitz, which killed 166 people.

Edge Hill became a mixed college, admitting its first male students in October 1959, when it had about 500 students in total. In 1963 the college recorded having 660 students and 59 members of staff.

The institution has since expanded, with further developments at Ormskirk and the absorption of the former Sefton School of Health Studies.

In 2005, Edge Hill was granted Taught Degree Awarding Powers by the Privy Council. On 18 May 2006 the institution became Edge Hill University and in August 2008 the university was granted the power to award research degrees.

== Campus ==
Edge Hill University is based on a 160-acre (650,000 m^{2}) campus in Ormskirk, the administrative centre of West Lancashire. It is midway between Liverpool and the county town of Preston.

The university used to operate from the Woodlands campus based in Chorley, central Lancashire, where it offered continuing professional development programmes and part-time study. However, in recent years operations have been centralised back to the main University campus.

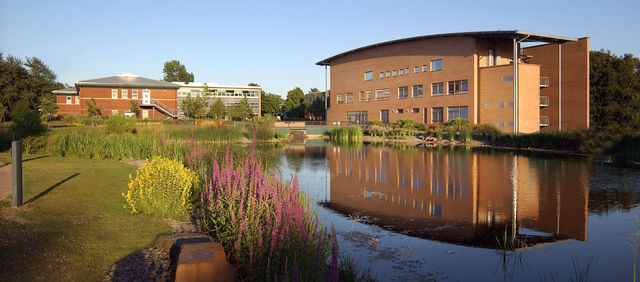
The Faculty of Education Piazza (left), and the Clinical Skills and Simulation Centre (right)

Most of the university's subjects and departments are based in specialist buildings developed since the 1990s: Faculty of Education Piazza & Lakeside, Faculty of Health, Social Care and Medicine, Clinical Skills and Simulation Centre, Business School, BioSciences, GeoSciences, LifeSciences, Creative Edge (Media and Social Sciences), The Arts Centre, and the Wilson Centre (Sport and Physical Activity). The Tech Hub was opened in 2016 by entrepreneur Sir Robin Saxby.

The university also operates a campus in Manchester city centre in the St. James Buildings, mainly for medical science courses.

=== The Student Hub ===
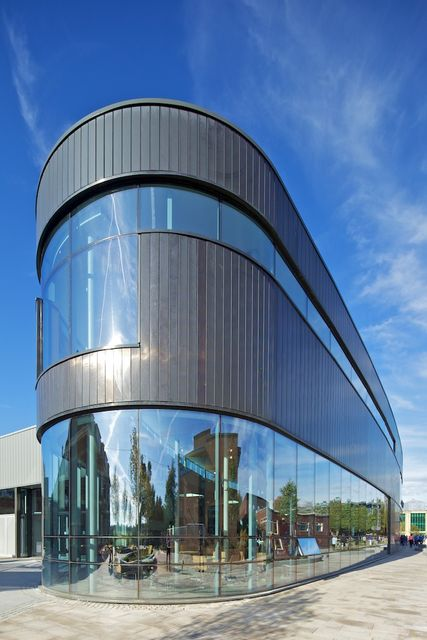
The Hub

This building opened in 2011 as a central student area, containing retail and catering outlets and IT facilities, as well as providing new accommodation for the Edge Hill Students' Union. It was formally opened by Sophie, Countess of Wessex on 15 October 2012.

=== Sports Centre ===
The current indoor and outdoor sports complex was opened in 2015 by Olympic heptathlete Katarina Johnson-Thompson.

=== Arts Centre ===
The Arts Centre houses the university's Performing Arts Department and the Rose and Studio Theatres. The Arts Centre was officially opened by British screenwriter and writer of the London 2012 Summer Olympics opening ceremony Frank Cottrell Boyce who is an Honorary Doctor of Literature at the university. The Arts Centre includes a 234-seat professional theatre (The Rose Theatre) and a 140-seat Studio Theatre.

=== Catalyst ===
Catalyst serves as the Students' library on the Ormskirk campus, as well as the student services and information centre. The former library, which opened in the 1990s (and is now the law and psychology building), was replaced with a new purpose-built multi-storey building, located on the old running track, adjacent to the Wilson Centre, and equidistant between the Student Hub and Creative Edge buildings, as part of a £36 million development. The £26 million building houses a study space that is 8,000 square metres, which is 50% larger than the old Library building. The development began in December 2016, when the old racing track was dug up. Catalyst opened on 9 July 2018. The Catalyst was officially opened in 2019 by Anne, The Princess Royal.

=== Halls of Residence ===
The original Halls of Residence were 'named Stanley, Clough, Lady Margaret and John Dalton "in honour" of the Derby Family' and "of three individuals famous in the history of Lancashire and of Education" (Anne Jemima Clough was a pioneer of higher education for women, having founded Newnham College, Cambridge)'

Back Halls, opened in 1963 by Princess Margaret, are named after Lady Openshaw, Katherine Fletcher (Chairs of Governors), EM Butterworth, Margaret Bain (Principals) and Eleanor Rathbone, a noted social reformer. Lancashire Hall was demolished in 1999 to make way for the Wilson Centre (Edge Hill Sport), but was originally built to house male students. Forest Court (Ash, Beech, Cedar, Elm, Holly, Larch, Maple, Oak, Rowan and Willow) added 300 bedrooms in the early 1990s.

More recent Halls include Founders Court, named after the institution's founders Crosfield (William Crosfield); McDairmid (S. McDairmid); Matheson (Thomas Matheson); Smith (Samuel Smith (1836–1906)), Balfour (Alexander Balfour); Sinclair (WP Sinclair); and Sarah Yelf (the first Principal); and Graduates Court, named after alumni: Ainsworth (Joe Ainsworth), Annakin (Ethel Annakin), Maconie (Stuart Maconie), Normanton (Helena Normanton) and Pryce (Jonathan Pryce).

In 2012, Chancellors Court was opened, adding Halls named after individuals associated with the institution including Chairs of the Board of Governors: Blake, Booth, Bradshaw, Fulton, Millner, Pinfold, Tomkins, and Wilson as well as Byron (Tanya Byron, the first Chancellor of the university), and Williams (politician Shirley Williams). Additional Halls added in 2013 are, in Chancellors Court: Binns (Sir Arthur Lennon Binns), Boyce (J.S.B Boyce), Lord (Sir Percy Lord), and Meadon (Sir Percival Edward Meadon); and in Founders Court: Dewhurst (M. K. Dewhurst), Fenemore (Mildred Fenemore), Feuchsel (Harriet D Feuchsel) and Holt (George Holt (merchant)).

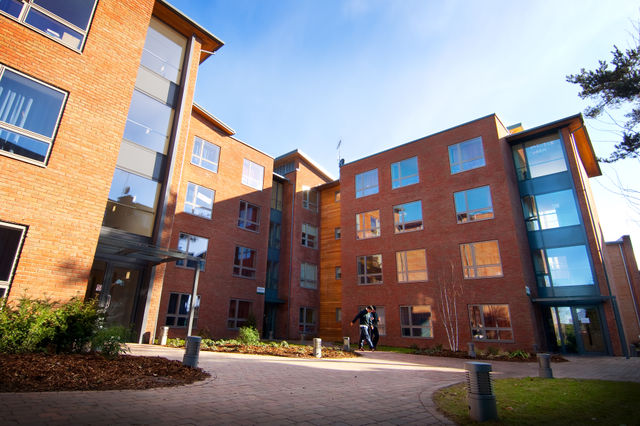
Founders' Court

Chancellors South, an additional 246 accommodation units to complete the Chancellors Court blocks on the Eastern side of the campus, was completed in summer 2014. The Halls are named after individuals associated with the institution including Laverty (Bernard Laverty, Pro-Chancellor and chair of the Edge Hill University Board of Governors since 2014, Chartered Accountant and Director of Lancashire textile company David Whitehead & Sons Limited), Jenkins (Miss JA Jenkins, Vice-Principal of Edge Hill from 1906 and Acting Principal from 1909 to 1910), Millins (Mr PKC 'Ken' Millins was the first male Principal of Edge Hill, leading the institution between 1964 and 1979 and was awarded an Honorary Doctorate in 2010), Aitken (Sir James Aitken served on the Education Committee of Lancashire County Council from 1921 to 1948, and was chair of the council from 1946 to 1948) and Welch (John Welch was chair of the Education Committee of Lancashire County Council between 1955 and 1958).

Palatine Court Halls are named after prominent individuals associated with the historic Lancashire County Palatine: Carrington (artist Leonora Carrington), Glazebrook (physicist Richard Glazebrook), Pankhurst (campaigner for women's suffrage Emmeline Pankhurst), Roscoe (abolitionist and historian William Roscoe), Lowry (artist L. S. Lowry), Peel (Prime Minister and architect of the modern police force Robert Peel) and Wilkinson (politician, sometime Minister for Education Ellen Wilkinson).

Woodland Court Halls are named in alphabetical order starting from Block A to Block Y. Woodland Court is exclusively offered to senior undergraduate students and is not available to first year undergraduate students. Woodland Court differs from other accommodation in that it is laid out in a townhouse format, with different parts of the accommodation split over multiple floors, however it is otherwise identical to other halls of residence.

In 2019, Main Halls were refurbished, to modernise the facilities, and bring the offerings inline with the rest of the University's accommodation portfolio.

Back Halls was demolished in 2023 to make way for a new set of accommodation blocks, now known as Central Halls, which carried forward the names for each hall of residence, excluding Katherine Fletcher, as only 4 blocks had been constructed.

== Organisation and governance ==
=== Governance ===
The university's Chancellor is Dawn Airey, appointed in 2023. The founding Chancellor was Tanya Byron, a clinical psychologist, journalist, author and broadcaster. Byron served in the role from 2008 to 2018. The Pro-Chancellor is Clive Edwards who also serves as chair of the Board of Governors.

The current interim leadership team comprises Professor George Talbot and Lynn Hill. Professor Michael Young was Vice-Chancellor between July 2025 and February 2026. The previous incumbent John Cater held the position from 1993 until his retirement in January 2025. He received a CBE in the 2015 Queen's birthday honours. As a social geographer, he has published extensively on race, housing, economic development and public policy and co-authored major research studies for the Social Science Research Council, the Commission for Racial Equality and their successor bodies.

=== Faculties and departments ===
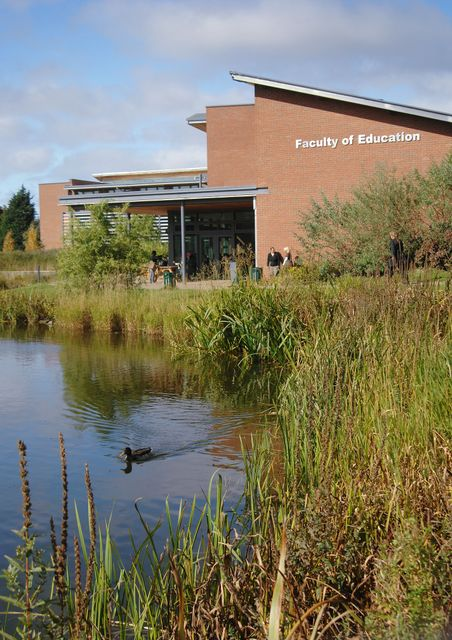
Faculty of Education Lakeside

The university has three faculties:

==== Faculty of Arts and Sciences ====
The Faculty comprises the following departments:

- Biology Department
- Business School
- Department of Computer Science
- Department of Psychology
- Department of Sport & Physical Activity
- Language Centre
- School of Creative Industries and Humanities (incorporating History, English, Creative Writing and the Creative Arts)
- School of Law & Criminal Justice

The School of Creative Industries and Humanities currently operates the Student Radio station, 'Edgehog Radio.

==== Faculty of Education ====
The Faculty runs initial teacher training programmes for the age phases of education in the UK, together with Continuing Professional Development for the school workforce. The most recent Ofsted Initial Teacher Education inspection report (2011) awarded Grade 1 in all 33 cells covering the phases of initial teacher training: Primary & Early Years, Secondary and Post-Compulsory Education and Training.

The Faculty comprises departments of

- Early Years Education
- Children, Education and Communities
- Professional Learning
- Secondary and Further Education

==== Faculty of Health, Social Care and Medicine ====
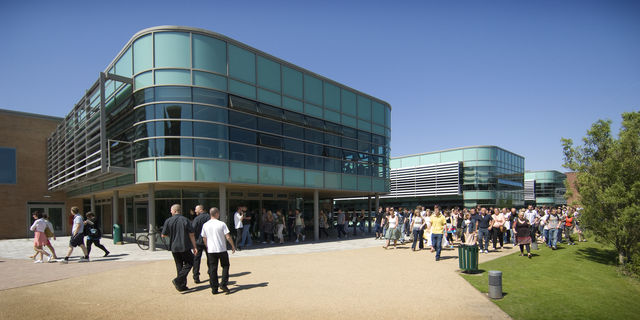
Faculty of Health, Social Care and Medicine

The Faculty delivers pre-registration training for nurses, midwives, operating department practitioners and paramedics; qualifying social work degrees; and professional development in the fields of health and social care.

The Faculty comprises departments of

- Applied Health and Social Care
- Medicine
- Midwifery
- Nursing
- Operating Department Practice
- Paramedic Practice
- Social Work
- Postgraduate & Professional Development Courses
- CPD Modules

=== Graduate school ===
The Graduate School supports research students on MRes, MPhil and PhD programmes and their supervisors.

=== Coat of arms ===
The university received a grant of arms in 2007.

The coat of arms consists of a shield, a crest, a badge and a motto. The colours used are those of the suffragettes, and "reflect the commitment to the equality of women that drove the formation of the institution".

The university's origins are represented by the three red roses of Lancashire in the shield and by the Liver bird in the crest, which refers to its original location in Liverpool. The coat of arms contains a sun, a quill, peacock feathers, and a lion. The university's motto – "In Scientia Opportunitas" – translates as "In knowledge there is opportunity".

=== The Mace ===
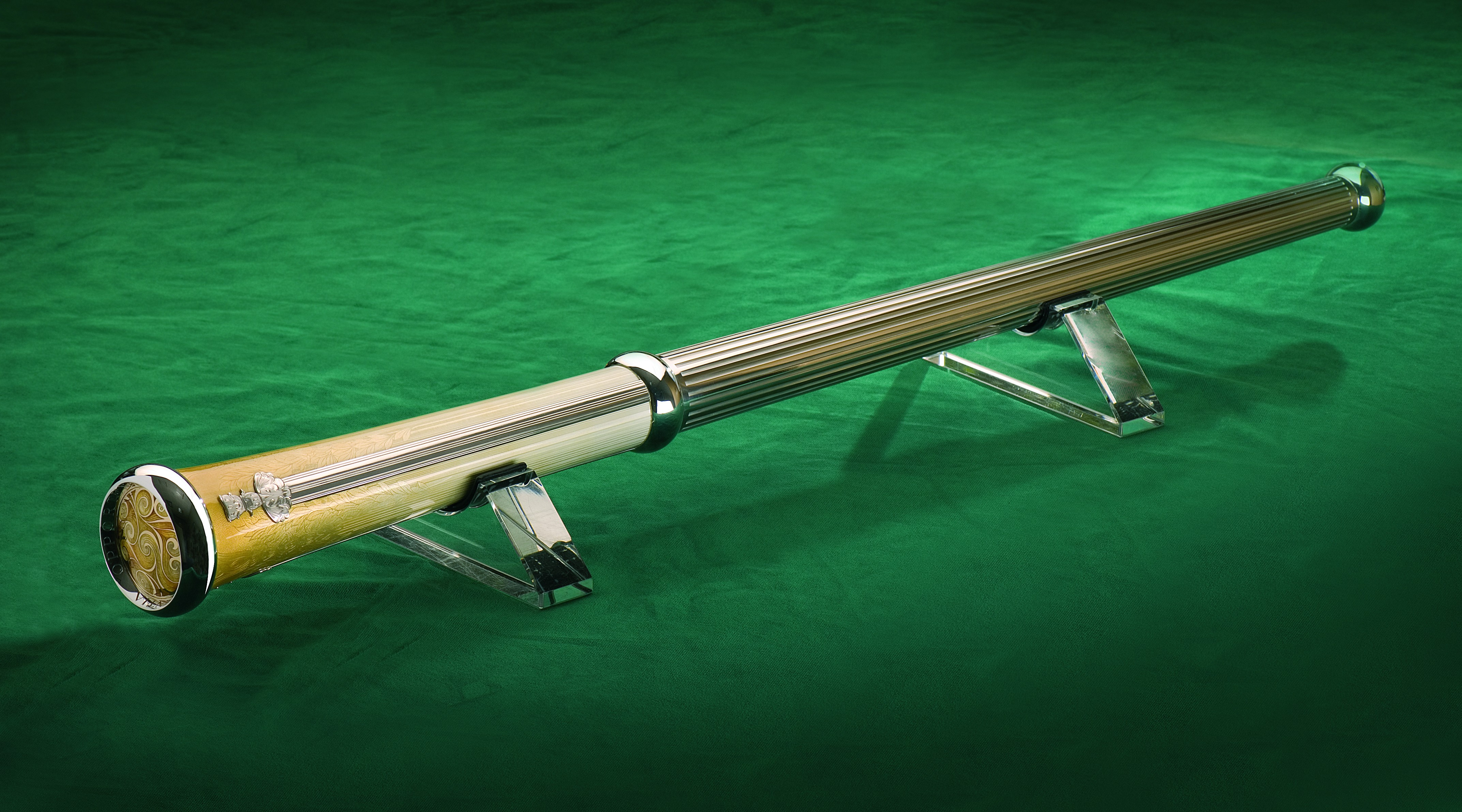
Edge Hill University Mace

The Mace is the symbol of the university's authority to award degrees. Edge Hill University commissioned its mace in 2007, from silversmith Clive Burr. Inspired by the University Coat of Arms and the campus architecture, the mace took six months to produce and is crafted from sterling silver. At the head is an 18-carat yellow gold dome enamelled by Jane Short, with a hand-engraved inscription of the university motto running around the silver edge. The main body has a hand-engraved decoration running around it, the design inspired by the acanthus leaves and stone columns of the entrance to the original University building.

== Academic profile ==
Rankings
National rankings
- Complete (2027): 57
- Guardian (2027): 60
- Times / Sunday Times (2027): 70

Global rankings
- THE (2026): 1001–1200

=== Courses ===
Edge Hill University's undergraduate courses include BA/BSc and LLB degrees, health pre-registration qualifications and teacher training degrees. Postgraduate provision includes PGCEs, Masters programmes, MBA, MPhil and PhD research degrees and MRes programmes.

=== Students ===
According to the Higher Education Statistical Agency, in the 2024/25 academic year there were 10,025 undergraduate students and 3,535 postgraduate students. The statistics may not show international students.

=== Record label ===
In 2013, Senior Lecturer and bassist in The Farm, Carl Hunter, launched a not-for-profit record label in association with the students of Edge Hill University called The Label Recordings. The Label has released and promoted music by acts including The Inkhearts, Hooton Tennis Club, Oranj Son, Feral Love and Youth Hostel. The Label operates like an industry placement for students and was 'highly commended' in the 2016 Times Higher Education Awards.

=== Short story prize ===
The Edge Hill Short Story Prize is purported to be the only UK award that recognises excellence in a single author, published short story collection. The prize attracts established authors who compete alongside relative newcomers. Previous winners have been John Burnside, Kevin Barry, Colm Tóibín, Claire Keegan, Chris Beckett, Jeremy Dyson, Graham Mort, Sarah Hall and Jessie Greengrass. The prize is co-ordinated by Ailsa Cox, Reader in Creative Writing and English, and has three categories, the main literary award of £5,000, as well as a £1,000 Reader's Prize judged by BA Creative Writing students, and a £500 award for students on the university's MA Creative Writing course.

=== Research ===
The university returned twelve units of assessment in the UK's Research Excellence Framework (REF) 2014 and has established three interdisciplinary research institutes through which to manage the impact and external engagement of research carried out.

==== Institute for Creative Enterprise ====
The Institute for Creative Enterprise is Edge Hill University's interdisciplinary research forum which connects the university with the digital and creative economy and with cultural institutions.

==== Institute for Public Policy and Professional Practice ====
The Institute for Public Policy and Professional Practice (I4P) is a cross-disciplinary research and knowledge exchange initiative established at Edge Hill University in 2013.

==== Postgraduate Medical Institute ====
The Postgraduate Medical Institute is a partnership between Edge Hill University and regional health professionals and providers seeking to improve the quality of health and social care in the North West through education, research, and innovation.

The Institute's main themes are primary care, fertility, neurology and psychiatry, orthopaedics and biomechanics, and biosciences.

==== Tackling The Blues ====
In 2015 the university launched its Tackling The Blues programme. This is a sports- and arts-based initiative attempting to improve the mental health of young people by promoting mental health literacy and assisting schools to develop approaches to wellbeing.

The university won the 2022 "Mental Health and Wellbeing Award – University Sector" Educate the North award for the programme. It subsequently won the North West Coast Research and Innovation "Tackling Health Inequalities" award (together with partner organisations Tate Liverpool and Everton F.C.'s charity Everton in the Community).

== Student life ==
=== Students' Union ===
Edge Hill University Students' Union (SU) is the representative body of students at the university run by four elected, sabbatical officers and student trustees who sit on the board. The Sabbatical officers are the SU President, Vice President of Activities, Vice President of Academic Representation and Vice President of Welfare. All students at the university are automatically enrolled into the Students' Union which seeks to promote the interests of its members, act as a representative channel between students and the university, and to provide advice and recreational activities for its members.

The Students' Union has over 70 societies which students can join, including a range of sports teams, subject-related groups and social societies. 'Team Edge Hill' is the SU's sport brand which encompasses all sport teams and individuals who compete for the university within the British Universities and Colleges Sport (BUCS) leagues including football, rugby, cycling, netball, swimming, tennis, hockey, golf, American football, and many more. Historically, VibeMedia was the Students' Union's media platform which consisted of Vibe Radio and Vibe TV, a radio and television channel run by student volunteers.

In 2012, Edge Hill SU was shortlisted for the national NUS Small Students' Union of the Year Award. In 2019, it won NUS Trans Campaign of the year.

== Notable people ==
=== Chancellors ===
- 2008-2018: Tanya Byron
- 2023-date: Dawn Airey

=== Vice-chancellor/Principals ===
Until university status was awarded in 2006, the Vice-Chancellor was known as the principal.

- 1885-1890: Sarah Jane Yelf
- 1890-1920: Sarah Jane Hale
- 1920-1941: Eva Marie Smith
- 1941-1946: E M Butterworth
- 1946-1964: Dr Margaret Bain
- 1964-1978: Ken Millins
- 1978-1982: Marjorie Stanton
- 1982-1989: Harry Webster
- 1989-1993: Ruth Gee
- 1993-2025: John Cater
- 2025-2026: Michael Young

=== Alumni ===
- Joe Ainsworth (Scriptwriter for BBC drama Holby City)
- Liam Colbon (Rugby League player)
- Julie Cooper MP (Member of Parliament and Shadow Health Minister)
- James Daly (Member of Parliament for Bury North and deputy chairman of the Conservative Party)
- Murray Dron (TV reporter/presenter)
- Dan Hodges (Newspaper columnist)
- Danny Howard (Radio 1 DJ)
- Kerry Howard (Actress)
- Eric Hughes (Rugby League player)
- Natasha Jonas (Professional boxer)
- Simon Kerrigan (Cricketer)
- Stuart Maconie (Author, DJ and television presenter)
- Simone Magill (Footballer)
- Ruth Madeley (Actress)
- Nazia Mogra (News presenter)
- Helena Normanton QC (First woman to practise as a barrister in the UK)
- Paul Nuttall (Former UKIP Leader)
- Lauren Poultney (chief constable of South Yorkshire Police)
- Jonathan Pryce (Actor)
- Steve Sinnott (General Secretary of the National Union of Teachers)
- Sue Smith (Footballer)
- Ethel Snowden née Annakin (Socialist, feminist and wife of former Chancellor of the Exchequer Philip Snowden)
- Stuart Stokes (Steeplechaser)
- Andrew Sumner (Movie journalist, publisher and TV presenter)

=== Staff ===
- Geoffrey Beattie
- Rodge Glass
- Carl Hunter
- Richard Witts

== See also ==
- Armorial of British universities
- College of Education
- List of universities in the UK
