= History of the Jews in Manchester =

The Jewish community in Manchester, England, has a history dating back to the 18th century, with early settlers establishing businesses, synagogues, and burial grounds. The population expanded in the late 19th century with Jewish immigrants fleeing persecution in the Russian Empire. Over time, the community became economically and socially prominent, with involvement in trade, banking, and philanthropy, while maintaining religious and cultural institutions. Today, it is the second-largest Jewish community in Britain, after Greater London. In the 21st century, the community has faced antisemitic attacks, including terrorist incidents in 2025 and foiled plots in 2026 targeting Jewish residents and institutions.

The history of Manchester's Jewish community is told at the Manchester Jewish Museum in Cheetham.

== First settlers ==
In the 1750s, Jews had no political rights in England, and in particular were not allowed to purchase property. As country members of the Great Synagogue, they traded as pedlars and hawkers. Small groups coalesced around safe Jew-friendly lodging houses where they organised temporary minyanim to observe the Shabbat. Liverpool was a focus for the first Jewish settlement in the North West of England, with communities in Cumberland Street who moved in 1775 to a room in Turton Court. Manchester was expanding rapidly, and in 1758 one family in trade became prosperous enough to acquire a private carriage. Manchester became an increasing important market, and Liverpool-based Jewish hawkers worked in Manchester in the week, returning to Liverpool to celebrate Sabbath.

The Manchester press was anti-Semitic. Jews traditionally traded in slop, jewellery and calligraphy and became pawnbrokers, quack doctors, seal cutters, engravers, watchmakers and miniature painters. The trades were profitable, but a miscreant could use the same skills for forgery, lockpicking and fencing stolen goods. In Manchester, there was a fear of travelling plagiarists who could reveal the profitable secrets of the cotton industry to foreign rivals and seduce cotton workers to take their skills abroad. Prescott's Manchester Journal of 1774 warned:

several JEWS and OTHER FOREIGNERS have for some months past frequented the town under various pretences and some of them have procured Spinning machines, looms, dressing machines, cutting knives and other tools used in the manufactures (sic) of fustians, cotton velvets, velveteens and other Manchester goods. ... And frequent attempts have been made to entice, persuade and seduce artificers to go foreign parts out of His Majesty's dominions... (This) will be the destruction of the trade of this country, unless timely prevented.

No Jew was ever convicted. The presence of increasingly wealthy slop dealers and hawkers was noted, and in 1788 jeweller Simon Solomon and flower dealer Hamilton Levi took shops in Long Millgate and Shudehill.

=== Settlement ===
About fourteen Jewish families settled in Manchester in 1786; their first synagogue was a rented room at Ainsworth Court, Long Millgate. Lemon and Jacob Nathan, Aaron Jacob, Isaac Franks, Abraham Isaac Cohen and his son Philip and Henry Isaacs and his sons formed the nucleus of group who leased a burial ground in 1794 and by 1796 had begun worshipping in an upper chamber room on Garden Street at Withy Grove. Aaron Jacob was the reader and shochet and Jacob Nathan was the overseer. Jews settled in streets around the synagogue. The wars against the French caused difficulties for them, particularly the Aliens Act 1793 which restricted their movement. Wolf Polack, a pawnbroker of Shudehill, was deported for undisclosed breaches of the Act in 1800. Wheeler's Manchester Chronicle supported the Act and encouraged readers to inform on them. The community was generally stable.

Samuel Solomon, who bought a plot at the burial ground, marketed the miracle cure Balm of Gilead and Solomon's Drops for curing imperfections of the skin caused by an impure state of the blood. He purchased a mansion in Kensington, Liverpool, which he called Gilead House, and an estate on Mossley Hill for a family mausoleum.

Nathan Meyer Rothschild of Frankfurt was sent to Manchester by his father in August 1800. He had spent three months in London with Levi Barent Cohen to learn English commercial practice. He arrived with £20,000 and took offices in Brown Street to circumvent English agents on the continent and obtain English textiles at source at the lowest prices. He identified three profitable areas: raw materials, dyeing, and manufacturing. He traded dye and cotton for the finished product which was shipped via Hull, Leith and London to Hamburg. Blockading by the French when the war recommenced made this task increasingly difficult. Rothschild had a house in Downing Street, Ardwick, a neat suburb favoured by the merchants of the town. At least fifteen German merchants moved to Manchester between 1800 and 1806, eight of whom were Jewish, but Rothschild was the only one to take a seat at the synagogue and conform to all its rites and ceremonies. Rothschild's money was probably responsible for securing Rabbi Joseph Crool and the walling of the burial ground. In 1805, he obtained a London office and spent less time in Manchester, as the family business shifted from trading towards finance. He married Levi Barent Cohen's daughter and through her sister established links with Moses Montefiore and the Sephardi banking and finance community in Amsterdam. He moved in 1809 to a spacious town house on Mosley Street, with a large warehouse on Back Mosley Street. The property was sold in 1810, and he left Manchester in 1811.

=== After Peterloo ===
After the Napoleonic Wars, there was rapid physical and economic expansion in Manchester. With the radical demands for political acceptance that saw the thousands on the streets at Peterloo (16 August 1819) the Jewish question was increasingly less relevant. The Jewish community supported the status quo: Jacob Nathan signed the letter pledging to support the constables in the preservation of public peace. Passionate Anglicans such as Hugh Stowell, rector of St Stephen's, Salford, promoted the Anglican Society for Promoting Christianity amongst the Jews rather than expulsion. The Manchester Guardian, founded in 1821, was firm in its support for the rights of religious minorities. The fifteen most prominent Jewish families at the time were assimilated: it was a community of shop-owners with a small elite of merchants and manufacturers. In its number were fourteen clothes dealers, nine jewellers, five quill and pencil retailers, five merchants, three hawkers, two hatters, two furriers, two dentists, two silk manufacturers, two fent dealers, an optician, a pawnbroker, a furniture dealer and a rope maker. Trade was centred on the old town, but one family lived in Clarendon Street, Chorlton-on-Medlock, in the southern suburbs, and one on Salford Crescent. Abraham Franklin had a shop in St Ann's Square, Mendelson on King Street, Behrens and Gumpel lived on Mosley Street, Aaronson's surgery was in Princess Street, and Freeman, the miniaturist, had his studio in Brazenose Street, all the best addresses. These families formed the oligarchy that ran the synagogue. Manchester had the fourth-largest Jewish community outside London.

Abraham Franklin (born 1784) took over the leadership of the Halliwell Street Synagogue. He was the son of Benjamin Wolf Franklin, whose family had come to London via Breslau from Prague. He was adopted by his aunt, the wife of a silversmith, and started his working life as a hawker of watch glasses. He was apprenticed to a watchmaker, acquired a shop in 1807, and ascended the retail ladder. He was unwaveringly orthodox and socially and culturally English. He saw no need for religious reform and opposed the disreputable new wave of immigrant Jewish hawkers who he considered, with their broken English and lack of English commercial moral values, brought disrepute on the synagogue and settled Jewish traders. He spoke out for law and order, and sent a son to Manchester Grammar School. To further the prestige and respectability of the community he sought larger accommodation, sermons in English and the formation of a choir and educational and philanthropic agencies. The 1832 cholera epidemic caused the wealthy to move from the city to outlying Broughton and Cheetham Hill, taking advantage of the new bridge over the River Irk, and along Plymouth Grove to the south. Franklin called his new home Gesunde House. (Note: Gesund is the German word for healthy.)

Alexander Jacob with Franklin's support formed the Manchester Hebrew Philanthropic Society in 1826, as the congregation accepted responsibility for the old and poor who, because of their dietary restrictions, could not use the workhouse provisions of the Poor law. Contribution was voluntary (a compulsory contribution would have had to be authorised by an Act of Parliament). Before the 1832 Reform Act Manchester had no Member of Parliament. The synagogue had to deal with the rootless poor that lived on the margins of society, un-anglicised pauper immigrants of the post-war years; working as pedlars when peddling had become uneconomic. The immigrants challenged the hard-won respectability that the community valued. Another social change was in tailoring. Second-hand clothes were not good enough for the middle classes and bespoke tailoring was expensive. Around 1830, retail middlemen started to deal with customers and put out the work on a low-profit-margin system to outworkers in sweatshops. One of the most prominent of the retail middlemen was Benjamin Hyam, who created modern mass market tailoring, where profit came from sales volume, not high prices. He claimed to make a complete suit within six hours for a fixed price in workshops attached to his shop. He advertised suits in the Manchester Guardian with a money-back guarantee. His workforce was probably over 100. Hyam was ultra-orthodox and his shop closed at sunset on Friday. His influence was great, so that by 1836 seven of the synagogue seat holders had followed his example and traded as tailors. The conditions they imposed on their workers provoked a series of unsuccessful strikes in 1833 and 1834. Ready-made clothing was the inevitable consequence of such a production system, and Hyam was advertising this in 1836. (Note: This was ten years before Lockstitch sewing machines were introduced in 1845.)

== Suburban plutocracy ==
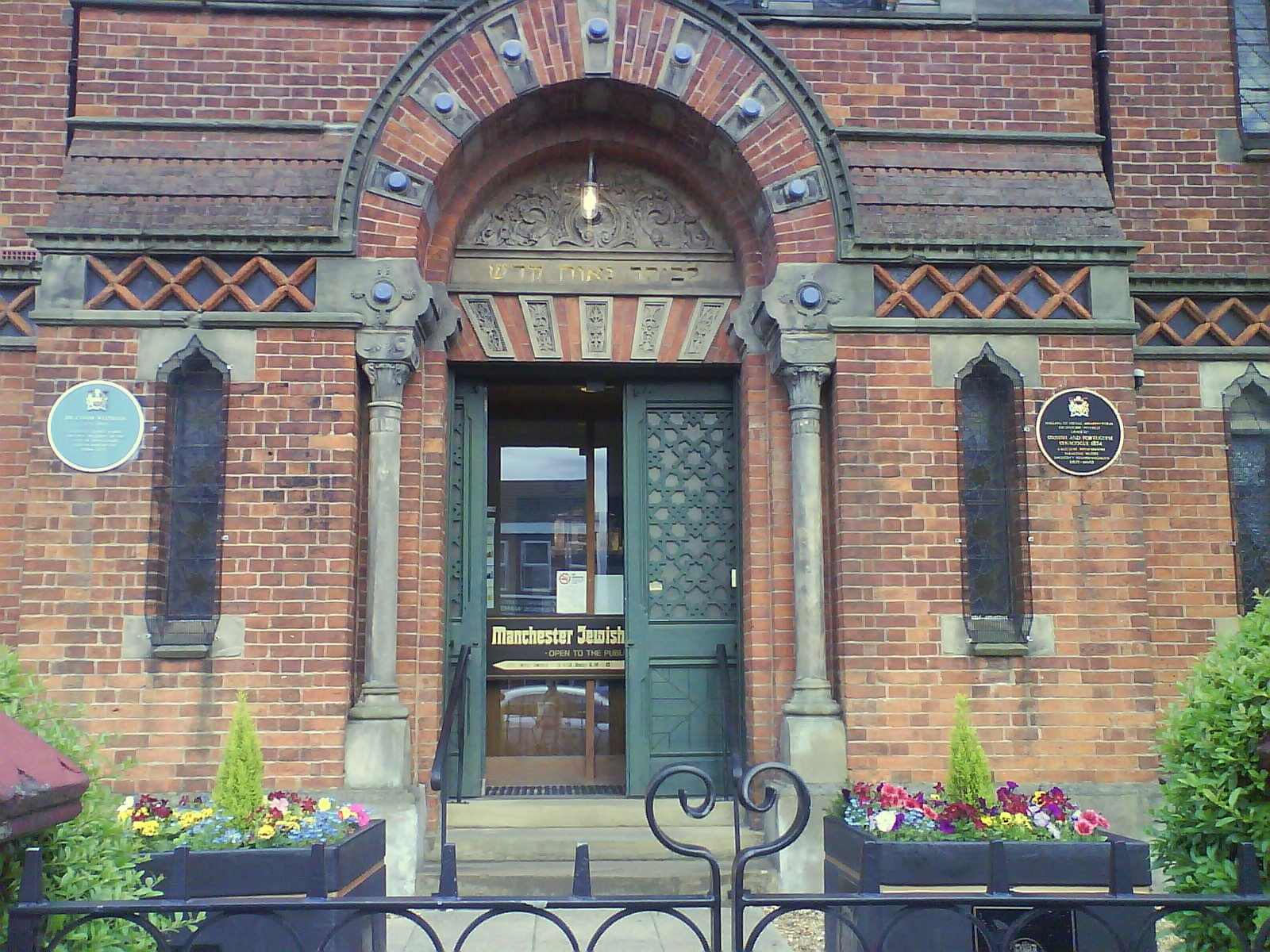
The Manchester Jewish Museum, Cheetham Hill, a former Spanish and Portuguese Congregation synagogue

1834–1836 were boom years for the cotton industry. The proprietors were driven by carriage from the suburbs, and the foremen and clerks came in by omnibuses on a half-hourly service along Upper Brook Street and Cheetham Hill. The town centre became a district of warehouses, while Newton, Ancoats and Little Ireland housed workers in slum accommodation. Franklin, Simmons, Hyam, the Jacob brothers and Simon Joseph were rich retailers. The three years from 1834 saw an influx of merchants who set up agencies in Manchester. By 1837 there were 101 foreign export firms, of which 75 were German. Thirteen new firms were run by practising Jews who were mainly young and brought solid capital to invest in permanent ventures. They differed from the established Jewish merchants who were throwing off their links to synagogue. Of the newcomers only one lapsed, as they saw no stigma attached to a Jewish identity. Though 1837–43 were years of recession, 28 more Jewish merchants migrated from the Netherlands and Northern Germany; and Samual Hadida from Gibraltar and Abraham Nissim Levy from Constantinople acquired a warehouse in Mosley Street. The 1841 census shows at least 76 Jews engaged in the cotton trade in Manchester.

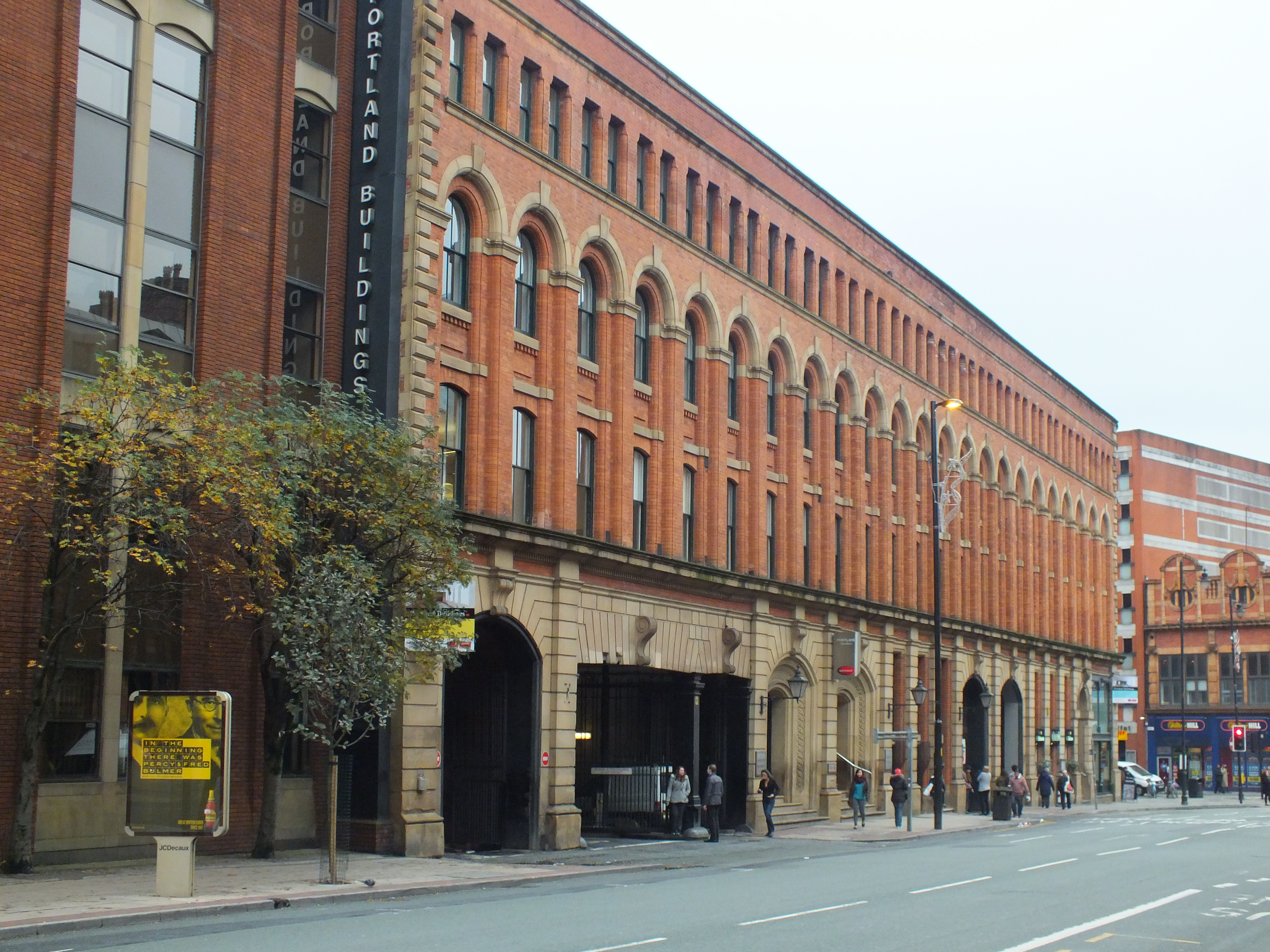
The Behrens Warehouse, Portland Street, Manchester

The Behrens Warehouse was built on the corner of Portland and Oxford Streets for Louis Behrens & Sons by P. Nunn c. 1860. The Behrens family was prominent in the banking and social life of the city's German community. Louis Behrens was the first chairman of the Schiller Anstalt (1855–1911), which was later chaired by Friedrich Engels. Charles Hallé and Karl Marx were members.

== Mid-19th century ==
1844 schism

With the political events in Germany, liberals from both synagogues came together with resident gentile Germans to support the German nationalist rebels. They participated in the Liedertafel; the 1851 census suggested that there were 1,000 persons of German birth in Manchester, of whom 292 were Jewish. Demographically the leaders of the new synagogue were moving upwardly. David Hesse had acquired a factory.

Reform synagogue

Solomon Marcus Schiller-Szinessy was elected minister of the United Congregation at Manchester. This was before the secession which led to the establishment of a Reform congregation in that city. Chiefly owing to Tobias Theodores (professor of Hebrew at Owens College), Schiller-Szinessy was offered and he accepted the office of minister to the newly formed congregation. The Manchester Reform Synagogue was founded in 1857 under the name "Manchester Congregation of British Jews" by a group consisting mainly of German-Jewish immigrants. It suffered wartime bomb damage in 1941, and was replaced by a new building in 1952.

1859 Loss of community Rabbi

The Aleppo Sephardic Jewish community of Manchester had contacted Rabbi Yeshaya Attia to come to be their Rabbi to be their leader but he disappeared. Years later a record was found that showed that, while he was a passenger on a sailing ship from Alexandria, Egypt to Liverpool, England, he was apparently lost in a storm in the Bay of Biscay on the night of 25-27 June 1859.

=== Relation to Oldham Jewish community ===
The earliest recorded evidence of the Oldham Jewish Community is the birth of Philip Cohen in 1872. Since then there have been community members moving back and forth from the two communities and while the complete history of the Oldham community remains more elusive the two communities share a common history.

== 21st century ==
On 2 October 2025, an antisemitic terrorist attack took place outside the Heaton Park Hebrew Congregation in Manchester during Yom Kippur. The attacker, Jihad al-Shamie, a 35-year-old British citizen of Syrian descent, rammed a car into pedestrians and stabbed worshippers before being shot dead by police. Two people were killed and three were seriously injured. Investigators later reported that one fatality and another victim may have been struck by police gunfire as officers ended the assault.

In 2011, Strictly Kosher, a documentary detailing the current life of the Manchester Jewish community, was released.

In February 2026, two men were sentenced to life imprisonment for planning an Islamic State‑inspired terrorist attack against the Jewish community in Manchester. Prosecutors described the plot as potentially "one of the deadliest terrorist attacks ever carried out on British soil." Walid Saadaoui (38) received a minimum of 37 years, and Amar Hussein (52) a minimum of 26 years, for preparing acts of terrorism between December 2023 and May 2024, including attempts to smuggle assault rifles and ammunition into the UK for use in mass shootings in Jewish-populated areas. A third defendant, Bilel Saadaoui, was sentenced to six years for failing to report information about the plot. The conspiracy was foiled when an undercover operative, posing as an arms dealer, helped authorities intercept the plan.

== Gallery ==
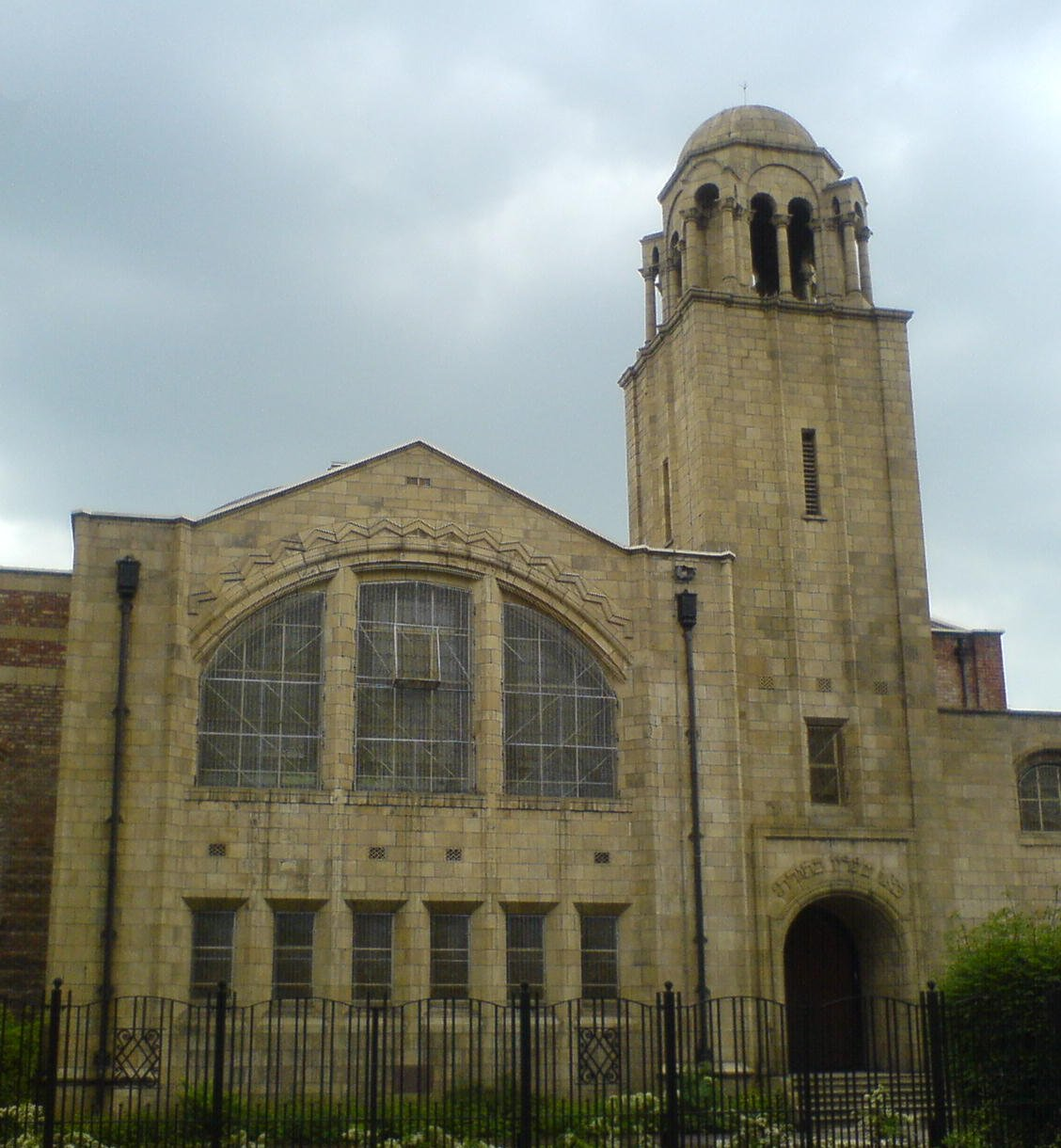
The former South Manchester Synagogue, Wilbraham Road, Fallowfield (Note: The stylistically eclectic and, for its time, structurally innovative former South Manchester Synagogue (1913–2003) has been converted to other uses)

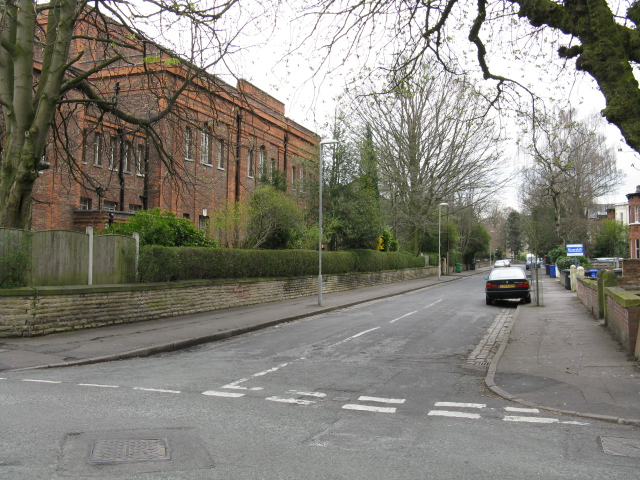
A synagogue in Queenston Road, West Didsbury

== See also ==
- Heaton Park Hebrew Congregation, Crumpsall
- Menorah Synagogue, Wythenshawe
