= Lauren Poultney =

British senior police officer

Chief Constable of South Yorkshire Police
- Incumbent
- Assumed office June 2021
- Preceded by: Stephen Watson

Personal details
- Education: Edge Hill University
- Profession: Police officer

Lauren Poultney is a British police officer and currently the Chief Constable of South Yorkshire Police.

== Early life and education ==
Poultney attended Edge Hill University from 1992 to 1995. She holds a BA (Hons) in Communication Studies with Community and Race Relations, and an MSc in Police Leadership and Management Studies.

== Career ==
In 2021, Poultney was promoted to Deputy Chief Constable and she was appointed Chief Constable in June 2021, succeeding Stephen Watson (who went onto to lead Greater Manchester Police). Poultney is the first woman to hold the position.

In November 2022, following a report from the Police Inspectorate stating that senior officers in police forces across the UK had failed to tackle predatory officers, Poultney said that she planned to "root out" sexual abusers from the police force.

In June 2023, the Peter Thatchell Foundation ran a campaign asking UK police forces to apologise for historic homophobia and failing the LGBTQ+ community; Poultney issued an apology on behalf of South Yorkshire Police in an email to local LGBT youth charity SAYiT, making South Yorkshire the third UK police force to respond to the campaign.

In December 2024, speaking to the committee following riots the previous summer, Poultney said that South Yorkshire Police's riot response was 'insufficient' stating "Knowing what we know now, of course there are things we would have done differently."

== Personal life ==
Lauren Poultney is married and has one child.
