= Sarah Hale =

Sarah Hale may refer to:

- Sarah Jane Hale, (1851–1920), British educator and second head of Edge Hill teacher training college
- Sarah Josepha Hale, American writer, activist and editor
  - SS Sarah J. Hale, a Liberty ship
- Sarah Preston Hale, American diarist, translator, columnist and newspaper publisher

== See also ==
- Sara Hale, Wales netball international
