= John Cater (geographer) =

British academic (born 1953)

John Cater CBE DL

Vice-Chancellor of Edge Hill University
- In office 1993–2025
- Chancellor: Tanya Byron; Dawn Airey
- Preceded by: Ruth Gee
- Succeeded by: Lynda Brady (interim)

Personal details
- Born: Northampton, England
- Education: University of Wales, Lampeter

John Charles Cater CBE DL (born 3 February 1953) served as vice-chancellor of Edge Hill University from 1993 to 2025. He is the longest-serving head of a United Kingdom higher education institution and is the chair of the Universities UK Teacher Education Advisory Group. Cater was appointed a Commander of the Order of the British Empire (CBE) in the 2015 Birthday Honours for services to Higher Education and Teacher Training.

== Early life ==
He was born in Northampton, England on 3 February 1953, the eldest of four children. His paternal grandfather was a tied railwayman and his maternal grandparents were travellers and smallholders. He was brought up in Towcester, Northamptonshire, and has described himself as 'that year's kid from the council estate to go to grammar school'.

== Early career ==
He completed a BA (Honours) degree in Geography at the University of Wales (Lampeter) in 1974, joining Liverpool Polytechnic (now Liverpool John Moores University) as a Research Assistant on graduating, subsequently holding Lecturer and Research Fellow posts at the same institution, working on Social Science Research Council and Community Relations Council research projects on black and Asian segregation, housing and business development. He has published a range of articles and book chapters on the above, and jointly authored a text on Social Geography with Trevor Jones.

== Edge Hill University ==
After a brief spell in a policy unit in London, Cater joined Edge Hill University in 1979, where he remained for 42 years before retiring in January 2025. This was shortly after an open letter (signed by 288 people) was presented to him, protesting against his University's decision to fire a mother who was battling cancer.

Initially appointed to a lecturing post in Geography, he became Head of Urban Policy and Race Relations in 1983 and sub-Dean of the Faculty of Humanities, Environmental and Social Sciences in 1986. He took institution-wide responsibility for Policy, Planning and Development in 1990 and was appointed Director of Resources in 1992. In June 1993 he succeeded Ruth Gee as Director and Chief Executive.

Shortly after appointment, Cater was appointed a director of the Higher Education Careers Service, a role he sustained in a variety of guises for almost two decades, and became Chair of the Standing Conference of Principals' Teacher Education Group. This interest was also reflected in his appointment, by Estelle Morris, Baroness Morris of Yardley, to the Board of the Teacher Training Agency and its successor body, the Training and Development Agency for Schools (1999–2006), where he chaired both the Audit and the Accreditation Committees. He was appointed Vice-Chair of the Standing Conference in 1997 and served as Chair from 2001 to 2003, being heavily involved in negotiations around the future status of what became the 'post-2004 universities'. Within his region, he also chaired Higher Education North West (1999–2001), Liverpool City of Learning (2003–2005) and the Greater Merseyside and West Lancashire Lifelong Learning Network (2006–2010).

In addition to his role as Vice-Chancellor, his current responsibilities include involvement in social work education and training for Universities UK, having been a past member of the Social Work Reform Board. He currently represents the sector in negotiations on the future funding of nurse education and training and is the chair of the Universities UK Teacher Education Advisory Group.

Cater was appointed a Commander of the Order of the British Empire (CBE) in the 2015 Birthday Honours for services to Higher Education and Teacher Training. He was also appointed a Deputy Lieutenant of Lancashire in 2019.

Cater's paper "Whither teacher education and training?" was published by the Higher Education Policy Institute (HEPI) in April 2017.

Cater retired as Vice-Chancellor on 31 January 2025. His successor has yet to be appointed.
