= David Crompton =

British police officer

David Andrew Crompton, QPM (born September 1963) is a retired senior British police officer. He was the chief constable of South Yorkshire Police from 2012 until his suspension in 2016 in regard to the coroner's report on the Hillsborough disaster.

He was awarded the Queen’s Police Medal in 2010.
