= Women's Emancipation Bill =

UK Parliamentary Bill on women's rights of 1919

The Women's Emancipation Bill was a Private members' bill introduced by the Labour Party in 1919, which proposed to give women voting rights on the same terms as men, to remove the disqualification blocking women from holding civil and judicial roles (such as working as civil servants, lawyers and magistrates), and to allow women who were peers in their own right to sit and vote in the House of Lords. The Bill successfully passed through the House of Commons but was replaced by a more limited Bill when it reached the House of Lords and did not become an Act.

== Context ==
The proposal of the Bill followed the Parliament (Qualification of Women) Act 1918, which had given women over 30 the right to vote.

== Progress through Parliament ==
The Bill passed its second reading in the House of Commons with 119 votes to 32 and was discussed as government agenda. At its third reading, the coalition government said that they would introduce their own Bill, but MPs were in favour of the Bill as it stood. Lord Robert Cecil was credited with having destroyed arguments against the Bill in the penultimate speech on the subject, and the government was defeated 100 to 85.

In the House of Lords, the government then brought forward the more limited Sex Disqualification (Removal) Bill. Lord Birkenhead, known to be against women's causes, criticised the Women's Emancipation Bill and introduced the alternative Bill. Unlike the Women's Emancipation Bill, this alternative Bill did not remove the age and property ownership requirements for women to vote. It also proposed to restrict the admission of women to the civil service and limit their role on juries depending on evidence or crime. It had initially proposed to allow women to sit in the Lords but the Lords removed this clause.

The Women's Emancipation Bill was dropped and its supporters turned their attention to trying to shape the Sex Disqualification (Removal) Bill. This passed as the Sex Disqualification (Removal) Act 1919 on the last day of the parliamentary session.

== Consequences ==
Women were not able to vote on the same terms as men until 1928. They were not able to sit in the House of Lords on equal terms to men until the Peerage Act 1963. Women were able to be excluded from juries on cases such as sexual assault until 1972.
