= Peacehaven mosque arson =

2025 crime in East Sussex, England

- Location: Phyllis Avenue, Peacehaven, East Sussex, England
- Date: 4 October 2025; 9:50 PM (BST (UTC+01:00))
- Target: Peacehaven Community Centre & Mosque
- Attack type: Arson

On 4 October 2025, Peacehaven Community Centre & Mosque in East Sussex was set on fire in a suspected hate crime. CCTV footage showed two masked individuals spraying an accelerant on the front door before igniting a fire. Sussex police confirmed the incident, in which no-one was injured, was being treated as a hate crime.

== Background ==
The attack took place two days after an attack on a synagogue in Manchester, which left three people dead, including the attacker. Tell MAMA, an anti-Islamophobia group, had recorded 6,000 Islamophobic incidents in the UK in 2024, a record high since it began recording statistics in 2012.

== Investigation ==
As of 10 October 2025, police had arrested four men under suspected connection with the attack, all of whom had been released under conditional bail. On 17 October, Crimestoppers announced a reward of £10,000 for information leading to a conviction.

On 23 October, two suspects were charged with arson with intent to endanger life in connection with the attack.

On 4 November it was reported that "as a result of information and evidence that has come to light" during ongoing inquiries, counter-terrorism officers from Counter Terrorism Policing South East had taken over the investigation.

On 14 November the two charged suspects appeared in court by videolink from jail, and were remanded into custody. The case will be heard by a High Court judge at Kingston Crown Court. A provisional trial date has been set for 1 December 2026.

On 24 March 2026, three further arrests were made by the counter-terrorism police investigating the attack. These were; a 36-year-old man from Eastbourne on suspicion of conspiracy to commit arson, a 38 year-old-man for malicious communications and suspicion of criminal damage, and a 42 year-old man for malicious communications and suspicion of encouraging or assisting a crime. All three were released on bail.

On 1 May 2026, one of the charged suspects plead guilty, admitting to setting fire to the mosque, but denying trying to harm those inside. The other plead not guilty.

== Reactions ==
The attack was condemned by Prime Minister Keir Starmer and Home Secretary Shabana Mahmood. Wajid Akhter, secretary general of the Muslim Council of Britain, said: "These incidents do not occur in a vacuum. This comes as media and political figures escalate collective blame and deliberate misrepresentation of Muslim communities, their causes and their faith." On 10 October, local MP Chris Ward and members of the Muslim Council of Britain visited the mosque during the first Friday prayer since the attack took place.

Some local residents have said that they believed Operation Raise the Colours had "created the climate" for the attack, with Phyllis Avenue having been lined with flags. The Peacehaven mosque manager said "Anti-Islamic sentiment is spreading [...] We personally don’t have anything wrong with the flag of the country as long as it’s done with the right intention. But these have been put up with an intent to divide."

== See also ==
- 2017 Finsbury Park van attack – A car-attack on a crowd of Muslim pedestrians near a mosque in North London
- 2024 Newtownards mosque petrol bombing – A petrol bombing of a mosque in Northern Ireland
