= Jane Lighting =

British television executive

Jane Elizabeth Stuart Lighting FRSA FRTS (born 22 December 1956) is a former Chief Executive of Five (TV) in the United Kingdom.

== Early life ==
She attended Oakdene School, a girls' school in Beaconsfield, Buckinghamshire, which closed in 1992.

== Career ==
She began her career in 1976 with Crown Cassette Communications as a secretary.

=== Flextech Television ===
In 1999 she became Chief Operating Officer, then Chief Executive of Flextech Television, owned by Telewest, which operated Bravo and Living TV, now part of Living TV Group.

=== Five TV ===
She became Chief Executive of Five TV in April 2003, succeeding Dawn Airey, who had been there since October 2000. She launched Five US (now 5 USA) in October 2006. The television channel was known colloquially as the three Fs channel. In October 2006, she brought in her friend from Flextech, Lisa Opie, to become Managing Director of Content for the channel.

She left Five TV on 2 May 2008, being replaced the year after by Dawn Airey.

== Personal life ==
She co-owns a pub in Combeinteignhead, Haccombe with Combe, in South Devon. She has two step children (Charles and Lauren) with her partner, and lives in north-west London.

Media offices
| Preceded by Dawn Airey | Chief Executive: Five TV; April 2003-May 2008 | Succeeded by Dawn Airey |
| Preceded by | Chief Executive: Flextech Television; 2002-2003 | Succeeded by |
| Preceded by | Chairman: Royal Television Society; 2006-2007 | Succeeded by Wayne Garvie |
