= Ivy Williams =

British barrister and law scholar (1877–1966)

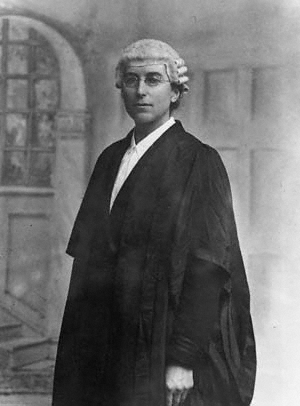
- Born: 7 September 1877; Newton Abbot, Devon, England
- Died: 18 February 1966 (aged 88); Oxford, Oxfordshire, England
- Education: Society of Oxford Home Students; University of London (LLB, LLD); St Anne's College, Oxford (DCL)
- Occupation: law lecturer
- Known for: first woman called to the UK bar

Ivy Williams (7 September 1877 – 18 February 1966) was the first woman to be called to the English bar, in May 1922. She never practised, but she was the first woman to teach law at a British university.

== Education ==
Williams studied law at the Society of Oxford Home Students (later St Anne's College), the third woman to study law at Oxford University. By 1903, she had completed all her law examinations, but was prevented by the prevailing regulations concerning the qualification of women at Oxford from matriculating or receiving her BA, MA, and BCL until the regulations were reformed in 1920. She obtained Bachelor of Laws (LLB) degree from the University of London in 1901, and LLD from the same university in 1903.

After the Sex Disqualification (Removal) Act 1919 came into force in December 1919, which abolished the prohibition on women becoming barristers, she joined the Inner Temple as a student on 26 January 1920 after Theodora Llewelyn Davies. Olive Clapham was the first woman to pass bar finals examinations (in May 1921), but she would not be called to the bar until 1924. Williams became England's first female barrister when she was called to the bar on 10 May 1922, having received a certificate of honour (first class) in her final bar examination in Michaelmas 1921 which excused her from keeping two terms of dinners. Her call to the bar was described by the Law Journal as "one of the most memorable days in the long annals of the legal profession". She was soon followed by other women, including Helena Normanton and Jane Sissmore.

== Career ==
Williams did not enter private practice, but taught law at the Society of Oxford Home Students from 1920 to 1945, making her the first woman to teach law at an English university. In 1923 she became the first woman to be awarded the degree of DCL (Doctor of Civil Law) in Oxford for her published work, The Sources of Law in the Swiss Civil Code. In 1956, she was elected an Honorary Fellow of St Anne's College, Oxford.

== Personal and later life ==
She enjoyed tennis, travelling, gardening, and driving. She learned to read Braille after she began to lose her sight in later life, and she wrote a Braille primer which was published by the National Institute for the Blind in 1948.

She died in Oxford in 1966.

== Dedications ==
In 2020, barrister Karlia Lykourgou set up the first outfitter dedicated to offering courtwear for women. She named it Ivy & Normanton, in honour of Williams and Helena Normanton.

A blue plaque to her memory was installed on her home at 12 King Edward Street, Oxford, on 21 September 2020.

== Family ==
Williams was born in Newton Abbot in Devon and was educated privately. Her parents were Emma and George St Swithin Williams. Her father was a solicitor. Her brother Winter Williams became a barrister, but died in an accident on 14 July 1903.

== See also ==
- Ethel Benjamin
- First women lawyers around the world
- Clara Brett Martin
