= Olive Clapham =

British barrister (1898–1973)

- Born: 21 January 1898
- Died: 7 March 1973 (aged 75)
- Education: French Convent School, Hull; Society of Oxford Home Students
- Occupation: Barrister
- Known for: First woman to pass the bar finals examinations in England and Wales

Olive Catherine Clapham (married name Miles; 21 January 1898 – 7 March 1973) was a British barrister. She was the first woman to pass the bar finals examinations in England and Wales.

== Biography ==
Clapham was born on 21 January 1898 in Wakefield, Yorkshire, England, to a Roman Catholic family. Her mother, Catherine Clapham (née Gill; 1862–1951), had been a schoolmistress and her father, Walter Clapham (1858–1902), was a printer, part proprietor of the Wakefield Free Press, and a Liberal councillor. Following the death of her father, the family moved to Kingston upon Hull to live with her paternal aunt. She was educated at the French Convent School in Hull run by canonesses of St Augustine. She also studied at the Hull and East Riding College of Music.

In October 1916, Clapham registered as a member of the Society of Oxford Home Students (this would later become St Anne's College, Oxford). She lived in the St Frideswide hostel for Roman Catholic women students. She studied English Literature, before switching to jurisprudence in the second year. As such, she became one of only three female law students at the university. She achieved second-class honours in her final exams in 1919, but women were not yet allowed to graduate from the University of Oxford. She then went on to study for the post-graduate Bachelor of Civil Law (BCL) degree, achieving third-class honours in June 1920. With women having been allowed to join the University of Oxford in 1920, she matriculated on 30 October 1920 and graduated with her Bachelor of Arts (BA) degree the same day. On 28 June 1923, she graduated with her BCL degree and, as per tradition, had her BA promoted to a Master of Arts (MA Oxon) degree.

The Sex Disqualification (Removal) Act 1919 allowed for women to become legal professionals, and Clapham was admitted to Middle Temple, one of the Inns of Courts, on 17 January 1920 while still studying for her BCL degree. In May 1921, she became the first woman to pass the bar finals examinations, thereby qualifying as a barrister in England and Wales. She was not, however, the first woman called to the bar (this was Ivy Williams in May 1922), and it was incorrectly reported at the time that she was the first woman barrister. Having fulfilled the required dining terms at Middle Temple, Clapham was called to the bar on 17 November 1924. The details of her practice are not known, but when she emigrated to Ceylon on 31 December 1926, she gave her profession as "barrister".

In Ceylon, Clapham married George Cockburn Miles (1898–1980), a member of the Ceylon Civil Service. Together they had five children: four sons (born 1928, 1929, 1933, and 1936), and one daughter (born 1943). They returned to England in 1935. She died on 7 March 1973 of heart disease in Aldbury, Hertfordshire, England.
