= Murder of Amy-Leanne Stringfellow =

British soldier (died 2020)

Amy-Leanne Stringfellow was a former soldier who was fatally beaten and stabbed in June 2020 by her ex-boyfriend while he was on bail for assaulting her previously. Amy-Leanne lived in Doncaster and was 26 when she died.

An inquest into Amy-Leanne's death attracted press interest in the UK in 2021 as part of the coverage of violence against women in the wake of the death of Sarah Everard. South Yorkshire Police were also subject to an inquiry to determine if mistakes had been made regarding her previous complaints. Amy-Leanne's murderer used a vodka bottle and ornamental sword to kill her. He admitted the murder and died in Leeds Prison in November 2020.
