= Ada Summers =

British magistrate

Ada Summers MBE JP
- Councillor Summers
- Born: Ada Jane Broome; 1861; Oldham, England
- Died: 1944 (aged 82–83)
- Other names: Ada Jane Summers, "The Lady Bountiful"
- Occupation: Philanthropist
- Known for: First female Magistrate and Justice of the Peace in Britain; first female councillor and Mayor of Stalybridge
- Spouse: John Summers (d. 1910)

Ada Jane Summers (née Broome; 1861–1944) was the first British woman to sit as a magistrate, and one of the first women in England to become a Justice of the Peace. She was also the first female councillor, mayor and freeman of Stalybridge near Manchester. She was also a philanthropist.

== Early and personal life ==
She was born in Oldham in 1861, where her father George Broome owned a textile mill.

In 1881, she married John Summers JP, of the John Summers & Sons steelworks. His family owned the Globe Ironworks in Stalybridge. They had four children, Kathleen, John Broome, Gerald, and Ada. John died in 1903, aged nineteen, when he fell from a hotel window in St Ives, Cornwall. Their son Gerald Summers (1885-1969) became a painter. Her husband died in 1910.

== Political and judicial career ==
Summers was elected as a Liberal Party councillor in Stalybridge in 1912. She was then elected mayor in November 1919, and served until 1921. As Mayor of Stalybridge, she was ex officio a Justice of the Peace, and was sworn in as the first female Justice of the Peace in England on 31 December 1919, one week after the Sex Disqualification (Removal) Act 1919 came into force. In October 1920 she was appointed a Justice of the Peace in the borough in her own right, again the first woman in Britain to be so appointed.

She was appointed a Member of the Order of the British Empire in 1918, and became an honorary Freeman of the borough in 1939.

== Philanthropy ==
Summers used the wealth inherited from her husband to pursue philanthropic aims, including funding a maternity and child welfare centre, and an employment centre in Stalybridge, the Ladies Work Society. She set up a nurses' home in 1926. At Christmas she would give presents to local children, and she paid for a Christmas tree.

She served as president of Stalybridge Mechanics Institute from 1926 until 1936. She founded a boys club in January 1929, which became known as "Mrs Summers Boy's Club". She was president of the Stalybridge branch of the British and Foreign Bible Society. She was also involved with the probation and social services of the Police Court Mission.

She was among the first contributors to the Young Men's Christian Association National War Service Fund when she donated £100 in 1939.

After her death, she was described (without irony) as "Lady Bountiful".

== Legacy ==
Summers died in 1944. There is a blue plaque about her at Stalybridge Civic Hall.
