= Stephen Watson (police officer) =

Senior police officer in England

Sir Sir Stephen Watson QPM QPM

Chief Constable of Greater Manchester Police
- Incumbent
- Assumed office May 2021
- Preceded by: Ian Hopkins

Chief Constable of South Yorkshire Police
- In office 2016–2021

Deputy Chief Constable of Durham Constabulary
- In office 2015–2016

Commander at Metropolitan Police
- In office 2011–2015

Personal details
- Awards: Knight Bachelor (2025 Birthday Honours)

Sir Stephen Watson is a British police officer. Since 2021, he has been the chief constable of Greater Manchester Police.

Watson joined Lancashire Constabulary in 1988. In 2006, he was promoted to chief superintendent and joined Merseyside Police, and later served as area commander for Liverpool North for three years. In 2011, he joined the Metropolitan Police as Commander for the East Area; he had over 6,000 police officers under his command. He was involved in policing in the aftermath of the 2011 riots and was a senior member of the 2012 Olympic Command Team. From 2015 to 2016, he was deputy chief constable of Durham Constabulary, and from 2016 to 2021 he was the chief constable of South Yorkshire Police. Since May 2021, he has been the chief constable of Greater Manchester Police (GMP), the second-largest police force in England and Wales with over 14,000 staff.

Prior to Watson's appointments at South Yorkshire Police and GMP, both authorities had been placed in special measures by HM Inspectorate of Constabulary and Fire & Rescue Services; he has been credited with rapidly improving both forces and turning them into "high performing organisations". At GMP, he also started Operation Vulcan, a major operation in 2022 against counterfeit goods and associated criminality; GMP has received multiple awards for the operation. The BBC has reported that during Watson's tenure as chief constable at GMP, arrest numbers have increased from 33,500 in 2021 to 67,000 in 2024. Andy Burnham, then mayor of Greater Manchester, commended Watson's "back-to-basics approach" and focus on neighbourhood policing. In 2025, Watson's contract at GMP (which had been due to expire in 2026) was extended by a further two years.

== Personal life ==
Watson has an MBA. He has two children; sails, enjoys rugby union, travelling, current affairs, and history.

== Honours ==
Watson received the Queen's Police Medal in the 2019 Birthday Honours, and was knighted in the 2025 Birthday Honours.

Ribbon	Description	Notes
	Knight Bachelor (Kt)	2025 King's Birthday Honours List.; "For services to Policing".
	Queen's Police Medal (QPM)	2019 Queen's Birthday Honours List.
	Queen Elizabeth II Golden Jubilee Medal	2002; UK Version of this Medal
	Queen Elizabeth II Diamond Jubilee Medal	2012; UK Version of this Medal
	Queen Elizabeth II Platinum Jubilee Medal	2022; UK Version of this Medal
	King Charles III Coronation Medal	2023; UK Version of this Medal
	Police Long Service and Good Conduct Medal	
