= Sex Disqualification (Removal) Act 1919 =

Act of the Parliament of the United Kingdom granting women more work rights

Sex Disqualification (Removal) Act 1919 (Note: Section 4(1).)
- Act of Parliament
- Parliament of the United Kingdom
- Long title: An Act to amend the Law with respect to disqualifications on account of sex.
- Citation: 9 & 10 Geo. 5. c. 71
- Territorial extent: United Kingdom

Dates
- Royal assent: 23 December 1919
- Commencement: 23 December 1919 (Note: The Acts of Parliament (Commencement) Act 1793.)
- Repealed: England and Wales and Scotland: 1 October 2010 (Note: The Equality Act 2010 (Commencement No. 4, Savings, Consequential, Transitional, Transitory and Incidental Provisions and Revocation) Order 2010 (SI 2010/2317).)
Other legislation
Amended by	Statute Law Revision Act 1927; Solicitors Act 1932; Courts Act 1971; Criminal Justice Act 1972; Criminal Procedure (Scotland) Act 1975; Law Reform (Miscellaneous Provisions) (Scotland) Act 1980; Statute Law (Repeals) Act 1989; Equality Act 2010 (Consequential Amendments, Saving and Supplementary Provisions) Order 2010
Repealed by	England and Wales and Scotland: Equality Act 2010

Status: Repealed

Text of statute as originally enacted

Revised text of statute as amended

The Sex Disqualification (Removal) Act 1919 (9 & 10 Geo. 5. c. 71) was an act of the Parliament of the United Kingdom. It became law when it received royal assent on 23 December 1919. The act enabled women to join the professions and professional bodies, to sit on juries and be awarded degrees. It was a government compromise, a replacement for a more radical private members' bill, the Women's Emancipation Bill.

== Provisions ==
The basic purpose of the act was, as stated in its long title, "to amend the Law with respect to disqualification on account of sex", which it achieved in four short sections and one schedule. Its broad aim was achieved by section 1, which stated that:

A person shall not be disqualified by sex or marriage from the exercise of any public function, or from being appointed to or holding any civil or judicial office or post, or from entering or assuming or carrying on any civil profession or vocation, or for admission to any incorporated society (whether incorporated by Royal Charter or otherwise), [and a person shall not be exempted by sex or marriage from the liability to serve as a juror] ...

The Crown was given the power to regulate the admission of women to the civil service by Orders in Council, and judges were permitted to control the gender composition of juries.

By section 2, women were to be admitted as solicitors after serving three years only if they possessed a university degree which would have qualified them if male, or if they had fulfilled all the requirements of a degree at a university which did not, at the time, admit women to degrees.

By section 3, no statute or charter of a university was to preclude university authorities from regulating the admission of women to membership or degrees.

By section 4, any orders in council, royal charters, or statutory provisions which were inconsistent with this act were to cease to have effect.

== Effects ==
Women had previously been given a (limited) right to vote by the Representation of the People Act 1918, and had been able to stand for Parliament, but most of the less high-profile restrictions on women participating in civil life remained. In effect, this act lifted most of the existing common-law restrictions on women; they were now able, for example to serve as magistrates or jurors, or enter the professions. Marriage was no longer legally considered a bar to a woman's ability to work in these spheres.

The act came into force on the day it became law, 23 December 1919; the first female justice of the peace – Ada Summers, ex officio a Justice by virtue of being the Mayor of Stalybridge – was sworn in a week later, on 31 December. However, it took until December 1922 for a female solicitor to be appointed. The first women barristers to be appointed were Frances 'Fay' Kyle and Averil Deverell in Ireland in November 1921. Olive Clapham was the first woman in England to pass the bar finals examinations in May 1921, but a woman (Ivy Williams) would not be called to the English Bar until May 1922.

The act was, by the standards of its time, astonishingly broad. It only addressed three areas specifically – the Civil Service, the courts, and the universities – leaving all other areas to the sweeping alterations made by section 1. Francis Bennion later described it as "splendidly general", arguing that it went "further in emancipating women than [did] the Sex Discrimination Act 1975".

However, the act was rarely invoked by the courts – the first court case to rule based on it was Nagle v Feilden in 1966, in a case brought by female horse trainer Florence Nagle against the Jockey Club's refusal to grant her a training licence on grounds of her sex. The one significant ruling as to the extent of the Act was not in a court of law, but rather in the House of Lords, where the Committee for Privileges was asked by Margaret Mackworth, 2nd Viscountess Rhondda to rule if the Act's provisions for exercising "any public function" extended to permitting a woman to sit in the House as a peeress in her own right. After some debate, it was held 22–4 that it did not. Women would not be permitted to sit in the Lords until 1958, when appointed female life peers were expressly permitted by the Life Peerages Act 1958, whilst hereditary peeresses gained the right to take their seats after the passage of the Peerage Act 1963.

Much of the act has been repealed, although the first part of section 1 remains in force (in Scotland it was repealed in relation to criminal proceedings by the Criminal Procedure (Scotland) Act 1975), as well as the whole of section 3.

A 2016 study of the inclusion of women on juries from 1918 to 1926 at the Old Bailey (London) finds that

the inclusion of females had little effect on overall conviction rates but resulted in a large and significant increase in convictions for sex offences and on the conviction rate differential between violent crime cases with female versus male victims. The inclusion of women also increased the likelihood of juries being discharged without reaching a verdict on all charges and the average time taken to reach a verdict. A complementary analysis of cases in which the jury was carried over from a previous trial also implies that the inclusion of female jurors on the seated jury sharply increased conviction rates for violent crimes against women versus men.

A 2017 study looking at female jurors outside London during the first decade after the 1919 Act found that the picture was highly localised, but that one common feature throughout England and Wales was a decline in the number of women serving on juries. In the Midlands, the average assize jury went from having between 3.3 and 2.9 women in 1921, to having between 2.0 and 2.4 in 1929. In the south of England (excluding London), the average jury went from having between 2.0 and 1.3 women per jury in 1921 to an average of just 0.8 by the end of the decade. Juries usually had no female members when they were trying sexual offences whose victim was neither female nor a child, as sex between men and acts of bestiality were considered too shocking for men and women to deliberate on together. In most regions, all-male juries were uncommon for property offences, presumably because trials for theft and other similar offences were considered suitable subjects for men and women to deliberate on together. There were also regional differences. In the southeast of England, all-male juries were particularly unusual for trials concerning homicide and offences against the state. In south Wales, the same was true for non-fatal offences against the person; and in southwest England, there were fewer all-male juries in sexual offence trials involving female victims. In the Midlands, where there were generally more female jurors anyway, there were no differences beyond the general trends noted above regarding male-only sexual offences and property offences.

Subsequent reforms made the juror franchise more restrictive than it had been immediately after 1919. In December 1920, ten towns that had previously not been required to consider the wealth of the people they were selecting for jury service were newly required to do so. Crosby has found that this resulted in an immediate decrease in the number of women serving on these towns' juries. Two years later, the law was changed again so that all jurors now had to be registered to vote in the same place that they held their landed property. When this change was proposed, Parliamentary counsel noted that "In the case ... of (e.g.) a daughter who resides with her father in a house occupied by him and owns a small estate somewhere in the country, the position is that she is at present qualified as a juror, but in future she will not be. There are not, however, I should suppose, very many such cases, and I should think such as there are can safely be disregarded."

== Subsequent developments ==
In section 1 of the act, the words "and a person shall not be exempted by sex or marriage from the liability to serve as a juror", and in section 4(2) of the act, the words from "and any enactment relating to juries" onwards, were repealed by section 64(2) of, and part I of schedule 6 to, the Criminal Justice Act 1972, which came into force on 30 March 1974.

In 2019 the act was commemorated by the First 100 Years project, to recognise the impact of women in law since the act becoming law.
