= Murder of Michael Kahan =

2008 anti-semitic hate crime

Michael Kahan (5 June 1968 − 1 June 2008) was a Jewish klezmer violinist who was stabbed to death outside a kosher bakery in Crumpsall, Manchester, on 1 June 2008 by paranoid schizophrenic Jonathan Mills, aged 37, who was suffering delusions that Jews were conspiring against him.

== Background ==
=== Michael Kahan ===
Michael Kahan was a klezmer violinist. He met clarinetist Ros Hawley as a student at the Royal Northern College of Music and together they formed a duo in 2003 called "Shna'im Lecha'im" but later called the "Klezmer Gourmet". Kahan had three children and was expected to turn forty a few days after his death.

=== Jonathan Mills ===
Jonathan Mills was a paranoid schizophrenic who believed that Jews were conspiring against him. The onset of his mental illness began in 2001 when he had shown these beliefs. In 2002, his medication was switched and the drug reduced to a relatively low level. However, in summer 2007, when Mills started drinking, his mental state deteriorated and he was sectioned at Park House in North Manchester General Hospital three months prior to the attack and he was discharged 10 days prior.

== Incident and investigation ==
On Sunday morning, 1 June 2008, ten days after being discharged from a psychiatric hospital. Jonathan Mills was driving in his car and thinking of committing an attack on a Jew, he saw Kahan who was visiting a local kosher bakery store to eat some bagels for breakfast. When Mills saw Kahan, he heard a voice telling him "Do it. Do it now." He got out of the car and stabbed Kahan two times in the stomach.

An off duty doctor and nurse arrived on the scene and attempted to revive him, he was rushed to hospital but died of his wounds soon afterwards.

== Trial and sentencing ==
In December 2008, Mills plead guilty to manslaughter on the grounds of diminished responsibility at Tameside magistrates court and was detained in a high security psychiatric hospital indefinitely.

== Inquest ==
Four years after Kahan's death, an inquest was held to discover what led to his death.

== Tribute ==
At the Martin Harris Centre at the University of Manchester, the "Michael Kahan Kapelye" is an event named in commemoration of the murdered violinist.
