= Dawn Airey =

British media executive (born 1960)

Dawn Airey CBE
- Born: Dawn Elizabeth Airey; 15 November 1960 (age 65); Preston, Lancashire, England
- Citizenship: United Kingdom
- Occupation: media executive
- Employer(s): Channel 4 & Getty Images
- Known for: Channel 5 (1996–02); ITV plc (formerly); Sky UK (formerly); Yahoo (formerly); Getty Images; Channel 4; The FA (2019–present)
- Title: non-executive director
- Partner: Jacqueline Lawrence

Dawn Elizabeth Airey CBE (born 15 November 1960) is a British media executive, sports administrator and independent company director.

She is the Chancellor of Edge Hill University, and chairs the Barclays FA Women's Super League and Championship board, the National Youth Theatre and the educational platform Digital Theatre+. Airey is a non-executive director of Channel 4, Getty Images, Grosvenor Estates and Blackbird.

She is best known for her tenure between 1996 and 2002 at Channel 5, as the inaugural Director of Programmes, and subsequently Chief Executive, and has held senior positions at ITV plc, Sky UK, Yahoo! and Getty Images.

== Early life ==
Airey was born in Preston, Lancashire. She was educated at Girton College, Cambridge, where she studied geography.

== Career ==
Airey began her career as a management trainee at Central Independent Television in 1985. In 1989 she was promoted to the position of Director of Programme Planning and was appointed to the Central broadcasting board. When the ITV Network Centre was established in 1993, she moved to London to become the combined network's first Controller of Children's and Daytime Programmes.

In 1994, she was appointed Controller of Arts and Entertainment at Channel 4, where it was reported that her forthright manner had earned her the soubriquets "Scary Airey" and "Zulu Dawn" and her commitment to popularism was deemed by one colleague as "vulgar".

Airey joined Channel 5 in 1996, the year ahead of its launch, as the first director of programmes. It was during her tenure that she agreed with an interviewer's description of the channel's core strengths as "films, football and f***ing" but added that it was about much more. She was subsequently appointed as chief executive of the channel in 2000.

In 2002, amid rumours that ITV plc was reportedly pursuing her to become its chief executive., Airey surprised the television industry by instead accepting a position at the satellite broadcaster, BSkyB. overseeing all non-sports channels, their programming and all advertising sales. In 2006, she became Sky's managing director of Channels and Services with added responsibility for third party channels, joint ventures and networked media.

Airey departed BSkyB to head up an independent production business backed by private investors however she was only with the company for a total of eight days before it was announced that the venture did not have sufficient cash to continue trading. Soon after, in May 2007, she was reunited with Michael Grade, joining ITV plc as Director of Global Content, running the broadcaster's production and global sales division.

But within a matter of months she had again been poached by Channel 5 to become chairman and CEO, with a remit to increase profitability and audience share. This she did. RTL's decision to exit UK broadcasting and sell the company to Richard Desmond's Northern & Shell saw her elevated to the role of President of RTL-owned CLT-UFA., where she served between 2010 and 2013.

In August 2013, she joined Yahoo! as senior vice-president of Yahoo EMEA (Europe, the Middle East and Africa). She was in the post until September 2015.

Airey was chief executive officer (CEO) of Getty Images photo agency from October 2015 to 31 December 2018, at which time she became a non-executive director member of its board.

In March 2023 Airey was appointed Chancellor of Edge Hill University.

In 2026, it was announced that Airey would become chair of Arts Council England from 1 August. The position is a part-time role for two days per week and is for an initial period of four years.

== Football ==
In 2019, The Football Association appointed Airey as chair of the new joint Barclays FA Women's Super League and Championship board.

The 12-strong board, including six women, was established by the FA as part of its commitment to growing the women's game.

It was during Airey's tenure that the FA agreed a landmark three-year broadcast deal with the BBC and Sky that delivered more access to live women's football than ever before.

In 2021, she also served as a member of the Government's Expert Panel for a Fan-Led Review of Football Governance, led by the former Sports Minister Tracey Crouch. The review called for the creation of an independent regulator for the game, alongside greater powers for supporters and an improved "owners and director's test" for those seeking to control local clubs.

== Directorships ==
Airey chairs the joint Barclays FA Women's Super League and Championship board (2019–) and the boards of the National Youth Theatre (2011–) and the educational platform Digital Theatre+ (2019–).

She is a non-Executive Director of Channel 4 (2021–), cloud video platform Blackbird (2019–), Grosvenor Estates (2019–) and Getty Images (2015–).

Previously she has held positions on the boards of UK Film Council, the British Library, easyJet, Thomas Cook and LoveFilm.

On 2 June 2026, The Secretary of State for Culture, Media and Sport appointed Airey as Chair of the Arts Council England for a term of 4 years, starting on 1 August 2026.

== Honours ==
Airey is a Fellow and a Vice President of the Royal Television Society and a Fellow of the Royal Society of Arts.

In 2017, she was News International's visiting professor of Media Studies at Brasenose College, Oxford University and in 2018 was given an Honorary Doctorate of Arts by Edge Hill University for her outstanding contributions to the media industry. She holds a degree from the University of Cambridge.

In the 2024 Birthday Honours, Dawn Airey was appointed a Commander of the Order of the British Empire (CBE) for services to theatre and to charity.

== Personal life ==
Airey lives with her civil partner Jacqueline Lawrence (the founder and chairwoman of The Elma Trust, a non-profit organisation) in West London and Oxford. The couple have two daughters.

She describes herself as a monarchist and a supporter of “the modern royal family”, singling out the work ethic and "phenomenal" dedication to the arts of Prince Edward, Duke of Edinburgh, royal patron of the National Youth Theatre, of which Airey is chair. Her views stand in contrast to her position of two decades ago when she told The Guardian that the concept of the monarchy had become “anachronistic”.

Media offices
Preceded by	Chief Executive: Five TV; October 2000 – April 2003	Succeeded by Jane Lighting
Preceded by Jane Lighting	Chief Executive: Five TV; October 2008 – 2010	Succeeded by
