= Heaton Park Hebrew Congregation =

Orthodox synagogue in North Manchester, England

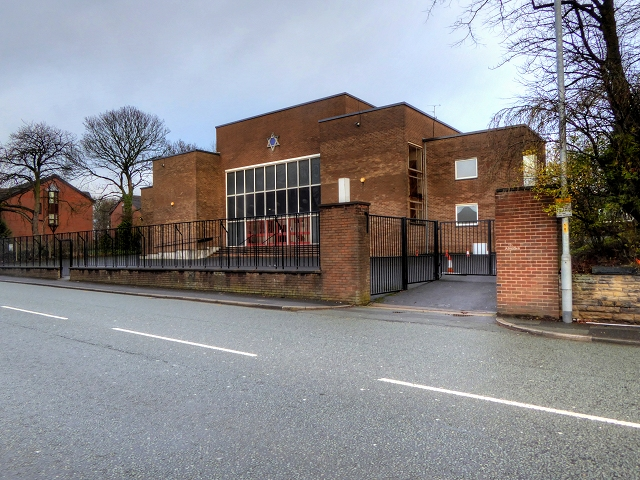
- The synagogue in 2015

- Location of the synagogue in Greater Manchester

Religion
- Affiliation: Orthodox Judaism
- Rite: Nusach Ashkenaz
- Ecclesiastical or organizational status: Synagogue
- Leadership: Rabbi Daniel Walker
- Status: Active

Location
- Location: Middleton Road, Higher Crumpsall, North Manchester, England, M8 4JX
- Country: United Kingdom
- Interactive map of Heaton Park Hebrew Congregation
- Coordinates: 53°31′12″N 2°14′54″W

Architecture
- Type: Synagogue architecture
- Style: International
- Established: 1935 (as a congregation)
- Completed: 1967
- Materials: Red brick

Website
- hphc.org.uk

Heaton Park Hebrew Congregation is an Orthodox Jewish congregation and synagogue, located on Middleton Road, Higher Crumpsall, North Manchester, England. The congregation was founded in 1935 and worships in the Ashkenazi rite. The synagogue building was completed in 1967.

== History ==
The Heaton Park Hebrew Congregation was founded in 1935 on Cheetham Hill Road. It moved to its current location in Crumpsall in 1967. By 1999, it had a membership of 550; and in 2010 the congregation had between 500 and 749 members.

The congregation is housed in a 1967 red brick postwar building on Middleton Road, Crumpsall. The building has been described, unadmiringly, as having a "central block with projecting wings" and "a disproportionately large glass entrance wall". The building is one of three synagogues in the Manchester area that were modelled on the 1934 building of Manchester's Holy Law Synagogue with its tripartite facade in a "pleasing International style". The other two are the Manchester Reform Synagogue's former building (now demolished) at Jackson's Row, and the Prestwich Hebrew Congregation's building.

== October 2025 attack ==
During Yom Kippur services on 2 October 2025, a car-ramming and stabbing attack outside the synagogue left three people dead, including the attacker, and three seriously injured. Armed police responded within about seven minutes, shooting dead the attacker and (accidentally) a worshipper. King Charles visited the synagogue later that month, where he spoke to members about their experiences and paid his respects to the victims.

== Clergy ==
Rabbi Gershon Wulwick was appointed minister, reader and secretary to the Heaton Park Synagogue, Manchester in 1948 until his death in August 1972. Reverend Leslie Olsberg led the congregation for 35 years until he retired and his death, both in 2008. Rabbi Daniel Walker has served the congregation since 2008.

== See also ==
- History of the Jews in England
- List of Jewish communities in the United Kingdom
- List of synagogues in the United Kingdom
