= Sarah Yelf =

Teacher training college principal in UK

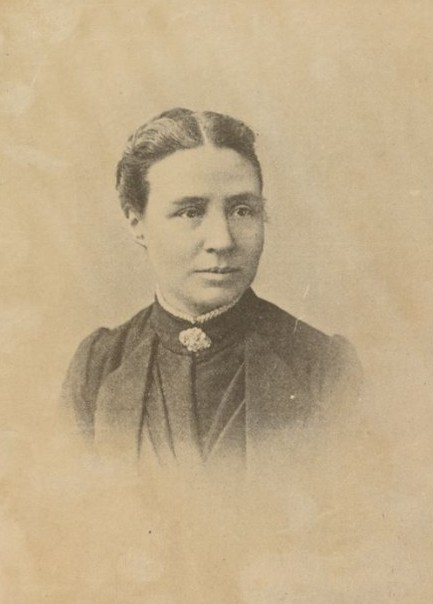
Sarah Yelf, in around 1885

Sarah Yelf was the first principal of Edge Hill College, the first non-denominational teacher training college in England or Wales, located in Liverpool.

== Career ==
During 1861 and 1862, Sarah Yelf trained as a teacher at Salisbury Diocesan Training College and then became headmistress of Teddington Church School for three years. She then moved to Salisbury College as second mistress from 1865 until 1876. She became Inspectress of the Liverpool Board Schools and Principal of the Liverpool Pupil Teachers Centre for Girls in 1876.

There was a need to increase the number of trained teachers for elementary schools in the United Kingdom after the Elementary Education Act 1870. Most teacher training colleges had been founded by the Anglican Church, and gave preference to applications for study from young people of that denomination. This led to a group of Liverpool philanthropists and businessmen planning a non-denominational residential teaching training college for women that became called Edge Hill College. It was formally opened in January 1885 with 41 women students. Yelf had approached them about the position as Principal and was appointed with a yearly salary of £200. This was before women's colleges were required to have a woman as principal. Under her direction the academic standards of the new teacher training college was ranked fifth in the country.

Yelf retired due to ill health in 1890, aged 44. She died aged 83.

One of the student halls of residence at (now) Edge Hill University is named Sarah Yelf Hall after her.
