= Sarah Jane Hale =

English teacher trainer (1851–1920)

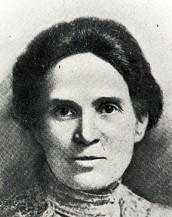
- Sarah Jane Hale
- Born: 1851; Burton Latimer, Northamptonshire
- Died: 1920 (aged 68–69); Edge Hill College, Liverpool
- Occupations: teacher and college principal
- Known for: Principal, Edge Hill College

Sarah Jane Hale (1851–1920) was an English educator most remembered for her 30 years as principal of Edge Hill teacher training college.

== Early life and education ==
She was born 15 February 1851 in Burton Latimer, Northamptonshire, the younger daughter of grocer John Hale. She became a pupil-teacher at Freeman's Endowed School, Wellingborough. In 1870, she gained a Queen’s Scholarship to study at Whitelands College, Chelsea.

Her education continued in 1885, after she had been headmistress of three elementary schools. At the first of these she met Matthew Arnold, the poet and inspector of schools. She then spent eight years as the first headmistress of St Katherine’s College, Tottenham, when she resigned in order to study mental and moral science at Newnham College, Cambridge. She was awarded a third class degree.

== Edge Hill ==
After a brief stint as method mistress at St Mary’s Hall, Cheltenham, Hale was proposed as principal of Edge Hill Training College, Liverpool, after the retirement of the college's founding principal, Sarah Yelf. She was appointed at an annual salary of £250 in 1890. She oversaw changes to the college curriculum, which already taught an extensive range of subjects so that the students could go on to teach everything at secondary school. More subjects were added, such as mechanics, botany, mathematics, physics and physiography. A few non-residential students were allowed from 1892 (until 1933). Starting in 1894, some students were allowed to take degrees awarded by, initially, University of London and later by Victoria University (Manchester) and University of Liverpool. The degree was in addition to a professional teaching certificate. This aided recruitment. In 1902 an inspection report said that the college was one of the most successful for examination success, professional training and diligence of the students. The college magazine quoted from it 'The influence of the Principal is felt throughout'.

Under her headship (1890–1920), the College added a new wing by 1903 including two laboratories, a library, three classrooms, two dormitories and a gymnasium. Provision of residential accommodation limited the number of students, but the number expanded to 160 with this extra accommodation. From 1904, teacher training colleges were allowed to design their own curriculum, subject to external approval, rather than content being prescribed by a central Board of Education. Hale led expansion in the number of subjects provided by the college. This was followed by changes by the government in the entrance examinations for teacher training colleges that increased the number of eligible applicants, as well as of colleges and trained teachers. Hale considered that this would lower standards and lead to unemployment. Laws about education allowed untrained teachers, on lower salaries, to be employed. Her views were supported since in earlier years all the graduates from Edge Hill found employment, but by 1909 almost half (30 /76) left without employment. Once the First World War started, all found employment.

During Hale's tenure, the college trained 2,071 women including 213 headmistresses and 30 science mistresses.

Hale had an interest in theatre, and the college used the performative arts for charity fundraising and to entertain visiting soldiers.

Hale died of pneumonia at the college on 1 April 1920, four months before her planned retirement.
