= South Yorkshire Police =

English territorial police force

- Abbreviation: SYP
- Motto: Justice with courage

Agency overview
- Formed: 1974; 52 years ago
- Preceding agencies: Sheffield and Rotherham Constabulary; Parts of West Yorkshire Constabulary – Barnsley Borough Police and Doncaster Borough Police
- Annual budget: £251 million (2012–13)

Jurisdictional structure
- Operations jurisdiction: South Yorkshire, England
- Map of South Yorkshire Police's jurisdiction
- Area: 1,554 square kilometres (600 sq mi)
- Population: 1.28 million
- Governing body: Home Office
- Constituting instrument: Police Act 1996
- General nature: Local civilian police

Operational structure
- Overseen by: His Majesty's Inspectorate of Constabulary and Fire & Rescue Services; Independent Office for Police Conduct
- Headquarters: Sheffield
- Sworn members: 2,710 (As of August 2013)
- Unsworn members: 2,218 (As of August 2013)
- Mayor responsible: Oliver Coppard
- Agency executives: Lauren Poultney, Chief constable; Tim Forber, Temporary deputy chief constable; Dave Hartley, Assistant chief constable; Sarah Poolman, Acting assistant chief constable
- Districts: 4: Barnsley; Doncaster; Rotherham; Sheffield

Facilities
- Stations: 24
- Custody Suites: 3
- Vehicle Fleets: 500 +
- Dogs: 15
- Horses: 9

Website
- www.southyorkshire.police.uk

South Yorkshire Police (SYP) is the territorial police force responsible for policing South Yorkshire in England. The force is led by Chief Constable Lauren Poultney. Oversight is conducted by Mayor Oliver Coppard.

== History ==
The force was formed in 1974, as a merger of the previous Sheffield and Rotherham Constabulary along with part of the West Yorkshire Constabulary area (which Barnsley Borough Police and Doncaster Borough Police had been merged into on 1 October 1968).

The force's roads policing unit and its helicopter, Sierra Yankee 99, have been a feature in three television series: Traffic Cops, Sky Cops and Police Interceptors. The helicopter unit was subsequently taken over by the National Police Air Service (NPAS), and closed down.

=== Chief constables ===
Chief constables of South Yorkshire Police
Period of service	Name
1974–1979	Sir Richard Barratt
1979–1983	James Hilton Brownlow
1983–1990	Peter Wright
1990–1998	Richard Wells
1998–2004	Mike Hedges
2004–2011	Meredydd Hughes
2011–2012	Robert Dyson (temporary)
2012–2016	David Crompton
2016–2021	Stephen Watson
2021–present	Lauren Poultney

=== Roll of honour ===
The Police Roll of Honour Trust and Police Memorial Trust list and commemorate all British police officers killed in the line of duty. Since its establishment in 1984, the Police Memorial Trust has erected 50 memorials nationally to some of those officers.

South Yorkshire Police does a yearly memorial which consists of both officers, staff, volunteers and other members of the "policing family" to remember lives lost on duty and in service.

The list below shows sworn police officers who have died whilst on duty:

Name	Rank	Organisation	Date	Cause of death
Alfred Austwick	Police constable	West Riding of Yorkshire Constabulary	1 August 1886 (aged 30)	Shot and fatally wounded by a man he had warned about his conduct
William Beardshaw	Police constable	Sheffield Borough Police	23 July 1855 (aged 26)	Struck on head by a stone during a street disturbance and died next day
Arthur Tyler Bull	Special constable	Rotherham Borough Police	2 October 1916 (aged 46)	Collapsed of heart failure while on duty in the early hours
Archie Cornish	Inspector	Sheffield Police Fire Brigade	18 February 1931 (aged 47)	Burns sustained fighting a fire at a hospital in November 1930
Sandra Jane Edwards	Woman police constable	South Yorkshire Police	10 May 1995 (aged 28)	Traffic car crashed while pursuing a stolen car
Dave Fields	Police constable	South Yorkshire Police	25 December 2017 (aged 45)	Traffic car crashed while responding to an incident
Samuel Pidd Gibson	Police constable	Sheffield Borough Police	24 February 1872 (aged 33)	A fractured skull received during an arrest in a hostile crowd
Harold Grainger	Police constable	South Yorkshire Police	26 October 1974 (aged 35)	Police vehicle accident while on prisoner escort to Paisley
Glen Howe	Police constable	South Yorkshire Police	24 October 2008 (aged 48)	Police motorcycle accident attending an emergency in Sheffield
Matt Lannie	Police constable	South Yorkshire Police	21 April 2020 (aged 40)	Police motorcycle accident in Sheffield while responding to a vehicle failing to stop
Thomas Andrew Jackson	Police constable	South Yorkshire Police	13 December 2003 (aged 46)	Collapsed dispersing rival football crowds with his police dog
William Jackson	Sergeant	Sheffield City Police	26 November 1914 (aged 41)	Accidentally killed by a train while crossing the line on patrol at night
John William Kew	Police constable	West Riding of Yorkshire Constabulary	11 July 1900 (aged 29)	Fatally shot challenging two armed suspects who had threatened him
Harry Marriott	Police constable	Sheffield City Police	8 June 1961 (aged 31)	Accidental collision with a van while on motorcycle patrol
Lot Moor	Police constable	West Riding of Yorkshire Constabulary	16 June 1900 (aged 58)	Found dead on his beat in the early morning believed from heart failure
Frank Hides Munks	Police war reserve constable	Sheffield City Police	13 December 1940 (aged 52)	Enemy air raid
John Pollard	Chief constable	Rotherham Borough Police	30 June 1888 (aged 41)	Collapsed while running to the scene of a fire late at night
Edwin Pryor	Police constable	Sheffield Borough Police	8 April 1857	Struck on head by a stone during a street disturbance and died next day
Rex Webster Robinson	Sergeant	Doncaster Borough Police	9 December 1961 (aged 52)	Collapsed while briefing traffic officers on shift changeover
Gina Corin Rutherford	Woman police constable	South Yorkshire Police	7 February 1994 (aged 25)	Drowned in a patrol car which left an icy road and crashed into a river
Barry Saunders	Police constable	South Yorkshire Police	24 November 1989 (aged 31)	Fell through a roof while checking burgled factory premises
James Slee	Police constable	Sheffield City Police	September 1940 (aged 30)	Road accident on patrol in a police motorcycle combination
Kenneth South	Police constable	Sheffield City Police	30 March 1960 (aged 25)	Motorcycle accident after finishing an extended tour of duty
Frederick Parkes Spencer	Police fireman	Sheffield Police Fire Brigade	12 December 1940 (aged 36)	Killed fighting a fire at the Empire Theatre after an enemy air raid
George William Watson	Inspector	West Riding of Yorkshire Constabulary	5 November 1953 (aged 48)	Collapsed soon after leading a police funeral escort

=== Notable incidents and investigations ===
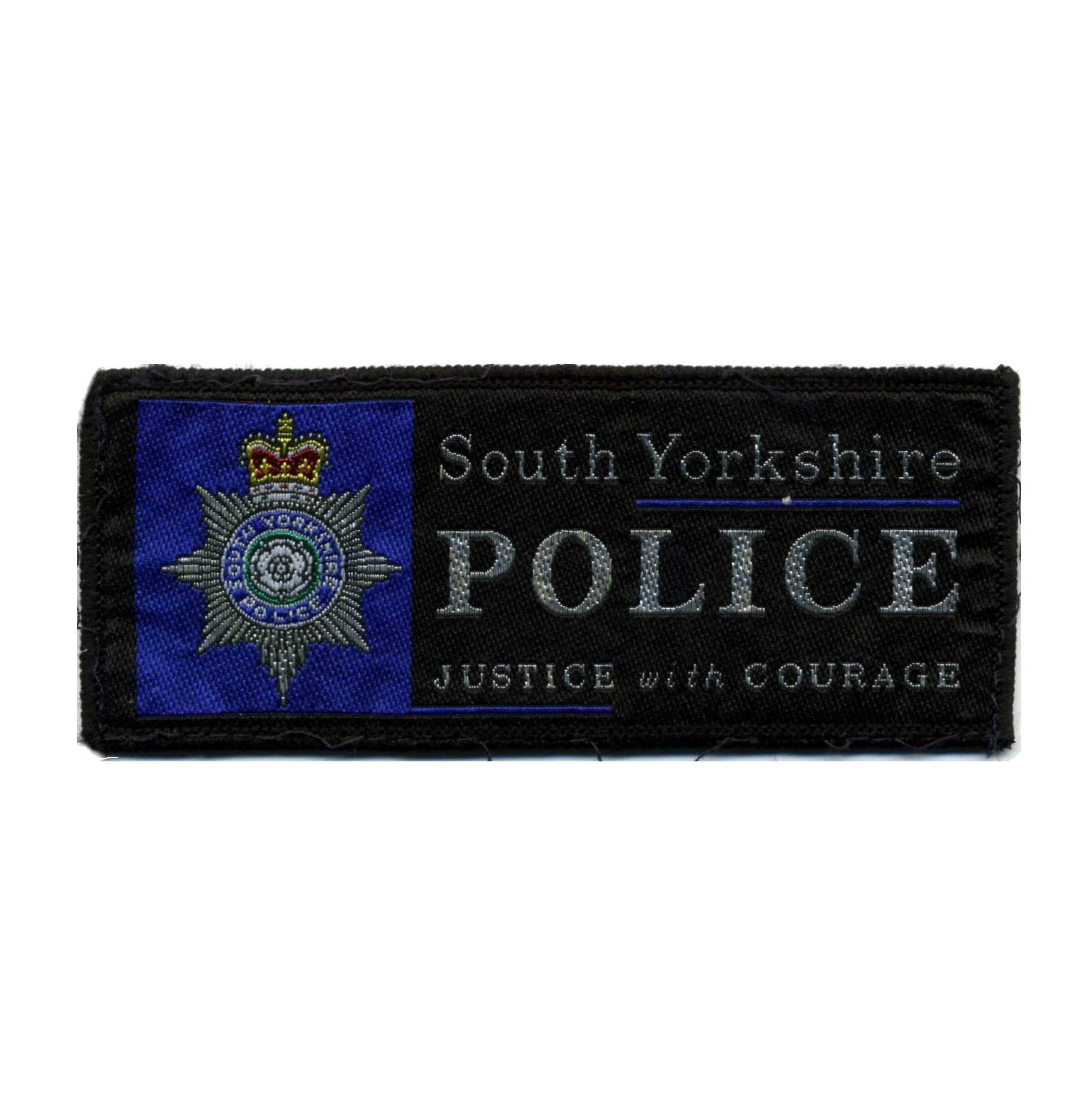
South Yorkshire Police Patch

The force has received national attention for the unlawful killing of over 90 people in the Hillsborough Disaster, and the failure to investigate of child sex abuse in the Rotherham scandal in the 2000s.

==== Conduct in the 1984 miners' strike ====
During the 1984 miners' strike, officers from South Yorkshire attacked striking miners then arrested 95 on the charge of rioting. It was found the Police Force had fabricated evidence, carried out false arrest and assaulted miners. No police officer has ever been disciplined or accepted responsibility for their actions. Ex officer Tony Munday has called for an inquiry into how South Yorkshire Police handled the aftermath of the Battle of Orgreave claiming he was told what to put in his statement "by a senior South Yorkshire detective" after he arrested a miner during the Orgreave confrontation. "I've never before or since, while I've been a police officer, been involved where effectively chunks of a statement were dictated. They weren't my words." A public inquiry into the Battle of Orgreave was announced by Home Secretary Yvette Cooper on 21 July 2025, with South Yorkshire Police stating it will "fully cooperate" with the inquiry.

==== Hillsborough disaster ====
The force was condemned by Prime Minister David Cameron in September 2012 for their dishonesty and gross negligence in their handling of the Hillsborough disaster in 1989, which led to an apology from the then Chief Constable David Crompton. The Hillsborough Independent Panel had exposed the way in which the force had attempted to divert blame from their own mishandling of the tragedy by feeding false information to the media and altering statements given by their own officers. In June 2013, UK newspaper The Guardian reported on emails sent by Crompton in which he had suggested that the families of fans killed at the Hillsborough disaster had been untruthful. In one, Crompton had written: "One thing is certain – the Hillsborough Campaign for Justice will be doing their version … in fact their version of certain events has become 'the truth' even though it isn't!! I just have the feeling that the media 'machine' favours the families and not us, so we need to be a bit more innovative in our response to have a fighting chance otherwise we will just be roadkill."

On 27 April 2016, it was reported that the force's Chief Constable David Crompton was to be suspended following statements made by South Yorkshire Police after the verdict of the jury in the second Hillsborough disaster inquest. He was temporarily replaced by Deputy Chief Constable Dawn Copley, but the following day it was announced that she herself would be stepping down "in the interests of the force and the workforce" after an investigation into her conduct whilst serving as Assistant Chief Constable at Greater Manchester Police was reported.

==== Rotherham child sexual exploitation scandal ====
The force's judgement has been called into question over a number of incidents in the Rotherham child sexual exploitation scandal, where prosecutions were not undertaken.

In January 2020, the Independent Office for Police Conduct found that South Yorkshire Police had taken insufficient action to protect from harm a child, who had been sexually abused and exploited by Asian men for several years from 2003 onwards. An unnamed chief inspector had told the investigation that the force had been aware of similar abuse for 30 years but had ignored it for fear of increasing racial tensions. In July 2020 the Independent Office of Police Conduct again considered the force's response in relation to the death of Amy-Leanne Stringfellow.

==== Other incidents ====
In May 2016, it was reported that two serving police officers, a pilot serving with the National Police Air Service and two retired police officers who crewed the South Yorkshire Police helicopter were to stand trial accused of misusing the camera on the SY Police helicopter to film people who were naked or having sex. Four of the men denied charges of misconduct in a public office and were due to stand trial at Sheffield Crown Court on 17 July 2017. A fifth man did not appear at the hearing. All of the men apart from the fifth were found not guilty of any offence by a jury – he had previously admitted four charges of misconduct in a public office.

== Police area ==
The police force covers an area of approximately 600 square miles (1,554 square kilometres) which is made up of the county's three boroughs (Barnsley, Doncaster and Rotherham) along with the City of Sheffield. The resident population is 1.2 million.

The force is divided into four basic command units (BCUs):

- Barnsley
- Doncaster
- Rotherham
- Sheffield

Force headquarters is at Carbrook House, in Tinsley, Sheffield, following a move from Snig Hill police station in early 2013. This move saw the senior command team and other services (such as firearms licensing) move into one location, funded by the sale of outdated buildings, including West Bar police station, and the future sale of vacated properties.

== Fleet ==
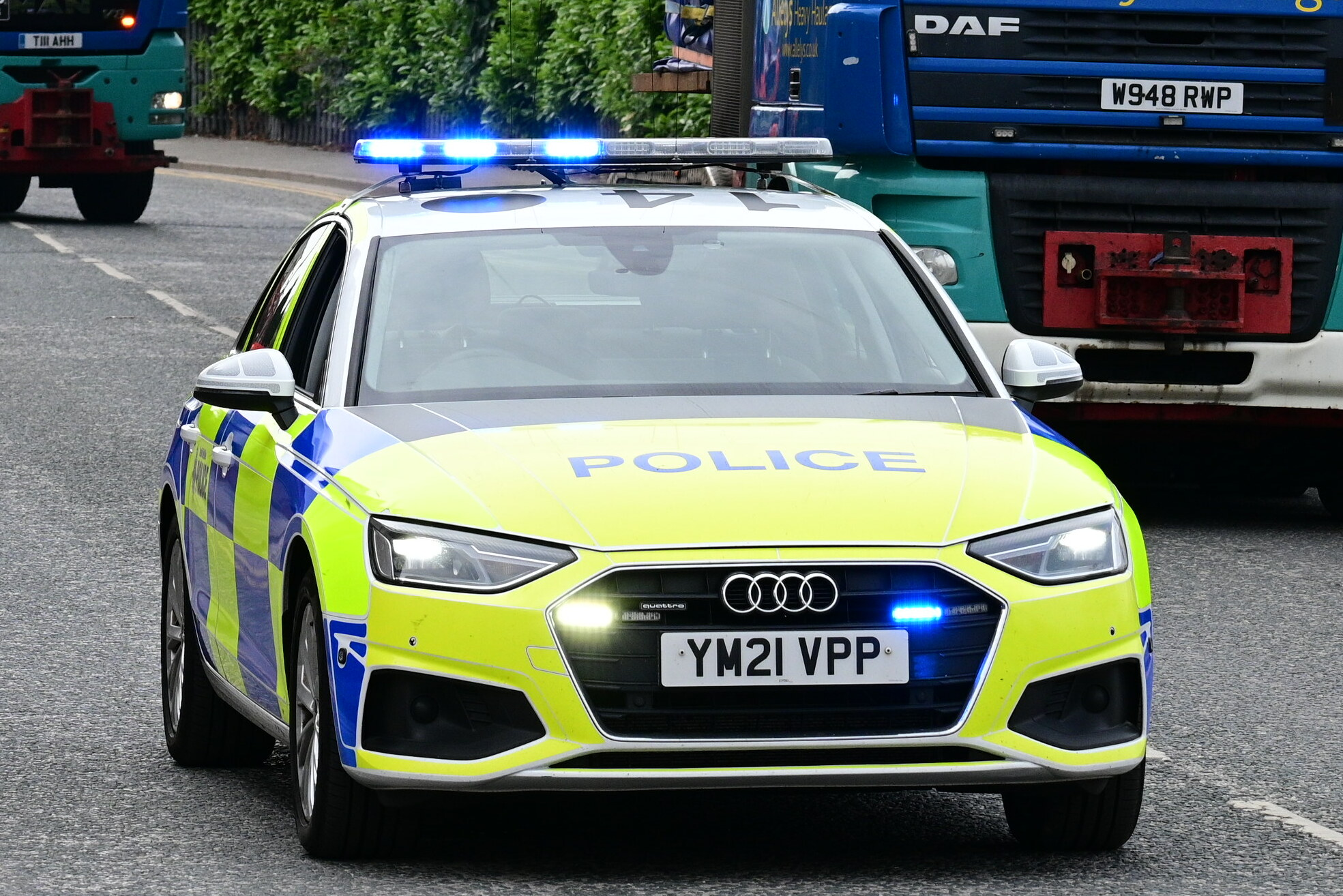
South Yorkshire Police traffic car pictured in 2023

South Yorkshire Police is one of a number of police forces in the United Kingdom to merge its vehicle maintenance operations with their area fire service, merging maintenance operations with the South Yorkshire Fire and Rescue Service in June 2018. Joint maintenance operations are based at a workshop in Rotherham, which opened in late 2020.

== Management ==
The chief constable since May 2021 is Lauren Poultney. She replaced Stephen Watson, who left South Yorkshire Police to take over as chief constable of Greater Manchester Police. Watson replaced Dawn Copley, the former deputy chief constable, who stood down a day after assuming the acting chief constable post due to 'her conduct at a previous force being investigated'. Copley assumed the post after David Crompton was suspended regarding comments made about the Hillsborough disaster.

== Governance ==
South Yorkshire Police is governed by the Mayor of South Yorkshire. The incumbent mayor is Oliver Coppard, who was re-elected in 2024. The mayor is overseen by the police and crime panel.

Before November 2012, police governance was undertaken by the South Yorkshire Police Authority, made up of elected councillors from the four metropolitan boroughs. In that month it was transferred to the South Yorkshire Police and Crime Commissioner and then the PCC's responsibilities were merged into the mayor's role in May 2024.

== See also ==
- List of law enforcement agencies in the United Kingdom, Crown Dependencies and British Overseas Territories
- Law enforcement in the United Kingdom
