= Social Democratic Party (UK, 1990–present) election results =

This article lists the election results of the Social Democratic Party (SDP) in UK elections. The party was founded following the 1990 dissolution of the "Continuing" Social Democratic Party, which in turn had been founded following the dissolution in 1988 of the original Social Democratic Party.

== Local government elections ==
=== Summary Performance ===
Election	Seats	Net ±	Gains	Losses	Candidates	Total Votes	Votes per Candidate	Notes
1990	39	▲2	▲6	▼4	219	79,019	360.8	"Continuing SDP" candidates, some of which joined or later stood for the new party. *Results in England, Wales and London.
1991*	36	▼3	▲6	▼9	66	38,332	580.8	First local elections as the 'New' (post-1990 dissolution) SDP. *Results in England and Wales only.
1992	35	▼1	▲2	▼3	27			
1993	24	▼11	▲1	▼12	12			
1994	22	▼2	Steady	▼2	13	7,337	564.4	
1995	13	▼9	▲2	▼11	29			
1996	11	▼2	Steady	▼2	3	855	285	
1997	11	Steady	Steady	Steady	1	820	820	
1998	7	▼4	Steady	▼4	1	274	274	
1999	7	Steady	▲4	▼4	9	7,042	782.4	
2000	7	Steady	Steady	Steady	0			Did not stand candidates.
2001	7	Steady	Steady	Steady	0			Did not stand candidates.
2002	7	Steady	Steady	Steady	0			Did not stand candidates.
2003	6	▼1	Steady	▼1	9	4,782	531.3	Loss of one seat in Tunstall.
2004	6	Steady	Steady	Steady	3	2,655	885	
2005	5	Steady	Steady	▼1	1	906	906	Loss of final seat in Tunstall.
2006	5	Steady	Steady	Steady	0			Did not stand candidates.
2007	4	▼1	Steady	▼1	5	3,453	691	Loss of one seat and one held in Bridlington Central.
2008	4	Steady	Steady	Steady	4	2,778	694.5	All three seats in Aberavon, Wales are held.
2009	4	Steady	Steady	Steady	0			
2010	4	Steady	Steady	Steady	4	294	73.5	
2011	4	Steady	Steady	Steady	6	1,875	312.5	
2012	2	▼2	Steady	▼2	11	2,429	220.8	Loss of two seats and one held in Aberavon, Wales.
2013	2	Steady	Steady	Steady	0			Did not stand candidates.
2014	1	▼1	Steady	▼1	0			Bridlington Central By-Election Loss.
2015	2	▲1	▲1*	Steady	0			*Mike Sheridan (Green) defection to the SDP in Solihull.
2016	1	▼1	Steady	▼1	5	118	23.6	Mike Sheridan loses his seat in Solihull.
2017	0	▼1	Steady	▼1	3	112	37.3	Loss of final seat in Aberavon, Wales.
2018	0	Steady	Steady	Steady	3	1,406	468.6	
2019	0	Steady	Steady	Steady	9	2,038	226.4	
2021	0	Steady	Steady	Steady	68	6,207	91.28	
2022	2	▲2	▲2*	Steady	30	5,208	173.6	Wayne Dixon wins the party's first seat in Leeds since 1988. *Richard Bright (Conservative) defects to the SDP in Hulland.
2023	2	▲1	▲1	▼1	36	5,163	143.3	Emma Pogson-Golden wins second seat in Leeds. Richard Bright loses his seat.
2024	3	▲1	▲1	Steady	28	4,527	161.7	Rob Chesterfield wins third seat in Leeds.
2025	3	Steady	Steady	Steady	11	717	65.18	
2026	3	Steady	Steady	Steady	48	5,014	104.5	Wayne Dixon retains his seat in Middleton Park, Leeds.

=== 1994 ===
Authority	Ward	Candidate	Votes	Percentage
Bromley	Martins Hill & Town	McCabe M.	88	2.7%
Bromley	West Wickham South	Redden R.	302	7.8%
Greenwich	Abbey Wood	Lewis D.*	1,569	29.9%
Greenwich	Abbey Wood	Malone T.*	1,528	29.1%
Greenwich	Eynsham	Rastall J.	1,239	29.9%
Greenwich	Eynsham	Groves B.	1,205	29.1%
Westminster	Hamilton Terrace	Aveline J.	89	5.7%
Birmingham	Hodge Hill	Ware A.	131	1.8%
Derby	Littleover	Dickenson K.	57	1.4%
Epping Forest	Buckhurst Hill East	Hobbs E. Ms.	76	3.9%
Epping Forest	Buckhurst Hill West	Arnold R.	35	1.5%
Port Talbot	Aberavon	Price J. Ms.	917	49.2%

=== 1995 ===
Authority	Ward	Candidate	Votes	Percentage
Neath & Port Talbot	Aberavon	Anthony Taylor	1,080	20.1%
Neath & Port Talbot	Aberavon	Jeffery Dinham	889	16.5%
Neath & Port Talbot	Aberavon	Thomas John Sullivan	765	14.2%

=== 1999 ===
Authority	Ward	Candidate	Votes	Percentage
Neath & Port Talbot	Aberavon	Anthony Taylor*	1,191	24.3%
Neath & Port Talbot	Aberavon	Jeffery Dinham	973	19.8%
Neath & Port Talbot	Aberavon	Thomas John Sullivan	852	17.4%

=== 2004 ===
Authority	Ward	Candidate	Votes	Percentage
Neath Port Talbot	Aberavon	Anthony Taylor*	1,018	24.2%
Neath Port Talbot	Aberavon	Thomas John Sullivan*	822	19.6%
Neath Port Talbot	Aberavon	Jeffrey Dinham*	815	19.4%

=== 2007 ===
Authority	Ward	Candidate	Votes	Percentage
East Riding of Yorkshire	Bridlington Central and Old Town	Raymond Allerston	1,404	31.2%
East Riding of Yorkshire	Bridlington Central and Old Town	Les Taylor	709	15.8%
East Riding of Yorkshire	Bridlington South	Liam Dealtry	632	7.6%
East Riding of Yorkshire	Bridlington South	David Metcalf	389	4.7%
East Riding of Yorkshire	Bridlington South	Phillip Wray	319	3.8%

=== 2008 ===
Authority	Ward	Candidate	Votes	Percentage
Neath & Port Talbot	Aberavon	Anthony Taylor*	893	25.7%
Neath & Port Talbot	Aberavon	Jeffery Dinham*	755	21.7%
Neath & Port Talbot	Aberavon	Thomas John Sullivan*	730	21.0%

=== 2012 ===
Authority	Ward	Candidate	Votes	Percentage
Neath & Port Talbot	Aberavon	Anthony Taylor*	702	17.1%
Neath & Port Talbot	Aberavon	Thomas John Sullivan*	556	13.6%
Neath & Port Talbot	Aberavon	Jeffery Dinham*	550	13.4%

=== 2017 ===
Authority	Ward	Candidate	Votes	Percentage
Aberdeenshire	North Kincardine	David Lansdell	48	0.9%
East Renfrewshire	Newton Means North and Neilston	Robert Malyn	13	0.2%
Glasgow	Shettleston	Steven Marshall	51	0.7%

=== 2018 ===
Authority	Ward	Candidate	Votes	Percentage
Gateshead	Saltwell	Darren Thompson	44	2.4%
Leeds	Middleton Park	Wayne Dixon	1,232	10.5%
Salford	Swinton South	Joe O'Neill	130	5.9%

=== 2019 ===
Authority	Ward	Candidate	Votes	Percentage
Eastbourne	Old Town	Sally Kitchen	199	1.9%
Leeds	Ardsley and Robin Hood	Daniel Whetstone	28	0.6%
Leeds	Cross Gates and Whinmoor	David Creasser	58	1.2%
Leeds	Gipton and Harehills	Shaff Sheikh	108	2.4%
Leeds	Middleton Park	Wayne Dixon	1,027	23.6%
Mole Valley	Holmwoods	Pip English	32	1.3%
Peterborough	Eye, Thorney and Newborough	Mary Herdman	187	7.9%
South Derbyshire	Seales	Sue Ward	251	11.0%
Tandridge	Oxted South	Helena Forsythe	148	7.3%

=== 2021 ===
Authority	Ward	Candidate	Votes	Percentage
Barnsley	Dearne North	Savannah Jarvis	47	2.7%
Barnsley	Dearne South	David Jarvis	359	15.8%
Barnsley	St. Helens	Steve Vajda	38	2.2%
Barnsley	Wombwell	Rachel Thompson	17	0.7%
Bradford	Keighley East	Alexander Vann	9	0.2%
Bradford	Keighley West	Alexander Taylor	50	1.3%
Bristol, City Of	Frome Vale	Tommy Trueman	112	2.9%
Buckinghamshire	Stone And Waddesdon	Paul Tinay	37	0.9%
Burnley	Whittlefield With Ightenhill	Mitchell Cryer	21	1.2%
Calderdale	Illingworth And Mixenden	Martin Roberts	15	0.5%
Doncaster	Sprotbrough	Laura McHardy	100	3.0%
Dudley	Gornal	Stuart Turner	71	2.1%
Gloucester	Abbeymead	Sadia Hameed	32	1.8%
Hartlepool	Burn Valley	Lynne Humphries	225	7.0%
Hinckley And Bosworth	Burbage	Roger Hill	29	0.7%
Hinckley And Bosworth	St Marys	Paul Forrest	18	0.7%
Kingston Upon Hull	Drypool	John Waterston	8	0.3%
Kingston Upon Hull	Kingswood	Helen Jackman	11	0.8%
Kingston Upon Hull	West Carr	Lauren Vargues	26	1.2%
Kirklees	Almondbury	John Whittaker	23	0.5%
Knowsley	St Gabriels	Patricia Jameson	61	3.7%
Leeds	Ardsley And Robin Hood	David Creasser	71	1.1%
Leeds	Armley	Andrew Martin	43	0.9%
Leeds	Bramley And Stanningley	Daniel Whetstone	40	0.8%
Leeds	Chapel Allerton	Richard Cowles	55	0.8%
Leeds	Cross Gates And Whinmoor	Jack Newcombe	21	0.3%
Leeds	Gipton And Harehills	Shaff Sheikh	113	2.2%
Leeds	Headingley And Hyde Park	Michael Bellfield	10	0.2%
Leeds	Hunslet And Riverside	Cordelia Lynan	43	0.8%
Leeds	Killingbeck And Seacroft	Hafizur Rahman	32	0.7%
Leeds	Kippax And Methley	Thomas Foster	22	0.3%
Leeds	Middleton Park	Wayne Dixon	1,963	35.0%
Leeds	Moortown	Steve Wright	74	0.9%
Leeds	Morley North	Nigel Perry	33	0.5%
Leeds	Morley South	Joshua Sturgeon	104	1.6%
Leeds	Pudsey	Daniel Walker	15	0.2%
Leeds	Rothwell	Christopher Dudley	16	0.2%
Leeds	Roundhay	Max Partington	106	1.2%
Leeds	Roundhay	Paul Whetstone	30	0.3%
Liverpool	Central	Keenan Clough	51	2.4%
Manchester	Didsbury West	Wendy Andrew	29	0.5%
Mole Valley	Westcott	Stuart Hunt	8	0.9%
North East Lincolnshire	Yarborough	Tim Mellors	21	1.1%
North Hertfordshire	Letchworth South West	Michael McGetrick	39	1.4%
Northumberland	Corbridge	Tom Maskell	116	7.1%
Northumberland	South Blyth	Liam Rogerson	29	1.9%
Northumberland	Wooler	Stephen Crane	61	3.8%
Reading	Caversham	Damian Skelton	17	0.5%
Rochdale	East Middleton	Robert Mudd	71	2.9%
Rotherham	Kilnhurst And Swinton East	Karly Buffon	103	5.3%
Rotherham	Kilnhurst And Swinton East	David Taylor	84	4.3%
Rotherham	Swinton Rockingham	Duran Bath	59	2.9%
Rotherham	Swinton Rockingham	Toni Garnett	50	2.5%
Rotherham	Wath	Micky Newman	261	14.4%
Rotherham	Wath	Wayne Pike	110	6.1%
Sheffield	Ecclesall	Andrew Cowell	86	1.0%
South Oxfordshire	Benson And Cholsey	Maryse Pomlett	74	2.0%
South Tyneside	Hebburn South	Mark Conway	354	14.7%
St Helens	Town Centre	Glynn Jones	40	2.5%
Stratford-On-Avon	Wellesbourne	Timothy Griffiths	40	1.1%
Thanet	Cliftonville	Josh Sims	23	0.5%
Warwick	Kenilworth St John's	Wayne Harris	57	1.5%
Warwick	Leamington Brunswick	Dhesh Chehal	21	0.8%
Warwick	Warwick North	Josh Payne	105	3.7%
Warwick	Warwick South	Christopher Burr	34	1.0%
Wealden	Hailsham Market	Steven Gander	103	4.1%
Worcester	Warndon Parish	Darren Rushby	16	0.6%
Wyre	Wyre Rural East	Jonathan Binnie	45	0.9%

=== 2022 ===
Authority	Ward	Candidate	Votes	Percentage
Amber Valley	Ripley	Edwin George Dale Taylor	21	0.9%
Barnsley	Darfield	Scott McKenzie	208	10.5%
Barnsley	Dearne North	Savannah Paige Jarvis	39	2.5%
Barnsley	Dearne South	David Allan Jarvis	115	6.2%
Barnsley	Kingstone	Steve Vajda	32	1.9%
Barnsley	Wombwell	Jon Seymour	94	4.5%
Bexley	Sidcup	Laurence Williams	100	0.9%
Bradford	Keighley East	Alexander Richard Vann	10	0.2%
Bradford	Shipley	John Wood	25	0.5%
Caerphilly	Pontllanfraith	Jacob Pearce	210	10.6%
Ealing	Pitshanger	Les Beaumont	109	2.2%
Glasgow	Cardonald	Robin John Dudfield	50	0.6%
Hammersmith and Fulham	West Kensington	Simon Marshall	49	2.5%
Hillingdon	Hillingdon East	Steve Gardner	239	7.0%
Islington	Bunhill	Jake Anthony Painter	34	0.5%
Leeds	Ardsley & Robin Hood	Andrew Alexander Martin	105	1.8%
Leeds	Beeston & Holbeck	Nigel Perry	250	5.7%
Leeds	Bramley & Stanningley	Paul Daniel Whestone	36	0.8%
Leeds	Calverley & Farsley	Justin Thomas	14	0.2%
Leeds	Hunslet & Riverside	Thomas Peter Foster	33	0.7%
Leeds	Middleton Park	Wayne Alan Dixon	2,687	50.5%
Leeds	Weetwood	Rob Walker	54	0.8%
Manchester	Didsbury West	Wendy Madeleine Andrew	22	0.4%
North Lanarkshire	Coatbridge North	Jeff McDonald	172	3.5%
North Yorkshire	Derwent Valley & Moor	Kathy Bushell	64	4.2%
Sheffield	Firth Park	April Worrall	255	8.3%
Southwark	Rotherhithe	Andy Kekwick	57	1.7%
Sutton	South Beddington & Roundshaw	Steve Kelleher	33	0.4%
Tower Hamlets	Bromley North	Jon Mabbutt	39	1.1%
Wakefield	Pontefract South	Trevor Lake	52	1.4%

=== 2023 ===
Authority	Ward	Candidate	Votes	Percentage
Amber Valley	Ripley	Edwin George Dale Taylor	69	2.6%
Barnsley	Dearne North	Steve Vajda	16	1.1%
Barnsley	Dearne South	David Allan Jarvis	446	24.9%
Bradford	Keighley East	Alexander Richard Vann	37	1.0%
Cheshire East	Poynton East and Pott Shrigley	Tim O'Rourke	157	3.3%
Derbyshire Dales	Hulland	Richard Bright	145	18.9%
East Yorkshire	Bridlington Central and Old Town	Carlo Verda	228	7.2%
East Yorkshire	Bridlington North	Joy Alexandria Verda	118	1.2%
East Yorkshire	Bridlington South	Chris Daniels	52	1.0%
Kirklees	Birstall and Birkenshaw	Mark Andrew Steele	53	1.4%
Knowsley	St Gabriels	Patricia Jameson	26	1.4%
Leeds	Ardsley & Robin Hood	Paul Daniel Whestone	101	1.9%
Leeds	Beeston & Holbeck	Nigel Perry	107	2.7%
Leeds	Bramley & Stanningley	Richard David Riley	62	1.4%
Leeds	Burmantofts & Richmond Hill	Paul Anthony Whetsone	59	1.5%
Leeds	Chapel Allerton	Sasha Watson	48	0.8%
Leeds	Farnley & Wortley	Michael Bellfield	17	0.3%
Leeds	Hunslet & Riverside	Thomas Peter Foster	48	1.1%
Leeds	Middleton Park	Emma Louise Pogson-Golden	1,985	45.9%
Leeds	Morley North	Richard Cowles	25	0.4%
Leeds	Morley South	Andrew Alexander Martin	41	0.8%
Leeds	Rothwell	Sarah Welbourne	21	0.4%
Leeds	Temple Newsam	Wendy Vivienne Whetstone	61	1.2%
Leeds	Weetwood	Rob Walker	47	0.7%
Manchester	Didsbury West	Wendy Madeleine Andrew	26	0.5%
Medway	Hempstead & Wigmore	Peter Anthony Wheeler	58	2.2%
Medway	Wayfield & Weeds Wood	Steve Tanner	74	3.8%
Newcastle	South Jesmond	Martin Evison	85	4.7%
Salford	Weaste & Seedley	Stephen James Lewthwaite	40	1.8%
Sevenoaks	Sevenoaks Kippington	Ian Grattidge	78	5.0%
Sheffield	Firth Park	April Worrall	183	6.5%
South Kesteven	Toller	Alexander Leslie Mitchell	17	2.4%
South Oxfordshire	Cholsey	Kyn Pomlett	188	6.1%
South Oxfordshire	Didcot South	Owen Edwards	327	12.1%
Wakefield	Pontefract South	Trevor Lake	84	2.5%
Wealden	Hailsham West	Stephen Gander	34	4.3%

=== 2024 ===
Authority	Ward	Candidate	Votes	Percentage
Barnsley	Dearne South	Dave Jarvis	396	22.3%
Bradford	Keighley East	Alex Vann	58	1.0%
Bristol	Frome Vale	Tommy Trueman	188	6.1%
Bristol	Hengrove and Whitchurch Park	Neil Norton	59	1.6%
Dorset	Blandford	Linda Stenner	31	1.3%
Dorset	Blandford	Daniel Avery	50	2.0%
Leeds	Ardsley and Robin Hood	Mark Daniels	102	1.9%
Leeds	Armley	Warwick Bettney	41	0.8%
Leeds	Beeston & Holbeck	Sasha Watson	247	5.2%
Leeds	Bramley & Stanningley	Richard Riley	82	1.9%
Leeds	Burmantofts & Richmond Hill	Paul Whetstone	30	0.7%
Leeds	Chapel Allerton	Richard Cowles	75	1.1%
Leeds	Farnley & Wortley	Finley Taylor	76	1.6%
Leeds	Horsforth	Nathan Wright	41	0.5%
Leeds	Hunslet & Riverside	Daniel Whetstone	107	2.2%
Leeds	Killingbeck & Seacroft	Catherine Dobson	106	2.5%
Leeds	Middleton Park	Rob Chesterfield	1,882	42.8%
Leeds	Moortown	Cordelia Lynan	39	0.5%
Leeds	Morley North	Thomas Foster	19	0.3%
Leeds	Morley South	Nigel Perry	8	0.1%
Leeds	Rothwell	Sarah Welbourne	43	0.8%
Leeds	Roundhay	Carl Richman	132	1.8%
Leeds	Temple Newsam	Wendy Whetstone	33	0.6%
Leeds	Weetwood	Rob Walker	67	1.0%
Leeds	Wetherby	Ian Howell	43	0.6%
Newcastle-upon-Tyne	South Jesmond	Martin Evison	52	2.4%
Rotherham	Wath	Michael Chambers	345	21.6%
Sheffield	Nether Hedge and Sharrow	Annie Stoker	175	5.5%

=== 2025 ===
Authority	Ward	Candidate	Votes	Percentage
Buckinghamshire	Haddenham & Stone	George Millo	85	2.5%
Buckinghamshire	Ridgeway East	Yvonne Dorette Wilding	154	4.9%
Buckinghamshire	Totteridge & Bowerdean	Adam Williams	34	1.2%
County Durham	Chester-le-Street North	Tom Chittenden	83	2.7%
Lincolnshire	Folkingham Rural	Alexander Leslie Mitchell	50	1.6%
Lincolnshire	Louth Wolds	Chris Stephenson	12	0.3%
North Northamptonshire	Desborough	Matthew Murphy	60	1.3%
Northumberland	Cramlington South West	Mathew Wilkinson	46	6.6%
Nottinghamshire	West Bridgford South	Anne McDonnell	25	0.6%
Oxfordshire	Cholsey & The Hagbournes	Kyn Pomlett	90	2.8%
West Northamptonshire	Castle	Adrian Michael Vann	78	3.3%

=== 2026 ===
Authority	Ward	Candidate	Votes	Percentage
Barnsley	Dearne South	Warwick Bettney	70	2.6%
Barnsley	Dearne South	David Allan Jarvis	111	4.1%
Barnsley	Penistone West	Rori Cook	180	3.8%
Bradford	Bingley East	Alexander Richard Vann	42	0.2%
Bradford	Bingley West	Paul Shkurka	70	0.4%
Cherwell	Cropredy, Sibfords & Wroxton	Michael William Patrick Clyne	35	0.9%
Coventry	Earlsdon	Paul Crilly	81	1.2%
Coventry	Earlsdon	Barnie Giltrap	76	1.2%
Coventry	Earlsdon	Michael Anthony Norman Newton	72	1.1%
Ealing	Hanger Hill	Stephen Andrew Balogh	142	1.0%
East Surrey	Dorking	Fred John Tidy	42	0.7%
East Surrey	Esher, Claygate & Oxshott North	Lawrence Anthony Patrick Riley	36	0.6%
Hampshire	Catherington	Ian Robert Cousins	43	0.7%
Hillingdon	Hillingdon East	Steve Gardner	127	2.8%
Islington	Bunhill	Jake Anthony Painter	37	0.5%
Lambeth	Clapham Park	Sandy McDougall	38	0.4%
Leeds	Ardsley & Robin Hood	Sian Gardener	135	1.9%
Leeds	Armley	John Frank Beal	37	0.7%
Leeds	Beeston & Holbeck	Sasha Watson	284	5.0%
Leeds	Bramley & Stanningley	Ian Robert Howell	20	0.3%
Leeds	Burmantofts & Richmond Hill	Paul Daniel Whestone	19	0.4%
Leeds	Chapel Allerton	Richard Cowles	55	0.7%
Leeds	Cross Gates & Whinmoor	Paul Anthony Whetsone	14	0.2%
Leeds	Farnley & Wortley	Richard David Riley	19	0.3%
Leeds	Gipton & Harehills	Andrew Alexander Martin	29	0.5%
Leeds	Horsforth	Catherine Frances Dobson	25	0.3%
Leeds	Hunslet & Riverside	Paul Thomas	57	1.0%
Leeds	Killingbeck & Seacroft	Thomas Peter Foster	50	0.9%
Leeds	Middleton Park	Wayne Alan Dixon*	2,203	38.2%
Leeds	Moortown	Sarah Welbourne	43	0.5%
Leeds	Morley North	Nigel Perry	21	0.1%
Leeds	Morley South	Cordelia Lynan	12	0.2%
Leeds	Rothwell	Mark Daniels	52	0.7%
Leeds	Roundhay	Carl Clements Richman	56	0.6%
Leeds	Temple Newsam	Kimberley Ruth Reid	60	0.5%
Leeds	Temple Newsam	Rajiv Kumar Thukral	49	0.4%
Leeds	Weetwood	Rob Walker	30	0.4%
Manchester	Chorlton Park	Hamed Aden	24	0.4%
Manchester	Deansgate	Connor Sanders	5	0.2%
Manchester	Old Moat	Sebastian Moore	28	0.7%
North East Lincolnshire	Heneage	Chris Stephenson	11	0.5%
North Tyneside	Chirton & Percy Main	Peter John	81	2.9%
Reading	Caversham	Bill Runacre	16	0.4%
Reading	Thames	James Halls	13	0.5%
Trafford	Sale Central	Hilary Salt	145	3.7%
Wakefield	Ossett	Christine Ellis	151	2.9%
Wakefield	Wakefield Rural	Damien Paul Sharpe	60	1.0%
Wigan	Leigh South	Neil Andrew Gordon	8	0.2%

== General elections ==
=== Summary Performance ===
Election	Seats	±	Candidates	Total votes	%	Votes per candidate	Government
1992	0 / 651	Steady	8	6,649	0.1%	831	No seats
1997	0 / 659	Steady	2	1,246	0.0%	623	No seats
2010	0 / 650	Steady	2	1,551	0.0%	776	No seats
2015	0 / 650	Steady	2	125	0.0%	63	No seats
2017	0 / 650	Steady	6	469	0.0%	78	No seats
2019	0 / 650	Steady	20	3,295	0.0%	165	No seats
2024	0 / 650	Steady	122	33,811	0.1%	277	No seats

=== 1992 ===
Constituency	Candidate	Votes
Glanford & Scunthorpe	Cyril Nottingham	996 out of 58,045 (1.7%)
Plymouth Devonport	Harold Luscombe	2,152 out of 51,216 (4.2%)
Plymouth Drake	D. M. Stanbury	476 out of 39,042 (0.2%)
Reigate	M. Bilcliff	513 out of 56,449 (0.9%)
South East Staffordshire	Jill Taylor	895 out of 57,603 (1.6%)
Wycombe	Alan Page	449 out of 56,611 (0.8%)

Notes: Received 6,649 votes out of 33,614,074 (0.1%) | Position- 21/35

=== 1997 ===
Constituency	Candidate	Votes	%
East Yorkshire	Raymond Allerston	1,049 out of 48,971 (2.1%)	2.1%
Vale of York	Tony Pelton	197 out of 53,265 (0.4%)	0.4%

Notes: Received 1,246 votes out of 31,286,284 (0.0%) | Position- 42/49

=== 2010 ===
Constituency	Candidate	Votes
Birmingham Hodge Hill	Peter Johnson	637 out of 42,472 (1.5%)
East Yorkshire	Raymond Allerston	914 out of 51,254 (1.8%)

Notes: Received 1,551 votes out of 29,687,604 (0.0%) | Position- 43/58

=== 2015 ===
Constituency	Candidate	Votes
Birmingham Yardley	Peter Johnson	71 out of 41,313 (0.2%)
Kingston upon Hull East	Val Hoodless	54 out of 35,144 (0.2%)

Notes: Received 125 votes out of 30,697,525 (0.0%) | Position- N/A because the party received less than 400 votes

=== 2017 ===
Constituency	Candidate	Votes
Glasgow East	Steven Marshall	148 out of 36,175 (0.4%)
Sheffield Brightside & Hillsborough	Muzafar Rahman	47 out of 41,870 (0.1%)
Sheffield Central	Joe Westnidge	38 out of 47,877 (0.1%)
Sheffield Hallam	Steven Winstone	70 out of 57,020 (0.1%)
Sheffield Heeley	Jaspreet Oberoi	64 out of 44,226 (0.1%)
Sheffield South East	Ishleen Oberoi	102 out of 43,596 (0.2%)

Notes: Received 469 votes out of 32,204,184 (0.0%) | Position- 37/41

=== 2019 ===
Constituency	Candidate	Votes
Basildon & Billericay	Simon Breedon	224 out of 44,128 (0.5%)
Cambridge	Jane Robins	91 out of 53,729 (0.2%)
Cynon Valley	Ian McLean	114 out of 30,236 (0.4%)
Edinburgh South West	Mev Brown	114 out of 52,131 (0.2%)
Epping Forest	Jon Newham	170 out of 50,268 (0.3%)
Folkestone & Hythe	Colin Menniss	190 out of 59,005 (0.3%)
Havant	Alan Black	344 out of 45,959 (0.7%)
Jarrow	Mark Conway	212 out of 40,736 (0.5%)
Keighley	Matthew Rose	132 out of 52,600 (0.3%)
Leeds Central	William Clouston	281 out of 49,284 (0.6%)
Leeds West	Daniel Whetstone	46 out of 40,281 (0.1%)
Neath	Carl Williams	67 out of 36,756 (0.2%)
Thirsk & Malton	Michael Taylor	127 out of 56,588 (0.2%)
Tooting	Roz Hubley	77 out of 58,473 (0.1%)
Tottenham	Andrew Bence	91 out of 46,856 (0.2%)
Warrington South	Kevin Hickson	168 out of 61,899 (0.3%)
Warwick & Leamington	Xander Bennett	67 out of 54,205 (0.1%)
Watford	Michael McGetrick	333 out of 58,065 (0.6%)
Wentworth & Dearne	David Bettney	313 out of 41,557 (0.8%)
York Central	Andrew Dunn	134 out of 49,505 (0.3%)

Notes: Received 3,295 votes out of 32,014,110 (0.0%) | Position- 25/47

=== 2024 ===
Constituency	Candidate	Votes	Vote share	Vote change	Position
Doncaster North	Dave Bettney	1,960	6.3%	-	3rd
Leeds South	Daniel Whelstone	1,874	5.9%	5.3%	4th
Middlesbrough South and East Cleveland	Rod Liddle	1,835	4.8%	-	4th
Hexham	William Clouston	1,211	2.3%	-	6th
Sheffield South East	Matthel Lesse	1,061	3.0%	-	7th
Mid Dorset and North Poole	John Dowling	1,061	2.1%	-	5th
Sheffield Brightside and Hillsborough	Jeremy Turner	873	2.8%	-	7th
Earley and Woodley	Alaster Hunter	784	1.7%	-	5th
Brighton Kemptown and Peacehaven	Valerie Gray	784	1.9%	-	6th
Sheffield Heeley	Helen Jackman	711	1.8%	-	5th
Sheffield Hallam	Andrew Cowell	654	1.3%	-	5th
Stone, Great Wyrley and Penkridge	Alexander Branham	650	1.5%	-	6th
Bristol East	Claire Dunnage	555	1.2%	-	6th
Leeds East	Catherine Dobson	519	1.3%	-	7th
Maidenhead	Tim Burt	518	1.0%	-	6th
Henley and Thame	Maryse Pomlette	515	1.0%	-	6th
Ealing Central and Acton	Stephen Balogh	410	0.9%	-	7th
Mid Buckinghamshire	Yvonne Wilding	337	0.6%	-	6th
Sheffield Central	Annie Stoker	334	1.1%	-	8th
Coventry South	Alastair Mellon	334	0.8%	-	7th
Wythenshawe and Sale East	Hilary Salt	326	0.8%	-	7th
North Durham	Tom Chittenden	320	0.8%	-	7th
Sussex Weald	Stephen Gander	319	0.6%	-	7th
Bicester and Woodstock	Tim Funnel	291	0.6%	-	6th
Newcastle upon Tyne North	Martin Evison	285	0.6%	-	7th
Canterbury	Luke Buchanan-Hogman	285	0.6%	-	6th
Wellingborough and Rushden	Jeremy Brittian	273	0.6%	-	6th
Spelthorne	Alistair Miller	273	0.6%	-	6th
Oxford West and Abingdon	Anni Byard	259	0.6%	-	6th
Horsham	Paul Abbot	244	0.4%	-	7th
Carlisle	Rachel Hayton	244	0.5%	-	7th
Didcot and Wantage	Kim Pommlet	242	0.4%	-	6th
Orpington	John Bright	240	0.5%	-	6th
Manchester Central	Sebastian Moore	240	0.6%	-	7th
Ealing North	Les Beaumont	240	0.6%	-	8th
Droitwich and Evesham	Andrew Flaxman	239	0.5%	-	6th
North Ayrshire and Arran	Ian Gibson	238	0.6%	-	7th
Esher and Walton	Richard Bateson	234	0.4%	-	6th
Richmond Park	Richard Harrison	233	0.4%	-	7th
Bethnal Green and Stepney	Jon Madbutt	233	0.5%	-	11th
Oxford East	Benjamin Adams	232	0.6%	-	11th
Lewes	Rowena Easton	229	0.4%	-	6th
Salford	Stephen Lewthwaite	227	0.6%	-	7th
Harpenden and Berkhamsted	Mark Pattern	223	0.4%	-	6th
Macclesfield	Dickie Fletcher	222	0.4%	-	7th
Bristol North West	Ben Smith	222	0.5%	-	6th
Sevenoaks	Adam Hibbert	209	0.4%	-	7th
Grantham and Bourne	Alexander Mitchell	204	0.4%	-	8th
Harborough, Oadby and Wigston	Robin Lambert	203	0.4%	-	6th
Vauxhall and Camberwell Green	Andrew Mcrobbie	201	0.5%	-	6th
Uxbridge and South Ruislip	Steve Gardner	200	0.4%	-	7th
Gainsborough	Tim Melloris	196	0.4%	-	6th
Poplar and Limehouse	Manny Lawal	194	0.5%	-	8th
Central Ayrshire	Alan Macmillan	188	0.5%	-	8th
Leeds Central and Headingley	Rob Walker	187	0.6%	-	7th
Wakefield and Rothwell	Nicholas Sanders	185	0.5%	-	8th
Brighton Pavilion	Carl Buckfield	184	0.4%	-	7th
Arundel and South Downs	Mike Smith	184	0.3%	-	6th
City of Durham	Sarah Welbourne	178	0.4%	-	6th
Mid Bedfordshire	Richard Brunning	172	0.3%	-	7th
Ely and East Cambridgeshire	Robert Bayley	172	0.3%	-	7th
Calder Valley	Jim Mcnell	171	0.3%	-	7th
Redcar	Gary Conlin	169	0.4%	-	6th
Bristol South	Neil Norton	164	0.4%	-	6th
Islington South and Finsbury	Jake Painter	162	0.4%	-	9th
South West Hertfordshire	Michael Mcgetrick	158	0.3%	-	8th
New Forest West	Paul Simon	157	0.3%	-	7th
Tonbridge	Ian Grattidge	156	0.3%	-	7th
South Cotswolds	Martin Broomfield	156	0.3%	-	8th
Penrith and Solway	Shaun Long	156	0.3%	-	7th
Banbury	Declan Sopher	155	0.3%	-	8th
Manchester Withington	Wendy Andrew	154	0.4%	-	7th
Epsom and Ewell	Damon Young	153	0.3%	-	7th
East Hampshire	Sara Smith	152	0.3%	-	7th
Battersea	Ed Dampier	149	0.3%	-	9th
Blackpool North and Fleetwood	Jan Cresswell	147	0.4%	-	8th
Winchester	Andrew Davis	146	0.3%	-	6th
Chatham and Aylesford	Steve Tanner	141	0.3%	-	8th
South Basildon and East Thurrock	Simon Breedon	140	0.4%	-	8th
Streatham and Croydon North	Myles Owen	139	0.3%	-	8th
Pontefract, Castleford and Knottingley	Trevor Lake	139	0.4%	-	6th
Hendon	Jane Gibson	139	0.3%	-	8th
Bournemouth West	David Warden	139	0.4%	-	7th
Shipley	Paul Shkura	137	0.3%	-	9th
Cramlington and Killingworth	Mathew Wilkinson	137	0.3%	-	8th
Knowsley	Patricia Jameson	135	0.4%	-	7th
Blaydon and Consett	Paul Topping	135	0.3%	-	6th
West Suffolk	Ivan Kinsman	133	0.3%	-	8th
Beaconsfield	Catherine Harker	131	0.3%	-	7th
Worcester	Duncan Murray	130	0.3%	-	7th
South Norfolk	Jason Maguire	129	0.3%	-	7th
Leeds North East	Cordelia Lynan	125	0.3%	-	9th
Bristol North East	Tommy Trueman	122	0.3%	-	8th
Waveney Valley	Maya Serevyn	118	0.2%	-	6th
Runcorn and Helsby	Paul Murphy	116	0.3%	-	7th
Aylesbury	Richard Wilding	116	0.2%	-	7th
Hazel Grove	Tim O'Rouke	113	0.2%	-	6th
Gillingham and Rainham	Peter Wheeler	111	0.3%	-	8th
Warrington South	Graeme Kelly	110	0.2%	-0.1%	7th
Kingston upon Hull West and Haltemprice	Lucy Needham	110	0.3%	-	6th
Cities of London and Westminster	Huge De Burgh	110	0.3%	-	8th
Great Grimsby and Cleethorpes	Christopher Stephinson	108	0.3%	-	7th
Bridlington and The Wolds	Carlo Verda	104	0.2%	-	8th
St Albans	Stewart Satterly	103	0.2%	-	7th
Leeds South West and Morley	Nigel Perry	99	0.2%	-	7th
Luton North	Paul Trathen	98	0.3%	-	8th
North Herefordshire	Michael Guest	95	0.2%	-	6th
Newcastle upon Tyne East and Wallsend	Robert Malyn	95	0.2%	-	9th
North Northumberland	Andrew Martin	92	0.2%	-	8th
Louth and Horncastle	Marcus Moorhouse	92	0.2%	-	8th
Beverley and Holderness	Chris Collin	89	0.2%	-	7th
Bournemouth East	Miles Penn	88	0.2%	-	7th
Kettering	Matthew Murphy	85	0.2%	-	7th
Carshalton and Wallington	Steve Kelleher	85	0.2%	-	8th
Lincoln	Craig Marshall	80	0.2%	-	9th
Leeds West and Pudsey	Sasha Watson	79	0.2%	0.1%	8th
Leeds North West	Kathy Bushell	78	0.2%	-	7th
Scarborough and Whitby	Thomas Foster	76	0.2%	-	8th
North Dorset	Daniel Woodruffe	74	0.1%	-	8th
Bradford East	Richard Riley	65	0.2%	-	10th
Christchurch	Trevor Parsons	59	0.1%	-	9th
Westmorland and Lonsdale	Wendy Long	57	0.1%	-	8th
Total	N/A	33,811	0.12%		7th (nationally)

== By-elections ==
=== 1987–1992 Parliament ===
By-election	Candidate	Votes	Position
1991 Neath	John Warman	1,826 out of 34,753 (5.3%)	5th of 8
1993 Newbury	Alan Page	33 out of 57,399 (0.1%)	17th of 19

Notes: Won back deposit

=== 2017–2019 Parliament ===
By-election	Candidate	Votes	Position
2019 Newport West	Ian McLean	202 out of 23,515 (0.9%)	9th of 11
2019 Peterborough	Patrick O'Flynn	135 out of 33,920 (0.4%)	9th of 15

=== 2019–2024 Parliament ===
By-election	Candidate	Votes	Position
2021 Hartlepool	David Bettney	108 out of 29,333 (0.4%)	14th of 16
2021 Airdrie & Shotts	Neil Manson	151 out of 21,827 (0.7%)	5th of 8
2021 Batley & Spen	Ollie Purser	66 out of 37,695 (0.2%)	14th of 16
2022 Stretford and Urmston	Julien Yvon	74 out of 18,418 (0.4%)	9th of 9
2023 Selby and Ainsty	John Waterstone	314 out of 35,886 (0.9%)	8th of 13
2023 Uxbridge and South Ruislip	Steve Gardner	248 out of 30,925 (0.8%)	6th of 17

=== 2024–present Parliament ===
By-election	Candidate	Votes	Position
2025 Runcorn and Helsby	Paul Murphy	68 out of 32,655 (0.2%)	13th of 15
2026 Gorton and Denton	Sebastian Moore	46 out of 36,904 (0.1%)	9th of 10
2026 Clacton	William Clouston	256 out of 35,111 (0.7%)	7th of 34

== Scottish Parliament elections ==
=== 2021 ===
Region	Candidates	Votes
Glasgow	Anthony McGinley, Robin John Dudfield, Robert Malyn, Richard Cameron	178 (0.1%)
Lothian	Alasdair Young, Neil Manson, Lawrence Edwards	227 (0.1%)

Notes: Received 405 votes out of 2,706,761 | Position- 21/25

== Senedd elections ==
=== 2026 ===
Constituency	Candidates	Votes
Fflint Wrecsam	Daniel McNay	165 (0.2%)

== London mayoral elections ==
=== 2021 ===
Candidate	First round votes
Steve Kelleher	8,764 out of 2,531,357 (0.3%)

Notes: Position- 17/20

=== 2024 ===
Candidate	Votes
Amy Gallagher	34,449 out of 2,495,559 (1.4%)

Notes: Position- 7/13 Source:

== London Assembly elections ==
=== 2021 ===
Constituency	Candidates	Votes
London-wide	Eric Siva-Jothy, Stephen Gardner, Matthew Beresford, Simon Marshall, Brilant Krasniqi,Seth Liebowitz, Tricia Bracher, Rosamund Hubley	7,782 out of 2,599,650 (0.3%)

Notes: Position- 16/18

=== 2024 ===
Constituency	Candidates	Votes
London-wide	Amy Gallagher, Huge De Burgh, Stephen Balogh, Jon Mabbutt, Manny Lawal, Jane Gibson, Steve Kelleher, Alastair Mellon, Laurenzo Mefsut, Daniel Woodruffe, Jake Painter, David Hargreaves, Les Beaumont	23,021 out of 2,476,687 (0.9%)

== Mayoral elections ==
=== Combined authority ===
Authority	Election	Candidate	1st round votes	%
South Yorkshire	2022	David Bettney	10,177	3.9
South Yorkshire	2024	David Bettney	20,835	7.6

=== Metropolitan borough ===
Authority	Election	Candidate	Votes	%
Doncaster	2025	David Bettney	929	1.3
