= 2018 Sheffield City Region mayoral election =

First mayoral election in South Yorkshire

- 3 May 2018
- Turnout: 25.9%
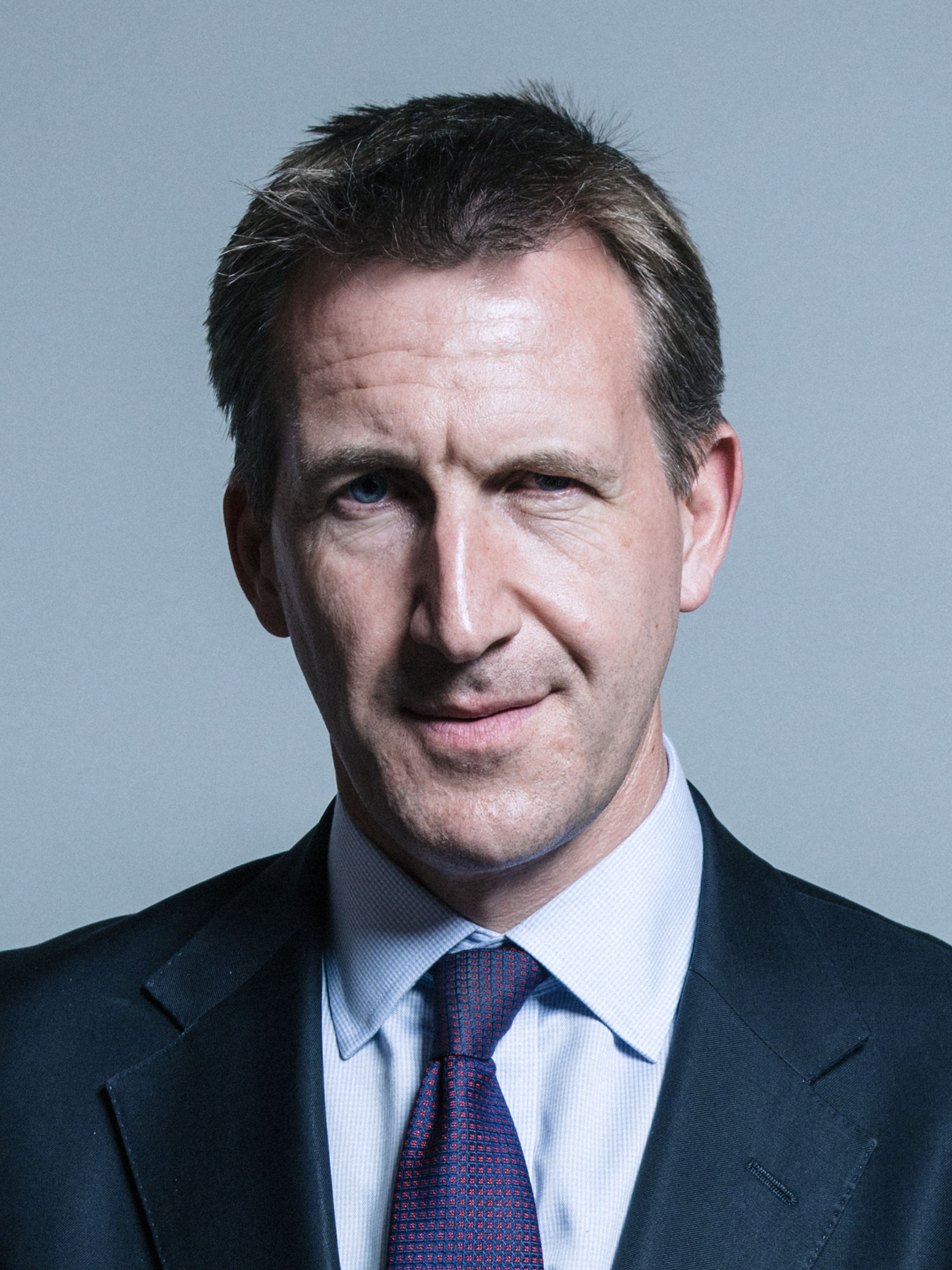
Candidate	Dan Jarvis	Ian Walker	Hannah Kitching
Party	Labour Co-op	Conservative	Liberal Democrats
1st Round vote	122,635	37,738	27,146
Percentage	47.1%	14.5%	10.4%
2nd Round vote	144,154	50,619	Eliminated
Percentage	74.0%	26.0%	Eliminated
Candidate	Mick Bower	Rob Murphy	David Allen
Party	Yorkshire	Green	English Democrat
1st Round vote	22,318	20,339	14,547
Percentage	8.6%	7.8%	5.6%
2nd Round vote	Eliminated	Eliminated	Eliminated
Percentage	Eliminated	Eliminated	Eliminated
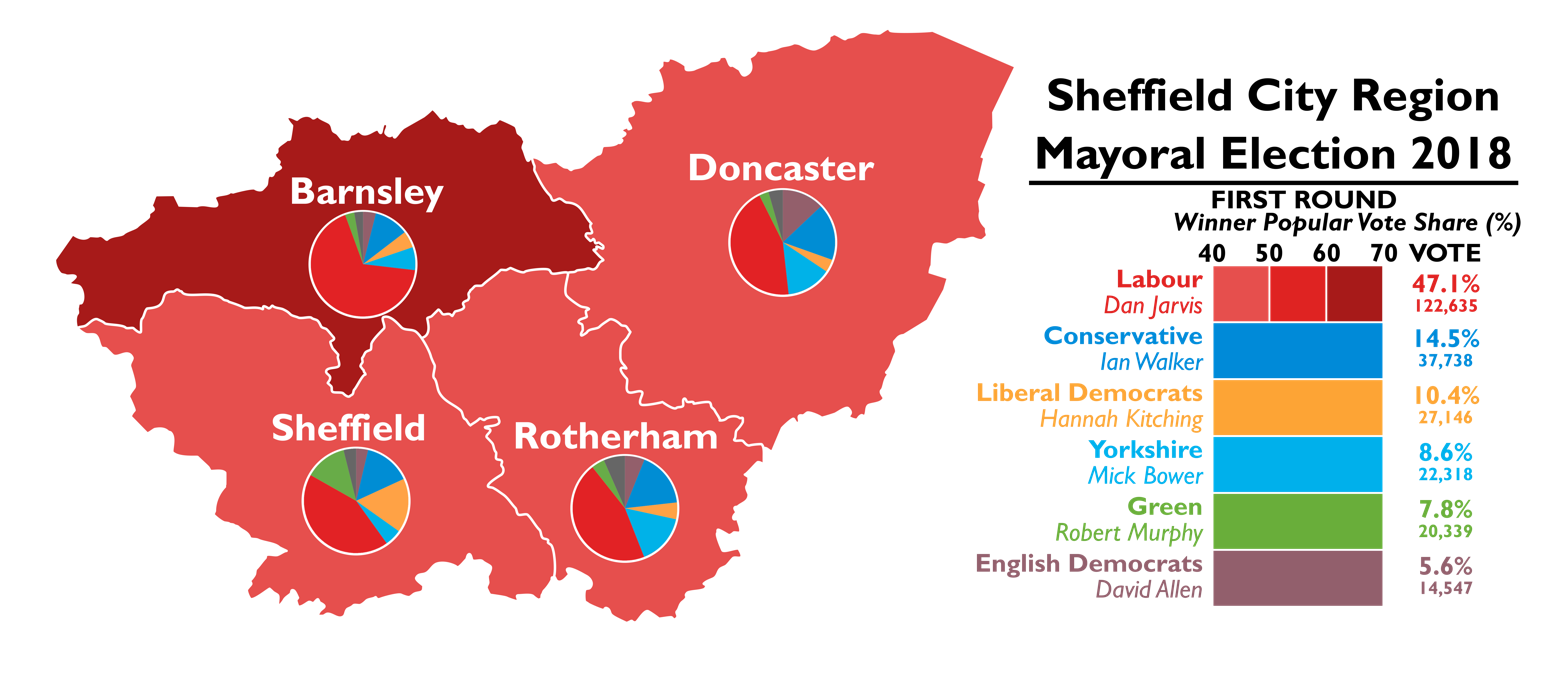
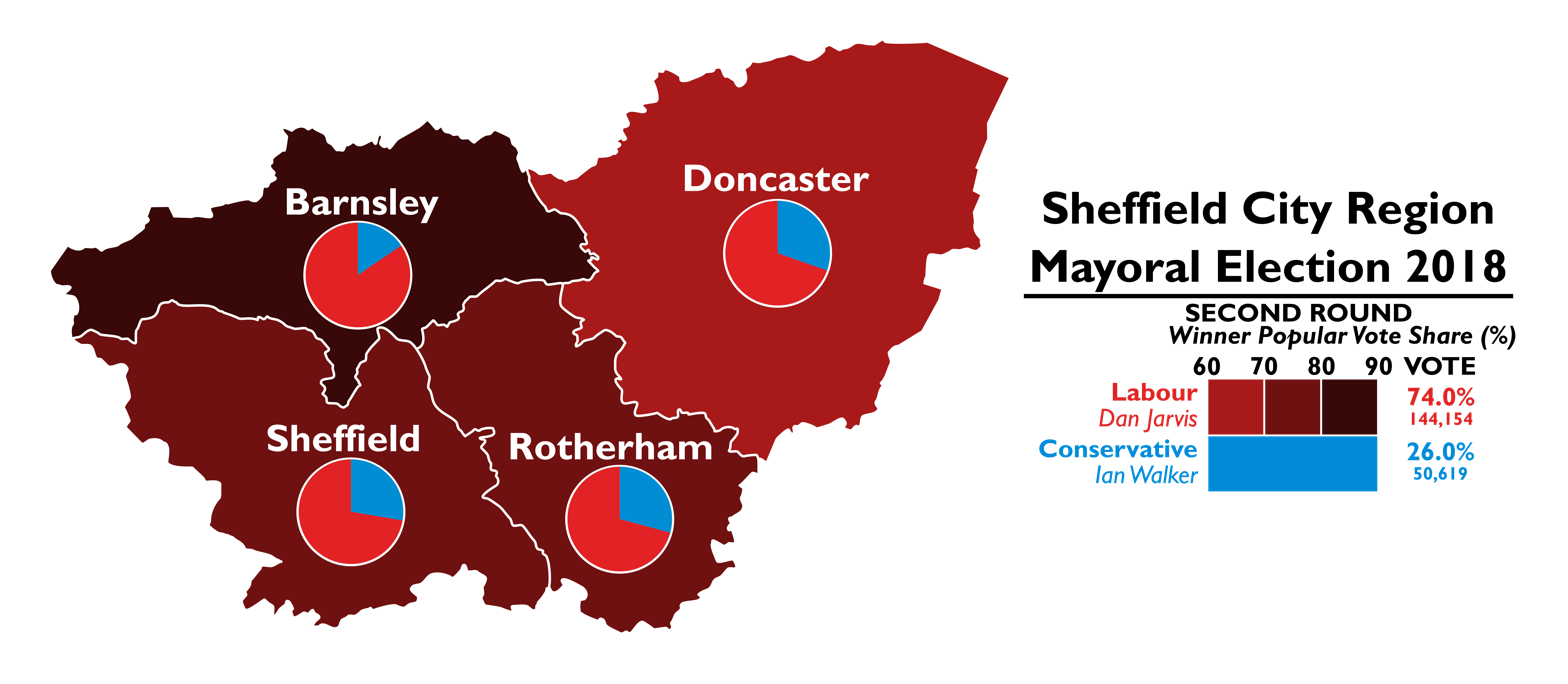
Elected Mayor
Dan Jarvis
Labour Co-op

The inaugural Sheffield City Region mayoral election was held on 3 May 2018 to elect the mayor of the Sheffield City Region. The mayor will lead the Sheffield City Region Combined Authority. Voting is restricted to the four councils which are constituent members of the combined authority: Barnsley, Doncaster, Rotherham and Sheffield. Together these councils make up South Yorkshire.

As the election took place using the supplementary vote system, electors were able to vote for a "first preference" candidate and a "second preference" candidate. The leading candidate needed to achieve over 50% of the first preference votes in order to be elected in the first round. As the leading candidate, Dan Jarvis, received 47.1% of the total number of votes in the first round, the election proceeded to the second round and voters second preferences were distributed between the two leading candidates. Dan Jarvis, the Labour and Co-operative candidate, was subsequently elected in the second round with a total number of 144,154 votes.

Subsequent elections were held in 2022 and 2024.

== Electoral system ==
The election used a supplementary vote system, in which voters express a first and second preference of candidates.

- If a candidate receives over 50% of the first preference vote the candidate wins.
- If no candidate receives an overall majority, i.e., over 50% of first preference votes, the top two candidates proceed to a second round and all other candidates are eliminated.
- The first preference votes for the remaining two candidates stand in the final count.
- Voters' ballots whose first and second preference candidates are eliminated are discarded.
- Voters whose first preference candidates have been eliminated and whose second preference candidate is in the top two have their second preference votes added to the count.

This means that the winning candidate has the support of a majority of voters who expressed a preference among the top two.

All registered electors (British, Irish, Commonwealth and European Union citizens) living in the combined authority area aged 18 or over on 3 May 2018 were entitled to vote in the mayoral election.

== Results ==
=== Overall ===
Sheffield City Region Mayoral Election 2018
Party	Candidate	1st round		2nd round			1st round votesTransfer votes, 2nd round
Party	Candidate	Total	Of round	Transfers	Total	Of round	1st round votesTransfer votes, 2nd round
Labour Co-op	Dan Jarvis	122,635	47.1%	21,519	144,154	74.0%	
Conservative	Ian Walker	37,738	14.5%	12,881	50,619	26.0%	
Liberal Democrats	Hannah Kitching	27,146	10.4%				
Yorkshire	Mick Bower	22,318	8.6%				
Green	Robert Murphy	20,339	7.8%				
English Democrat	David Allen	14,547	5.6%				
South Yorkshire Save Our NHS	Naveen Judah	10,837	4.2%				
Majority							
Turnout		260,260	25.8%	Rejected ballots: 4,713			
Labour Co-op win							

=== By area ===
==== Barnsley ====
Party	Candidate	1st round votes	%
Labour Co-op	Dan Jarvis	30,250	66.7
Conservative	Ian Walker	4,774	10.5
Yorkshire	Mick Bower	3,158	7.0
Liberal Democrats	Hannah Kitching	2,302	5.1
English Democrat	David Allen	1,754	3.9
Green	Robert Murphy	1,249	2.8
South Yorkshire Save Our NHS	Naveen Judah	1,206	2.7
Rejected ballots		686	1.5
Turnout		45,379	25.4

==== Doncaster ====
Party	Candidate	1st round votes	%
Labour Co-op	Dan Jarvis	19,653	43.9
Conservative	Ian Walker	7,747	17.3
Yorkshire	Mick Bower	6,156	13.7
English Democrat	David Allen	5,713	12.8
South Yorkshire Save Our NHS	Naveen Judah	1,980	4.4
Liberal Democrats	Hannah Kitching	1,755	3.9
Green	Robert Murphy	1,280	2.9
Rejected ballots		490	1.1
Turnout		44,774	20.1

==== Rotherham ====
Party	Candidate	1st round votes	%
Labour Co-op	Dan Jarvis	18,680	44.7
Conservative	Ian Walker	7,071	16.9
Yorkshire	Mick Bower	6,422	15.4
South Yorkshire Save Our NHS	Naveen Judah	2,724	6.5
English Democrat	David Allen	2,516	6.0
Liberal Democrats	Hannah Kitching	2,145	5.1
Green	Robert Murphy	1,686	4.0
Rejected ballots		526	1.3
Turnout		41,770	21.4

==== Sheffield ====
Party	Candidate	1st round votes	%
Labour Co-op	Dan Jarvis	54,052	42.1
Liberal Democrats	Hannah Kitching	20,944	16.3
Conservative	Ian Walker	18,146	14.1
Green	Robert Murphy	16,124	12.6
Yorkshire	Mick Bower	6,582	5.1
South Yorkshire Save Our NHS	Naveen Judah	4,927	3.8
English Democrat	David Allen	4,564	3.6
Rejected ballots		3,011	2.3
Turnout		128,350	31.7

== Candidates ==
=== Conservative Party ===
- Ian Walker, parliamentary candidate for Sheffield Hallam in 2015 and 2017

=== Green Party of England and Wales ===
- Rob Murphy, Speaker for the Green Group on Sheffield Council

=== English Democrats ===
- David Allen

=== Labour Party ===
- Dan Jarvis, MP for Barnsley Central from 2011 onwards, was selected to stand in a ballot of Labour Party members. Jarvis was also selected by the Co-operative Party and stood as a joint Labour and Co-operative candidate.

Selection vote
Candidate	Votes	Percentage
Dan Jarvis	2,584	57.6%
Ben Curran	1,903	42.4%

=== Liberal Democrats ===
- Hannah Kitching, businessperson and campaigner

=== South Yorkshire Save Our NHS ===
- Naveen Judah

=== Yorkshire Party ===
- Mick Bower, candidate for Rotherham in 2017

== Endorsements ==
=== Dan Jarvis ===
- David Blunkett
- Kevin Barron
- Ed Miliband
- Stephanie Peacock
- Rosie Winterton

=== Naveen Judah ===
- National Health Action Party
