= Hannah Kitching, Baroness Kitching of Penistone =

British Liberal Democrats politician

The Right Honourable The Baroness Kitching of Penistone

Member of the House of Lords
- Lord Temporal
- Life peerage 2 September 2026

Personal details
- Born: Hannah Ruth Kitching
- Party: Liberal Democrats

Hannah Ruth Kitching, Baroness Kitching of Penistone is a British businesswoman, local government politician, and former physiotherapist.

== Political career ==
From 2018 to 2026, she was a Liberal Democrat councillor on Barnsley Council, rising to become leader of the opposition. She stood as the Liberal Democratic candidate for Mayor of the Sheffield City Region in the 2018 mayoral election, and for the now named Mayor of South Yorkshire in the 2024 mayoral election. She has also stood unsuccessfully to be elected a Member of Parliament in the Penistone and Stocksbridge constituency in the 2019 general election, receiving 5,054 votes (10.2%), and in the Oldham West, Chadderton and Royton constituency in the 2024 general election, receiving 1,271 votes (3.3%).

In the July 2026 political peerages, it was announced that she was to be made a life peer and would sit in the House of Lords for the Liberal Democrats. She was created as Baroness Kitching of Penistone, of Penistone in the County of South Yorkshire on 2 September 2026.
