= Oliver Coppard =

British politician (born 1981)

Mayor Oliver Coppard
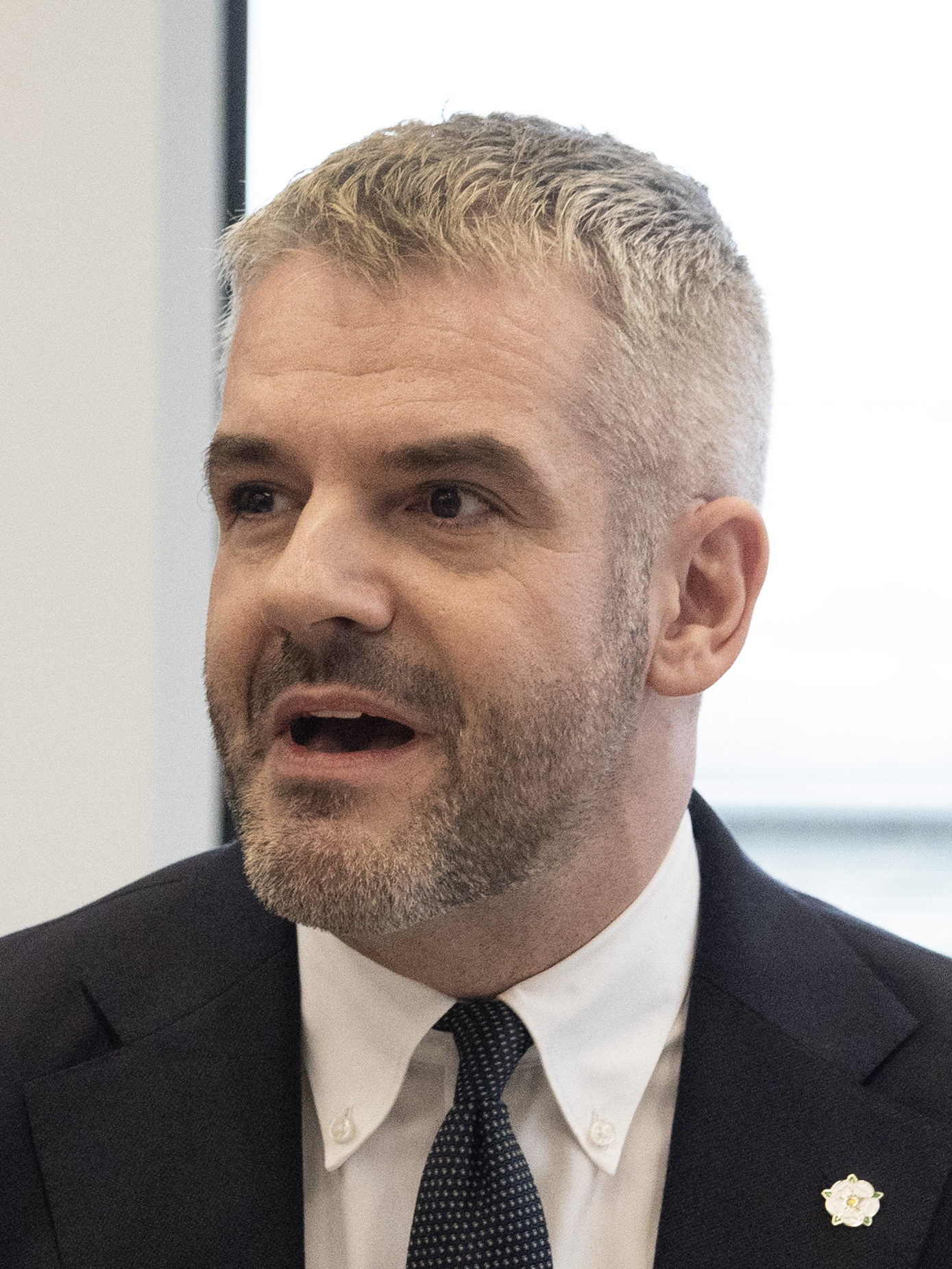
- Coppard in 2024

Mayor of South Yorkshire
- Incumbent
- Assumed office 9 May 2022
- Preceded by: Dan Jarvis

Personal details
- Born: Oliver James Coppard; 9 June 1981 (age 45) South Yorkshire, England
- Party: Labour Co-op
- Education: University of Leeds (BA)

Oliver James Coppard (born 9 June 1981) is a British Labour and Co-operative politician serving as the strategic authority mayor for South Yorkshire since 2022. He was re-elected in 2024.

== Early life and education ==
Coppard attended Silverdale School and High Storrs School.

He was awarded a bachelor's degree in Politics and Parliamentary Studies from the University of Leeds. During his tenure at Leeds, he interned in the office of Dick Gephardt, then the Democratic Leader in the US House of Representatives. Coppard later interned in the office of Meg Munn when she was Member of Parliament for Sheffield Heeley.

== Political career ==
At the 2004 Sheffield City Council election, Coppard was one of three Labour candidates who unsuccessfully contested Graves Park.

Coppard volunteered for the Obama campaign for the 2012 US presidential election. He was director of the remain campaign in Yorkshire and the Humber and Lincolnshire for the 2016 European Union referendum.

Coppard stood in Sheffield Hallam at the 2015 general election, against then Deputy Prime Minister Nick Clegg. He failed to defeat Clegg but achieved a swing of over 16% from the Liberal Democrats to Labour. Coppard has stated that he chose not to contest the seat in 2019 due to Labour antisemitism.

In the 2022 South Yorkshire mayoral election, Coppard was selected as the Labour candidate. He won the election, getting a plurality of votes in the first round, at 43.1% and defeating the Conservative candidate Clive Watkinson by a margin of 71.4% to 28.6% in the second round.

On 12 March 2024, Coppard announced £2.2 million funding to provide a safe space to sleep for every child aged 0–5 in South Yorkshire. Coppard told the Yorkshire Post that he established the programme because he knew that 'one in nine babies that go home from hospital in Sheffield alone go home without a safe place to sleep' and they can 'end up sleeping in a bath or a box, a drawer, in a bouncy chair'. The scheme is delivered by the UK charity Baby Basics, who had already established the need and the format for addressing it.

On 22 March 2024, under Coppard's leadership the South Yorkshire Mayoral Combined Authority formally brought the Supertram under public control. This move was welcomed by commentators, with Matthew Topham from Better Buses for South Yorkshire calling 'a day of celebration when our local transport will be run by and for the people it serves' and a Sheffield Councillor called it a 'brave decision' that deserves 'all of our support' in a column for the Sheffield Telegraph. Plans to bring the tram under SYMCA ownership had been set in motion by the previous mayor, Dan Jarvis.

== Personal life ==
Coppard is a resident of Sheffield. He is Jewish. Coppard was the Chair of Trustees at the Hallam Students' Union.
