= Dan Jarvis =

British politician (born 1972)

Major The Right Honourable Dan Jarvis MBE MP
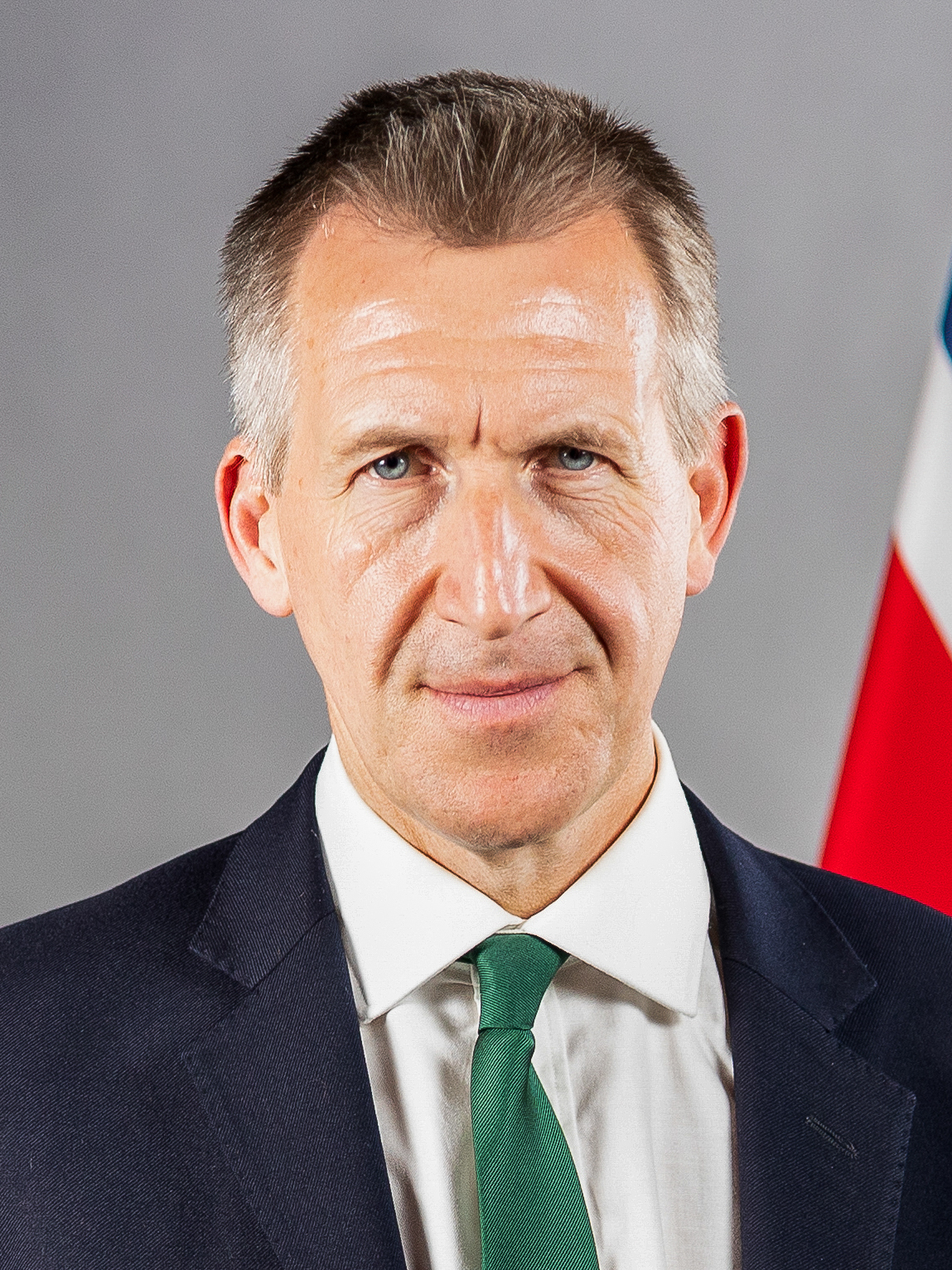
- Official portrait, 2024

Minister of State for Security
- Incumbent
- Assumed office 21 July 2026
- Prime Minister: Andy Burnham
- Preceded by: Angela Eagle
- In office 6 July 2024 – 11 June 2026
- Prime Minister: Keir Starmer
- Preceded by: Tom Tugendhat
- Succeeded by: Angela Eagle

Secretary of State for Defence
- In office 11 June 2026 – 20 July 2026
- Prime Minister: Keir Starmer
- Preceded by: John Healey
- Succeeded by: Wes Streeting

Minister of State in the Cabinet Office
- In office 6 September 2025 – 11 June 2026
- Prime Minister: Keir Starmer
- Preceded by: Douglas Alexander
- Succeeded by: Angela Eagle
Shadow portfolios
2023–2024	Minister for Security
2015–2015	Foreign Affairs
2013–2015	Youth Justice and Victims
2011–2013	Culture

Member of Parliament for Barnsley North Barnsley Central (2011–2024)
- Incumbent
- Assumed office 3 March 2011
- Preceded by: Eric Illsley
- Majority: 7,811 (21.1%)

Mayor of South Yorkshire Sheffield City Region (2018–2021)
- In office 7 May 2018 – 8 May 2022
- Preceded by: Office established
- Succeeded by: Oliver Coppard

Personal details
- Born: Daniel Owen Woolgar Jarvis; 30 November 1972 (age 53) Nottingham, England
- Party: Labour Co-op
- Spouse(s): Caroline (died 2010) Rachel Jarvis (m. 2013)
- Children: 3
- Education: Aberystwyth University (BA); Royal Military Academy Sandhurst; King's College London (MA)
- Website: Official website

Military service
- Allegiance: United Kingdom
- Branch/service: British Army
- Years of service: 1997–2011
- Rank: Major
- Unit: Parachute Regiment
- Battles/wars: Operation Banner; Kosovo War; Operation Telic; Operation Herrick

Daniel Owen Woolgar Jarvis (born 30 November 1972) is a British politician and former Army officer who has served as Minister of State for Security since July 2026, having previously held the role from 2024 to June 2026. He previously served as Secretary of State for Defence from June to July 2026. A member of the Labour and Co-operative Party, he has been the Member of Parliament (MP) for Barnsley North, formerly Barnsley Central, since 2011.

Born in Nottingham, Jarvis attended Rushcliffe School in West Bridgford. He obtained a Bachelor of Arts (BA) in international politics and strategic studies at University of Wales, Aberystwyth, before earning a Master of Arts (MA) from King's College, London. Jarvis was commissioned from the Royal Military Academy Sandhurst in 1997 into the 1st Battalion, Parachute Regiment. He was promoted to Captain in 2001 and Major in 2003. Jarvis was platoon commander with the 3rd Battalion, Parachute Regiment during the Kosovo War, and in 2000 was deployed to Sierra Leone after Operation Barras. He served in the Iraq War during Operation Telic and in the War in Afghanistan during Operation Herrick. Jarvis was also deployed to Northern Ireland, before he resigned his commission in March 2011. In the 2011 Queen's Birthday Honours, he was made a Member of the British Empire (MBE) in the military division.

Jarvis joined the Labour Party while at university, and was his party's candidate for Barnsley Central during the 2011 by-election. He was elected for the constituency, succeeding Eric Illsley. In October of the same year, Jarvis joined the opposition frontbench under Ed Miliband as shadow minister for culture. In the 2013 shadow cabinet reshuffle, he was moved to become shadow youth justice and victims minister. Following Labour's defeat in the 2015 general election, Jarvis became shadow minister for foreign affairs, before leaving the frontbench upon the election of Jeremy Corbyn as leader in September 2015. After his reelection as an MP at the 2017 general election, he was elected Mayor of the Sheffield City Region in 2018, serving until 2022.

After serving on the backbenches for eight years, Jarvis made a return to the shadow frontbench in the 2023 British shadow cabinet reshuffle as Shadow Minister for Security under Keir Starmer. Following Labour's victory in the 2024 general election, Jarvis was appointed to the government as Minister of State for Security. In September 2025, he was additionally appointed Minister of State in the Cabinet Office. After the resignation of John Healey, Jarvis was promoted to Secretary of State for Defence in June 2026. He was demoted the following month to his previous roles of security and cabinet office minister.

== Early life ==
Daniel Owen Woolgar Jarvis was born in Nottingham on 30 November 1972, the son of a lecturer at a teacher-training college and a probation officer, both Labour Party members. He attended Lady Bay Primary School and then went on to study at Rushcliffe School.

He studied international politics at what was then the University of Wales, Aberystwyth. He graduated in 1996, with a Bachelor of Arts degree in international politics and strategic studies. He graduated with an MA in conflict, security and development from King's College, London, in 2011.

== Military career ==
Jarvis was commissioned from the Royal Military Academy Sandhurst on 9 August 1997 into the 1st Battalion, Parachute Regiment. He was promoted to captain on 10 October 2001 and to major on 31 July 2003. In the later part of his army career he was stationed at HQ Land Forces in Wilton and lived in Salisbury.

In 1999 Jarvis was a platoon commander with the 3rd Battalion, Parachute Regiment in Kosovo and was with Gen. Sir Mike Jackson during the Pristina Airport incident when Jackson refused the suggestion of his American NATO superior to confront Russian forces. Jarvis later described Jackson's comment to Wesley Clark that he was "not going to start World War Three for you" as a "very surreal moment in my life". Jarvis then served as Jackson's personal staff officer. In 2000 he was deployed to Sierra Leone in the aftermath of Operation Barras to help the army learn the lessons of the kidnap of a group of troops by an armed rebel group.

Jarvis served in Iraq during Operation Telic and in Afghanistan during Operation Herrick. He was deployed to Afghanistan twice, first as a member of the team making the first reconnaissance trips to Helmand Province in 2005 to 2006, in preparation for a decision on whether to commit British troops there. The second deployment was a six-month tour as a company commander with the Special Forces Support Group, leading a company of 100 troops. He was also deployed to Northern Ireland.

He resigned his commission on 3 March 2011. In the 2011 Queen's Birthday Honours he was made a Member of the Order of the British Empire (Military division).

== Early political career ==
Although his military service had precluded political activity, Jarvis had joined the Labour Party at the age of 18 while at university. Shortly before the 2010 general election, Jarvis was shortlisted for the Labour Party selection in the South Wales seat of Islwyn. He picked up support from one local would-be candidate who had not made the shortlist, but he was not selected.

Jarvis was selected as the Labour candidate for Barnsley Central on 27 January 2011, following the resignation of Eric Illsley who stood down after being convicted of fraud for his part in the United Kingdom parliamentary expenses scandal. An eliminating ballot was held and at the penultimate stage Jarvis was tied with local councillor Linda Burgess, each several votes behind Richard Burgon. London Regional Director, Ken Clark, put two pieces of paper into the hat of Phil Dilks, the Press Officer: one that read "Loser" and one "Winner". Burgess, in going first, picked out the paper reading "Loser", and Jarvis won. In the final stage he picked up most of Burgess' votes, and won selection. He became the first Labour candidate for the Barnsley Central seat since 1938 who was not born in Yorkshire.

On his selection, he resigned his commission in order to stand in the by-election; he gave his campaign the codename 'Operation Honey Badger', referring to a famously fierce animal and signifying his determination to fight for the people of Barnsley. Jarvis found that his Nottingham origins put off some Barnsley voters, who remembered the fact that Nottinghamshire miners did not join the 1984–85 miners' strike, although he had been 12 at the time.

== Mayoralty and parliamentary career ==
=== Early career ===
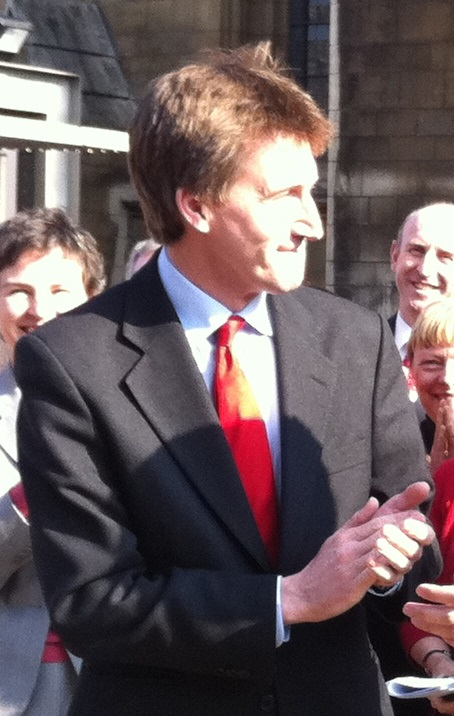
Jarvis in 2011 during the Barnsley by-election

He was elected for Barnsley Central with a 60.8% share of the vote on a turnout of 36.5% in the by-election held on 3 March 2011.

During his maiden speech on the 2011 budget, Jarvis called for a change in economic policy including "a plan to get jobs and to help families feeling the squeeze". He also referred to Parachute Regiment colleagues who had been killed in action and argued that the UK and US should put forward reconciliation in Afghanistan. He joined the Business, Innovation and Skills Select Committee on 21 March. Jarvis spoke in a debate about NHS reforms in May 2011, paying emotional tribute to the doctors and nurses who cared for his wife, who had died the previous year, and feared an "ideological free-market agenda" which he said would undermine "all that is great about the NHS".

In October 2011, Jarvis was appointed shadow arts minister, part of the shadow culture, media and sport team led by Harriet Harman; he moved to become shadow youth justice and victims minister in Labour leader Ed Miliband's October 2013 shadow cabinet reshuffle.

Following the Labour Party's defeat in the 2015 general election, and the resignation of Ed Miliband, media speculation about candidates for the party's leadership election included Dan Jarvis alongside several other MPs. However, he quickly announced that he was not going to run, saying that he needed to put his young family first; he had recently remarried after losing his first wife to cancer. He was made Shadow Minister for Foreign Affairs, before resigning upon the election of Jeremy Corbyn as leader.

=== Mayoralty (2018–2022) ===
==== Candidacy ====
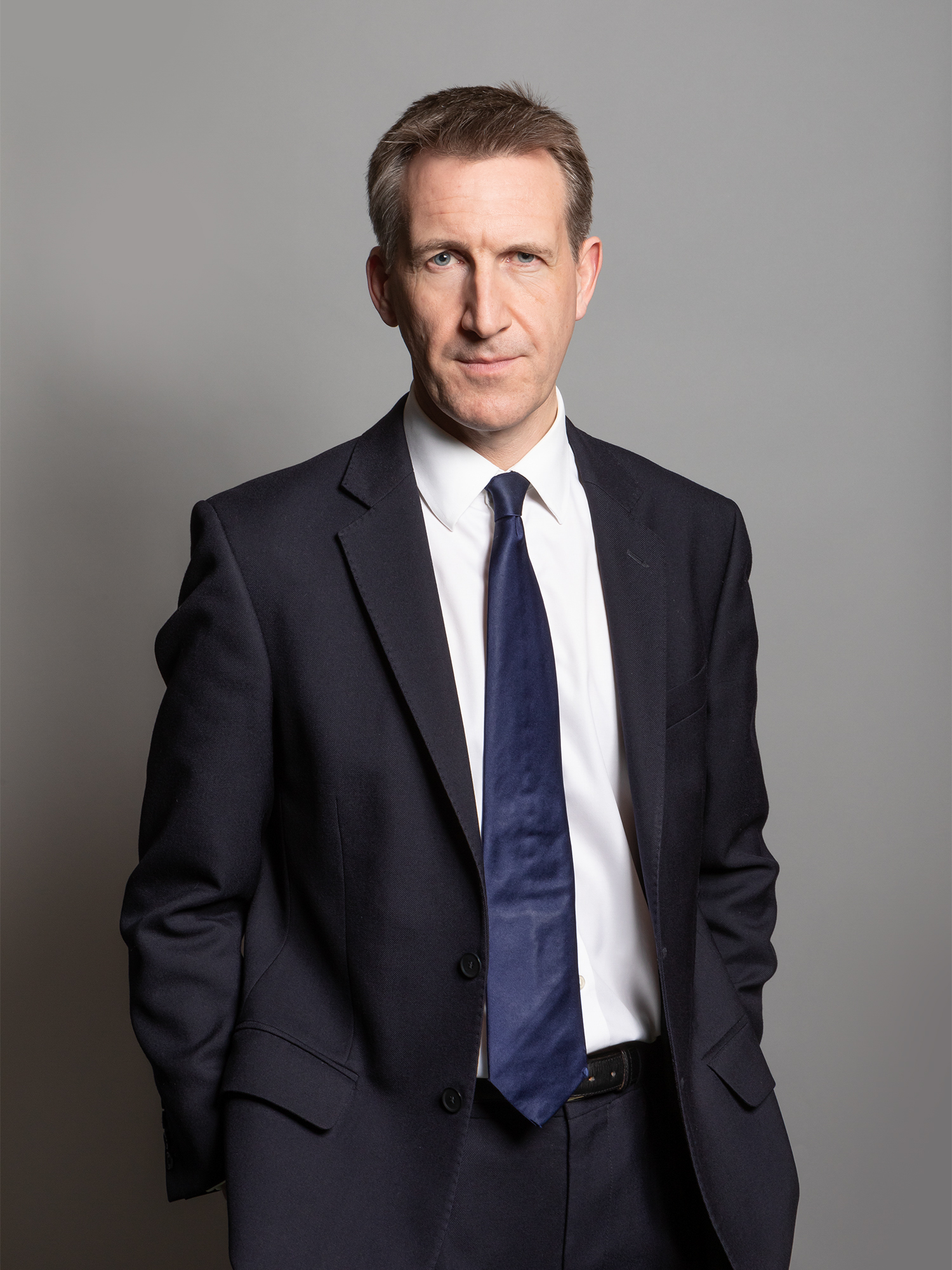
Official portrait, 2020

Jarvis was elected Mayor of the Sheffield City Region in 2018. He was the first directly elected mayor of the Sheffield City Region, receiving 48% of the vote in the first count and securing his position after the second count against Tory rival Ian Walker. Jarvis successfully challenged Labour's decision to prevent him from holding dual public offices.

Upon taking office, he became entitled to the style of Mayor. On 20 September 2021 he announced he would not be standing for re-election at the 2022 South Yorkshire mayoral election. but would remain an MP.

==== Economy ====
As mayor, Jarvis implemented several policies that aimed to transform the area economically and socially. One of his notable initiatives was the Strategic Economic Plan (SEP), a 20-year blueprint designed to foster stronger, greener, and fairer economic growth. The plan outlined aims to achieve net zero carbon emissions by 2040, creating high-paid jobs, and reducing income inequality. The SEP was developed in collaboration with South Yorkshire's councils and local businesses and with both public and private partnerships in driving regional development.

In addition to the SEP, Jarvis also focused on improving skills and educational opportunities within Sheffield with initiatives like the Sheffield Children's University, which incentivised children to participate in extra-curricular activities to boost learning capabilities. The program was aimed at children from deprived backgrounds and to correlate with higher educational attainment and better GCSE results. Jarvis allocated funds to expand the scheme to other parts of the Sheffield City.

Jarvis advocated for initiatives addressing poverty and welfare through supporting food banks and preventing food insecurities by stressing the need for further government funding and local community support structures with him pointing out at partnering with charities and grassroots movements. In 2019, Jarvis established the Sheffield City Region Co-Operative Advisory Panel, first of its kind in region, an independent board tasked with applying co-operative values to regional policy including the Local Industrial Strategy and improving public transportation.

==== Climate change ====
Jarvis implemented environmental policies aimed at combating climate change and promoting sustainability with the declaration of a Climate Emergency in November 2019, which set the stage for his ambitious environmental agenda. He committed the region to achieving net zero greenhouse gas emissions by 2040, a full decade ahead of the national target. To support the target, Jarvis introduced the Sheffield City Region's Energy Strategy in July 2020. This strategy outlined a comprehensive plan to decarbonise the region's energy system.

==== Infrastructure projects ====
Jarvis pushed forward new infrastructure projects to transform and improve the city's transport and connectivity landscape with most notably with the "Connecting Sheffield" project, which focused on promoting active travel by enhancing walking and cycling routes. The £50 million project was to ease congestion, improve air quality, and encourage a more active lifestyle among residents. The project involved creating new cycling routes, improving bus routes, and implementing Low Traffic Neighbourhoods to make the city more accessible and environmentally sustainable.

Jarvis also improved the Northern Powerhouse Rail plan, with him advocating for a £39 billion investment to enhance rail connectivity across Northern England. The plan included upgrading key rail connections and integrating the Sheffield HS2 station into the broader network. His efforts were part of a broader vision to reduce travel times, boost economic growth, and improve transport links between major northern cities.

==== COVID-19 pandemic ====
Jarvis also addressed the challenges brought about by the COVID-19 pandemic with the South Yorkshire COVID-19 Response Group to lead the region's recovery by bringing together various local institutions, including business bodies, universities, trade unions, local authorities, and community groups. The group focused on providing a coordinated response to the pandemic's impact on the economy and society, ensuring that South Yorkshire emerged resilient from the crisis. They worked on developing and lobbying for necessary support from the government to aid in recovery efforts. He also implemented the Kickstart scheme, aimed at creating job opportunities for young people affected by the pandemic. Despite initial delays in the scheme's rollout, Jarvis was vocal for the need for the government to guarantee the process for placements.

During post-pandemic, Jarvis established the South Yorkshire Renewal Fund, a £500 million program intended to stimulate infrastructure, transport and employment. This fund was funded and partly financed through borrowing against the then Conservative government's gainshare allocations. The plan allocated £300 million towards improving stalled infrastructure projects, public transportation systems, bolster the high streets and further allocating £200 million towards job creation in skills development and supporting local governments.

=== Shadow Security Minister ===
In the 2023 British shadow cabinet reshuffle, he was appointed Shadow Minister for Security.

=== Junior ministerial career (2024–2026) ===
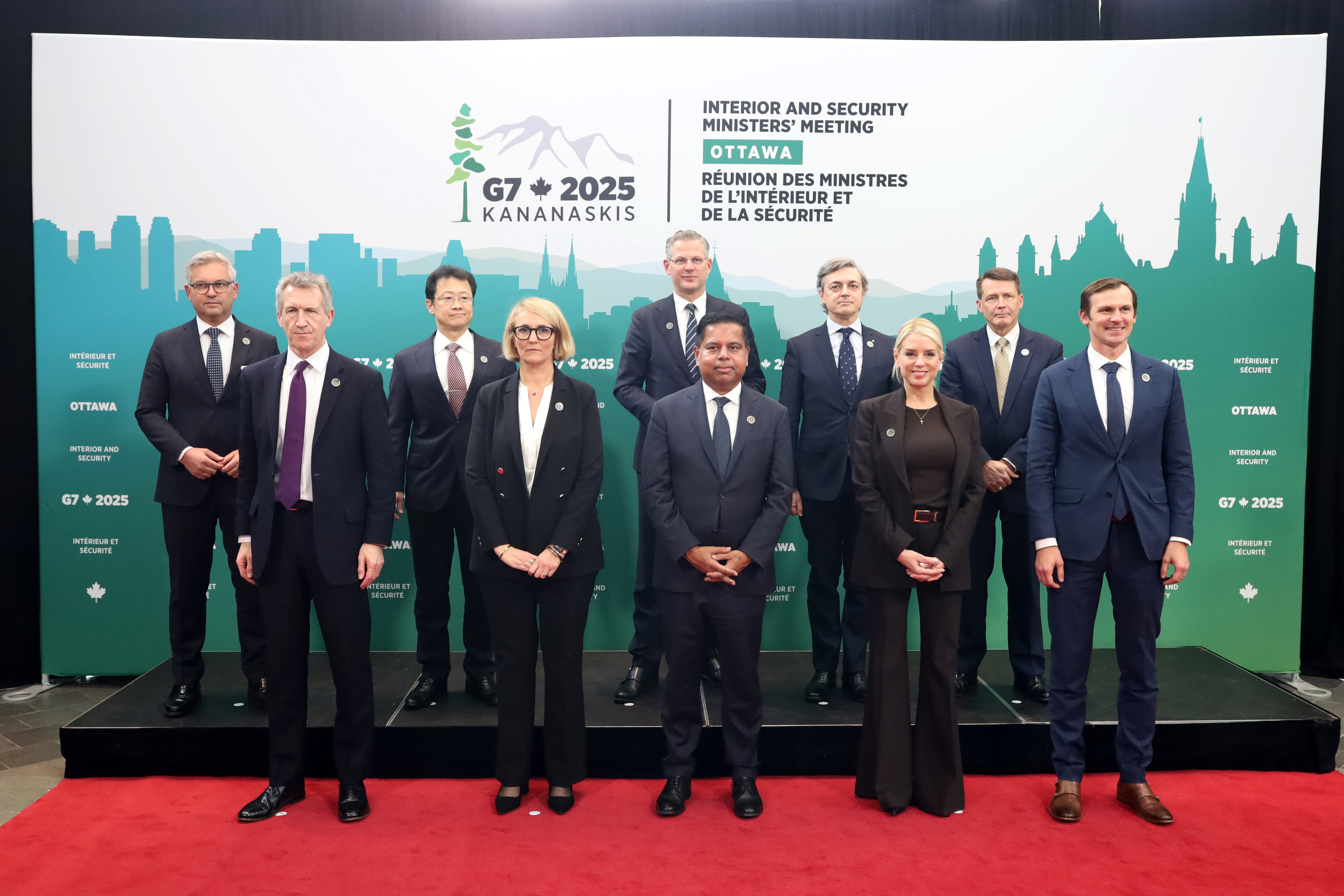
Jarvis (standing front far left) at G7 Interior and Security Ministers' meeting in Ottawa in November 2025.

Following the Labour Party's landslide victory in the 2024 general election, Jarvis was appointed Minister of State for Security by Prime Minister Keir Starmer following the formation of the new cabinet on 5 July. He was one of six MPs from the region of Yorkshire to be appointed to the cabinet.

On 9 July 2024, three women in Bushey, Hertfordshire were killed in a crossbow attack in their home by 26-year-old Kyle Clifford. Following the tragedy, Jarvis called the attack "devastating" and offered condolences to the victims' family. Jarvis said that it was "entirely reasonable" to question current laws on the appropriate use of weapons and that ministers would act "decisively" if the laws needed to be changed. When asked whether laws on deadly weapons should be tightened, Jarvis said that the Home Secretary Yvette Cooper was "very carefully" examining proposals for evidence.

Jarvis was additionally appointed Minister of State in the Cabinet Office in September 2025.

=== Secretary of State for Defence (2026) ===
On 11 June 2026, Jarvis was appointed as Secretary of State for Defence following the resignation of John Healey over a row with Prime Minister Keir Starmer over military spending. This Cabinet position promoted him from his former ministerial position as security minister in the Home Office to a senior frontbench minister in charge of the British MoD and Armed Forces. This appointment also followed the same-day resignations of Armed Forces Minister, Al Carns, and the resignation of the parliamentary private secretary at the Ministry of Defence, Pamela Nash.

=== Security minister (2026–present) ===
On 21 July 2026, Jarvis was demoted by Andy Burnham and returned to his previous roles as security and cabinet office minister.

== Political positions ==
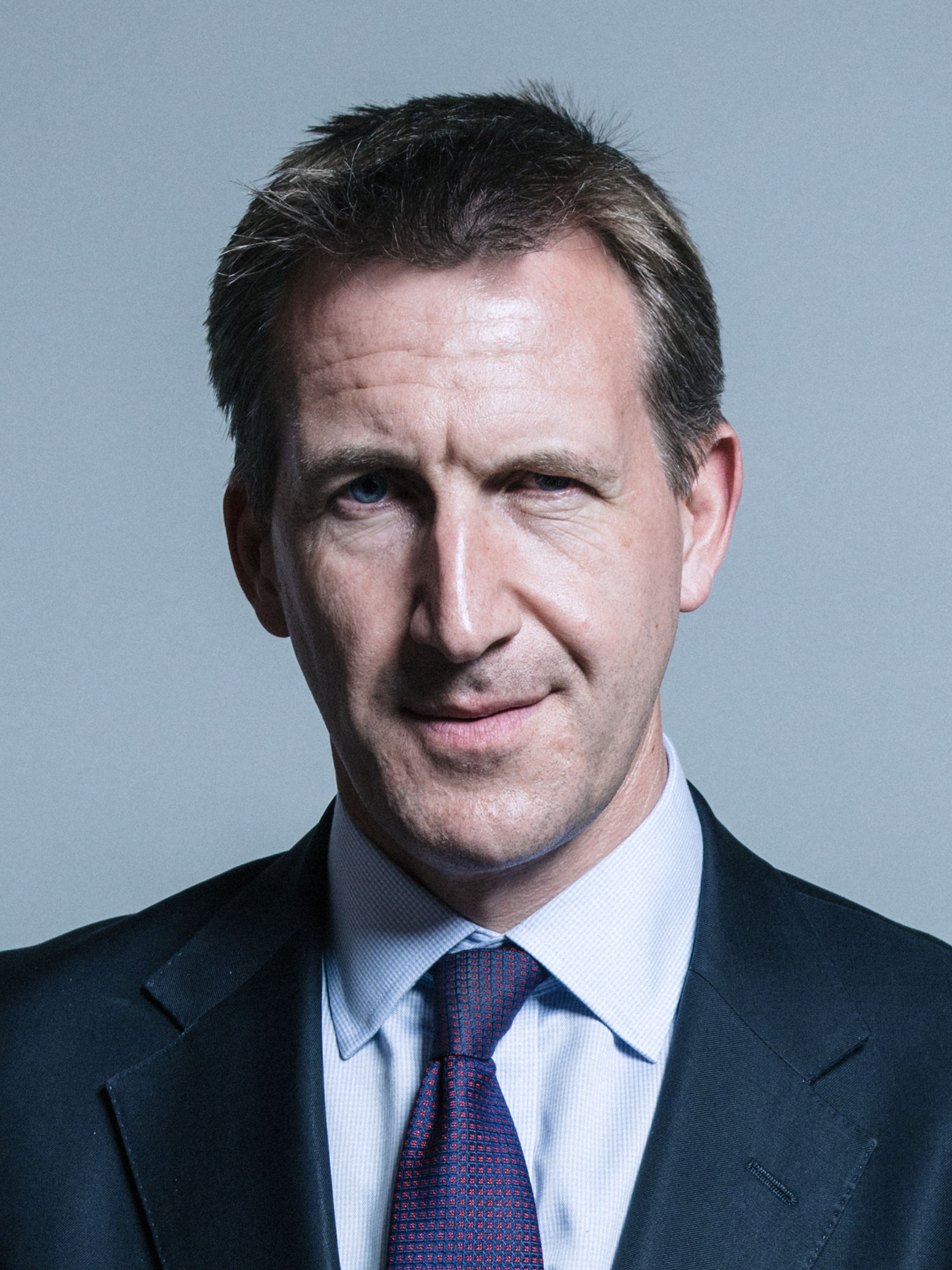
Official portrait, 2017

Jarvis voted along with 66 other Labour MPs for military action in Syria against ISIL in December 2015, arguing that the decision was "finely balanced" but that he did not believe the UK could pursue existing operations against ISIS without being able to attack ISIS's command centres on the other side of the Syrian border. He had previously opposed military action against the Assad regime in Syria in 2013.

Jarvis campaigned for a remain vote in the European Union membership referendum; his constituency voted heavily in favour of Brexit. Jarvis voted to trigger Article 50, stating that the referendum result and his constituents' views must be respected.

Jarvis is a supporter of Labour Friends of Israel.

== Personal life ==
Jarvis met his first wife, Caroline, in 2000, when she was working as a personal chef for the family of General Sir Mike Jackson. Their first child was born in 2003, three days before Jarvis was deployed to Iraq; their second child was born in 2004. Caroline Jarvis was diagnosed with bowel cancer in 2006; she died at the age of 43 in July 2010. In 2013 Jarvis married a freelance graphic designer, Rachel Jarvis, and the couple had a child.

Jarvis' memoir, A Long Way Home, was published in 2020. It chronicles his time in the British Army and how he dealt with the diagnosis and untimely death of his first wife. It was named Best Memoir at the Parliamentary Book Awards 2020.

He has run the London Marathon since 2010.

== Honours ==
Member of the Order of the British Empire (MBE)	
NATO Medal for Kosovo	
General Service Medal	
Iraq Medal	
OSM for Afghanistan	
Queen Elizabeth II Golden Jubilee Medal	2002

Jarvis was sworn of the Privy Council of the United Kingdom on 15 June 2026 at as part of his appointment as Secretary of State for Defence, entitling him to be styled as "the Right Honourable" for life.

Parliament of the United Kingdom
Preceded by Eric Illsley	Member of Parliament for Barnsley Central; 2011–2024	Constituency abolished
New constituency	Member of Parliament for Barnsley North; 2024–present	Incumbent
Political offices
Preceded by John Healey	Secretary of State for Defence; 2026	Succeeded by Wes Streeting
