= Mayor of South Yorkshire =

British government office

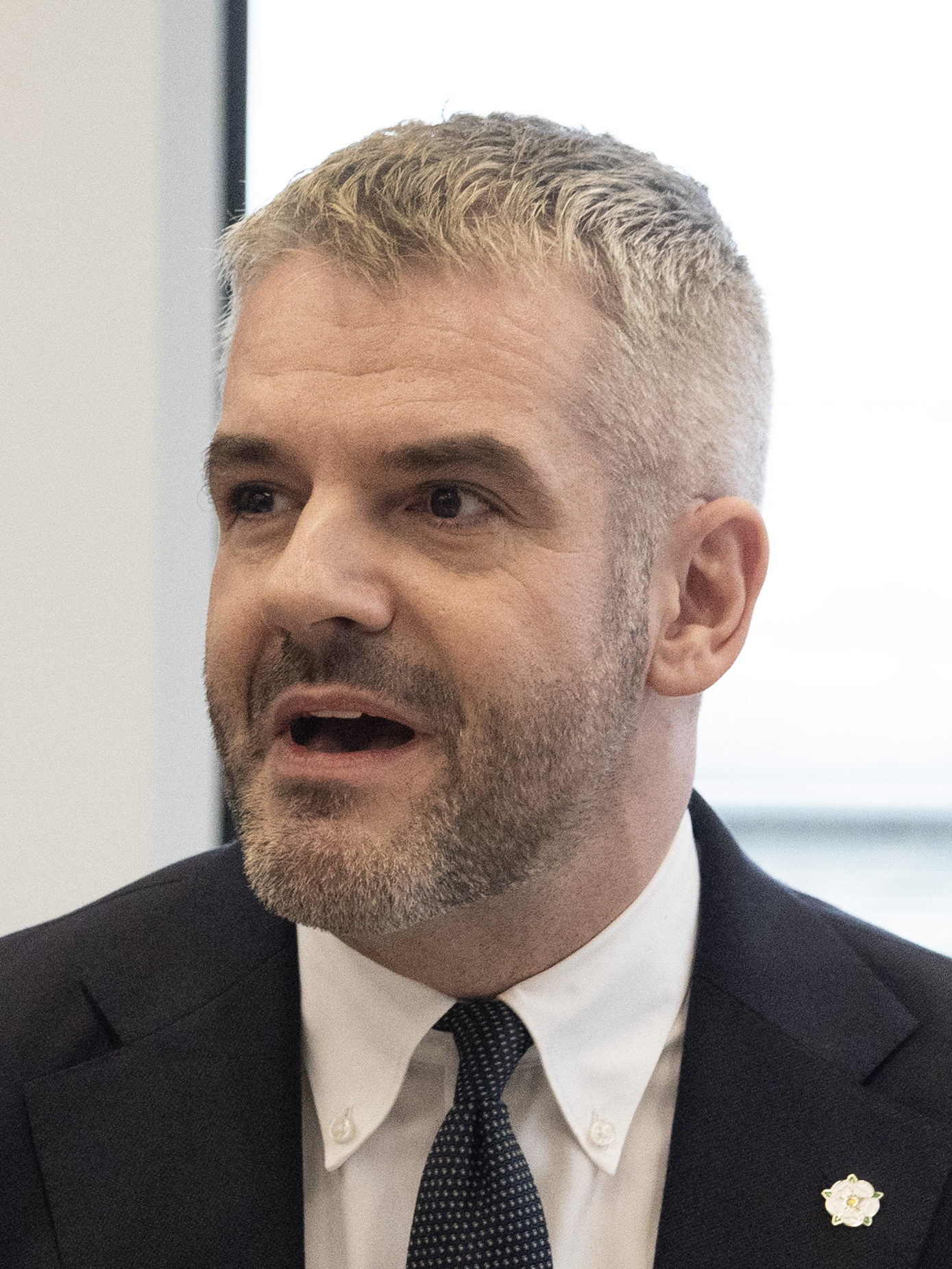
- Incumbent; Oliver Coppard since 9 May 2022
- Style: Mayor
- Appointer: Electorate of South Yorkshire
- Term length: 4 years
- Salary: £107,000

The Mayor of South Yorkshire is a strategic authority mayor, first elected in May 2018, who chairs the South Yorkshire Mayoral Combined Authority. The office is currently held by Oliver Coppard.

The office was created under the Cities and Local Government Devolution Act 2016 which allowed for the creation of 'Metro mayors' to lead combined authorities in England. Between 2018 and September 2021, the office was known as the "Mayor of the Sheffield City Region". The next election will take place in 2028.

== Powers and responsibilities ==
=== Policing and crime ===
The South Yorkshire Police and Crime Commissioner was an elected official tasked with supervising South Yorkshire Police. The position, which replaced the South Yorkshire Police Authority, was created in November 2012, following an election held on 15 November 2012, and was first held by Shaun Wright. As of the election result of the mayor in 2024, the role is incorporated into the Mayor's responsibilities, with the power to appoint a deputy mayor to support in this role.

Between May 2024 and May 2025, the functions of the PCC were performed by the Mayor directly. In May 2025, Oliver Coppard appointed Kilvinder Vigurs as Deputy Mayor for Policing and Crime of South Yorkshire.

South Yorkshire Police and Crime Commissioner
Name	Term start	Term end
Alan Billings	4 November 2021	2 May 2024
Mayor of South Yorkshire (performing functions)
Name	Term start	Term end
Oliver Coppard	2 May 2024	15 May 2025
Deputy Mayor for Policing and Crime of South Yorkshire
Name	Term start	Term end
Kilvinder Vigurs	15 May 2025	

=== Intergovernmental relations ===
The mayor is a member of the Mayoral Council for England and the Council of the Nations and Regions.

== List of mayors ==
Name	Picture	Term of office		Elected	Political party
Dan Jarvis		7 May 2018	8 May 2022	2018	Labour and Co-operative
Oliver Coppard		9 May 2022	Incumbent	2022; 2024	Labour and Co-operative
