= South Yorkshire Mayoral Combined Authority =

Strategic authority and combined authority in England

- Location in England

Type
- Type: Combined authority
- Houses: Unicameral
- Term limits: None

Leadership
- Mayor: Oliver Coppard, Labour and Co-operative since 6 May 2022
- Chief Executive: Katharine Hammond since 2025

Structure
- Seats: 5 members + observers
- Graph of the party split among 5 seats.
- Committees: Transport

Elections
- Voting system: Indirect election, directly elected metro-mayor from 2018
- Last election: 2 May 2024
- Next election: 4 May 2028

Meeting place
- Broad Street West, Sheffield

Website
- southyorkshire-ca.gov.uk

The South Yorkshire Mayoral Combined Authority (SYMCA) is the combined authority for South Yorkshire in England, with powers over transport (public transport and major trunk roads only), economic development and regeneration. It covers a total area of 3,484 km^{2} (1,345 square miles) with a population of 1.4 million. The four metropolitan boroughs of South Yorkshire – Sheffield, Rotherham, Doncaster and Barnsley – are full members of the authority, while the Derbyshire Dales, North East Derbyshire, Chesterfield and Bolsover districts of Derbyshire, and the Bassetlaw district of Nottinghamshire, are non-constituent members.

The authority's first mayoral election took place on Thursday 3 May 2018, coinciding with the 2018 United Kingdom local elections.

Until 16 September 2021, the statutory name of the combined authority was the Barnsley, Doncaster, Rotherham and Sheffield Combined Authority (though it was never branded as such). Between April 2014 and May 2018, the combined authority was branded as the Sheffield City Region Combined Authority, and between May 2018 and September 2021 as the Sheffield City Region Mayoral Combined Authority. On 17 September 2021, both its legal name and its brand name changed to the South Yorkshire Mayoral Combined Authority.

== History ==
Districts of South Yorkshire Combined Authority: 1. Sheffield; 2. Rotherham; 3. Doncaster; 4. Barnsley

Districts making up the wider Sheffield City Region: 5. Chesterfield; 6. NE Derbyshire; 7. Bolsover; 8. Bassetlaw; 9. Derbyshire Dales

The Sheffield City Region was one of eight city regions defined in the 2004 document Moving Forward: The Northern Way, as a collaboration between the three northern regional development agencies.

In September 2006, the local authorities comprising the Sheffield City Region launched the Sheffield City Region Development Programme. This set out how the local authorities believed that by working together as a city region they could increase the economic output of the area by 12.6% by 2016.

It also described governance structures for the city region, including a City Region Forum (consisting of the Leaders of each of the constituent authorities, including the two county councils and the Peak District National Park Authority, along with observers from the two Regional Development Agencies and Government Offices covering the city region). The City Region Forum has since been formally established, and has resolved to set up four thematic Joint Issue Boards to take forward some of the propositions made in the City Region Development Programme. The four Joint Issue Boards cover transport; Residential Offer (Housing Supply and Demand); Destination Management (Tourism and Inward Investment); and Knowledge Economy and Innovation.

The region began its work properly in 2008, with a development forum created. This was to be headed up by Sylvia Yates, the former director of South Yorkshire Objective One European grants programme before the European funding was lost.

=== Combined Authority ===
The Combined Authority was established by statutory instrument under the Local Democracy, Economic Development and Construction Act 2009 on 1 April 2014. The statutory name of the authority is the Barnsley, Doncaster, Rotherham and Sheffield Combined Authority.

A devolution deal was agreed between the government and the Combined Authority in 2015 which committed £900 million for the region and a directly elected mayor of the Sheffield City Region from 2017 onwards.

Following legal action from Derbyshire County Council regarding the inclusion of Derbyshire local authorities, and the withdrawal of Bassetlaw and Chesterfield councils mid-2017, the first mayoral election was delayed until 2018.

==== Naming ====
As part of the consultation process for the new authority, the UK government suggested the name South Yorkshire Combined Authority, which was rejected by the authorities who favoured the name Sheffield City Region Combined Authority. The government rejected this name as "misleading and inappropriate". The order presented to parliament to create the authority referred to it as the Barnsley, Doncaster, Rotherham, and Sheffield Combined Authority. The authority subsequently used the corporate name Sheffield City Region Combined Authority between April 2014 and May 2018 when it adopted the name Sheffield City Region Mayoral Combined Authority. In June 2021, the authority agreed to assume the name South Yorkshire Mayoral Combined Authority (SYMCA), which was enacted in September 2021.

==== Police and crime commissioner ====
The mayor was vested with the police and crime commissioner functions for the South Yorkshire Police area from 7 May 2024.

== Combined authority membership ==
The combined authority consists of the four local authorities of South Yorkshire and the directly elected mayor as constituent members, and the other authorities in the Sheffield City Region as non-constituent partners. Membership numbers are weighted to ensure a majority of South Yorkshire members, and non-constituent members may be excluded from some votes. The mayor is a member of the Mayoral Council for England and the Council of the Nations and Regions.

The membership of the combined authority is as follows (as of June 2026):

Name	Position within nominating authority	Nominating authority
Directly elected members
Oliver Coppard	Mayor of South Yorkshire	Electorate of South Yorkshire
Constituent members
William Brown	Leader of the council	Barnsley Metropolitan Borough Council
Ros Jones	Mayor of Doncaster	City of Doncaster Council
Chris Read	Leader of the council	Rotherham Metropolitan Borough Council
Fran Belbin	Leader of the council	Sheffield City Council
Non-constituent partners
Jonathan Slater	Deputy leader of the council	Bassetlaw District Council
Jane Yates	Leader of the council	Bolsover District Council
Tricia Gilby	Leader of the council	Chesterfield Borough Council
Simon Ripton	Council member	Derbyshire Dales District Council
Nigel Barker	Leader of the council	North East Derbyshire District Council

First elected on 3 May 2018

== Local enterprise partnership ==
South Yorkshire combined authority area (dark green) and Sheffield City Region Local Enterprise Partnership area (green) within England

The Sheffield City Region Local Enterprise Partnership was established in 2012. The local enterprise partnership covered the nine local authority areas. The Sheffield City Region Enterprise Zone included sites spread over Barnsley, Doncaster, Rotherham, Sheffield and Markham Vale, Derbyshire. In August 2011 the government announced the creation of the zone, which included the existing Advanced Manufacturing Park in Rotherham. The zone was actually set up in 2012. In March 2014 more sites were added, increasing the zone's total area by around half. These included the addition of a site at Doncaster Sheffield Airport. Local enterprise partnerships were abolished in 2024.

== See also ==
- Travel South Yorkshire
