= 2022 South Yorkshire mayoral election =

2022 local election in England

- 5 May 2022
- Turnout: 26.4% ▲0.5%
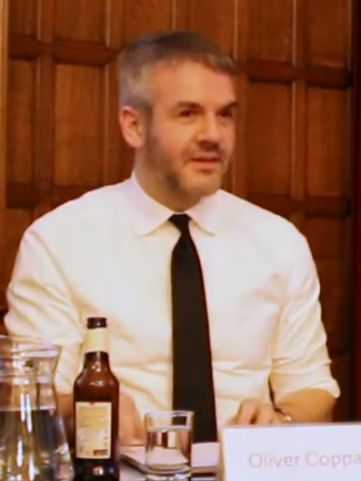

Candidate	Oliver Coppard	Clive Watkinson	Simon Biltcliffe
Party	Labour Co-op	Conservative	Yorkshire
First Round	112,517	43,129	34,857
Percentage	43.1%	16.5%	13.4%
Swing	▼4.9pp	▲1.8pp	▲4.6pp
Second Round	143,476	57,347	Eliminated
Percentage	71.4%	28.6%	Eliminated
Swing	▼2.6pp	▲2.6pp	Eliminated
Candidate	Bex Whyman	Joe Otten
Party	Green	Liberal Democrats
First Round	32,322	28,093
Percentage	12.4%	10.8%
Swing	▲4.4pp	▲0.1pp
Second Round	Eliminated	Eliminated
Percentage	Eliminated	Eliminated
Swing	Eliminated	Eliminated
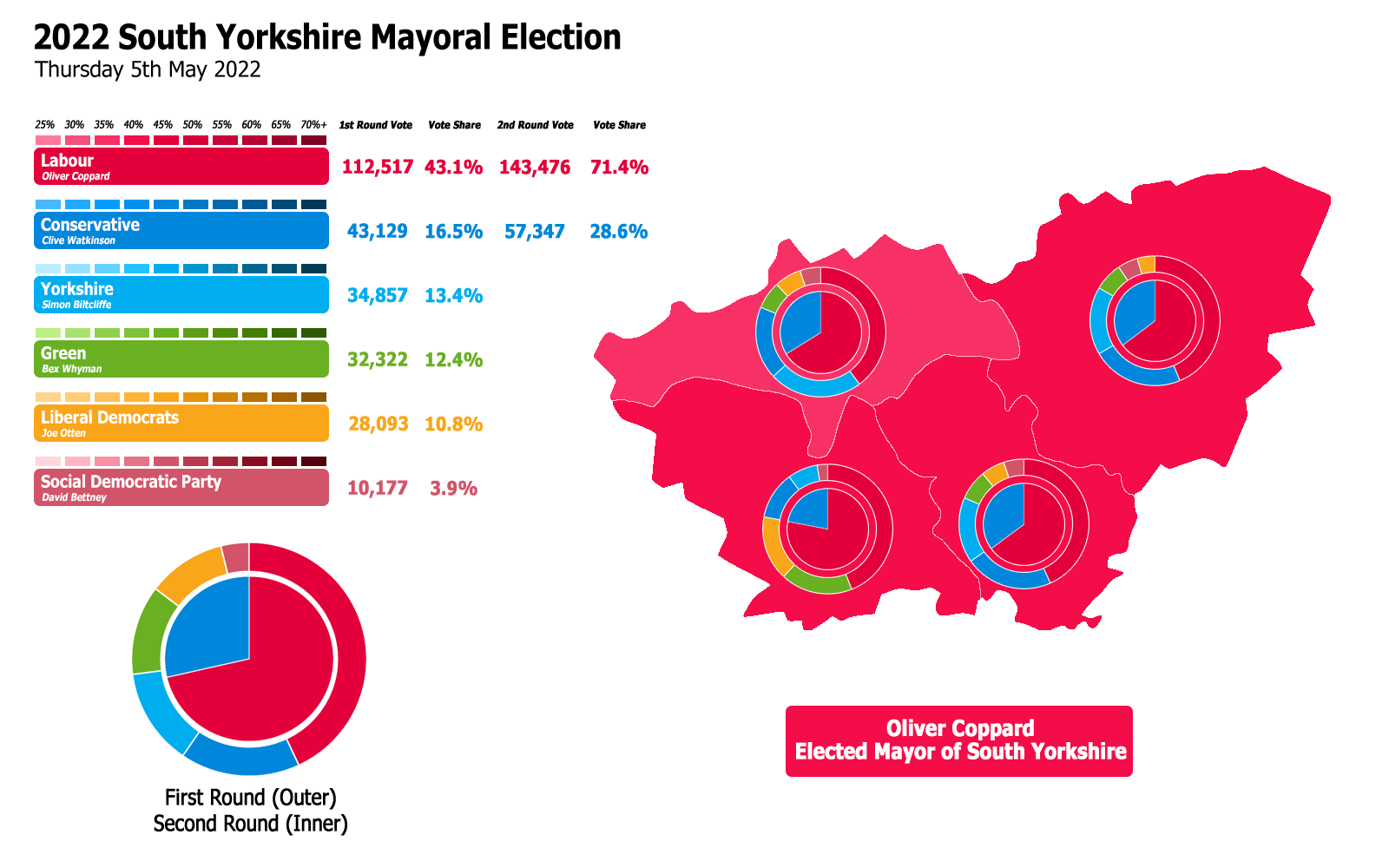
- A map showing the results of the election by local authority.

The 2022 South Yorkshire mayoral election took place on 5 May 2022 to elect the Mayor of South Yorkshire, the leader of the South Yorkshire Mayoral Combined Authority. It took place alongside other local elections across the United Kingdom. The Labour and Co-operative Party candidate, Oliver Coppard, won the election in the second round with 71.4% of the vote.

== Background ==
In 2018, The South Yorkshire metro mayor position – then known as the Sheffield City Region – had its inaugural election. At the time of its creation, the metro mayor's role was an effectively powerless position, with no salary. It was named this originally because its boundaries went beyond the four boroughs of South Yorkshire and included some parts of Derbyshire and Nottinghamshire. However, these areas did not become constituent parts. Its lack of power was because the borough councils of Doncaster and Barnsley opposed the creation of the mayoralty and the combined authority (then Sheffield City Region Combined Authority). They instead favoured a 'One Yorkshire' devolution deal, which would have a Mayor for all of Yorkshire in 2020. Dan Jarvis, MP for Barnsley Central won this role with at second preferences. He has remained as a Member of Parliament during this term.

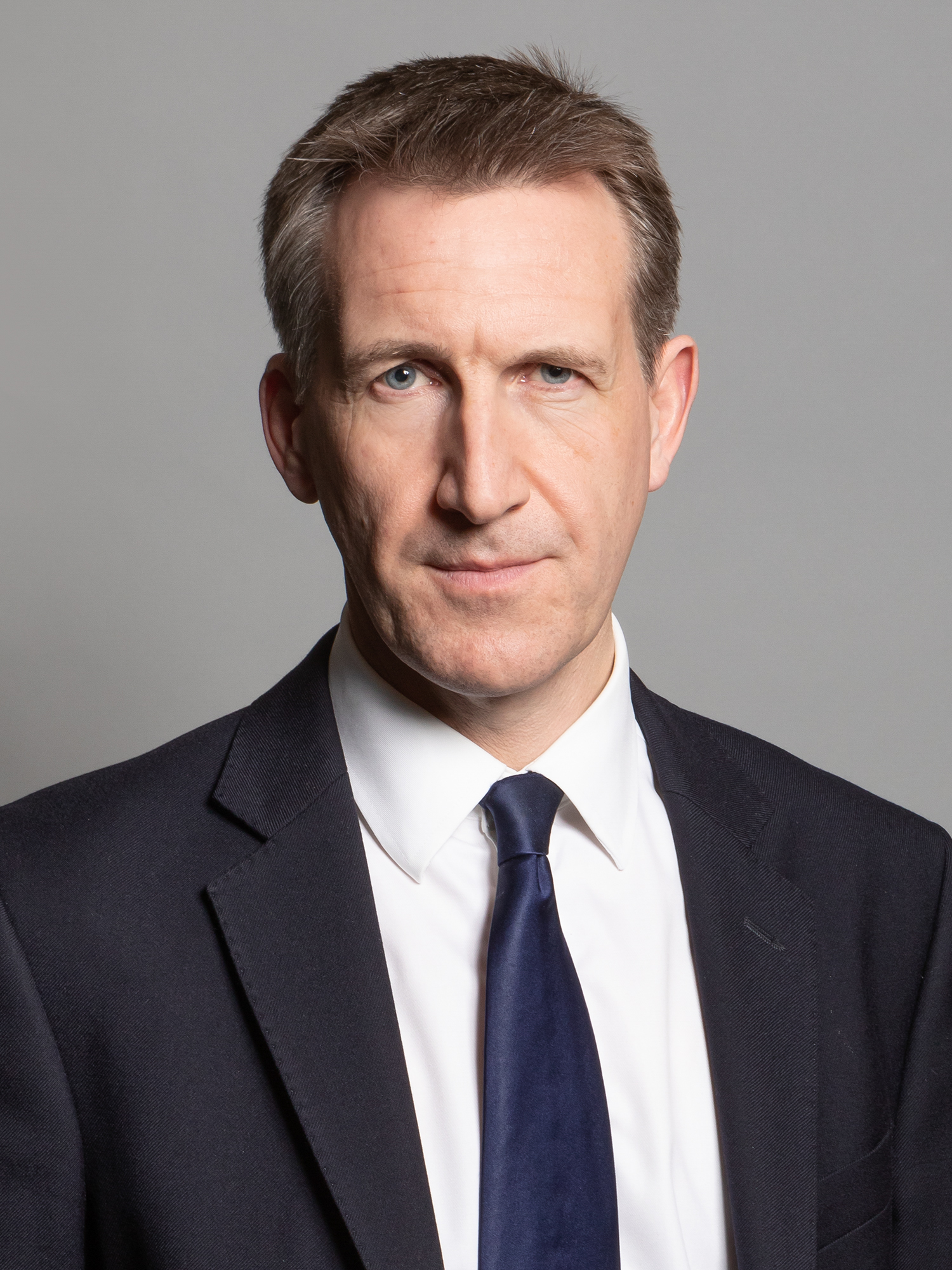
Dan Jarvis was elected in the 2018 election and announced he wouldn't seek a second term in late 2021.

In late-2019, Jarvis secured a deal between the four boroughs, the combined authority and the British government. In 2020, the role was provided with a salary and statutory powers, this was fully implemented by 2021. These powers include: transport, strategic planning, coordinating investment and skills as well as £30 million annual funding for 30 years. Jarvis reportedly does not take the salary and donates it.

Think Tank IPPR has reported that the mayor, much like other metro mayors in the North of England have utilised power beyond the remit given by the government. In South Yorkshire, for instance, the country's first 'ownership hub' was built to help businesses become worker owned or co-operatives. Controversy arose in June 2021 when Jarvis' administration voted to continue a privatised bus service in South Yorkshire, despite previous pledges to bring it into public control.

In February 2024 it was announced by Westminster that the role of Police and Crime Commissioner would be moved to that of the Mayor of South Yorkshire, the addition of these powers mean it is considered a 'new role' therefore needs to be voted on again effectively halving the term of current Mayor Oliver Coppard.

The election was held alongside other local elections on 2 May 2024, with the new term running until 2028

== Electoral system ==
South Yorkshire, along with other elected mayoralties in England, will use the supplementary vote system, in which voters express a first and second preference of candidates.

- If a candidate receives over 50% of the first preference vote the candidate wins.
- If no candidate receives an overall majority, i.e., over 50% of first preference votes, the top two candidates proceed to a second round and all other candidates are eliminated.
- The first preference votes for the remaining two candidates stand in the final count.
- Voters' ballots whose first and second preference candidates are eliminated are discarded.
- Voters whose first preference candidates have been eliminated and whose second preference candidate is in the top two have their second preference votes added to the count.

This means that the winning candidate has the support of a majority of voters who expressed a preference among the top two.

All registered electors (British, Irish, Commonwealth and European Union citizens) living in the combined authority area aged 18 or over on 5 May 2022 are entitled to vote in the mayoral election.

Speculation has circulated that the government may remove the supplementary vote system which mayoralties use and replace it with first-past-the-post- in line with general elections.

== Candidates ==
Oliver Coppard was selected as the Labour and Co-operative Party candidate for the election. Dan Jarvis confirmed in September 2021 that he will not stand for a second term in the mayoralty in 2022. Seven candidates applied for selection, which was narrowed down to a setlist of four candidates: Rachael Blake, Lewis Dagnall, Oliver Coppard and Jayne Dunn. The voting period for Labour members took place in January 2022. On 26 January, Oliver Coppard was announced as their candidate.

Simon Biltcliffe, an entrepreneur from Barnsley, was announced as the Yorkshire Party candidate on 22 October 2021.

The Green Party selected Bex Whyman as their candidate for mayor on 20 December 2021.

The Conservative Party selected Clive Watkinson as their candidate.

The Liberal Democrats selected Joe Otten, a Sheffield councillor, as their candidate on 29th March.

The Social Democratic Party selected David Bettney as their candidate on the 4 April 2022. He was endorsed by Reform UK.

== Results ==
South Yorkshire Mayoral Election 2022
Party	Candidate	1st round		2nd round			1st round votesTransfer votes, 2nd round
Party	Candidate	Total	Of round	Transfers	Total	Of round	1st round votesTransfer votes, 2nd round
Labour Co-op	Oliver Coppard	112,517	43.1%	30,959	143,476	71.4%	
Conservative	Clive Watkinson	43,129	16.5%	14,218	57,347	28.6%	
Yorkshire	Simon Biltcliffe	34,857	13.4%				
Green	Bex Whyman	32,322	12.4%				
Liberal Democrats	Joe Otten	28,093	10.8%				
SDP	David Bettney	10,177	3.9%				
Majority					86,129	42.8%	
Turnout		264,720	26.4%	Rejected ballots: 3,622			
Labour Co-op hold							
