= 2024 South Yorkshire mayoral election =

2024 English mayoral election

- 2 May 2024
- Turnout: 27% ▲0.6pp
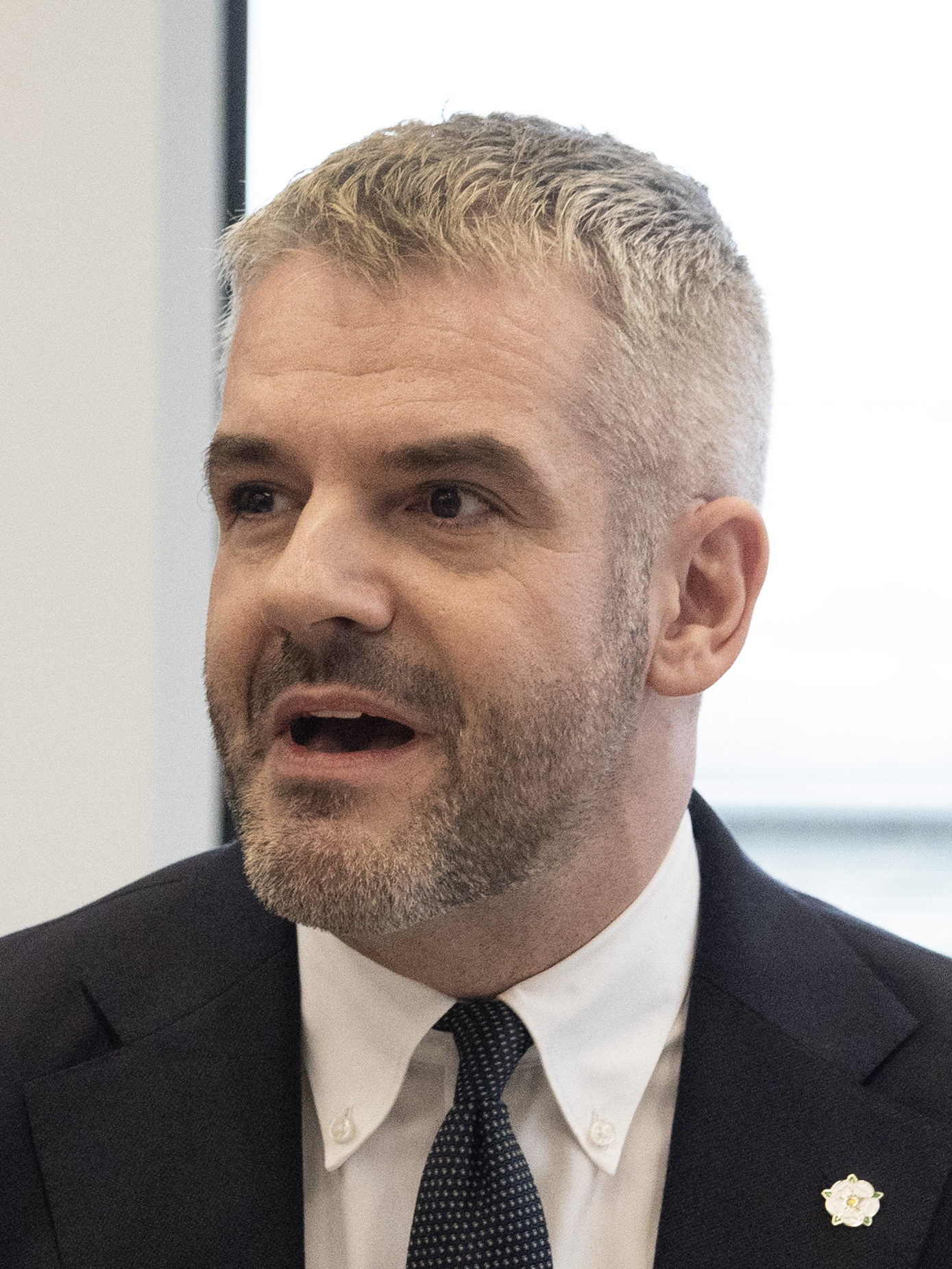

	First party	Second party	Third party
Candidate	Oliver Coppard	Nick Allen	Douglas Johnson
Party	Labour Co-op	Conservative	Green
Popular vote	138,611	44,945	37,142
Percentage	50.9%	16.5%	13.6%
Swing	▲7.8pp	Steady	▲1.2pp
	Fourth party	Fifth party
Candidate	Hannah Kitching	David Bettney
Party	Liberal Democrats	SDP
Popular vote	31,002	20,835
Percentage	11.4%	7.6%
Swing	▲0.6pp	▲3.7pp
- Election results by local authorities

The 2024 South Yorkshire mayoral election was held on 2 May 2024 to elect the mayor of South Yorkshire as part of the 2024 United Kingdom local elections. The incumbent Labour and Co-operative Party mayor, Oliver Coppard, was re-elected.

== Background ==
Oliver Coppard was elected as the second mayor of South Yorkshire in the 2022 South Yorkshire mayoral election. After consultation, the role was merged with the coterminous police and crime commissioner. This meant that rather than taking place in 2026, as previously scheduled, an early election was held on 2 May 2024.

== Campaign ==
Nick Allen, the Conservative candidate, said he would reopen Doncaster Sheffield Airport.

David Bettney, the SDP candidate, campaigned to reduce council tax, reopen Doncaster Sheffield Airport and demanded a full financial audit on all four South Yorkshire councils covering the past 25 years. He was endorsed by Reform UK.

== Candidates ==
=== Labour and Co-operative ===
Oliver Coppard, the incumbent mayor, was re-elected.

=== Conservative ===
The Conservative Party selected Nick Allen, a councillor on the City of Doncaster Council, as its candidate.

=== Green Party ===
Douglas Johnson, leader of the Green group on Sheffield City Council.

=== Social Democratic Party ===
David Bettney is a businessman and former Regimental Sergeant Major.

=== Liberal Democrats ===
Hannah Kitching is the leader of the opposition in the Barnsley Council.

== Results ==
2024 South Yorkshire mayoral election
Party	Candidate	Votes	%	±%
Labour Co-op	Oliver Coppard	138,611	50.9	+7.8
Conservative	Nick Allen	44,948	16.5	±0.0
Green	Douglas Johnson	37,142	13.6	+4.1
Liberal Democrats	Hannah Kitching	31,002	11.4	+0.6
SDP	David Bettney	20,835	7.6	+3.7
Majority		93,666	34.4	+7.8
Turnout		272,535	27.3	+0.9
Labour Co-op hold		Swing	+3.9	

Districts	Oliver Coppard Lab Co-op		Nick Allen Con		Douglas Johnson Green		Hannah Kitching Lib Dems		David Bettney SDP		Total valid votes
Districts	#	%	#	%	#	%	#	%	#	%	#
Barnsley	21,896	49.80%	5,708	12.98%	3,504	7.97%	7,958	18.10%	4,899	11.14%	43,965
Doncaster	24,111	50.95%	13,587	28.71%	2,831	5.98%	2,039	4.31%	4,754	10.05%	47,322
Rotherham	25,642	46.68%	13,568	24.70%	6,228	11.34%	4,755	8.66%	4,739	8.63%	54,932
Sheffield	66,962	53.01%	12,085	9.57%	24,579	19.46%	16,250	12.86%	6,443	5.10%	126,319
Totals	138,611	50.86%	44,948	16.49%	37,142	13.63%	31,002	11.38%	20,835	7.64%	272,538

== See also ==
- People's Republic of South Yorkshire
