= 2021 England and Wales police and crime commissioner elections =

Elections held in May 2021 in England and Wales

2021 Police and crime commissioner elections
- 6 May 2021

39 police and crime commissioners in England and Wales 3 Combined Authority Mayors with PCC powers
- Turnout: 34.1%(▲7.5%)
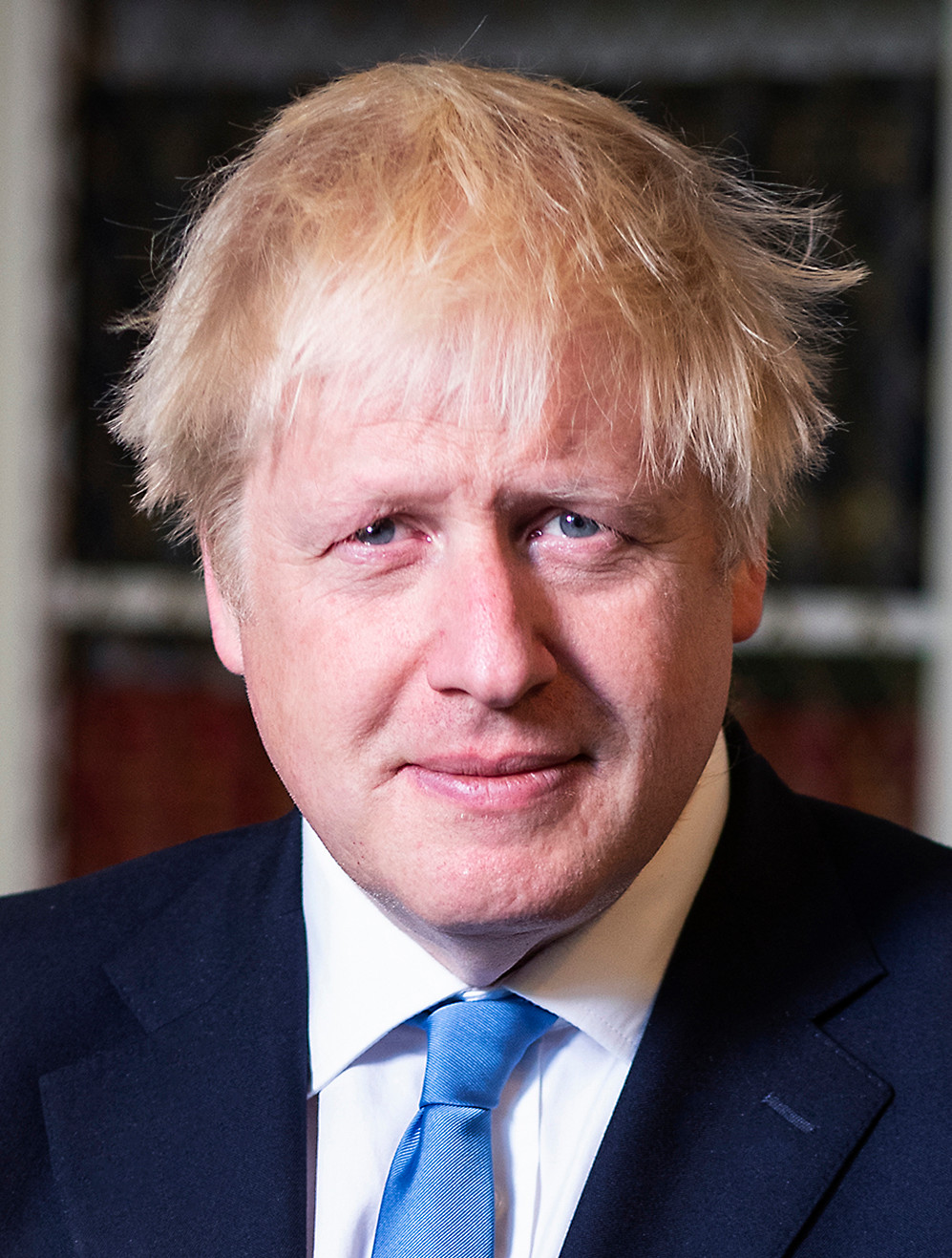

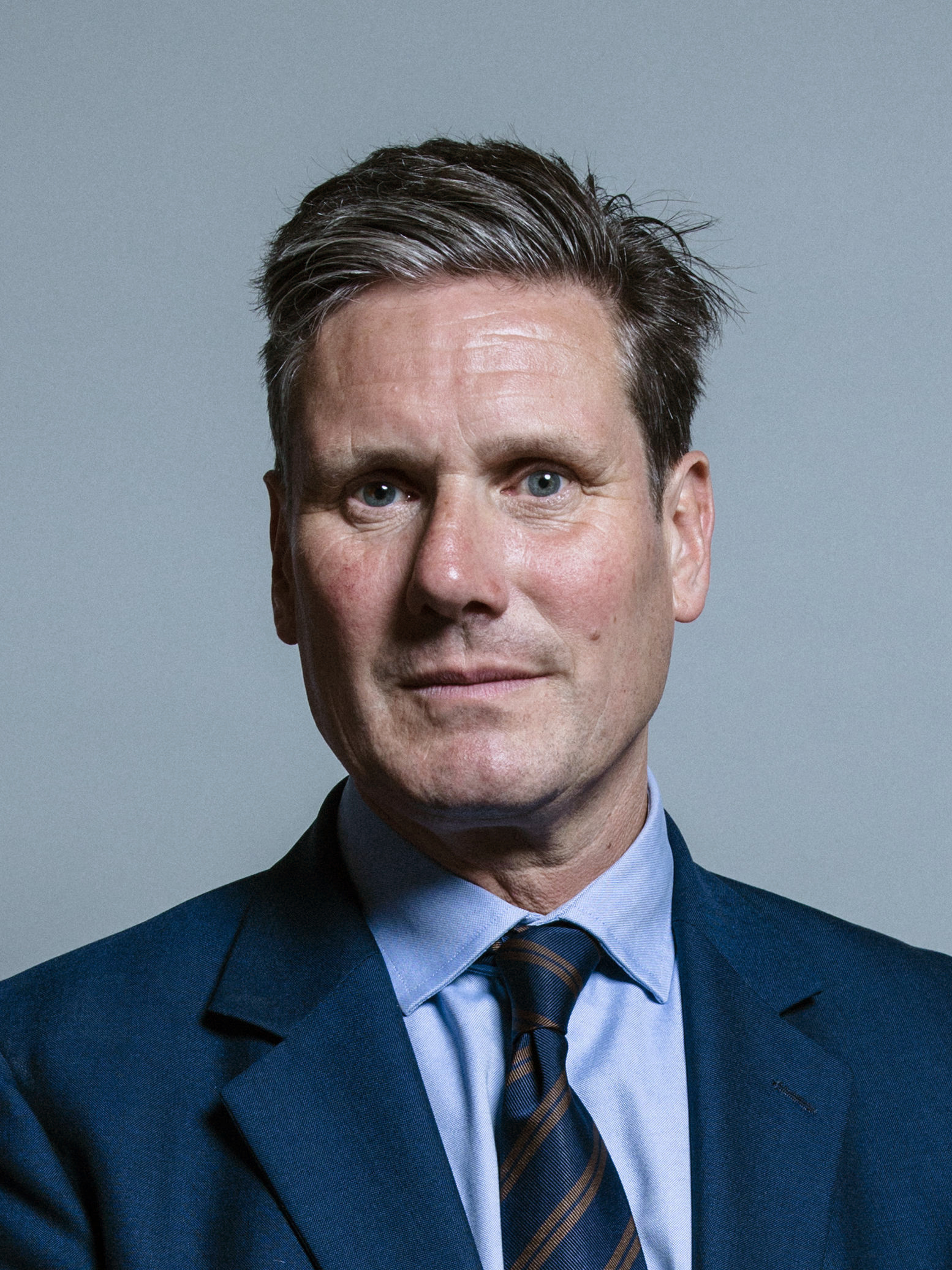

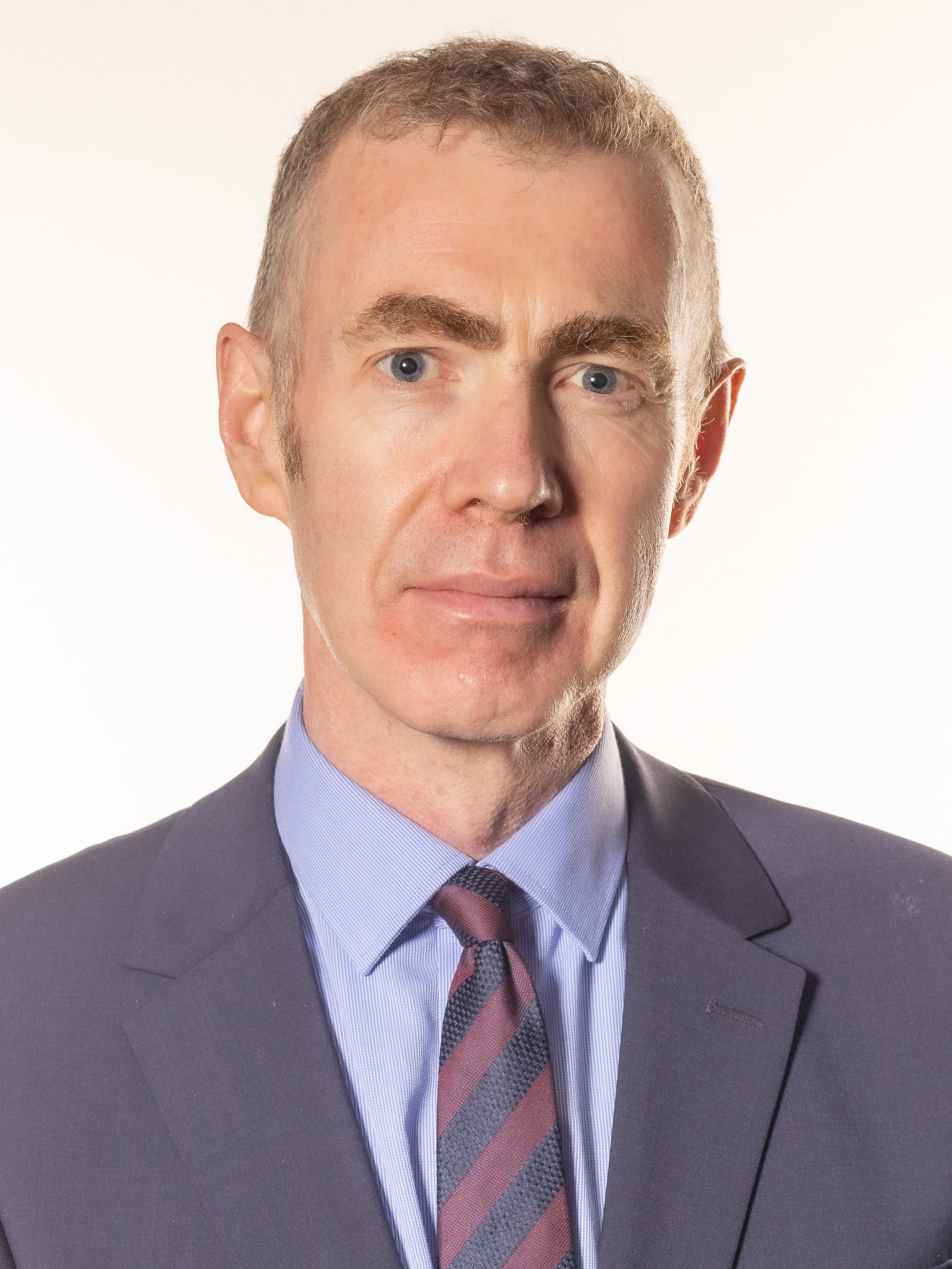
	First party	Second party	Third party
Leader	Boris Johnson	Keir Starmer	Adam Price
Party	Conservative	Labour	Plaid Cymru
Leader since	23 July 2019	4 April 2020	28 September 2018
Last election	20 seats, 30.2%	17 seats, 37.8%	2 seats, 1.9%
Seats before	20	16	2
PCCs	30	11 (Note: Includes 3 Metro Mayors with PCC powers.)	1
Change	▲10	▼6	▼1
Popular vote	6,107,472	5,164,376	247,518
Share	40.6%	34.3%	1.6%
Swing	▲10.4%	▼3.5%	▼0.3%
- The 39 police force areas within England and Wales where elections were held. This is a reduction of one since 2016 with West Yorkshire Police being handed to the Mayor of West Yorkshire in 2021. Colours denote the winning party, as shown in the main table of results.

Elections of police and crime commissioners in England and Wales were held on 6 May 2021, on the same day as the Senedd election in Wales and the local elections in England. This was the third time police and crime commissioner elections have been held (the two previous occasions were in 2012 and 2016). The elections were originally due to take place in May 2020 but were postponed by 12 months in view of the COVID-19 pandemic. Turnout was an average of 34.1% across the elections, with Wales having much higher turnout reportedly due to the simultaneous Senedd election held across Wales, whereas only parts of England had simultaneous local elections.

The criminal justice system and the legal jurisdiction of England and Wales are reserved (non-devolved) matters, which fall under the control of the UK parliament and government at Westminster. The criminal justice systems of Scotland and Northern Ireland are devolved.

== Background ==
Areas shown in blue elected a police and crime commissioner; areas in orange elected a police, fire and crime commissioner.

Police and crime commissioners (PCCs) are elected representatives with responsibility for policing in each police area in England and Wales. Each police area — with the exception of Greater London, Greater Manchester, and West Yorkshire, where the directly elected mayor is the policing authority instead — elects a commissioner every four years.

Police and Crime Commissioner elections use the supplementary vote system.

This was the third set of police and crime commissioner elections to be held. The role was created by the Police Reform and Social Responsibility Act 2011 and the first elections were held in November 2012.

The Policing and Crime Act 2017, which amended the 2011 Act, enabled PCCs to take over governance of the local fire and rescue service. PCCs who have taken on these responsibilities are known as Police Fire and Crime Commissioners (PFCCs). There are currently four PFCCs:

- Staffordshire (Created 1 August 2018.)
- Essex (Created 1 October 2018.)
- Northamptonshire (Created 15 November 2018.)
- North Yorkshire (Created 1 January 2019.)

=== Postponement to 2021 ===
Owing to the COVID-19 pandemic, the elections due to be held in May 2020 were delayed until May 2021; this applied to the PCC elections as well as those for local authorities and elected mayors. The postponement was implemented by the Coronavirus Act 2020 which was enacted on 25 March 2020.

The act stipulates that the postponement is to be ignored in determining the years in which subsequent elections are to be held, thus the commissioners elected in 2021 will be in office for three years, not the usual four.

The office of West Yorkshire police and crime commissioner was abolished on the date of these elections, as the role was taken up by the office of the newly elected mayor of the West Yorkshire Combined Authority.

== Results summary ==
This table includes the results of elections for Combined Authority Mayors with Police and crime commissioner responsibilities which were held on the same day.

Party	Votes	Share	Change	Stood	Seats	Share	Change
Conservative	6,107,472	40.6	+10.4	42	30	71.4	+10
Labour	5,164,376	34.3	−3.5	42	11	26.2	−6
Liberal Democrats	1,671,406	11.1	+3.5	42	0	—	±0
Independent	619,578	4.1	−2.1	25	0	—	−3
Green	558,644	3.7		10	0	—	±0
Plaid Cymru	247,518	1.6	−0.3	4	1	2.4	−1
Reform	155,232	1.0	N/A	14	0	—	±0
Hampshire Ind.	68,895	0.5	N/A	1	0	—	±0
English Democrat	64,675	0.4		4	0	—	±0
Zero Tolerance	59,554	0.5		1	0	—	±0
Yorkshire	58,851	0.4		1	0	—	±0
Reclaim	47,634	0.3		1	0	—	±0
London Real	31,111	0.2		1	0	—	±0
Rejoin EU	28,012	0.2		1	0	—	±0
Count Binface	24,775	0.2		1	0	—	±0
Women's Equality	21,182	0.1		1	0	—	±0
Let London Live	20,604	0.1		1	0	—	±0
Lincolnshire Ind.	18,375	0.1		1	0	—	±0
Animal Welfare	16,826	0.1		1	0	—	±0
UKIP	14,393	0.1	-10.9	1	0	—	±0
Propel	13,263	0.1	N/A	1	0	—	±0
Heritage	11,025	0.1	N/A	1	0	—	±0
SDP	8,764	0.1	N/A	1	0	—	±0
Renew	7,774	0.1	N/A	1	0	—	±0
We Matter	7,745	0.1	N/A	1	0	—	±0
Burning Pink	5,305	0.0	N/A	1	0	—	±0
Gwlad	2,615	0.0	N/A	1	0	—	±0

== Police and crime commissioners not standing for re-election ==
Ron Hogg, the Labour PCC for Durham since 2012, died in office.

The following PCCs chose not to stand for re-election:

- Ray Bisby, Conservative acting Cambridgeshire Police and Crime Commissioner since 2019.
- Barry Coppinger, Labour Cleveland Police and Crime Commissioner since 2012.
- Kathryn Holloway, Conservative Bedfordshire Police and Crime Commissioner since 2016.
- David Jamieson, Labour West Midlands Police and Crime Commissioner since 2014.
- Arfon Jones, Plaid Cymru North Wales Police and Crime Commissioner since 2016.
- Angus Macpherson, Conservative Wiltshire Police and Crime Commissioner since 2012.
- Sue Mountstevens, Independent Avon and Somerset Police and Crime Commissioner since 2012.
- Julia Mulligan, Conservative North Yorkshire Police and Crime Commissioner since 2012.
- Anthony Stansfeld, Conservative Thames Valley Police and Crime Commissioner since 2012.
- Martyn Underhill, Independent Dorset Police and Crime Commissioner since 2012.

== England ==
Incumbent police and crime commissioners are marked with an asterisk (*).

=== Avon and Somerset Police ===
2021 Avon and Somerset police and crime commissioner election
Party	Candidate	1st round		2nd round			1st round votesTransfer votes, 2nd round
Party	Candidate	Total	Of round	Transfers	Total	Of round	1st round votesTransfer votes, 2nd round
Conservative	Mark Shelford	136,988	34.7%	24,331	161,319	52.44%	
Labour	Kerry Barker	93,495	23.7%	52,798	146,293	47.56%	
Green	Cleo Lake	64,790	16.4%				
Liberal Democrats	Heather Shearer	52,839	13.4%				
Independent	John Smith	46,379	11.8%				
Turnout		394,491					
Conservative gain from Independent							

=== Bedfordshire Police ===
2021 Bedfordshire police and crime commissioner election
Party	Candidate	1st round		2nd round			1st round votesTransfer votes, 2nd round
Party	Candidate	Total	Of round	Transfers	Total	Of round	1st round votesTransfer votes, 2nd round
Conservative	Festus Akinbusoye	51,700	42.4%	8,093	59,793	54.06%	
Labour	David Michael	42,708	35.0%	8,107	50,815	45.94%	
Liberal Democrats	Jas Parmar	15,983	13.1%				
Independent	Pat Hamil	8,279	6.8%				
English Democrat	Antonio Daniel Vitiello	3,387	2.8%				
Turnout		122,057					
Conservative hold							

=== Cambridgeshire Constabulary ===
2021 Cambridgeshire police and crime commissioner election
Party	Candidate	1st round		2nd round			1st round votesTransfer votes, 2nd round
Party	Candidate	Total	Of round	Transfers	Total	Of round	1st round votesTransfer votes, 2nd round
Conservative	Darryl Preston	99,034	42.90%	15,019	114,053	52.74%	
Labour	Nicky Massey	72,313	31.32%	29,882	102,195	47.26%	
Liberal Democrats	Rupert Moss-Eccardt	51,490	22.30%				
Reform	Sue Morris	8,031	3.48%				
Turnout		230,868					
Conservative hold							

=== Cheshire Constabulary ===
2021 Cheshire police and crime commissioner election
Party	Candidate	1st round		2nd round			1st round votesTransfer votes, 2nd round
Party	Candidate	Total	Of round	Transfers	Total	Of round	1st round votesTransfer votes, 2nd round
Conservative	John Dwyer	99,565	44.55%	12,397	111,962	52.96%	
Labour Co-op	David Keane*	83,329	37.28%	16,134	99,463	47.04%	
Liberal Democrats	Jo Conchie	32,348	14.47%				
Reform	Nick Goulding	8,258	3.69%				
Turnout		223,500					
Conservative gain from Labour							

=== Cleveland Police ===
2021 Cleveland police and crime commissioner election
Party	Candidate	Votes	%	±%
Conservative	Steve Turner	74,023	54.15	
Labour	Matt Storey	39,467	28.87	
Independent	Barrie Cooper	16,667	12.19	
Liberal Democrats	Chris Jones	6,540	4.78	
Turnout		136,697	33.7	
Rejected ballots				
Total votes				
Registered electors				
Conservative gain from Labour				

Legend
- 45-50% Turner
- 50-55% Turner
- 55-60% Turner

Paul Williams initially planned to stand for the Labour Party, but he was selected as the party's candidate for the Hartlepool parliamentary constituency by-election that was on the same day as the PCC elections, and therefore withdrew.

=== Cumbria Constabulary ===
2021 Cumbria police and crime commissioner election
Party	Candidate	Votes	%	±%
Conservative	Peter McCall*	56,753	53.57	
Labour Co-op	Barbara Cannon	27,687	26.13	
Liberal Democrats	Loraine Birchall	21,506	20.39	
Turnout		105,946		
Total votes		107,824	27.62%	
Conservative hold				

Legend
- 50-55% McCall
- 50-55% McCall
- 60-65% McCall
- 40-45% Birchall

=== Derbyshire Constabulary ===
2021 Derbyshire police and crime commissioner election
Party	Candidate	1st round		2nd round			1st round votesTransfer votes, 2nd round
Party	Candidate	Total	Of round	Transfers	Total	Of round	1st round votesTransfer votes, 2nd round
Conservative	Angelique Foster	137,884	49.40%	11,865	149,749	56.02%	
Labour Co-op	Hardyal Dhindsa*	104,700	37.51%	12,864	117,564	43.98%	
Liberal Democrats	Stanley Heptinstall	25,811	9.25%				
Reform	Tim Prosser	10,721	3.84%				
Turnout		279,116					
Conservative gain from Labour							

=== Devon and Cornwall Police ===
2021 Devon and Cornwall police and crime commissioner election
Party	Candidate	1st round		2nd round			1st round votesTransfer votes, 2nd round
Party	Candidate	Total	Of round	Transfers	Total	Of round	1st round votesTransfer votes, 2nd round
Conservative	Alison Hernandez*	247,173	49.97%	28,044	275,217	65.19%	
Labour	Gareth Derrick	99,894	20.20%	47,085	146,979	34.81%	
Liberal Democrats	Brian Blake	88,318	17.86%				
Green	Stuart Paul Jackson	59,242	11.98%				
Turnout		494,627					
Conservative hold							

=== Dorset Police ===
2021 Dorset police and crime commissioner election
Party	Candidate	1st round		2nd round			1st round votesTransfer votes, 2nd round
Party	Candidate	Total	Of round	Transfers	Total	Of round	1st round votesTransfer votes, 2nd round
Conservative	David Sidwick	64,071	42.5%	6,282	70,353	61.83%	
Independent	Dan Hardy	31,112	20.6%	12,315	43,427	38.17%	
Green	Claire Seymour	21,283	14.1%				
Liberal Democrats	Mark Robson	17,837	11.8%				
Labour Co-op	Patrick Canavan	16,379	10.9%				
Turnout		152,956	25.52%				
Total votes		152,956					
Conservative gain from Independent							

An independent candidate, Dan Hardy, originally withdrew from the election after the postponement of the 2020 election meant he was unable to financially continue his campaign. However, in March 2021 he announced he was standing again for election.

=== Durham Constabulary ===
2021 Durham police and crime commissioner election
Party	Candidate	1st round		2nd round			1st round votesTransfer votes, 2nd round
Party	Candidate	Total	Of round	Transfers	Total	Of round	1st round votesTransfer votes, 2nd round
Labour Co-op	Joy Allen	71,084	43.82%	9,426	80,510	51.00%	
Conservative	George Jabbour	69,748	43.00%	7,604	77,352	49.00%	
Liberal Democrats	Anne Marie Curry	21,376	13.18%				
Turnout		162,208					
Labour hold							

=== Essex Police ===
2021 Essex police, fire and crime commissioner election
Party	Candidate	Votes	%	±%
Conservative	Roger Hirst*	235,246	54.0	−2.7
Labour Co-op	Chris Vince	99,712	22.9	+3.2
Liberal Democrats	Jon Whitehouse	58,131	13.3	+4.0
English Democrat	Robin Tilbrook	42,831	9.8	N/A
Turnout		435,920		
Conservative hold				

=== Gloucestershire Constabulary ===
2021 Gloucestershire police and crime commissioner election
Party	Candidate	1st round		2nd round			1st round votesTransfer votes, 2nd round
Party	Candidate	Total	Of round	Transfers	Total	Of round	1st round votesTransfer votes, 2nd round
Conservative	Chris Nelson	79,086	40.6%	12,011	91,097	60.36%	
Liberal Democrats	Chris Coleman	37,024	19.0%	22,814	59,838	39.64%	
Independent	Martin Surl*	34,286	17.6%				
Labour	Simon O'Rourke	31,347	16.1%				
Independent	Adrian Stratton	13,131	6.7%				
Turnout		194,874	40.9				
Conservative gain from Independent							

=== Greater Manchester Police ===
Greater Manchester Mayoral Election 2021
Party	Candidate	1st round		2nd round			1st round votesTransfer votes, 2nd round
Party	Candidate	Total	Of round	Transfers	Total	Of round	1st round votesTransfer votes, 2nd round
Labour Co-op	Andy Burnham	473,024	67.31%				
Conservative	Laura Evans	137,753	19.60%				
Green	Melanie Horrocks	30,699	4.37%				
Liberal Democrats	Simon Lepori	22,373	3.18%				
Reform	Nick Buckley	18,910	2.69%				
English Democrat	Stephen Morris	9,488	1.35%				
Independent	Marcus Farmer	6,448	0.92%				
Independent	David Sutcliffe	2,182	0.31%				
Independent	Alec Marvel	1,907	0.27%				
Majority					335,271	50.4%	
Turnout		714,745	34.74%	Rejected ballots: 11,743			
Registered electors		2,057,643					

=== Hampshire Constabulary ===
2021 Hampshire police and crime commissioner election
Party	Candidate	1st round		2nd round			1st round votesTransfer votes, 2nd round
Party	Candidate	Total	Of round	Transfers	Total	Of round	1st round votesTransfer votes, 2nd round
Conservative	Donna Jones	262,667	49.84%	50,326	312,993	68.23%	
Labour Co-op	Tony Bunday	101,832	19.32%	43,919	145,751	31.77%	
Liberal Democrats	Richard Murphy	93,581	17.76%				
Hampshire Independents	Steve James-Bailey	68,895	13.07%				
Turnout		526,975	36.19%				
Conservative hold							

=== Hertfordshire Constabulary ===
2021 Hertfordshire police and crime commissioner election
Party	Candidate	1st round		2nd round			1st round votesTransfer votes, 2nd round
Party	Candidate	Total	Of round	Transfers	Total	Of round	1st round votesTransfer votes, 2nd round
Conservative	David Lloyd*	155,144	48.54%	12,761	167,905	55.30%	
Liberal Democrats	Sam North	87,524	27.38%	48,172	135,696	44.70%	
Labour Co-op	Philip Ross	76,941	24.07%				
Turnout		319,609					
Conservative hold							

=== Humberside Police ===
2021 Humberside police and crime commissioner election
Party	Candidate	1st round		2nd round			1st round votesTransfer votes, 2nd round
Party	Candidate	Total	Of round	Transfers	Total	Of round	1st round votesTransfer votes, 2nd round
Conservative	Jonathan Evison	71,554	45.56%	7,980	79,534	52.62%	
Labour Co-op	Keith Hunter*	61,859	39.39%	9,756	71,615	47.38%	
Liberal Democrats	Bob Morgan	23,640	15.05%				
Turnout		157,053					
Total votes		157,053					
Conservative gain from Labour Co-op							

=== Kent Police ===
2021 Kent police and crime commissioner election
Party	Candidate	Votes	%	±%
Conservative	Matthew Scott*	237,278	57.80	+24.7
Labour Co-op	Lola Oyewusi	103,807	25.28	+6.18
Liberal Democrats	Graham Colley	69,464	16.92	+9.52
Turnout		410,549		
Conservative hold				

Legend
- 45-50% Scott
- 50-55% Scott
- 55-60% Scott
  60-65% Scott

=== Lancashire Constabulary ===
2021 Lancashire police and crime commissioner election
Party	Candidate	1st round		2nd round			1st round votesTransfer votes, 2nd round
Party	Candidate	Total	Of round	Transfers	Total	Of round	1st round votesTransfer votes, 2nd round
Conservative	Andrew Snowden	166,202	44.78%	15,152	181,354	51.27%	
Labour Co-op	Clive Grunshaw*	154,195	41.55%	18,167	172,362	48.73%	
Liberal Democrats	Neil Darby	32,813	8.84%				
Reform	Mark James Barker	17,926	4.83%				
Turnout		371,136	33.7%				
Total votes		371,136					
Conservative gain from Labour							

=== Leicestershire Police ===
2021 Leicestershire police and crime commissioner election
Party	Candidate	1st round		2nd round			1st round votesTransfer votes, 2nd round
Party	Candidate	Total	Of round	Transfers	Total	Of round	1st round votesTransfer votes, 2nd round
Conservative	Rupert Matthews	121,252	49.27%	14,314	135,566	57.01%	
Labour Co-op	Ross Willmott	81,898	33.28%	20,313	102,211	42.99%	
Liberal Democrats	James Moore	42,951	17.45%				
Turnout		253,487	31.11%				
Total votes		253,487					
Conservative gain from Labour							

=== Lincolnshire Police ===
2021 Lincolnshire police and crime commissioner election
Party	Candidate	Votes	%	±%
Conservative	Marc Jones*	102,813	59.9	+24.7
Labour Co-op	Rosanne Kirk	34,310	20.0	−2.8
Lincolnshire Independent	David William	18,375	10.7	−5.8
Liberal Democrats	Ross Pepper	10,172	5.9	+5.9
Reform	Peter Escreet	6,101	3.6	+3.6
Turnout		171,771		
Conservative hold				

Legend
- 40-45% Jones
- 55-60% Jones
- 60-65% Jones

=== Metropolitan Police ===
Mayor of London election 6 May 2021
Party	Candidate	1st round		2nd round			1st round votesTransfer votes, 2nd round
Party	Candidate	Total	Of round	Transfers	Total	Of round	1st round votesTransfer votes, 2nd round
Labour	Sadiq Khan	1,013,721	40.0%	192,313	1,206,034	55.2%	
Conservative	Shaun Bailey	893,051	35.3%	84,550	977,601	44.8%	
Green	Siân Berry	197,976	7.8%				
Liberal Democrats	Luisa Porritt	111,716	4.4%				
Independent	Niko Omilana	49,628	2.0%				
Reclaim	Laurence Fox	47,634	1.9%				
London Real	Brian Rose	31,111	1.2%				
Rejoin EU	Richard Hewison	28,012	1.1%				
Count Binface	Count Binface	24,775	1.0%				
Women's Equality	Mandu Reid	21,182	0.8%				
Let London Live	Piers Corbyn	20,604	0.8%				
Animal Welfare	Vanessa Hudson	16,826	0.7%				
UKIP	Peter Gammons	14,393	0.6%				
Independent	Farah London	11,869	0.5%				
Heritage	David Kurten	11,025	0.4%				
Independent	Nims Obunge	9,682	0.4%				
SDP	Steve Kelleher	8,764	0.3%				
Renew	Kam Balayev	7,774	0.3%				
Independent	Max Fosh	6,309	0.2%				
Burning Pink	Valerie Brown	5,305	0.2%				
Labour hold							

=== Merseyside Police ===
2021 Merseyside police and crime commissioner election
Party	Candidate	Votes	%	±%
Labour Co-op	Emily Spurrell	178,875	56.9	−4.9
Conservative	Bob Teesdale	71,961	22.9	+5.0
Liberal Democrats	Kris Brown	51,979	16.5	+5.1
Reform	Malcolm Webster	11,662	3.7	N/A
Turnout		314,477		
Labour hold				

=== Norfolk Constabulary ===
2021 Norfolk police and crime commissioner election
Party	Candidate	1st round		2nd round			1st round votesTransfer votes, 2nd round
Party	Candidate	Total	Of round	Transfers	Total	Of round	1st round votesTransfer votes, 2nd round
Conservative	Giles Orpen-Smellie	103,980	45.08%	16,014	119,994	63.31%	
Labour Co-op	Michael Rosen	51,056	22.14%	18,496	69,552	36.69%	
Liberal Democrats	John Crofts	31,666	13.73%				
Green	Martin Schmierer	23,469	10.18%				
Independent	David Moreland	20,473	8.88%				
Turnout		230,644					
Conservative hold							

=== Northamptonshire Police ===
2021 Northamptonshire police, fire, and crime commissioner election
Party	Candidate	Votes	%	±%
Conservative	Stephen Mold*	102,752	53.17%	+12.67%
Labour Co-op	Clare Pavitt	53,166	27.51%	−7.99%
Liberal Democrats	Ana Savage Gunn	29,621	15.33%	+15.33%
Reform	Mark Hearn	7,715	3.99%	+3.99%
Turnout		193,254	34.8%	
Conservative hold				

Legend
- 50-55% Mold

=== Northumbria Police ===
2021 Northumbria police and crime commissioner election
Party	Candidate	1st round		2nd round			1st round votesTransfer votes, 2nd round
Party	Candidate	Total	Of round	Transfers	Total	Of round	1st round votesTransfer votes, 2nd round
Labour Co-op	Kim McGuinness*	179,021	46.61%	27,446	206,467	59.61%	
Conservative	Duncan Crute	118,543	30.86%	21,332	139,875	41.39%	
Independent	Julian Kilburn	45,567	11.86%				
Liberal Democrats	Peter Maughan	40,955	10.66%				
Turnout		384,086	37%				
Labour hold							

=== North Yorkshire Police ===
2021 North Yorkshire police, fire and crime commissioner election
Party	Candidate	1st round		2nd round			1st round votesTransfer votes, 2nd round
Party	Candidate	Total	Of round	Transfers	Total	Of round	1st round votesTransfer votes, 2nd round
Conservative	Philip Allott	73,656	47.0%	10,081	83,737	61.0%	
Labour Co-op	Alison Hume	40,803	26.1%	12,639	53,442	39.0%	
Independent	Keith Tordoff	22,338	14.3%				
Liberal Democrats	James Barker	19,773	12.6%				
Turnout		156,570	25.47%				
Total votes		156,570					
Conservative hold							

=== Nottinghamshire Police ===
Nottinghamshire Police and Crime Commissioner election, 2021
Party	Candidate	1st round		2nd round			1st round votesTransfer votes, 2nd round
Party	Candidate	Total	Of round	Transfers	Total	Of round	1st round votesTransfer votes, 2nd round
Conservative	Caroline Henry	131,318	47.9%	7,340	138,658	51.36%	
Labour Co-op	Paddy Tipping*	119,271	43.5%	12,031	131,302	48.64%	
Liberal Democrats	David Watts	23,794	8.7%				
Turnout		274,383	34%				
Conservative gain from Labour							

=== South Yorkshire Police ===
2021 South Yorkshire police and crime commissioner election
Party	Candidate	Votes	%	±%
Labour Co-op	Alan Billings*	165,442	53.9	+2.0
Conservative	David Chinchen	98,851	32.2	+21.5
Liberal Democrats	Joe Otten	42,462	13.8	+3.7
Turnout		306,755	30.9	
Labour hold				

Legend
- 45-50% Billings
- 50-55% Billings
- 55-60% Billings

=== Staffordshire Police ===
2021 Staffordshire police, fire and crime commissioner election
Party	Candidate	Votes	%	±%
Conservative	Ben Adams	136,024	55.71	
Labour Co-op	Tony Kearon	67,050	27.46	
Independent	Deneice Florence-Jukes	19,102	7.82	
Liberal Democrats	Richard Whelan	10,690	4.38	
Reform	Michael Riley	5,504	2.25	
Turnout		238,370		
Conservative hold				

=== Suffolk Constabulary ===
2021 Suffolk police and crime commissioner election
Party	Candidate	Votes	%	±%
Conservative	Tim Passmore*	112,139	54.7	
Labour Co-op	Elizabeth Hughes	47,159	23.0	
Green	Andy Patmore	27,965	13.6	
Liberal Democrats	James Sandbach	17,801	8.7	
Turnout		204,794		
Conservative hold				

=== Surrey Police ===
2021 Surrey police and crime commissioner election
Party	Candidate	1st round		2nd round			1st round votesTransfer votes, 2nd round
Party	Candidate	Total	Of round	Transfers	Total	Of round	1st round votesTransfer votes, 2nd round
Conservative	Lisa Townsend	112,260	33.5%	42,856	155,116	58.02%	
Liberal Democrats	Paul Kennedy	69,412	20.7%	42,803	112,215	41.98%	
Zero Tolerance Policing, ex Chief	Kevin Hurley	59,554	17.8%				
Labour Co-op	Howard Kaye	53,103	15.9%				
Independent	David Munro*	40,597	12.1%				
Turnout		334,926	38.8%				
Conservative hold							

=== Sussex Police ===
2021 Sussex police and crime commissioner election
Party	Candidate	1st round		2nd round			1st round votesTransfer votes, 2nd round
Party	Candidate	Total	Of round	Transfers	Total	Of round	1st round votesTransfer votes, 2nd round
Conservative	Katy Bourne*	214,523	47.28%	30,287	244,810	65.62%	
Labour Co-op	Paul Richards	84,736	18.68%	43,523	128,259	34.38%	
Liberal Democrats	Jamie Bennett	63,271	13.94%				
Green	Kahina Bouhassane	60,781	13.40%				
Independent	Roy Williams	30,408	6.70%				
Turnout		453,719	35.77%				
Conservative hold							

=== Thames Valley Police ===
2021 Thames Valley police and crime commissioner election
Party	Candidate	1st round		2nd round			1st round votesTransfer votes, 2nd round
Party	Candidate	Total	Of round	Transfers	Total	Of round	1st round votesTransfer votes, 2nd round
Conservative	Matthew Barber	267,404	42.46%	45,744	313,148	57.29%	
Labour Co-op	Laetisia Carter	175,123	27.81%	58,323	233,446	42.71%	
Liberal Democrats	John Howson	110,072	17.48%				
Independent	Alan Robinson	77,210	12.26%				
Turnout		629,809					
Conservative hold							

=== Warwickshire Police ===
2021 Warwickshire police and crime commissioner election
Party	Candidate	Votes	%	±%
Conservative	Philip Seccombe	85,963	52.1	+20.9
Labour Co-op	Ben Twomey	45,768	27.7	+2.2
Liberal Democrats	Louis Adam	26,660	16.2	+5.6
Reform	Henry Lu	6,692	4.1	N/A
Turnout		165,083		
Conservative hold				

Legend
- 40-45% Seccombe
- 50-55% Seccombe
- 55-60% Seccombe
- 60-65% Seccombe

=== West Mercia Police ===
2021 West Mercia police and crime commissioner election
Party	Candidate	Votes	%	±%
Conservative	John-Paul Campion*	179,411	55.34	
Labour	Kuldip Sahota	77,664	23.96	
Liberal Democrats	Margaret Rowley	50,699	15.64	
Reform	Peter Jewell	16,419	5.06	New
Turnout		324,193		
Conservative hold				

=== West Midlands Police ===
2021 West Midlands police and crime commissioner election
Party	Candidate	1st round		2nd round			1st round votesTransfer votes, 2nd round
Party	Candidate	Total	Of round	Transfers	Total	Of round	1st round votesTransfer votes, 2nd round
Labour	Simon Foster	276,743	45.51%	24,663	301,406	53.70%	
Conservative	Jay Singh-Sohal	239,288	39.35%	20,551	259,839	46.30%	
Liberal Democrats	Jon Hunt	38,594	6.35%				
Independent	Julie Hambleton	27,664	4.55%				
Reform	Mark Hoath	18,002	2.96%				
We Matter	Desmond Jaddoo	7,745	1.27%				
Turnout		608,036					
Total votes		625,010	31.02%				
Labour hold							

=== West Yorkshire Police ===
West Yorkshire Mayoral Election 2021
Party	Candidate	1st round		2nd round			1st round votesTransfer votes, 2nd round
Party	Candidate	Total	Of round	Transfers	Total	Of round	1st round votesTransfer votes, 2nd round
Labour Co-op	Tracy Brabin	261,170	43.09%	49,753	310,923	59.81%	
Conservative	Matt Robinson	176,167	29.06%	32,970	209,137	40.21%	
Yorkshire	Bob Buxton	58,851	9.71%				
Green	Andrew Cooper	55,833	9.21%				
Liberal Democrats	Stewart Golton	30,162	4.98%				
Reform	Waj Ali	14,943	2.47%				
English Democrat	Thérèse Hirst	8,969	1.48%				
Majority					101,966	19.62%	
Turnout		606,135	36.52%				
Total votes		617,782					
Registered electors		1,691,429					

=== Wiltshire Police ===
2021 Wiltshire police and crime commissioner election
Party	Candidate	1st round		2nd round			1st round votesTransfer votes, 2nd round
Party	Candidate	Total	Of round	Transfers	Total	Of round	1st round votesTransfer votes, 2nd round
Conservative	Jonathon Seed	84,885	41.06%	15,118	100,003	63.26%	
Liberal Democrats	Liz Webster	35,013	16.94%	23,061	58,074	36.74%	
Labour Co-op	Junab Ali	34,147	16.52%				
Independent	Mike Rees	31,722	15.35%				
Green	Brig Oubridge	16,606	8.03%				
Reform	Julian Malins	4,348	2.10%				
Turnout		206,721					

The Conservative candidate, Jonathon Seed, withdrew on 9 May in the interval between the vote and the count, due to a conviction in 1993 for a 1992 drink driving offence. ITV News had been investigating Seed's background prior to the election after they were told there was something in his past that would prevent him from taking up the position of police and crime commissioner if he was elected; Seed and his campaign team declined to comment. Seed said he had declared the driving conviction to the Conservative party in his applications for his candidature, saying: "To the best of my knowledge and belief when I applied for, and became the Police and Crime Commissioner candidate for the Conservative Party in Wiltshire and Swindon, I was an eligible candidate. I have declared my thirty-year-old driving conviction to the Party in my applications both to be a Parliamentary candidate and more recently a PCC candidate".

Candidates are required to sign a declaration which reads "I am aware of the provisions of the Police Reform and Social Responsibility Act 2011 and to the best of my knowledge and belief I am not disqualified from election as Police and Crime Commissioner." Guidance published by the Electoral Commission says PCC candidates cannot seek election if they have been convicted of an offence punishable with a prison sentence, this includes spent convictions and those where a prison sentence was not given.

Counting of votes went ahead, and Seed won most votes on the second round. Wiltshire Police asked Thames Valley Police to investigate the candidacy, "to ensure independent oversight and to remove any potential conflict of interest". Further investigation by ITV News found a second imprisonable offence arising from the 1992 incident: failure to stop after causing damage to a motor vehicle. Seed was subsequently charged with making a false declaration in the nomination papers, a charge he denied at Oxford Crown Court in November. He was due to stand trial in July 2022, but in June the Crown Prosecution Service dropped the charges after a pre-trial review on the grounds of insufficient evidence.

The post fell vacant when Seed did not deliver acceptance of the office, and a by-election to fill the vacancy was held on 19 August 2021. Legislation states that the office becomes vacant two months after a person elected to the office fails to deliver their acceptance, and requires an election to be held within the subsequent 35 days.

The re-run was won by Conservative candidate Philip Wilkinson.

==== August 2021 re-run ====
August 19 2021 Wiltshire police and crime commissioner election
Party	Candidate	1st round		2nd round			1st round votesTransfer votes, 2nd round
Party	Candidate	Total	Of round	Transfers	Total	Of round	1st round votesTransfer votes, 2nd round
Conservative	Philip Wilkinson	32,564	35.96%	5,188	37,752	52.02%	
Independent	Mike Rees	25,197	27.82%	9,618	34,815	47.98%	
Liberal Democrats	Brian Mathew	17,966	19.84%				
Labour Co-op	Junab Ali	12,971	14.32%				
Reform	Julian Malins	1,859	2.05%				
Turnout		90,557	16.63%				

== Wales ==
Incumbent police and crime commissioners are marked with an asterisk (*).

=== Dyfed-Powys Police ===
2021 Dyfed-Powys Police and Crime Commissioner election
Party	Candidate	1st round		2nd round			1st round votesTransfer votes, 2nd round
Party	Candidate	Total	Of round	Transfers	Total	Of round	1st round votesTransfer votes, 2nd round
Plaid Cymru	Dafydd Llywelyn	68,208	33.60%	26,280	94,488	54.97%	
Conservative	Jon Burns	69,112	34.04%	8,296	77,408	45.03%	
Labour Co-op	Philippa Thompson	48,033	23.66%				
Liberal Democrats	Glyn Preston	17,649	8.69%				
Turnout		210,795					
Rejected ballots		7,793					
Registered electors							
Plaid Cymru hold							

=== Gwent Police ===
2021 Gwent police and crime commissioner election
Party	Candidate	1st round		2nd round			1st round votesTransfer votes, 2nd round
Party	Candidate	Total	Of round	Transfers	Total	Of round	1st round votesTransfer votes, 2nd round
Labour Co-op	Jeff Cuthbert*	75,775	41.79%	16,841	92,616	60.47%	
Conservative	Hannah Jarvis	52,313	28.85%	8,223	60,536	39.53%	
Plaid Cymru	Donna Cushing	29,392	16.21%				
Independent	Paul Harley	13,601	7.50%				
Liberal Democrats	John Miller	7,640	4.21%				
Gwlad	Clayton Jones	2,615	1.44%				
Turnout		181,336					
Total votes		181,336					
Labour Co-op hold							

=== North Wales Police ===
2021 North Wales police and crime commissioner election
Party	Candidate	1st round		2nd round			1st round votesTransfer votes, 2nd round
Party	Candidate	Total	Of round	Transfers	Total	Of round	1st round votesTransfer votes, 2nd round
Labour Co-op	Andy Dunbobbin	69,459	29.10%	28,575	98,034	52.10%	
Conservative	Pat Astbury	75,472	31.62%	14,677	90,149	47.90%	
Plaid Cymru	Ann Griffith	67,672	28.36%				
Independent	Mark Young	15,907	6.67%				
Liberal Democrats	Lisa Wilkins	10,149	4.25%				
Turnout		238,659	46.08%				
Total votes		238,659					
Labour Co-op gain from Plaid Cymru							

=== South Wales Police ===
2021 South Wales police and crime commissioner election
Party	Candidate	1st round		2nd round			1st round votesTransfer votes, 2nd round
Party	Candidate	Total	Of round	Transfers	Total	Of round	1st round votesTransfer votes, 2nd round
Labour Co-op	Alun Michael*	177,110	40.99%	48,353	225,463	63.82%	
Conservative	Steve Gallagher	102,465	23.71%	25,379	127,844	36.18%	
Plaid Cymru	Nadine Marshall	82,246	19.03%				
Independent	Michael Baker	37,110	8.59%				
Liberal Democrats	Callum Littlemore	19,907	4.61%				
Propel	Gail John	13,263	3.07%				
Turnout		432,101					
Total votes		432,101					
Labour Co-op hold							
