= List of female police and crime commissioners =

This is a list of women who are or have been police and crime commissioners in England and Wales.

== List of female police and crime commissioners ==
| Party | Name | Constituency | Start | End | Reason |
|---|---|---|---|---|---|
| Labour | Vera Baird (Note: Also served as a Member of Parliament (MP).) | Northumbria | 2012 | 2019 | Resigned |
| Independent | Ann Barnes | Kent | 2012 | 2016 | Retired |
| Conservative | Katy Bourne | Sussex | 2012 | present | Serving |
| Labour | Jane Kennedy | Merseyside | 2012 | 2019 | Resigned from Labour |
| Independent | Jane Kennedy | Merseyside | 2019 | 2021 | Retired |
| Independent | Sue Mountstevens | Avon and Somerset | 2012 | 2021 | Retired |
| Conservative | Julia Mulligan | North Yorkshire | 2012 | 2021 | Retired |
| Conservative | Alison Hernandez | Devon and Cornwall | 2016 | present | Serving |
| Conservative | Kathryn Holloway | Bedfordshire | 2016 | 2021 | Retired |
| Labour | Kim McGuinness (Note: Also served as a directly-elected strategic authority mayor.) | Northumbria | 2019 | 2024 | Retired, elected mayor of the North East |
| Labour Co-op | Joy Allen | Durham | 2021 | present | Serving |
| Conservative | Angelique Foster | Derbyshire | 2021 | 2024 | Defeated |
| Conservative | Caroline Henry | Nottinghamshire | 2021 | 2024 | Defeated |
| Conservative | Donna Jones | Hampshire | 2021 | present | Serving |
| Conservative | Zoë Metcalfe | North Yorkshire | 2021 | 2024 | Position abolished |
| Labour Co-op | Emily Spurrell | Merseyside | 2021 | present | Serving |
| Conservative | Lisa Townsend | Surrey | 2021 | present | Serving |
| Labour Co-op | Susan Dungworth | Northumbria | 2024 | present | Serving |
| Labour Co-op | Clare Moody (Note: Also served as a Member of the European Parliament (MEP).) | Avon and Somerset | 2024 | present | Serving |
| Labour Co-op | Jane Mudd | Gwent | 2024 | present | Serving |
| Labour Co-op | Nicolle Ndiweni | Derbyshire | 2024 | present | Serving |
| Labour Co-op | Danielle Stone | Northamptonshire | 2024 | present | Serving |
| Labour Co-op | Sarah Taylor | Norfolk | 2024 | 2025 | Resigned from Labour |
| Independent | Sarah Taylor | Norfolk | 2025 | present | Serving |
| Labour Co-op | Emma Wools | South Wales | 2024 | present | Serving |
