= Julian Malins =

British barrister and politician (born 1950)

Julian Malins KC
- Born: Julian Henry Malins; 1 May 1950; Rinteln, West Germany
- Education: Brasenose College, Oxford, Oxford University
- Occupation: Barrister
- Political party: Reform UK
- Other political affiliations: Conservatives (until 2019)
- Spouse: Divorced
- Children: 3
- Relatives: Humfrey Malins MP

Julian Malins, KC (1 May 1950) is a British barrister and a Reform UK candidate who served as the Farringdon ward councillor of the City of London and a Governor of the Museum of London.

== Early life ==
Malins was born in Rinteln, West Germany, where his father served as an army vicar. Brought up in Ghana, Nigeria and Singapore, he was educated at Brasenose College, Oxford. He studied at The College of Law, and was called to the Bar of England and Wales in 1972 by the Middle Temple and subsequently to the Bars of the Cayman Islands and British Virgin Islands and on a case-by-case basis to other Bars. He was pupil to Baron Alexander of Weedon QC.

== Legal career ==
Malins served as a deputy judge and a recorder from 1990. The retirement age for such posts is 70 years.

Malins was retained by Cambridge Analytica to report on its political activities.

== Political career ==
As well as being elected a councillor in the City of London, Malins also contested the Pontefract and Castleford constituency for the Conservatives at the 1987 General Election, where he lost to Labour's Geoffrey Lofthouse, coming second of four candidates with 21.2% of the vote.

Malins left the Conservative Party and put himself up as a candidate for The Brexit Party for the Salisbury constituency in the 2019 UK general election. He ultimately did not stand, after the party withdrew from competing in 317 Conservative-held seats to avoid splitting the vote.

He stood for Reform UK as a candidate for Wiltshire Police and Crime Commissioner in 2021, and came last in 6th place, finishing the election with 4,348 votes. Malins also stood in the subsequent by-election, when original winner Jonathon Seed was disqualified, but again finished last, with 1,859 first-preference votes (2.1%).

Malins stood again in Salisbury at the 2024 general election, as the Reform UK candidate; he finished in fourth place of seven candidates with 10.4% of the vote, with Conservative MP John Glen holding his seat.

== Personal life ==
His brother Humfrey Malins is Conservative Party politician.

== See also ==
- Dominic Grieve
- Edward Bysshe
- John Brightman, Baron Brightman

Government offices	Councillors for the City of London; 1981–present
