= Ghosts (2006 film) =

- DVD cover
- Directed by: Nick Broomfield
- Written by: Nick Broomfield; Jez Lewis
- Produced by: Nick Broomfield; Jez Lewis
- Starring: Ai Qin Lin; Zhe Wei
- Cinematography: Mark Wolf
- Edited by: Peter Christelis
- Music by: Harry Escott; Molly Nyman
- Distributed by: Beyond Films
- Release dates: 21 September 2006 (San Sebastián Film Festival); 12 January 2007 (United Kingdom)
- Running time: 96 minutes
- Country: United Kingdom
- Languages: Mandarin, Fuzhou dialect, English

Ghosts is a 2006 drama film directed by Nick Broomfield, based on the 2004 Morecambe Bay cockling disaster. The title is a reference to the Cantonese slang term Gweilo (鬼佬), meaning "ghost man", used for white people.

== Plot ==
Ai Qin is an illegal Chinese immigrant to the United Kingdom. She comes from Fuzhou, China, where there the only work is badly paid agricultural labour, and even this is in short supply. Ai Qin has a son but her husband is not seen (it is later revealed that he left her for another woman). The family have some awareness of the dangers of leaving for a foreign country, and can keep in touch using mobile phones, but they have no control once Ai Qin puts herself in the hands of a "snakehead" gang who, for a deposit of $5,000 (and the obligation to pay off the loan of a further $20,000), will smuggle her to Europe.

The film follows her from China to the United Kingdom where she gets a job in a meat-packing factory. It asserts that the UK's food industry is heavily dependent on underpaid, exploited migrant labour. "Massage" (i.e. sex work) is offered as a better paid alternative, but she resists this. She finds herself dependent on a "gangmaster", who, however, is only one step up himself and needs to bribe richer contractors to get her and others even badly paid work. His position and that of the group is deteriorating, and it is in some desperation that they turn to cockle-picking at Morecambe Bay.

The film begins and ends with scenes recreating the 2004 Morecambe Bay cockling disaster, in which 23 illegal workers lost their lives whilst cockle-picking.

== Cast ==
- Ai Qin Lin as Ai Qin
- Zhan Yu as Mr. Lin
- Zhe Wei as Xiao Li
- Man Qin Wei as Chiao
- Yong Aing Zhai
- Devi Zhu
- Shaun Gallagher as Robert

== Basis in fact ==
The 2004 Morecambe Bay cockling disaster involved 38 individuals, of whom 23 drowned. The gangmaster got 14 years' imprisonment. His girlfriend was found guilty of immigration offences. The film shows a much smaller group, so it is not a literal retelling.

== Release ==
It was released in January 2007. It was aired on the British TV channel More4 in 2007.
