= 2021 North Yorkshire Police, Fire and Crime Commissioner by-election =

2021 police, crime and fire commissioner by-election

← 2021	25 November 2021	2024 →

	First party	Second party
Candidate	Zoë Metcalfe	Emma Scott-Spivey
Party	Conservative	Labour
1st round	34,385	18,094
Share	39.5%	20.8%
Change	▼7.3%	▼5.1%
2nd round	41,760	26,895
Share	60.8%	39.2%
Change	▼0.2%	▲0.2%
	Third party	Fourth party
Candidate	Keith Tordoff	James Barker
Party	Independent	Liberal Democrats
1st round	14,988	9,499
Share	17.2%	10.9%
Change	▲2.4%	▼1.7%
	Fifth party
Candidate	Hannah Barnham-Brown
Party	Women's Equality
1st round	8,837
Share	10.2%
Change	New party
PFCC before election
Philip Allott
Conservative
Elected PFCC
Zoë Metcalfe
Conservative

A by-election was held on 25 November 2021 for the North Yorkshire Police, Fire and Crime Commissioner post after the resignation of Philip Allott following his remarks on the murder of Sarah Everard. The election was won by the Conservative Party candidate Zoë Metcalfe.

Nominations opened on 21 October. The candidates contesting the election were Zoë Metcalfe (Conservative), Emma Scott-Spivey (Labour), James Barker (Liberal Democrats), Keith Tordoff (Independent) and Hannah Barham-Brown (Women's Equality Party).

== Result ==
2021 North Yorkshire police, fire and crime commissioner by-election
Party	Candidate	1st round		2nd round			1st round votesTransfer votes, 2nd round
Party	Candidate	Total	Of round	Transfers	Total	Of round	1st round votesTransfer votes, 2nd round
Conservative	Zoë Metcalfe	34,385	39.5%	7,375	41,760	60.8%	
Labour	Emma Scott-Spivey	18,094	20.8%	8,801	26,895	39.2%	
Independent	Keith Tordoff	14,988	17.2%				
Liberal Democrats	James Barker	9,499	10.9%				
Women's Equality	Hannah Barham-Brown	8,837	10.2%				
Turnout		85,808	13.8%				
Rejected ballots		1,165	0.2%				
Total votes		86,973	13.9%				
Registered electors		623,821					
Conservative hold							

== Previous result ==
2021 North Yorkshire police, fire and crime commissioner election
Party	Candidate	1st round		2nd round			1st round votesTransfer votes, 2nd round
Party	Candidate	Total	Of round	Transfers	Total	Of round	1st round votesTransfer votes, 2nd round
Conservative	Philip Allott	73,657	46.75%	10,080	83,737	61.04%	
Labour	Alison Hume	40,803	25.89%	12,639	53,442	38.96%	
Independent	Keith Tordoff	23,308	14.79%				
Liberal Democrats	James Barker	19,773	12.57%				
Turnout		157,541	25.4%				
Rejected ballots							
Total votes							
Registered electors							
Conservative win							
