= Philip Allott =

Public Commissioner for North Yorkshire, England

North Yorkshire Police, Fire and Crime Commissioner
- In office 13 May 2021 – 16 October 2021
- Preceded by: Julia Mulligan
- Succeeded by: Zoë Metcalfe

Personal details
- Born: December 1959 (age 66)
- Party: Conservative

Philip David Allott (born December 1959) is a British politician who served as the Police, Fire and Crime Commissioner for North Yorkshire, England. He was elected in May 2021, taking over the job from fellow Conservative Julia Mulligan on 13 May. He resigned on 15 October 2021 and left office on the following day.

== Life ==
Allott attended King James's School in Knaresborough. He studied law at Leeds Metropolitan University as a mature student, and is married with a son and a daughter. Allott was a leader of the Conservatives on Harrogate Borough Council. He had previously served in the Territorial Army, and at the age of 25, was elected Mayor of Knaresborough, the youngest mayor in the country at that time. He had unsuccessfully stood in several general elections for the Conservative Party, contesting the Leeds West constituency in 1987, Brent North in 2001, Bolton West in 2005, and Halifax in both 2010 and 2015.

Allott has written a book, The Donkeyman, detailing his father's business in breeding and racing donkeys in the 1950s and 1960s.

== Police, Fire and Crime Commissioner ==
In May 2021, Allott stood as the Conservative Party candidate in the North Yorkshire Police, Fire and Crime Commissioner election and was elected after winning 55.69% of votes in the second round. He assumed the role on 13 May, replacing the previous commissioner, Julia Mulligan. Prior to being elected, he was the managing director of a public relations and marketing agency.

In October 2021, he was criticised for his remarks on the murder of Sarah Everard. She had been abducted, raped, and killed by a police officer who had falsely arrested her in March. Allott had urged women to be "streetwise", to "learn a bit about that legal process". He initially defended his comments as he intended to "inform women far better of their rights" before later apologising. Labour Party leader Keir Starmer, Conservative MP for Skipton and Ripon Julian Smith, and The Northern Echo and The Yorkshire Post newspapers called for his resignation. The North Yorkshire Police, Fire and Crime Panel, which lacks the ability to remove the commissioner, passed a unanimous vote of no confidence in him on 14 October, calling on him to "resign immediately". Allott initially refused, responding that he thought he would be able to "regain trust", but later the same day tendered his resignation from his post.

His successor was elected at the 2021 North Yorkshire Police, Fire and Crime Commissioner by-election.

== Elections contested ==
Year	Constituency	Party	Votes	% votes	Position	Ref.
1987 general election	Leeds West	Conservative	11,276	23.2	3rd of 3	
2001 general election	Brent North	Conservative	9,944	29.3	2nd of 3	
2005 general election	Bolton West	Conservative	15,175	37.4	2nd of 6	
2010 general election	Halifax	Conservative	14,806	34.0	2nd of 6	
2015 general election	Halifax	Conservative	17,078	39.0	2nd of 7	
2021 Police and Crime Commissioner election	North Yorkshire	Conservative	83,737	61.0	Won	

Political offices
Preceded by Julia Mulligan	North Yorkshire Police, Fire and Crime Commissioner; May – October 2021	Succeeded by Zoë Metcalfe
