= Joy Allen (politician) =

British politician (born 1965)

Police and Crime Commissioner for Durham
- Incumbent
- Assumed office 13 May 2021
- Preceded by: Steven White

Member of Durham County Council for Bishop Auckland Town
- In office 4 May 2017 – 6 May 2021

Personal details
- Born: 18 July 1965 (age 61) Spennymoor, County Durham, England
- Party: Labour
- Education: New College Durham (BA); University of Leicester (MSc); Durham University (MBA)
- Website: Official website

Joy Allen (born 18 July 1965) is a British politician serving as Police and Crime Commissioner for Durham since 2021. A member of the Labour Party, she served as a member of Durham County Council from 2017 to 2021.

== Early career ==
Allen has spent most of her career working in the public sector for Durham Constabulary, Sedgefield Borough Council, Middlesbrough Council and County Durham and Darlington Fire and Rescue Service as Head of Service and Area Manager for Community Safety.

== Political career ==
She was elected to Durham County Council in 2013 and appointed to the Cabinet in 2015, where she held the Safer Communities Portfolio. In 2017, she was appointed to lead Durham County Council’s Transformation Programme. She was elected Mayor of Bishop Auckland in 2019 and was a cabinet member for Transformation, Culture and Tourism.

She is a member of the Fabian Society's executive committee.

== Police and Crime Commissioner ==
Allen was elected at the 2021 England and Wales police and crime commissioner elections, being the first person since Ron Hogg to be elected following his death in 2019.

Allen promised new police officers, to tackle crime, protect communities and victims, and pursue criminals in her election manifesto. She ensured that Durham Constabulary was the first police force in the UK to initiate a Workplace Gambling Charter. She further approved the new Durham Constabulary Investigative Hub to be built at Spennymoor. Allen proposed a £10 tax hike for residents in County Durham and Darlington which was approved by the Police and Crime Panel.

Allen was re-elected at the 2024 England and Wales police and crime commissioner elections.
