= Margaret Beels =

British civil servant

Margaret Beels OBE

Director of Labour Market Enforcement
- Incumbent
- Assumed office 22 November 2021
- Preceded by: Matthew Taylor (interim)

Chair of the Gangmasters and Labour Abuse Authority
- In office 2017 – 18 November 2021
- Preceded by: Position established
- Succeeded by: Julia Mulligan

Personal details
- Born: Margaret Beels
- Occupation: Career civil servant

Margaret Beels OBE is a British civil servant who serves as the United Kingdom's Director of Labour Market Enforcement. In this position, she is responsible for overseeing the Employment Agencies Standards Inspectorate (part of the Department for Business and Trade), the Gangmasters and Labour Abuse Authority (GLAA), and HM Revenue and Customs' National Minimum wage enforcement team.

== Career ==
Beels began her career at the Department of Energy, where she worked on the privatisation of the electricity industry in England and Wales during the late 1980s. She later joined British Gas as Head of Compliance and subsequently became Director of Scottish Gas at Centrica.

In July 2011, Beels was appointed Chair of the Gangmasters Licensing Authority (GLA), the predecessor to the GLAA. The GLAA later transferred from the Department for Environment, Food and Rural Affairs (Defra) to the Home Office, and Beels was involved in the organisation's transition and the creation of the Gangmasters and Labour Abuse Authority, which expanded its remit to include tackling forced and compulsory labour across the wider labour market.

On 22 November 2021, the UK Government announced Beels' appointment as the Director of Labour Market Enforcement, responsible for setting the strategic direction for labour market enforcement bodies in England and Wales. Beels' appointment was supported by industry experts in the field of freelancing and self-employment.

== Views ==
Beels expressed support for the proposal in the UK Government's 2019 Conservative Party manifesto to consolidate the three existing labour market enforcement bodies into a single enforcement authority. The planned merger was later discontinued by Grant Shapps when he served as Secretary of State for Business.

In February 2023, Beels raised concerns about limited enforcement resources, stating that the UK employed only a quarter of the number of labour inspectors recommended by the International Labour Organization. She also noted that many vulnerable workers lacked awareness of labour enforcement bodies, saying they "probably don’t have the foggiest who we are".

In February 2023, Beels expressed concern about the limited resources available to her as Director of Labour Market Enforcement, explaining that the UK only had a quarter of the number of labour market inspectors that would be recommended by the International Labour Organization. She also lamented a lack of awareness about UK labour market enforcement bodies among vulnerable workers, saying that those affected "probably don't have the foggiest who we are".

In January 2025, Beels urged the Government to take stronger action on false self-employment, telling a parliamentary committee that "you can probably consult until the cows come home … but it is about time to do something about it". She argued that extended delays in policymaking were undermining efforts to curb labour exploitation.

== Honours ==
Beels was awarded an OBE in the 2020 New Year Honours for services to the labour market, employment rights, and to tackling modern slavery.
