= Winston Roddick =

Winston Roddick CB KC
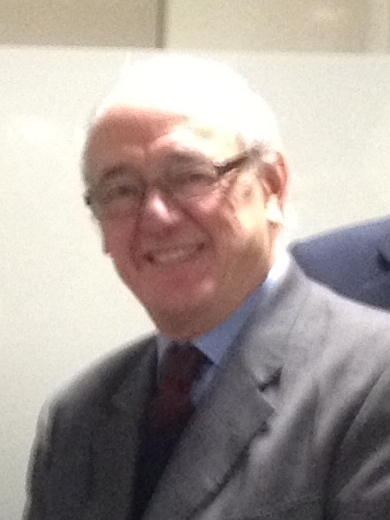
- Roddick in 2013

North Wales Police and Crime Commissioner
- In office 22 November 2012 – 11 May 2016
- Preceded by: Position Established
- Succeeded by: Arfon Jones

Personal details
- Born: George Winston Roddick; 2 October 1940 (age 85) Caernarfon, Wales
- Party: Independent

George Winston Roddick, CB, KC (born 2 October 1940 in Caernarfon) is a Welsh barrister, and the former North Wales Police and Crime Commissioner. At the time he was a member of the Liberal Democrats, but ran as an independent and on election resigned from the Party. Roddick was the first person to hold the post.

== Early life ==
Roddick was born and raised in Caernarfon, educated at the Royal Naval School Tal-Handaq, Malta and the Sir Hugh Owen Grammar School, Caernarfon.

After training and working as a police officer in Liverpool, he undertook a law degree at University College, London.

== Career ==
=== Legal career ===
He then trained as a barrister, appointed to the bar in 1968, and then became a Crown Court recorder. One of Wales's leading barristers, he took silk in 1986, and was appointed as the first Counsel General for Wales in 1998, the most senior legal adviser to the Welsh Assembly, during which time he advised on the creation and legislative passing of the Welsh Language Act 1993.

=== Political career ===
Roddick has twice stood for the Liberal Party unsuccessfully in Parliamentary elections: in Anglesey at the 1970 general election, and in Cardiff South and Penarth in 1983. He also served as Chairman of the Welsh Liberal Party in the early 1980s.

==== Police and Crime Commissioner ====
In November 2012, he sought election as the Police and Crime Commissioner for North Wales Police, beating Labour's Tal Michael on the second count. After his election, he was criticised for running as an independent even though he is a member of the Liberal Democrats, with the Welsh Labour Party accusing him of 'hiding' his allegiance for political reasons. Roddick stood down at the 2016 elections and the seat was won by Arfon Jones of Plaid Cymru.

=== Other ===
In 1997, Roddick was appointed a member of the Independent Television Commission, and between 2004 and 2012 was a member of the S4C Authority.

== Personal life ==
He is a member of the Gorsedd of Bards, patron of Caernarfon Rugby Club, an Honorary Life Member of Caernarfon Town F.C. Supporters Club, the Honorary President of GISDA (Gwynedd charity for homeless young people), and the Vice President of the Caernarfon Male Voice Choir.

== Honours ==
Roddick was awarded the Companion of the Order of the Bath in 2003, and became an Honorary Fellow of the University of Aberystwyth in 1999.
