= Matt Storey =

British labour politician

Matt Storey is a British Labour Party politician who has served as the Cleveland Police and Crime Commissioner since 2024. He defeated Steve Turner of the Conservative Party, the incumbent since 2021.

Storey pledged to give every community a named police officer as part of a plan to bring back community policing, fund domestic abuse support workers, set up a retail crime strategy, get rough sleepers off the streets and into permanent housing alongside providing drug treatment and mental health support, and to always act with integrity in office.

He worked for the Member of Parliament for Middlesbrough, Andy McDonald, from 2012 to 2024 and served as a councillor on Middlesbrough Council representing Central ward between 2016 and 2024.
