= Morecambe Bay cockling disaster =

2004 mass drowning in Morecambe Bay, England

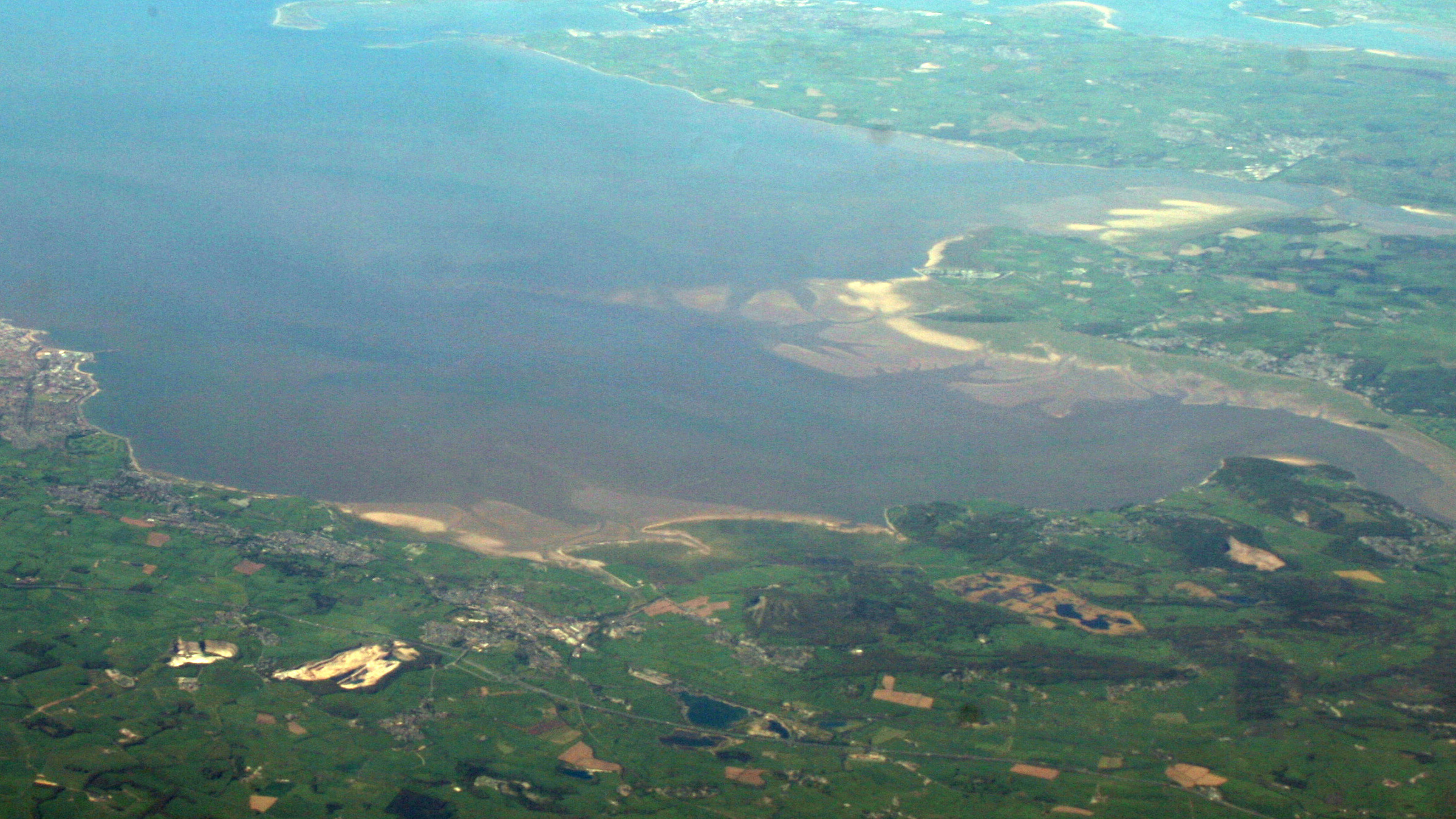
- An aerial image of the bay in 2007
- Date: 5 February 2004
- Location: Morecambe Bay, England; 54°6′25″N 2°49′30″W
- Outcome: 21 bodies recovered, 1 skull found, 1 missing (presumed dead), 15 survivors
- Deaths: 22–23
- Convicted: Lin Liang Ren; Zhao Xiao Qing; Lin Mu Yong

On the evening of 5 February 2004, at least 22 Chinese labourers were drowned by an incoming tide at Morecambe Bay in Lancashire, North West England, while illegally harvesting cockles off the coast. Fifteen other labourers from the same group managed to return safely to shore.

During the investigation and trial, it emerged that the labourers had immigrated illegally, were inexperienced, spoke little or no English and were unfamiliar with the area. The Chinese gangmaster who organised the trip and two associates of his were found guilty of manslaughter, of breaking immigration laws and other crimes, and were sentenced to several years in prison.

The Gangmasters (Licensing) Act 2004 was passed in July of the same year to regulate labour practices in the agricultural and shellfish industries, leading to the establishment of the Gangmasters Licensing Authority.

== Disaster ==
David Anthony Eden Sr. and David Anthony Eden Jr., a father and son from England, had allegedly arranged to pay a group of Chinese workers £5 per 25 kg (20p per kg or 9p per lb) of cockles (five weeks later, the market price of cockles was 60p per kg). The workers had been trafficked via containers into Liverpool, and were hired out through local criminal agents of international Chinese triads. The cockles to be collected are best found at low tide on sand flats at Warton Sands, near Hest Bank. Some 30 cockle pickers set out at 4 pm. The favoured area for cockle picking is close to the low tide line near the confluence of the Keer Channel and the Kent Channel, approximately 3.5 kilometres (2.2 mi) north of Morecambe. The Chinese workers were unfamiliar with local geography, language, and custom. They were cut off by the incoming tide in the bay around 9:30 p.m. The workers were all illegal immigrants, mainly from Fujian, and have been described as having been untrained and inexperienced.

The emergency services were alerted by a mobile phone call made by one of the workers, who spoke little English and was only able to say "sinking water" before the call was cut off. An extensive search and rescue operation was launched. Twenty-one bodies, of people between the ages of 18 and 45, were recovered from the bay. Two of the victims were women; the rest were mostly young men in their 20s and 30s, with two over 40 and one, a male, under 20. Most were previously employed as farmers, and two were fishermen. All the bodies were found between the cockling area and shore, indicating that most had attempted to swim but had been overcome by hypothermia. Four died after the truck they used to reach the cockling area became overwhelmed by water. A further two were believed to have been with those drowned, with remains of one found in 2010.

At the hearing, British cocklers returning to shore on the same evening were reported to have attempted to warn the Chinese group by tapping their watches and trying to speak with them. A survivor testified that the leader of the group had made a mistake about the time of the tides. Fourteen other members of the group are reported to have made it safely to the shore, making 15 survivors in total.

== Prosecutions ==
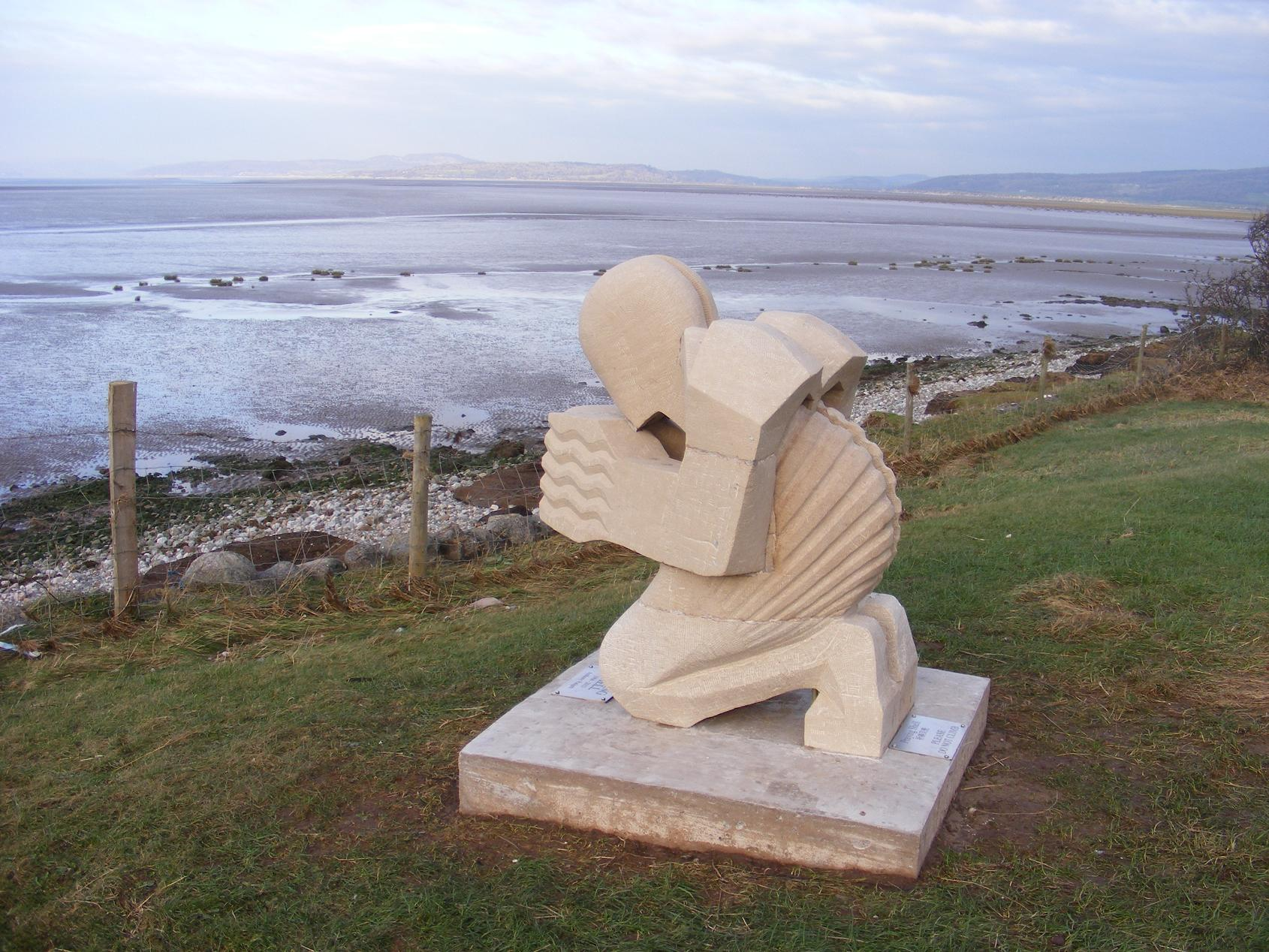
Praying Shell, a 2013 sculpture by Anthony Padgett located near Red Bank Farm, on the edge of Morecambe Bay

David Anthony Eden Sr. and David Anthony Eden Jr., from Prenton, Merseyside, who bought cockles from the work gang, were cleared of helping the workers break immigration law.

Gangmaster Lin Liang Ren, of Lemon Street, Kirkdale, was found guilty of the manslaughter of at least 21 people (at the time of prosecution, the bodies of two further missing cocklers had not been recovered). Lin, his girlfriend Zhao Xiao Qing and his cousin Lin Mu Yong were also convicted of breaking immigration laws. Lin Liang Ren was sentenced to twelve years for manslaughter, six years for facilitating illegal immigration (to be served concurrently with the manslaughter sentence), and two years for conspiracy to pervert the course of justice (to be served subsequent to the manslaughter sentence). Lin Mu Yong was sentenced to four years and nine months. Zhao Xiao Qing was sentenced to two years and nine months for facilitation of illegal immigration and perverting the course of justice.

Lin Liang Ren was deported in 2012 after serving eight years of his twelve-year term; Lin Mo Yong in 2008 after three years; and Zhao Xiao Qing in 2007 after serving one year. It is unknown whether any of the three served sentences once deported back to China.

== Media ==
The 2006 film Ghosts, directed by Nick Broomfield, is a dramatisation of the events leading up to the disaster.

A 2006 documentary, Death in the Bay: The Cocklepickers' Story, was commissioned by Channel 4 as part of its documentary series The Other Side from local filmmaker Loren Slater, who was one of the first people on the scene.

In 2009, Ed Pien's work Memento, commissioned by the Chinese Arts Centre, was developed in response to the plight of illegal immigrants, especially those who died at Morecambe Bay.

In 2010, artist Isaac Julien released his film Ten Thousand Waves about the disaster.

The 2007 folk song "On Morecambe Bay" by folk artist Kevin Littlewood tells the story of the events. This song was later covered by folk musician Christy Moore.

== See also ==
- Gangmasters and Labour Abuse Authority
