= Philip Wilkinson (British Army officer) =

British politician (born 1948)

Police and Crime Commissioner for Wiltshire
- Incumbent
- Assumed office 19 August 2021
- Deputy: Russell Holland
- Preceded by: Angus Macpherson

Personal details
- Party: Conservative

Military service
- Allegiance: United Kingdom
- Branch/service: British Army
- Years of service: 1969–1998
- Rank: Colonel
- Unit: Royal Artillery
- Battles/wars: The Troubles

Colonel Philip Roy Wilkinson OBE (born October 1948) is a retired British Army officer who has served as the Wiltshire Police and Crime Commissioner since August 2021. He was re-elected in May 2024.

Wilkinson was educated at Sandhurst, from where on 25 July 1969 he was commissioned into the Royal Regiment of Artillery. He was a Major in that regiment by 1982 and later served in the Commando and Parachute Brigades and the Special Forces. He retired from the British Army in 1998 and was appointed Officer of the Most Excellent Order of the British Empire (OBE) the same year.

Wilkinson continued to work in security roles, and by 2020 was working in Somalia for the Minister for Internal Security. This was interrupted by the COVID-19 pandemic, and he returned to Wiltshire and began to write a book of memoirs, Sharpening the Weapons of Peace, while becoming a senior research fellow at King's College London.

Wilkinson stood successfully for the Conservative Party as Wiltshire's police and crime commissioner at the by-election on 19 August 2021, after the May 2021 election had failed to elect a qualified candidate. He was re-elected for a further term of four years in May 2024.

== Honours ==
- December 1982: Member of the Order of the British Empire, for distinguished service in Northern Ireland
- June 1998: Officer of the Order of the British Empire, in the 1998 Birthday Honours
