= Arfon Jones =

Welsh politician and police officer

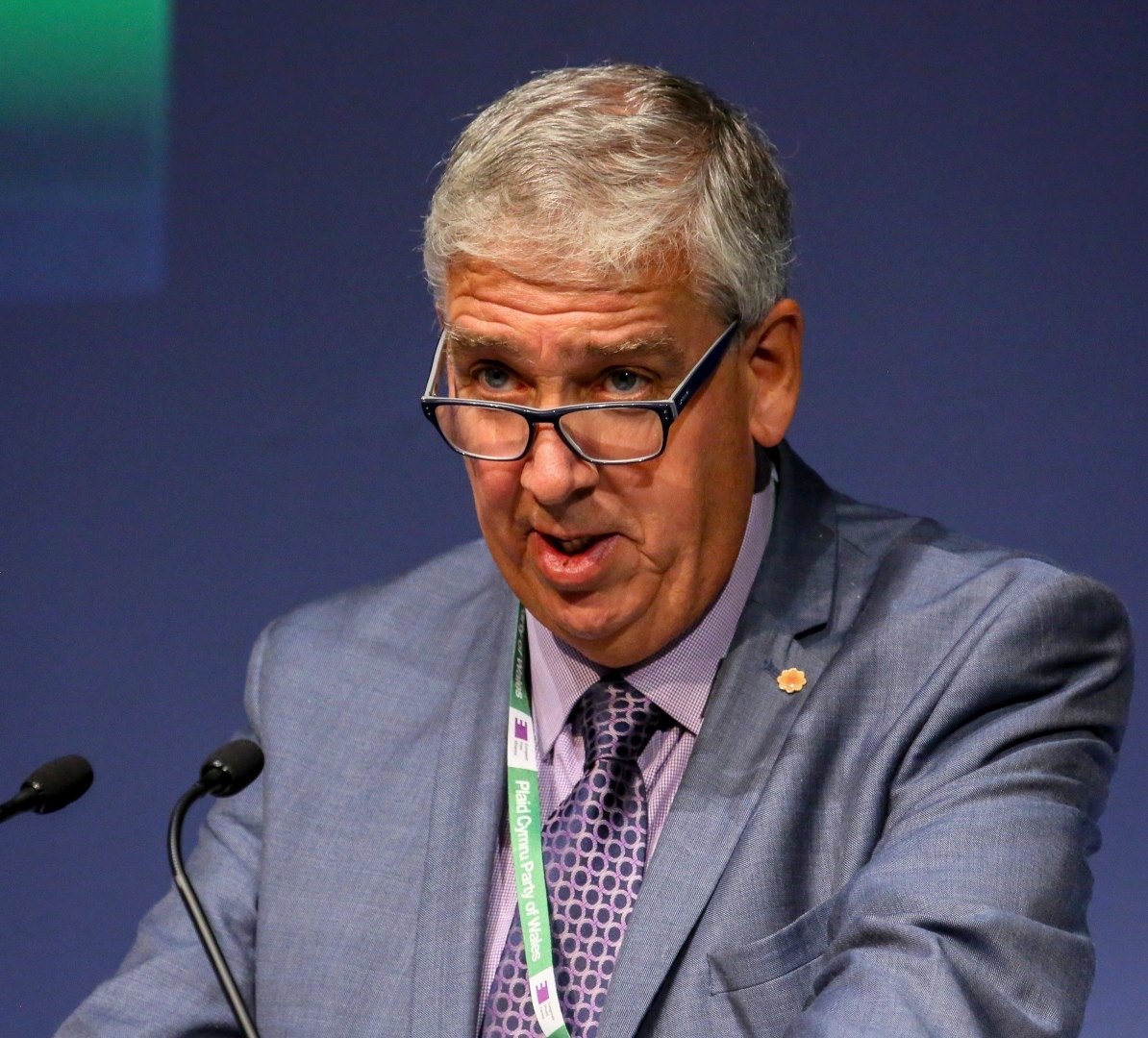
- Taken by Plaid Cymru photographer at the Plaid Cymru Conference.

North Wales Police and Crime Commissioner
- In office 12 May 2016 – 12 May 2021
- Preceded by: Winston Roddick
- Succeeded by: Andy Dunbobbin

Personal details
- Born: March 1955 (age 71)
- Party: Plaid Cymru (until 2021)

Owain Arfon Jones (born March 1955) is a Welsh police officer who was the Police and Crime Commissioner for North Wales Police from 2016 to 2021. He is a former member of Plaid Cymru.

== Police career ==
Jones had a long career in the North Wales Police, becoming Operational Inspector for the eastern division before retiring in 2008.

== Political career ==
=== County councillor ===
Jones served two full terms as county councillor for Gwersyllt West ward on Wrexham County Borough Council from 2008 until 2017. He was lead member for Children's Social Care in the Wrexham administration. In December 2012, Jones was reprimanded by the Chief Executive of the council for sending tweets from a council meeting, on the basis that council standing orders prohibiting TV or radio broadcasts of the proceedings included the phrase "transmitted in any way".

He stood as Plaid Cymru's candidate for the Wrexham constituency in the 2010 general election.

=== Police and Crime Commissioner ===
Jones was elected North Wales Police and Crime Commissioner in the May 2016 election, succeeding Winston Roddick. At the election his main campaigning issues were drug law reform and tackling domestic abuse. During his term he instigated a six-month trial in Flintshire of Naloxone, which acts as antidote to drugs overdoses, which was subsequently rolled out across North Wales.

The major decision during his term of office was the appointment in 2019 of Carl Foulkes as Chief Constable of North Wales Police.

He retired at the subsequent May 2021 election. He was succeeded by Andy Dunbobbin of the Labour Party.

=== Later activities ===
In October 2021, in the wake of Metropolitan Police officer Wayne Couzens being sentenced to life imprisonment for the murder of Sarah Everard, Jones called for an independent body to investigate domestic violence among police officers, and criticised those denying the "culture of sexism and misogyny" within the profession. He told The National Wales of his opinion that Couzens's behaviour was not unique, but rather a product of police culture. He said that senior police officers should take action against colleagues who act inappropriately.

After the fatal stabbing of Conservative MP David Amess in October 2021, Jones said the stabbing was the result of a "government that divides and rules and sows hate, fear and division" and concluded people would respond violently. He later apologised for his tweet as "untimely and offensive". Two days later, Jones left Plaid Cymru after criticising the party for a "lack of strategy and a lack of success", and called for a new leader.
