= Martyn Underhill =

British independent politician and former police officer

Martyn Underhill MBE

Dorset Police and Crime Commissioner
- In office 22 November 2012 – 12 May 2021
- Preceded by: Office created
- Succeeded by: David Sidwick

Personal details
- Born: Grantham, Lincolnshire
- Party: Independent Deborah Underhill

Martyn Underhill MBE is a British independent politician and former police officer who served as the Dorset Police and Crime Commissioner from 2012 to 2021.

He was a Detective Chief Inspector in Sussex Police, who retired in 2009 after 30 years of service. He joined the Metropolitan Police in 1979, transferring to Sussex Police in 1984.

== Police career ==
In July 2000, he was the Detective Inspector on Highdown Division who dealt with the disappearance of missing child Sarah Payne, who went missing in Littlehampton on the evening of 1 July. Detective Inspector Underhill was appointed as the Deputy SIO (Senior Investigating Officer) of the enquiry, which became a murder investigation after a body was found near Pulborough on 17 July and identified as that of Sarah Payne the following day. Underhill remained on the investigation until Roy Whiting was convicted of Sarah Payne's murder in December 2001 and sentenced to life imprisonment. He then became Project Manager of Child Rescue Alert, piloting it into Sussex Police in 2002. This alert system is based on Megan's Law in America. Underhill later took this to the Association of Chief Officers (ACPO) Homicide Working Group to ask for the pilot to be introduced nationally, which was achieved by 2006. Underhill was also an adviser [for one day] in the case of Holly Wells and Jessica Chapman, who were abducted and murdered. He then moved to the Training Department in Sussex Police, having qualified as a police trainer, assessor and verifier. On retirement he moved to Dorset. Underhill went on to campaign for safeguarding issues, including Sarah's Law, which was introduced into Dorset in October 2011. Underhill became the Laymember on his Local Safeguarding Children's Board, as well as becoming a trustee for the Bournefree charity. He was a visiting lecturer at Bournemouth University for the School of Applied Science. He is now a Senior Lecturer in Criminology at Bournemouth University. In July 2011, Underhill reported to Operation Weeting that he thought his police phone had been hacked during the Sarah Payne murdercase. Underhill was initially contacted by a source at The Sun newspaper warning him of how they were in possession of information from a reliable source alleging an inappropriate relationship between Underhill and Sara Payne during the investigation.

== Police and Crime Commissioner ==
In February 2012, Underhill declared himself as an independent candidate for the Dorset Police and Crime Commissioner role. In April 2012, Underhill launched his electoral campaign as Keep Politics out of Policing and won the election, becoming Dorset's first ever PCC.

In 2013, as Dorset PCC, Underhill was one of three PCC's nominated by their peers to review the role and remit of the Association of Chief Police Officers. The other PCC's who worked with him were Jane Kennedy and Matthew Ellis. The trio commissioned General Parker to review the organisation. His review recommended substantial changes, including the transition to a new organisation called the National Police Chiefs Council. The trio formed the "ACPO Transition Board" to achieve the changes working with senior officers from ACPO, the Home Office, MOPAC and the College of Policing. The PCC's appointed Sir Bill Jeffrey as Chair of the Transition Board. This led to the creation of the National Police Chiefs Council formally in April 2015. The first ever Chair was Sara Thornton.

In 2014, Underhill became the first PCC nationally to formally commission the charity Victim Support to provide victim services in his area.

In July 2015, Underhill announced that he would stand as a candidate in the following year's police and crime commissioner elections. His election manifesto was announced on 30 March 2016.

On 6 May, Underhill was re-elected as police and crime commissioner. He received 38% of the first preference votes, and was elected after the second preference votes were counted, when no candidates received more than 50% of first preference votes. The election turnout was 23%.

In December 2019, Underhill announced that he will not stand for re-election in 2020, but due to the COVID-19 pandemic he stood until the delayed election in 2021. He was succeeded by Conservative David Sidwick.

== Personal life ==
On 11 August 2023, his 39 year old son Benjamin Jon Underhill died following a severe head injury after exiting a moving car in Wimborne Minster.

Underhill was made MBE in the 2022 New Year Honours.
