= David Sidwick =

English politician

Dorset Police and Crime Commissioner
- Incumbent
- Assumed office 13 May 2021
- Preceded by: Martyn Underhill
- Majority: 26,926

Personal details
- Born: Bournemouth
- Party: Conservative
- Website: www.sidwick4dorset.org.uk

David John Sidwick is a British politician who was elected as the Conservative Dorset Police and Crime Commissioner in the 2021 England and Wales police and crime commissioner elections. He succeeded Martyn Underhill who did not run for re-election. He is the Association of Police and Crime Commissioners’ joint co-lead on substance misuse. He previously worked in the pharmaceutical industry and has called for cannabis to re-classified from Class B to Class A in the UK. He is the co-founder and managing director of STAC Consultancy Ltd and was a therapy director for pharmaceutical company Pfizer.

Sidwick was chairman of the Bournemouth West Conservative Association. Sidwick was re-elected in the 2024 England and Wales police and crime commissioner elections.

== Personal life ==
Sidwick was born and raised in Bournemouth. He was the chair of Governors at Bournemouth School between 2010 and 2021.
