= Temporary Labour Working Group =

UK industry consortium for agriculture

The Temporary Labour Working Group was a UK industry consortium set up to establish a set of minimum standards for employment agencies working in agriculture and horticulture. It was founded in September 2002, convened by the Ethical Trading Initiative and managed by Impactt Limited. It led to the passing of the Gangmasters (Licensing) Act 2004 and the formation of the Gangmasters Licensing Authority.

It produced a code of practice concerned with illegal and unsafe working. It states that "It is well known that some labour providers act illegally, by for example employing illegal workers, evading tax and not paying the minimum wage."

Employment agencies (called "labour providers") were audited to check on actual working conditions. Although signing up to the code was voluntary the Association of Labour Providers made it a requirement of membership and the Fresh Produce Consortium and the National Farmers Union recommended it.

The last audit took place on 12 May 2006. The industry is now regulated by the Gangmasters Licensing Authority.

== See also ==
- UK agency worker law
