= Andy Dunbobbin =

Welsh politician

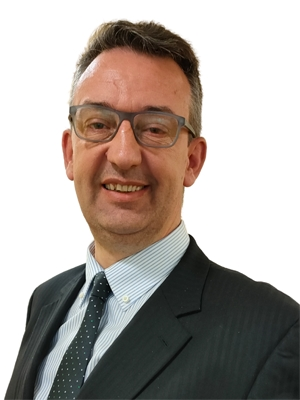
- Official portrait, 2024

Police and Crime Commissioner for North Wales
- Incumbent
- Assumed office 13 May 2021
- Preceded by: Arfon Jones

Member of Flintshire County Council for Connah's Quay Golftyn
- In office 18 June 2013 – 5 May 2022
- Preceded by: Peter Macfarlane

Personal details
- Born: January 1975 (age 50); Chester, Cheshire, England
- Political party: Labour
- Website: Official website

Andy Dunbobbin (born January 1975) is a British politician serving as Police and Crime Commissioner for North Wales since 2021. A member of the Labour Party, he was a member of Flintshire County Council from 2013 to 2022.

== Early career and election ==
Before being elected as North Wales Police and Crime Commissioner, Dunbobbin was a County Councillor representing Connah's Quay Golftyn ward on Flintshire County Council, having first been elected in 2013. He was also elected as a member of Connah's Quay Town Council in 2012 and continues to serve on the council following his election as PCC.

In March 2020, Dunbobbin was selected for the Welsh Labour Party to stand in the 2021 England and Wales police and crime commissioner elections for the North Wales region.

Dunbobbin was elected as the North Wales Police and Crime Commissioner, beating the Conservative candidate by 7,885 votes following the allocation of second preferences. His deputy is Wayne Jones.

== Personal life ==
Dunbobbin is married with two children.
