= Dorset Police and Crime Commissioner =

Elected official in England

- Incumbent; David Sidwick since 13 May 2021
- Police and crime commissioner of Dorset Police
- Reports to: Dorset Police and Crime Panel
- Appointer: Electorate of Dorset
- Term length: Four years
- Constituting instrument: Police Reform and Social Responsibility Act 2011
- Precursor: Dorset Police Authority
- Inaugural holder: Martyn Underhill
- Formation: 22 November 2012
- Deputy: Deputy Police and Crime Commissioner
- Salary: £73,300
- Website: www.dorset.pcc.police.uk

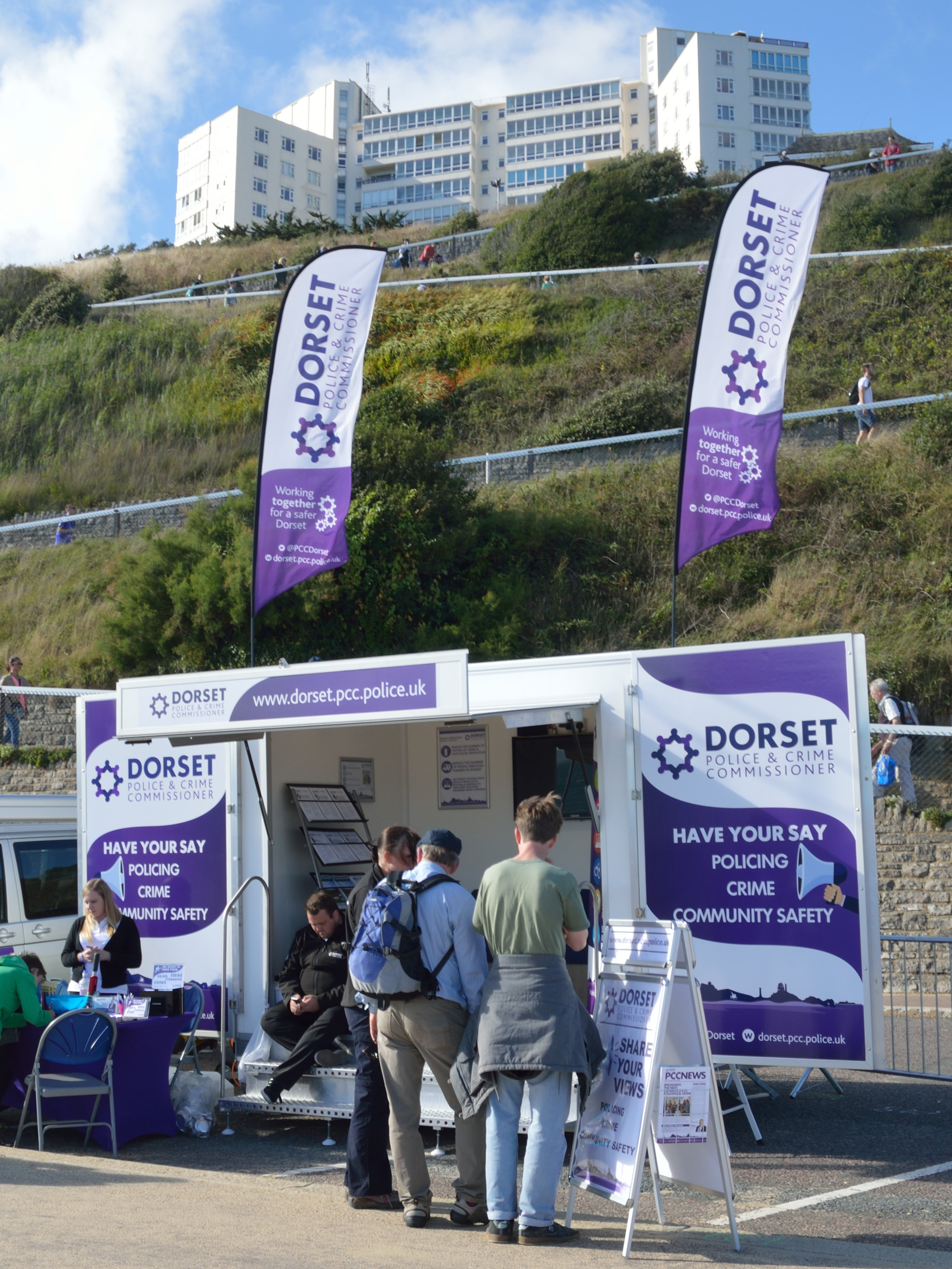
Dorset Police and Crime Commissioner publicity display during the Bournemouth Air Festival 2015

The Dorset Police and Crime Commissioner is the police and crime commissioner, an elected official tasked with setting out the way crime is tackled by Dorset Police in the English County of Dorset. The post was created in November 2012, following an election held on 15 November 2012, and replaced the Dorset Police Authority. The first incumbent is Independent Martyn Underhill, who retired in 2021. He was succeeded by David Sidwick.

== List of Dorset Police and Crime Commissioners ==
After 2028 PCCs will be scrapped by the government

Name	Political party	Dates in office
Martyn Underhill	Independent	22 November 2012 to 12 May 2021
David Sidwick	Conservative	13 May 2021 to 2028

== See also ==
- 2012 England and Wales police and crime commissioner elections
- 2016 England and Wales police and crime commissioner elections
- 2021 England and Wales police and crime commissioner elections
