= 2021 Wiltshire Police and Crime Commissioner by-election =

Election held in the United Kingdom in August 2021

The 2021 Wiltshire Police and Crime Commissioner by-election was a by-election for the position of police and crime commissioner in the Wiltshire Police area of the United Kingdom, held on 19 August 2021.

It was triggered after Jonathon Seed, the successful candidate in the 2021 Wiltshire police and crime commissioner election (held in May 2021, postponed from May 2020), did not deliver his acceptance of office by 7 July. This followed Seed announcing his withdrawal from the election on 9 May, in the interval between the vote and the count, after ITV News discovered that Seed had been convicted in 1993 of a 1992 drink driving offence. It was later discovered by ITV News that Seed had a second offence of failure to stop. These matters disqualified Seed from the role of Police and Crime Commissioner, as guidance published by the Electoral Commission says PCC candidates cannot seek election if they have been convicted of an offence punishable with a prison sentence, including spent convictions and those where a prison sentence was not given.

The by-election had to be held with 35 working days of the vacancy by virtue of Section 51 of the Police Reform and Social Responsibility Act 2011, thus the date was set for 19 August.

== Candidates ==
On 23 July 2021, Wiltshire Council published the statement of persons nominated, which confirmed that five people had been validly nominated to stand:

- Philip Wilkinson (Conservative), senior research fellow at King's College London.
- Brian Matthew (Liberal Democrat), member of Wiltshire Council and three-time parliamentary candidate for North Wiltshire.
- Junab Ali (Labour), member of Swindon Borough Council and Labour Party candidate in the prior May election.
- Mike Rees (Independent), former Detective Inspector for Wiltshire Police and Independent candidate in the prior May election.
- Julian Malins (Reform UK), former Barrister and former City of London councillor.

== Results ==
No candidate received 50% or more of the vote from first preference votes. After first preference votes were counted, Wilkinson and Rees were the two leading candidates, receiving 35.96% and 27.82% of first preference votes respectively. After second preference votes were counted, Wilkinson was declared the winner, receiving 52.02% of the vote in the second round. Turnout for the election was 16.63%.

2021 Wiltshire Police and Crime Commissioner by-election
Party	Candidate	1st round		2nd round			1st round votesTransfer votes, 2nd round
Party	Candidate	Total	Of round	Transfers	Total	Of round	1st round votesTransfer votes, 2nd round
Conservative	Philip Wilkinson	32,564	36.0%	5,188	37,752	52.02%	
Independent	Mike Rees	25,197	27.8%	9,618	34,815	47.98%	
Liberal Democrats	Brian Matthew	17,966	19.8%				
Labour	Junab Ali	12,971	14.3%				
Reform	Julian Malins	1,859	2.1%				
Turnout		91,553	16.63%				
Rejected ballots		996	1.08%				
Conservative hold							

== Previous result ==
2021 Wiltshire police and crime commissioner election
Party	Candidate	1st round		2nd round			1st round votesTransfer votes, 2nd round
Party	Candidate	Total	Of round	Transfers	Total	Of round	1st round votesTransfer votes, 2nd round
Conservative	Jonathon Seed	84,885	41.06%	15,118	100,003	63.26%	
Liberal Democrats	Liz Webster	35,013	16.94%	23,061	58,074	36.74%	
Labour	Junab Ali	34,147	16.52%				
Independent	Mike Rees	31,722	15.35%				
Green	Brig Ourbridge	16,606	8.03%				
Reform	Julian Malins	4,348	2.10%				
Turnout		206,721					
