= Zoë Metcalfe =

British politician and North Yorkshire Police, Fire and Crime Commissioner

North Yorkshire Police, Fire and Crime Commissioner
- In office 26 November 2021 – 7 May 2024
- Preceded by: Philip Allott
- Succeeded by: Office abolished

Member of North Yorkshire County Council for Knaresborough
- In office 4 May 2017 – 5 May 2022

Member of Harrogate Borough Council for Claro
- In office 8 May 2018 – 1 December 2022

Personal details
- Party: Conservative

Zoë Metcalfe is a British Conservative politician. She was elected to the post of North Yorkshire Police, Fire and Crime Commissioner in November 2021, in a by-election that was called due to the resignation of Philip Allott following his remarks on the murder of Sarah Everard.

Metcalfe was also an elected member of North Yorkshire County Council for the Knaresborough division, and of Harrogate Borough Council for the Claro ward.

She has twice stood as a parliamentary candidate for the Conservative Party, contesting the Doncaster Central constituency in 2015 and Leeds West in 2017.

Political offices
Preceded by Philip Allott	North Yorkshire Police, Fire and Crime Commissioner; 2021–2024	Succeeded by Office abolished
