= North Yorkshire Police, Fire and Crime Commissioner =

Elected police and fire commissioner for North Yorkshire, England

North Yorkshire police, fire and crime commissioner
- Police, fire and crime commissioner of North Yorkshire Police and North Yorkshire Fire and Rescue Service
- Reports to: North Yorkshire Police, Fire and Crime Panel
- Appointer: Electorate of North Yorkshire
- Term length: Four years
- Constituting instrument: Police Reform and Social Responsibility Act 2011
- Precursor: North Yorkshire Police Authority
- Inaugural holder: Julia Mulligan
- Formation: 22 November 2012
- Abolished: 7 May 2024
- Deputy: Deputy police and crime commissioner
- Salary: £74,400
- Website: www.northyorkshire-pfcc.gov.uk

The North Yorkshire police, fire and crime commissioner was the police and crime commissioner, an elected official responsible for overseeing how crime and community safety are tackled, and for providing services for victims of crime, holding North Yorkshire Police to account in the English County of North Yorkshire.

The post was created in November 2012, following an election held on 15 November 2012, and replaced the North Yorkshire Police Authority.

On 15 November 2018, Police and Crime Commissioner Julia Mulligan became the North Yorkshire police, fire & crime commissioner, taking over the governance of North Yorkshire Fire and Rescue Service.

Commissioner Philip Allott of the Conservative Party was elected on 13 May 2021 and replaced Julia Mulligan. He resigned on 15 October 2021 following comments surrounding the murder of Sarah Everard.

The last commissioner was Zoë Metcalfe of the Conservative Party, who was elected in the 25 November 2021 by-election.

The PFCC was abolished and its functions were transferred to the Mayor of North Yorkshire from 7 May 2024.

== List of office holders ==
| Name | Political party | From | To |
|---|---|---|---|
| Julia Mulligan | Conservative | 22 November 2012 | 12 May 2021 |
| Philip Allott | Conservative | 13 May 2021 | 16 October 2021 |
| Jenni Newberry (acting) | Independent | 4 November 2021 | 26 November 2021 |
| Zoë Metcalfe | Conservative | 26 November 2021 | 7 May 2024 |

== Elections ==
North Yorkshire police and crime commissioner election, 2012
| Party | Candidate | 1st round | | 2nd round | | | 1st round votesTransfer votes, 2nd round |
| Party | Candidate | Total | Of round | Transfers | Total | Of round | 1st round votesTransfer votes, 2nd round |
|---|---|---|---|---|---|---|---|
| Conservative | Julia Mulligan | 47,885 | 58.25% | | | | |
| Labour | Ruth Potter | 34,328 | 41.75% | | | | |
| Turnout | | 82,213 | 13.3% | | | | |
| Rejected ballots | | 6,400 | | | | | |
| Total votes | | | | | | | |
| Registered electors | | | | | | | |
| Conservative win | | | | | | | |

As the North Yorkshire Authority contest involved only two candidates, a traditional 'first-past-the-post' system was implemented. In all the police crime commissioners' elections in 2012, North Yorkshire had the highest percentage (7.2%) of spoiled or rejected ballots.

North Yorkshire Police and Crime Commissioner election, 2016
| Party | Candidate | 1st round | | 2nd round | | | 1st round votesTransfer votes, 2nd round |
| Party | Candidate | Total | Of round | Transfers | Total | Of round | 1st round votesTransfer votes, 2nd round |
|---|---|---|---|---|---|---|---|
| Conservative | Julia Mulligan | 53,078 | 40.1% | 11,940 | 65,018 | 59.2% | |
| Labour | Steve Howley | 34,351 | 26.0% | 10,408 | 44,759 | 40.8% | |
| Independent | Mike Pannett | 30,984 | 23.4% | | | | |
| Liberal Democrats | James Blanchard | 13,856 | 10.5% | | | | |
| Turnout | | 132,269 | 22.5% | | | | |
| Rejected ballots | | 3,372 | 2.5% | | | | |
| Total votes | | 135,641 | | | | | |
| Registered electors | | 603,707 | | | | | |
| Conservative hold | | | | | | | |

Region totals for eliminated candidates were not available and at time of retrieval, only some of the electoral authorities had results from 2016 available online.

North Yorkshire police, fire and crime commissioner election, 2021
| Party | Candidate | 1st round | | 2nd round | | | 1st round votesTransfer votes, 2nd round |
| Party | Candidate | Total | Of round | Transfers | Total | Of round | 1st round votesTransfer votes, 2nd round |
|---|---|---|---|---|---|---|---|
| Conservative | Philip Allott | 73,657 | 46.75% | 10,080 | 83,737 | 61.04% | |
| Labour | Alison Hume | 40,803 | 25.89% | 12,639 | 53,442 | 38.96% | |
| Independent | Keith Tordoff | 23,308 | 14.79% | | | | |
| Liberal Democrats | James Barker | 19,773 | 12.57% | | | | |
| Turnout | | 157,541 | 25.4% | | | | |
| Rejected ballots | | | | | | | |
| Total votes | | | | | | | |
| Registered electors | | | | | | | |
| Conservative hold | | | | | | | |

2021 North Yorkshire police, fire and crime commissioner by-election
| Party | Candidate | 1st round | | 2nd round | | | 1st round votesTransfer votes, 2nd round |
| Party | Candidate | Total | Of round | Transfers | Total | Of round | 1st round votesTransfer votes, 2nd round |
|---|---|---|---|---|---|---|---|
| Conservative | Zoë Metcalfe | 34,385 | 39.5% | 7,375 | 41,760 | 60.8% | |
| Labour | Emma Scott-Spivey | 18,094 | 20.8% | 8,801 | 26,895 | 39.2% | |
| Independent | Keith Tordoff | 14,988 | 17.2% | | | | |
| Liberal Democrats | James Barker | 9,499 | 10.9% | | | | |
| Women's Equality | Hannah Barham-Brown | 8,837 | 10.2% | | | | |
| Turnout | | 85,808 | 13.8% | | | | |
| Rejected ballots | | 1,165 | 0.2% | | | | |
| Total votes | | 86,973 | 13.9% | | | | |
| Registered electors | | 623,821 | | | | | |
| Conservative hold | | | | | | | |
