= Gangmasters and Labour Abuse Authority =

Non-departmental public body in the United Kingdom

Agency overview
- Formed: 1 April 2005
- Dissolved: 7 April 2026
- Superseding agency: Fair Work Agency
- Type: Non-Departmental Public Body
- Jurisdiction: United Kingdom
- Headquarters: Nottingham, England, United Kingdom
- Employees: 128 (2022/23)
- Agency executives: Elysia McCaffrey, Chief Executive; Julia Mulligan, Chair of the Gangmasters and Labour Abuse Authority
- Parent agency: Home Office
- Website: www.gla.gov.uk

The Gangmasters and Labour Abuse Authority (GLAA) was the foremost intelligence and investigative agency for labour exploitation in the UK. Its role was to work in partnership with police and other law enforcement agencies such as the National Crime Agency to protect vulnerable and exploited workers and disrupt and dismantle serious and organised crime. The agency was headquartered at Loxley House in Nottingham, England. In April 2026 it became part of the Fair Work Agency.

== History ==
The Gangmasters Licensing Authority (GLA) was established on 1 April 2005 by the Gangmasters (Licensing) Act 2004, passed in the aftermath of the 2004 Morecambe Bay cockling disaster. The authority was handed a remit of preventing the exploitation of workers in the fresh produce sector — agriculture, horticulture, shellfish gathering, and all associated processing and packaging.

Initially, the authority sat under the control of the Department for Environment, Food and Rural Affairs (Defra) but on 9 April 2014 it was transferred to the control of the Home Office. In making the announcement, Prime Minister David Cameron stated that the move would ‘strengthen its enforcement and intelligence capabilities’ by putting it directly alongside the considerable resources of the National Crime Agency.

On 30 April 2017, the GLA was renamed the Gangmasters and Labour Abuse Authority (GLAA) as part of reforms under the Immigration Act 2016.

The government invested an additional £2 million to extend the authority's remit, allowing it to prevent, detect, and investigate worker exploitation across the entire economy.

Specialist Labour Abuse Prevention Officers (LAPOs) were given powers under the Police and Criminal Evidence Act 1984 to investigate labour market offences, including the forced or compulsory labour element of modern slavery, across England and Wales.

A new Joint Slavery and Trafficking Analysis Centre opened in April 2017. The dedicated unit - made up of analysts from the National Crime Agency, police, Border Force, Immigration Enforcement, HM Revenue and Customs, and the GLAA - mirrors a joint working model successfully used to gather intelligence on terrorism.

The Immigration Act 2016 also created the position of the Director of Labour Market Enforcement, which provides strategic direction for organisations regulating the UK labour market:

- GLAA
- HM Revenue and Customs' National Minimum Wage unit
- Employment Agency Standards Inspectorate

The first Director of Labour Market Enforcement was Sir David Metcalf, who served until June 2019. The position is currently held by Margaret Beels, who had previously served as chair of the GLAA and its predecessor agency for more than 10 years.

In July 2019, the government opened a public consultation on plans to establish a new single labour market enforcement body as a feature of its overall Good Work Plan. This would combine the GLAA, HM Revenue and Customs' National Minimum Wage unit, and the Employment Agency Standards Inspectorate into one agency tackling labour exploitation and enforcing workers' rights. The outcome of the consultation supported the proposal. As of December 2022 legislation to create a single enforcement body has not yet been enacted and the delay with progressing the proposal has been widely criticised by organisations supporting vulnerable workers.

In its 2024 election manifesto, the Labour Party proposed the creation of a Fair Work Agency, which would consolidate the powers of the GLAA and those of the Director of Labour Enforcement. The Employment Rights Act 2025 became law on 18 December 2025 and the GLAA became part of the Fair Work Agency on 7 April 2026.

== Enforcement ==
The GLAA investigated circumstances where there is a risk of worker exploitation by gathering intelligence and working with police, government departments, and other enforcement agencies to target, dismantle and disrupt serious and organised crime across the UK labour market.

The Gangmasters (Licensing) Act 2004 established four specific offences:

- Operating as a gangmaster without a licence
- Obtaining or possessing a false licence or false documentation likely to cause another person to believe that a person acting as a gangmaster is licensed
- Entering into arrangements/using an unlicensed gangmaster
- Obstructing enforcement officers/compliance officers exercising their functions under the Act

In England and Wales, the GLAA used the Modern Slavery Act 2015 to investigate forced or compulsory labour and human trafficking offences.

The Immigration Act 2016 also introduced Labour Market Enforcement Undertakings (LMEUs) and Labour Market Enforcement Orders (LMEOs) which could be used as an alternative or additional sanction for breaches of labour market legislation. The first LMEO in the UK was issued following a GLAA investigation into a couple from Leicester who illegally supplied workers to food factories in the city.

== Regulation ==
The GLAA operated a licensing scheme regulating businesses who provide workers to the fresh produce supply chain, to make sure they meet the employment standards required by law.

Labour providers were assessed by GLAA compliance officers to check they were meeting the authority's licensing standards which cover health and safety, accommodation, pay, transport and training.

Employment agencies, labour providers and gangmasters who supply workers to the sectors listed below need a GLAA licence:

- Agriculture
- Horticulture
- Shellfish gathering
- Any associated processing and packaging

It is a criminal offence to supply workers without a licence or use an unlicensed labour provider. The maximum penalty for acting as an unlicensed gangmaster is 10 years in prison and an unlimited fine.

== Prevention ==
The GLAA had a key role in working with businesses to prevent exploitation from happening in the first place. In October 2017, the authority launched the Construction Protocol, which is aimed at eradicating slavery and labour exploitation in the building industry.

The protocol commits signatories to:

- Work in partnership with the GLAA to protect vulnerable workers
- Share information, where possible, to help stop or prevent the exploitation of workers
- Work together to manage information sensitively and confidentially
- Raise awareness within supply chains
- Maintain momentum by communicating regularly

This protocol was followed by the creation of the Apparel and General Merchandise Public Private Protocol in November 2018, which has the same principles as the Construction Protocol but with a focus on the textiles industry.

The GLAA also worked with the Downstream Fuel Association and other partners to set up the Responsible Car Wash Scheme, a project to tackle exploitation and non-compliance at hand car washes. It is supported by Tesco, Sainsbury's, Morrisons, ASDA, and Waitrose, all of whom joined the scheme to ensure that operators on their sites were abiding by the regulations.

== Governance ==
The GLAA was a non-departmental public body governed by an independent Board and Chair appointed by the Home Secretary. It had eight members and was responsible for ensuring the GLAA fulfilled its role of working in partnership to protect vulnerable and exploited workers.

The agency also sat alongside HM Revenue and Customs' National Minimum Wage unit and the Employment Agency Standards Inspectorate within the scope of the Director of Labour Market Enforcement (DLME), which set the priorities for the organisations tackling labour market offences.

== See also ==
- 2004 Morecambe Bay cockling disaster
- Agency Workers Directive
- Temporary Labour Working Group
- United Kingdom agency worker law
- Modern Slavery Act 2015
