= The National (Wales) =

Welsh daily newspaper (2021–22)

- Type: Daily newspaper
- Format: Compact
- Owner: USA Today Co.
- Publisher: Newsquest
- Editor: Gavin Thompson
- Founded: 1 March 2021; 4 years ago
- Ceased publication: August 2022
- Political alignment: Apolitical
- Headquarters: Wales, UK
- Website: www.thenational.wales

The National was a Welsh daily news website owned by Newsquest and compact newspaper. Gavin Thompson was the editor, while three journalists – audience and content editor Michael Sweet and reporter Gareth Axenderrie have been taken on to work for the title; Rachel Nurse, another reporter, died in October 2021. Unlike the Scottish outlet of the same name, The National took no political stance and claimed to simply be "pro-Wales". It became a weekly newspaper from 17 April 2021, but ceased print in November of that year. Its closure was announced in August 2022, and the website was taken offline by the original operator.

== History ==
The National was founded by Huw Marshall, who wanted to "challenge the dominant incumbents who provide news from a UK perspective". Thompson said the media landscape in Wales struggled to match that of Scotland, where the public have the choice between several national newspaper titles as well as Scottish editions of UK papers. He said, "Wales doesn't really have that in the same way and we really feel it should. It's really been very stark during the Covid pandemic where a large number of people take their news from sources that are writing it from an English perspective."

The National launched three days after another Welsh news website, Herald.Wales.

Within three weeks of launching, The National had 430 paid-up subscribers and announced a target of 1,000. Thompson stated that if the paper reached this target, a full-time political correspondent would be hired.

The newspaper began being published weekly from 14 April 2021, but on 13 November 2021, editor Gavin Thompson announced that, after just seven months, the newspaper would cease to be published in print form, but would continue as a website.

It was announced on 25 August 2022 that The National would close down due to declining subscriptions as a result of the economic crisis. Thompson announced the paper's closure on 31 August 2022.

After the website's closure, the domain was purchased in 2023 by an unknown party and the domain temporarily hosted "explainer" articles likely produced by artificial intelligence (AI). The "sham" site was later relaunched containing further AI-generated content, articles taken from other publications and content from the original operator. The relaunched site was registered in Iceland, while the operator was from Pakistan, and shut down the site when questioned by WalesOnline. Neither of the relaunched sites were linked to Newsquest, the original operator of The National.

== Reception ==
Kevin Ward, the former editor of the South Wales Argus, called The National "a good read, providing you have an interest in Wales and politics". In his review of the paper, he urged it to take an explicitly pro-Welsh independence editorial stance in order to exploit a "real gap in the Welsh media market". He added, "I'll watch its progress with interest, but I can't help but wonder whether the real gap in the Welsh media market – a niche identified by Newsquest some years ago with daily newspaper The National in Scotland – is for a national title that supports Welsh independence, particularly as the cross-party YesCymru movement has seen such a surge of interest in recent months."

== See also ==
- List of newspapers in Wales
- List of newspapers by date
