= Barry Coppinger =

Former police commissioner in England

Cleveland Police and Crime Commissioner
- In office 22 November 2012 – 8 September 2020
- Preceded by: Office created
- Succeeded by: Lisa Oldroyd (acting)

Personal details
- Party: Labour

Barry Coppinger is a former British politician, who was the Cleveland Police and Crime Commissioner between 2012 and 2020. He was the inaugural holder of the post and was elected on 15 November 2012, for the Labour Party. He held the seat until he resigned in September 2020, citing the stress of his role and the effect that it was having on his health.

== Background ==
Barry Coppinger has been involved in local politics for 29 years, first as a Councillor and later as Police and Crime Commissioner. He has represented a number of wards in Middlesbrough with his last before election being Pallister Park in the east of Middlesbrough. Coppinger has also served on the Executive of Middlesbrough Borough Council, holding the Social Care portfolio.

In addition to being a Councillor, Coppinger was also on the Cleveland Police Authority, Cleveland Crime & Disorder Reduction Partnership and Cleveland Joint Emergency Planning Committee.

Preceded by Post Created	Cleveland Police and Crime Commissioner; 22 November 2012 – 8 September 2020	Succeeded by Lisa Oldroyd (Acting)
