= Durham Police and Crime Commissioner =

Elected official in northern England

- Incumbent; Joy Allen since 13 May 2021
- Police and Crime Commissioner of Durham Constabulary
- Reports to: Durham Police and Crime Panel
- Appointer: Electorate of County Durham and Darlington
- Term length: Four years
- Constituting instrument: Police Reform and Social Responsibility Act 2011
- Precursor: Durham Police Authority
- Inaugural holder: Ron Hogg
- Formation: 22 November 2012
- Deputy: Deputy Police and Crime Commissioner
- Salary: £73,300
- Website: https://www.durham-pcc.gov.uk

The Durham Police and Crime Commissioner is the elected official who sets out the way crime is tackled by Durham Constabulary in the English county of County Durham. The post was created in November 2012, following an election held on 15 November 2012, and replaced the Durham Police Authority.

The first holder of the post was Ron Hogg, who represented the Labour Party. He died on 17 December 2019. The position was then held by Steve White, in an acting capacity. White was appointed by the Labour-controlled Durham Police and Crime Panel on 20 September 2019, after Hogg fell ill. White was a former official of the Police Federation. He had been the chief executive officer of the Durham Police and Crime Commissioner's office before his appointment.

At the 2021 local elections, Labour's Joy Allen was elected as the police and crime commissioner and her friend, Nigel Bryson, was appointed as her deputy. Durham had never before had a deputy police and crime commissioner. Bryson's appointment sparked claims of 'nepotism' and a member of the Police and Crime Panel suggested it was a 'job for the boys'. Allen was re-elected to the position in May 2024.

== List of Durham police and crime commissioners ==
Name	Political party	From	To
Ron Hogg	Labour	22 November 2012	17 December 2019
Steven White (acting)	n/a	20 September 2019	12 May 2021
Joy Allen	Labour	13 May 2021	Incumbent

== Elections ==
Durham Police and Crime Commissioner election, 2024
Party	Candidate	Votes	%	±%
Labour Co-op	Joy Allen	66,752		
Conservative	Rob Potts	37,773		
Liberal Democrats	Nigel Frederick Boddy	14,678		
