= North Wales Police and Crime Commissioner =

Elected official responsible for the effective policing of North Wales

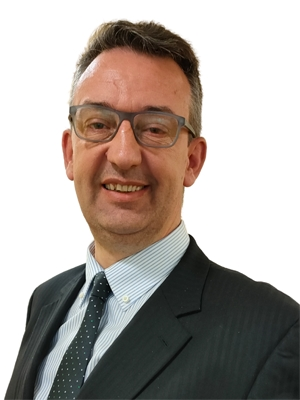
- Incumbent; Andy Dunbobbin since 13 May 2021
- Police and crime commissioner of North Wales Police
- Reports to: North Wales Police and Crime Panel
- Appointer: Electorate of Conwy, Denbighshire, Flintshire, Gwynedd, Anglesey and Wrexham.
- Term length: Four years
- Constituting instrument: Police Reform and Social Responsibility Act 2011
- Precursor: North Wales Police Authority
- Inaugural holder: Winston Roddick
- Formation: 22 November 2012
- Deputy: Deputy Police and Crime Commissioner
- Salary: £73,300 (as determined by the Home Office)
- Website: www.northwales-pcc.gov.uk

The North Wales Police and Crime Commissioner is the police and crime commissioner, an elected official tasked with setting out the way crime is tackled by North Wales Police in the Welsh principal areas of Anglesey, Conwy, Denbighshire, Flintshire, Gwynedd and Wrexham. The post was created in November 2012, following an election held on 15 November 2012, and replaced the North Wales Police Authority. The current incumbent is Andy Dunbobbin, who represents the Labour Party.

== List of North Wales Police and Crime Commissioners ==
Name	Portrait	Political party	From	To
Winston Roddick		Independent	22 November 2012	11 May 2016
Arfon Jones		Plaid Cymru	12 May 2016	12 May 2021
Andy Dunbobbin		Labour	13 May 2021	Incumbent
