= Cleveland Police and Crime Commissioner =

Elected police official for the former county of Cleveland in England

- Incumbent; Matt Storey since 9 May 2024
- Police and crime commissioner of Cleveland Police
- Reports to: Cleveland Police and Crime Panel
- Appointer: Electorate of the former county of Cleveland
- Term length: Four years
- Constituting instrument: Police Reform and Social Responsibility Act 2011
- Precursor: Cleveland Police Authority
- Inaugural holder: Barry Coppinger
- Formation: 22 November 2012
- Deputy: Deputy Police and Crime Commissioner
- Salary: £73,300
- Website: www.cleveland.pcc.police.uk

The Cleveland Police and Crime Commissioner is the police and crime commissioner (PCC), an elected official tasked with setting out the way crime is tackled by Cleveland Police in the area of the former county of Cleveland in England. The post was created in November 2012, following an election held on 15 November 2012, and replaced the Cleveland Police Authority. The incumbent PCC is Matt Storey, who was elected in May 2024. The Office of the Cleveland Police and Crime Commissioner currently employs 35 staff.

== List of Cleveland Police and Crime Commissioners ==
Name	Political party	From	To
Barry Coppinger	Labour	22 November 2012	8 September 2020
Lisa Oldroyd (acting)	Independent	15 September 2020	12 May 2021
Steve Turner	Conservative	13 May 2021	8 May 2024
Matt Storey	Labour Co-op	9 May 2024	Incumbent

== Elections ==
Cleveland Police and Crime Commissioner election, 2024
Party	Candidate	Votes	%	±%
Labour Co-op	Matt Storey	65,418		
Conservative	Steve Turner	58,977		
