= Wiltshire Police and Crime Commissioner =

Police and crime commissioner for Wiltshire, England

- Incumbent; Philip Wilkinson since 20 August 2021
- Police and crime commissioner of Wiltshire Police
- Reports to: Wiltshire Police and Crime Panel
- Appointer: Electorate of Wiltshire
- Term length: Four years
- Constituting instrument: Police Reform and Social Responsibility Act 2011
- Precursor: Wiltshire Police Authority
- Inaugural holder: Angus Macpherson
- Formation: 22 November 2012
- Deputy: Deputy Police and Crime Commissioner
- Salary: £73,300
- Website: www.wiltshire-pcc.gov.uk

The Wiltshire police and crime commissioner is the police and crime commissioner (PCC), an elected official tasked with setting out the way crime is tackled by Wiltshire Police in the English county of Wiltshire. The post was created in November 2012, following an election held on 15 November 2012, and replaced the Wiltshire Police Authority. The incumbent until May 2021 was Angus Macpherson, a Conservative Party candidate.

The PCC's office is within Wiltshire Police headquarters, Devizes.

Owing to the COVID-19 pandemic, the election due to be held in May 2020 was postponed to 6 May 2021, as were all other local elections.

The incumbent PCC is Philip Wilkinson, who was first elected on 19 August 2021, following a re-run of the May 2021 election.

== List of Wiltshire Police and Crime Commissioners ==
Name	Political party	Election	From	To
Angus Macpherson	Conservative	2012 2016	22 November 2012	12 May 2021
Kieran Kilgallen (acting)	Independent	Didn't run in election	11 July 2021	19 August 2021
Philip Wilkinson	Conservative	2021 2024	20 August 2021	Incumbent

== 2021 election re-run ==
Jonathon Seed, the Conservative candidate, withdrew from the contest in the interval between the vote and the count when it emerged that (if elected) he would be disbarred owing to a spent conviction for drink driving. Seed said he had been advised by his party that the offence would not affect his application and that he had believed he was eligible, although it was reported that Conservative headquarters were unaware of the offence until a few days before the count. Seed went on to win the election on second preferences.

Wiltshire Police asked Thames Valley Police to investigate the candidacy, "to ensure independent oversight and to remove any potential conflict of interest". Seed was later charged with making a false declaration. He chose to be tried by jury and his case was set to be heard on 18 July 2022. The Crown Prosecution Service decided to discontinue the case in June 2022, and the following month a 'not guilty' verdict was recorded at Oxford Crown Court.

The cost of a re-run election was expected to be more than £1 million. The re-run was held on 19 August 2021. Legislation states that the office becomes vacant two months after a person elected to the office fails to deliver their acceptance (i.e. on 12 July) and requires an election to be held within the subsequent 35 days. To cover the vacancy between 12 July and 19 August, the Wiltshire Police and Crime Panel appointed Kieran Kilgallen, chief executive of the Office of the Police and Crime Commissioner, as acting police and crime commissioner.

== See also ==
- 2021 England and Wales police and crime commissioner elections § Wiltshire Police
- 2016 England and Wales police and crime commissioner elections § Wiltshire Police
- 2012 England and Wales police and crime commissioner elections § Wiltshire Police
