= Angus Macpherson =

British Police Commissioner

Angus Macpherson MBE DL
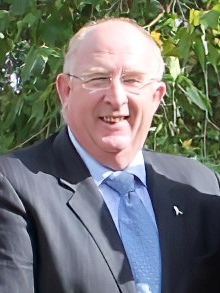

Wiltshire Police and Crime Commissioner
- In office 22 November 2012 – 12 May 2021
- Preceded by: Office created
- Succeeded by: Philip Wilkinson

Personal details
- Born: January 1953 (age 73)
- Party: Conservative

Angus Stuart Macpherson MBE DL (born January 1953) served as the Conservative Wiltshire Police and Crime Commissioner from 2012 to 2021. He was the first holder of the post.

== Early life and career ==
Macpherson was educated at St Hugh's School, near Faringdon, and at Dauntsey's School, West Lavington (where he is now a Governor). On leaving school he worked for Hoover Ltd in London as a management trainee, and obtained a degree in Business Studies. In 1976 he joined Turquand Barton Mayhew, later to become part of Ernst & Young, as an articled clerk, qualifying as chartered accountant in 1980. Macpherson established his own accountancy business in Swindon in 1986, and served as a magistrate and borough councillor.

Macpherson served on Wiltshire Police Authority for seven years prior to his election as PCC. In 2011, he lived at Wroughton.

== Police and crime commissioner elections, 2012 ==
The November 2012 election was noted for having the lowest turnout of all the PCC elections held that day, with just under 16% of registered voters casting a ballot; unofficial counting showed only a 10% turnout in the town of Devizes. Wiltshire was the only county to return an overnight result. Macpherson secured 36% of the initial vote, and won the election with second preference votes.

He assumed his role overseeing Wiltshire Police on 22 November 2012, and his first Police and Crime Plan was published in March 2013.

== Police and crime commissioner elections, 2016 ==
With an increased voter turnout of 24.7% at the 2016 election, he was able to increase his first preference votes by 10% to just over 46.2%, and again won the election through second preference votes.

In April 2019, Macpherson said he would not seek re-election in May 2020. However, in March 2020 the next election was postponed to May 2021 under the Coronavirus Act 2020, with the effect of extending his term of office by one year.

== Honours and appointments ==
Macpherson was commissioned a Deputy Lieutenant of Wiltshire in 2011.

He was appointed Member of the Order of the British Empire (MBE) in the 2017 Birthday Honours for services to the community in Wiltshire.

Police appointments
Preceded by Post Created	Wiltshire Police and Crime Commissioner; 2012–2021	Succeeded by Philip Wilkinson
