= Steve Turner (police commissioner) =

Cleveland Police and Crime Commissioner

Cleveland Police and Crime Commissioner
- In office 13 May 2021 – 8 May 2024
- Preceded by: Lisa Oldroyd (acting)
- Succeeded by: Matt Storey

Personal details
- Born: Stephen Mark Turner; October 1971 (age 54)
- Party: Conservative
- Other political affiliations: UKIP (before 2017)
- Spouse: Andrea Turner

Stephen Mark Turner (born October 1971) is a British Conservative Party politician who served as the Cleveland Police and Crime Commissioner from 2021 to 2024. He was elected on 13 May 2021, for the Conservative Party. He was replaced by Matthew Stephen Storey in May 2024.

== Background ==
Steve Turner worked for Safeway as a manager until the early 1990s, when he resigned after accepting a police caution for handling stolen goods. He later was the chief of staff for two MPs. Turner was elected as a UKIP Councillor for the Longbeck Ward of Redcar and Cleveland Borough Council on 7 May 2015 after receiving 19.8% of the vote. He defected to the Conservative Party in 2017.

== Police and crime commissioner ==
In May 2021, Turner stood as the Conservative Party candidate in the Cleveland PCC election and was elected after winning 54% of votes in the first round. Turner assumed the role on 13 May, replacing the acting PCC, Lisa Oldroyd.

In September 2021, Labour MP Andy McDonald named Turner in parliament using Parliamentary privilege wrongly alleging Turner was sacked from a previous employer for "systematic theft". Turner later admitted that he received a police caution in the 1990s for handling £15 of stolen goods, and voluntarily resigned from his position of store manager at Safeway in Norton.

In November 2021, it was reported that Turner was being investigated over a historical sexual assault claim. The investigation was being managed by the Independent Office for Police Conduct and conducted by a force external to Cleveland Police. Turner rejected calls to resign over the claim, maintaining his complete innocence, and was not suspended from the Conservative Party despite calls from the Labour Shadow Home Secretary Nick Thomas-Symonds. In May 2022 the investigation was discontinued with no action taken against him.

In May 2023, Turner stood for election as a councillor on Redcar and Cleveland Borough Council alongside his PCC role. Turner finished 5th out of 6 candidates with 12% of the vote. His wife also failed to be elected.

At the same election, it was alleged by Sky News, that he had used his position as Police & Crime Commissioner to investigate at least two opposition Labour candidates, and one unnamed extra. Turner strongly denied this and a subsequent complaint to the police and crime panel resulted in no action on any wrongdoing being taken. Liberal Democrat Home Affairs spokesperson Alistair Carmichael has called on Turner to resign, or for Prime Minister Rishi Sunak to suspend Turner's membership.

== Personal life ==
Turner is married to former Redcar and Cleveland Borough Councillor Andrea Turner and has three adult sons. He is also a grandfather.

Preceded by Lisa Oldroyd (Acting)	Cleveland Police and Crime Commissioner; 13 May 2021 – Present	Incumbent
