= Julia Mulligan =

Senior independent director in the Independent Office for Police Conduct, Great Britain

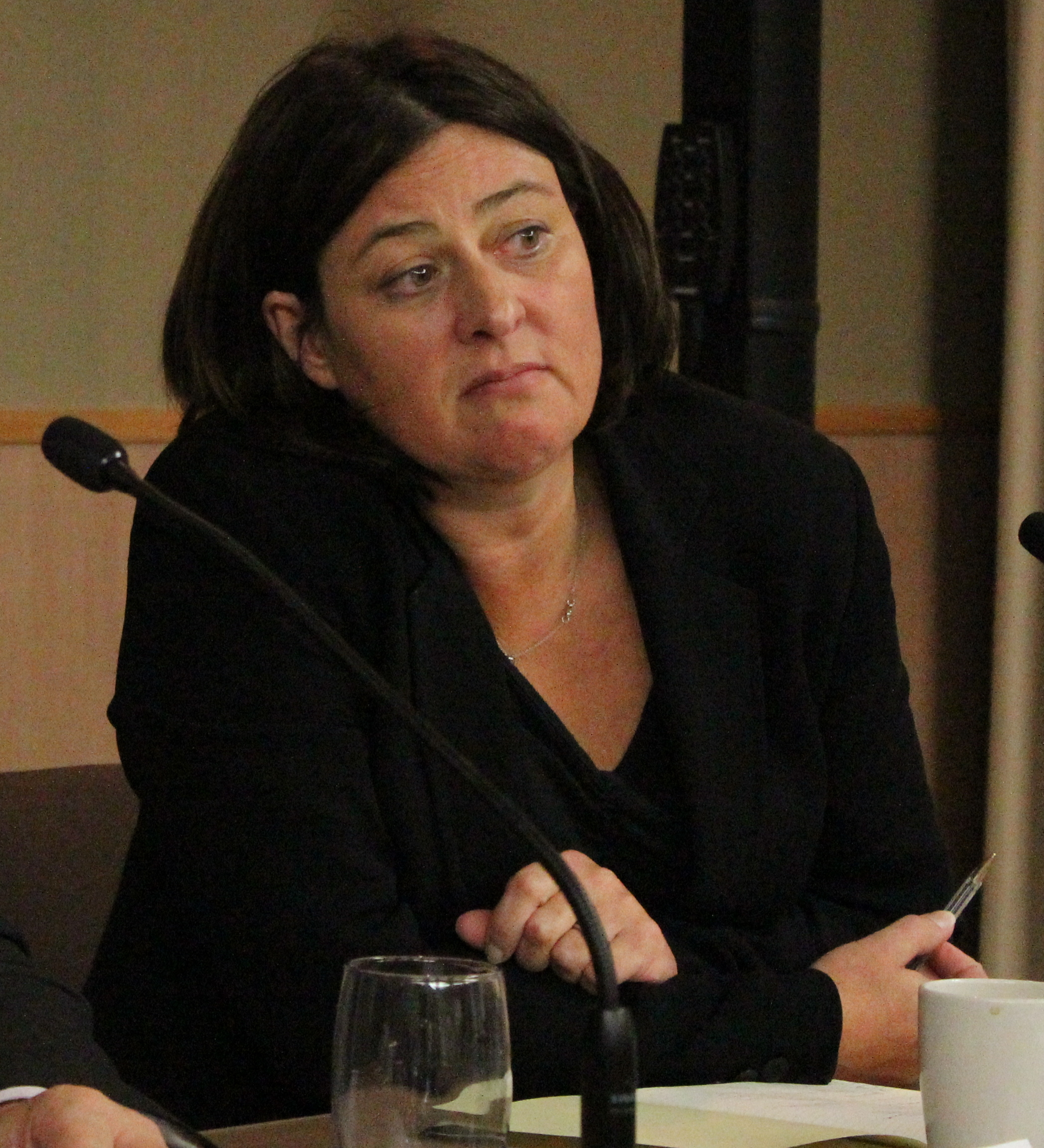
- Mulligan speaking at a Policy Exchange meeting in 2013

Chair of the Gangmasters and Labour Abuse Authority
- Incumbent
- Assumed office 18 November 2021
- Preceded by: Margaret Beels

North Yorkshire Police and Crime Commissioner
- In office 22 November 2012 – 12 May 2021
- Preceded by: Office created
- Succeeded by: Philip Allott

Personal details
- Born: June 1967 (age 59) Bradford
- Party: Conservative

Julia Rosemary Mulligan (born June 1967) is a British Conservative politician who was the first North Yorkshire Police and Crime Commissioner, elected on 15 November 2012. Mulligan stood as the official Conservative Party PCC candidate and previously served as a local district councillor, in Craven, where she lives. She also stood for parliament in the 2010 general election.

Mulligan was elected North Yorkshire's Police and Crime Commissioner in November 2012, and was re-elected in May 2016. On 15 November 2018 she became the North Yorkshire Police, Fire & Crime Commissioner, taking over the governance of North Yorkshire Fire and Rescue Service. In May 2021, Mulligan was replaced by Philip Allott in this role, and she took a job at the Independent Office for Police Conduct.

== Role ==
As a Police and Crime Commissioner, Ms Mulligan is responsible for the "efficient and effective policing" of North Yorkshire. The role of the PCCs is to voice concerns and hold the police to account. They are responsible for the totality of policing. PCCs aim to cut crime and deliver an effective and efficient police service within their force area. PCCs have been elected by the public to hold Chief Constables and the force to account, effectively making the police answerable to the communities they serve. PCCs ensure community needs are met as effectively as possible, and are improving local relationships through building confidence and restoring trust. They work in partnership across a range of agencies at local and national level to ensure there is a unified approach to preventing and reducing crime.

In July 2018, Mulligan announced Lisa Winward as the Police and Crime Commissioner's preferred candidate to become North Yorkshire Police's substantive Chief Constable, and on 15 August 2018 she was confirmed in post by the Police and Crime Panel, becoming the permanent Chief Constable of North Yorkshire Police. In April 2013, Mulligan appointed Dave Jones as the new Chief Constable for North Yorkshire.

== Fire Commissioner ==
In November 2018, responsibility for governance and oversight of North Yorkshire Fire and Rescue Service transferred to Mulligan as the elected North Yorkshire Police, Fire & Crime Commissioner. After a successful campaign, Mulligan became the police and fire commissioner for North Yorkshire in the autumn of 2018. The joint plan had been opposed by North Yorkshire County Council and York City Council, but it was approved by Sajid Javid, the Home Secretary, in June 2018. In January 2019, Police, Fire and Crime Commissioner Mulligan named her preferred candidate for the role of interim Chief Fire Officer for North Yorkshire Fire and Rescue Service. Following an intense day-long interview process, Andrew Brodie will now be put forward to the Police, Fire and Crime Panel for their confirmation.

In 2019, Mulligan failed to be selected by a panel as the next Tory candidate for the Police, Crime and Fire Commissioner for North Yorkshire. The selection process was delayed by a year due to the COVID-19 pandemic, and her successor, Philip Allott was announced on 7 May 2021, with him assuming the role on 13 May 2021. From 12 May 2021, Mulligan became an independent director in the Independent Office for Police Conduct. Since November 2021, Mulligan has been serving as the Chair of the Gangmasters and Labour Abuse Authority. In February 2025, she was reappointed to that role until November 2026.

== Salary ==
The Salaries of the majority of the PCCs are between £70,000 and £85,000, although the commissioners overseeing the three major forces of Greater Manchester, West Yorkshire and West Midlands each receive £100,000. Mulligan is paid £74,400, a salary which was set by the Senior Salaries Review Body.

== Political career ==
In 2006 Mulligan was elected as the ward councillor for Upper Wharfedale in Craven District where she lives. During her time as a local councillor she was a member of the Planning Committee and Policy Committee. In May 2010 Mulligan stood as the Conservative candidate for the marginal parliamentary seat of Leeds North West, losing to the incumbent Lib Dem MP Greg Mulholland.

Civic offices
Preceded by New office created	Police, Fire and Crime Commissioner for North Yorkshire; 2012–2021	Succeeded by Philip Allott
