= Ron Hogg =

British politician and police officer (1951–2019)

Ron Hogg CBE

Durham Police and Crime Commissioner
- In office 22 November 2012 – 17 December 2019
- Preceded by: Office created
- Succeeded by: Steven White (acting)

Personal details
- Born: 1 October 1951 Bridge of Allan, Stirlingshire, Scotland, UK
- Died: 17 December 2019 (aged 68)
- Party: Labour

Adam Ronald Hogg CBE (1 October 1951 – 17 December 2019) was a British politician and police officer. He was the Durham Police and Crime Commissioner, elected for the Labour Party. He was the first person to hold the post and was elected on 15 November 2012 and re-elected on 6 May 2016.

== Police career ==
Hogg served for over 30 years as a police officer. During the 2002 FIFA World Cup, he led the English police unit fighting football hooliganism in the host countries, Japan and South Korea.

As a chief officer, he served as the Assistant Chief Constable of Durham Constabulary with responsibility for operational matters and then, from 2003, as the Deputy Chief Constable of Cleveland Police. He retired from the police in 2008.

Throughout his career he served in four different forces. He began his service with Northumbria Police, working the East End of Newcastle between 1978 and 1981. He then transferred to Northamptonshire Police, where he served until 1992 and progressed to the rank of Chief Inspector.

Hogg's promotion to Superintendent in 1992 saw him return to Northumbria Police. This spell included working as the Area Commander in Sunderland West, and two years working with the HMIC, inspecting forces such as the MPS and West Midlands.

Promotion to ACC with Durham Constabulary came in 1998, and during this period he led a successful reorganisation of that force.

His career concluded in 2008, when he retired having served five years as Deputy Chief Constable with Cleveland Police.

== Political career ==
As a schoolteacher between 1973 and 1978, Hogg was an active member of the NAS (later NAS/UWT) teachers' union. He served as Branch President for 18 months during this period.

Upon joining the police service he ceased all political activity due to the obvious conflict of interest.

On 15 November 2012, following the 2012 election, he was elected the police and crime commissioner for Durham Constabulary. He was one of 13 Labour Party commissioners elected in the inaugural elections.

In October 2013, he announced his support for state-funded consumption rooms for drug addicts. Citing similar provisions in Denmark, he stated that they would provide a safer and healthier environment for long term drug users. He also suggested that heroin should be provided by the state to addicts, therefore reducing associated crime.

He was posthumously appointed Commander of the Order of the British Empire (CBE) in the 2020 New Year Honours for charitable and political services.

== Personal life ==
Hogg was born in Bridge of Allan, Stirlingshire and lived in Chester le Street up to his death.

He attended Corby Grammar school between 1963–65, and then Kingswood Grammar School, Corby between 1965 and 1970. He was a school teacher at Kingswood School, which became a Comprehensive school in 1969, from about 1973 to 1978.

He studied Politics at the University of York between 1970 and 1973, and captained the 1st XV rugby team in his final year.

He was an avid Heart of Midlothian F.C. and Newcastle United F.C. fan, and enjoyed attending Murrayfield to support the Scotland national rugby union team.

Hogg died on 17 December 2019, aged 68, of motor neurone disease, after a short illness.
