= 2012 England and Wales police and crime commissioner elections =

Local elections in England and Wales

2012 police and crime commissioner elections
- 15 November 2012

41 police and crime commissioners 1 Metro Mayor with PCC powers
- Turnout: 18.3%

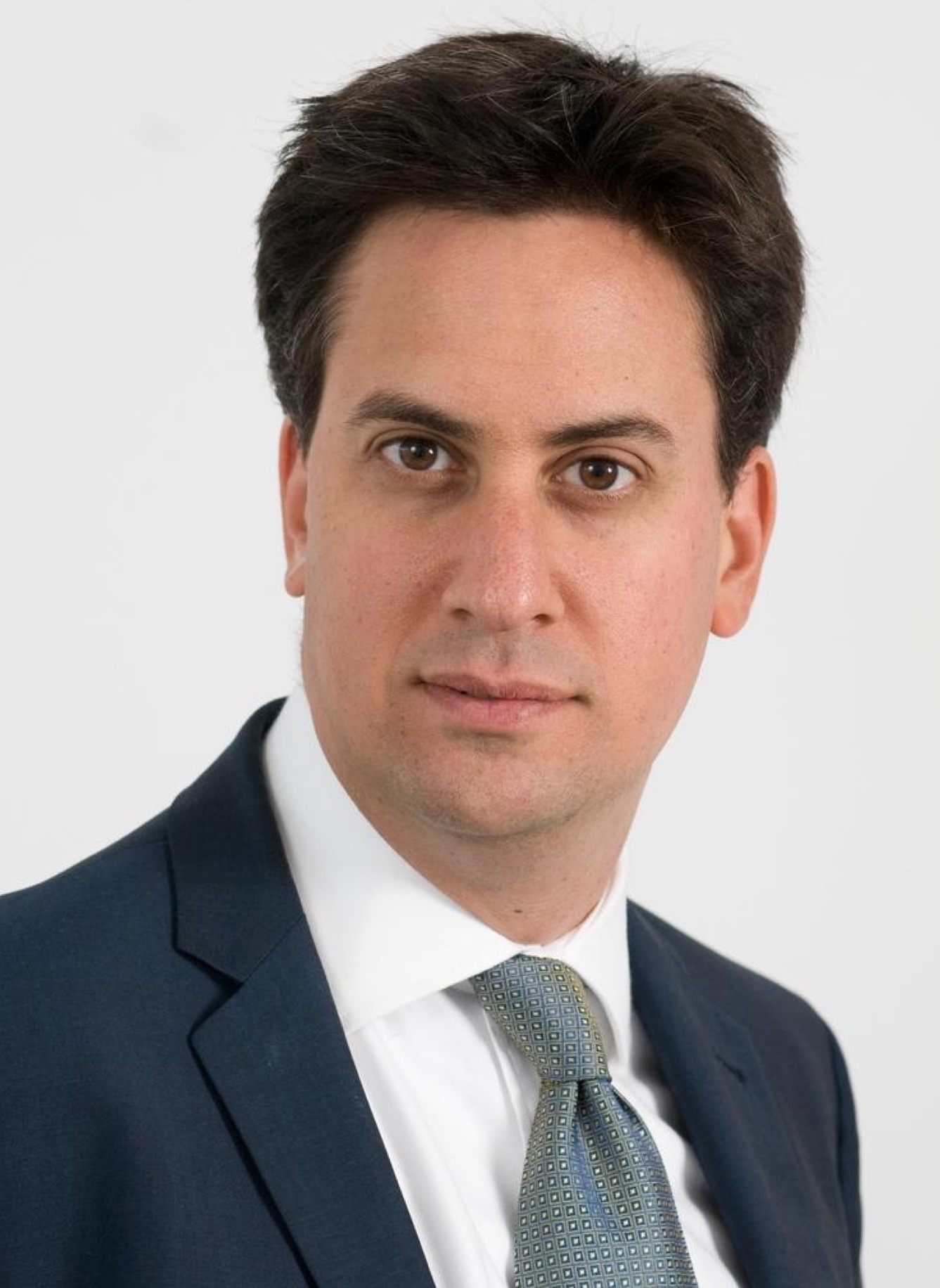
| | First party | Second party |
|---|---|---|
| Leader | David Cameron | Ed Miliband |
| Party | Conservative | Labour |
| Leader since | 6 December 2005 | 25 September 2010 |
| Popular vote | 2,452,254 | 2,605,942 |
| Percentage | 32.5% | 34.6% |
| PCCs | 17 (Note: Includes the Mayor of London.) | 13 |
- The 41 police force areas within England and Wales where elections were held

The 2012 police and crime commissioner elections were polls held in most police areas in England and Wales on Thursday 15 November. The direct election of police and crime commissioners (PCCs) was originally scheduled for May 2012 but was postponed in order to secure the passage of the Police Reform and Social Responsibility Act 2011 through the House of Lords. The government considers the elected commissioners to have a stronger mandate than the "unelected and invisible police authorities that they replace". The elections took place alongside by-elections for the House of Commons in Cardiff South and Penarth, Corby and Manchester Central, and a mayoral election in Bristol.

Police and crime commissioner elections were held in November for 41 of the 43 territorial police forces in England and Wales; the City of London Police and Metropolitan Police are overseen by the Court of Common Council and the elected Mayor of London respectively. Elections for police and crime commissioners did not take place in Scotland or Northern Ireland as policing and justice powers are devolved to the Scottish Parliament and Northern Ireland Assembly.

The elections were marked by very low turnouts, between 10 and 20%, and numbers of spoilt votes (somewhat higher than other elections under the same voting system), sparking a debate about their legitimacy and organisation. The day after the election, former Home Secretary Charles Clarke suggested that, because of the low turnout and high number of spoilt ballot papers, there was no popular mandate for the new commissioners. The Electoral Commission said that it would be reviewing the results.

== Election details ==
Commissioners have a set four-year term of office and a maximum of two terms.

The election used the supplementary vote system: voters marked the ballot paper with their first and second choices of candidate. If no candidate got a majority of first preference votes, the top two candidates went on to a second round in which second preference votes of the eliminated candidates were allocated to them to produce a winner. This is the system used to elect London's mayor. Section 57 of the Police Reform and Social Responsibility Act 2011 directs that the voting system is first past the post if there are only two candidates for a specific commissioner region. (This was the case in the North Yorkshire, Staffordshire and Dyfed-Powys police force areas)

A dedicated website was launched providing information on all candidates from which voters could request hardcopy information leaflets printed to order.

All registered electors (British, Irish, Commonwealth and European Union citizens) living in England and Wales (except London) who were aged 18 or over on Thursday 15 November 2012 were entitled to vote in the PCC elections. Those who were temporarily away from their ordinary address (for example, away working, on holiday, in student accommodation or in hospital) could still vote in the PCC elections. Those who were registered to vote at more than one address (such as a university student who has a term-time address and lives at home during holidays) were entitled to vote in the PCC elections at both addresses, as long as they were not in the same police force area.

The deadline to register to vote in the PCC elections was midnight on Wednesday 31 October 2012, though anyone who qualified as an anonymous elector had until midnight on Thursday 8 November 2012 to register. Nominations for candidates closed at midday on Friday 19 October 2012, and the official list of nominated candidates was published on Tuesday 23 October 2012.

== Electoral Commission ==
On 11 September 2012 the Electoral Commission, the independent elections watchdog in the UK, announced it would run a public awareness campaign from Monday 22 October 2012 until polling day 15 November 2012. A booklet was sent to every household in England and Wales with factual information on the PCC elections. The commission also published a briefing note setting out the steps that needed to be taken to ensure the police and crime commissioner elections were well run. Jenny Watson, chair of the Electoral Commission, said: "While we don't agree with the decisions taken by the Government about how to make people aware of these elections, it's now time to focus on making the arrangements work for voters."

== Party positions ==
Liberal Democrat candidates in England and Wales.

UKIP candidates in England and Wales.

Both Labour and the Conservatives fielded candidates in all 41 elections, while the Liberal Democrats fielded 24 candidates (all in England) and UKIP fielded 23 candidates in England and one in North Wales. The English Democrats fielded five candidates, the Green Party had just one candidate, and the British Freedom Party also had one candidate. Plaid Cymru did not stand any candidates for the four Welsh constabularies. There were 57 other candidates; 54 stood as independents and three stood under other labels (Justice and Anti-Corruption, Campaign to Stop Politicians Running Policing and Zero Tolerance Policing ex Chief).

=== Party funding ===
Candidates standing for election were required to post a £5,000 deposit, which was returned if they received at least 5 per cent of the vote.

The Labour Party initially considered not fielding candidates under party colours in favour of independent candidates, claiming that running candidates would politicise police forces. However the party later changed its position, letting candidates stand as Labour candidates and funding their deposits.

The Conservative Party Central Office did not provide any funding for Conservative candidates, leaving them either to fund deposits out of their own pockets or to be funded by local Conservative associations.

The Liberal Democrats Federal Executive Committee voted against providing funds for regional parties who wished to stand candidates.

== Turnout ==
In August 2012 the Electoral Reform Society predicted that government mishandling of the elections was likely to lead to the lowest election turnout in UK peacetime history.

Turnout was low for the elections across England and Wales: below 20% in most areas — with a total turnout of 15.1%. Lack of information (both on the election itself and from the candidates) and the November timing of the election were cited as reasons for the low turnout. It was also argued that the election should have been held on the same day as local elections.

== Results ==
=== Overall results ===
This table includes the results of the May 2012 election for the Mayor of London, who holds PCC responsibilities.

| Party | Votes won | % votes | Stood | Seats | % seats |
|---|---|---|---|---|---|
| Labour | 2,606,039 | 34.5 | 42 | 13 | 31.0 |
| Conservative | 2,452,261 | 32.5 | 42 | 17 | 40.5 |
| Independent | 1,300,598 | 17.2 | 51 | 11 | 26.2 |
| Liberal Democrats | 475,663 | 6.3 | 25 | 0 | — |
| UKIP | 418,762 | 5.6 | 25 | 0 | — |
| Green | 107,397 | 1.4 | 2 | 0 | — |
| English Democrat | 59,308 | 0.8 | 5 | 0 | — |
| Zero Tolerance Policing | 34,378 | 0.5 | 1 | 1 | 2.4 |
| BNP | 28,751 | 0.4 | 1 | 0 | — |
| Stop Politicians Running Policing | 27,345 | 0.4 | 1 | 0 | — |
| JAC | 24,443 | 0.3 | 1 | 0 | — |
| British Freedom | 8,675 | 0.1 | 1 | 0 | — |

Turnout: 18.3%

=== England ===
==== Avon and Somerset Constabulary ====
- Bob Ashford was the original Labour candidate, but stood down on 8 August due to a conviction for possession of an offensive weapon, received when aged 13, and was replaced by Dr John Savage, a businessman who chairs a local NHS hospital trust.
- Cllr Pete Levy was the Liberal Democrat candidate.
- Cllr Ken Maddock, former leader of Somerset County Council, was the Conservative candidate.
- Sue Mountstevens, a Bristol magistrate, was an independent candidate.
- Ian Kealey was selected as the UKIP candidate, but withdrew.

Avon and Somerset Police and Crime Commissioner election, 2012
| Party | Candidate | 1st round | | 2nd round | | | 1st round votesTransfer votes, 2nd round |
| Party | Candidate | Total | Of round | Transfers | Total | Of round | 1st round votesTransfer votes, 2nd round |
|---|---|---|---|---|---|---|---|
| Independent | Sue Mountstevens | 83,985 | 35.8% | 41,719 | 125,704 | 64.9% | |
| Conservative | Ken Maddock | 57,094 | 24.4% | 10,748 | 67,842 | 35.1% | |
| Labour | John Savage | 49,989 | 21.3% | | | | |
| Liberal Democrats | Pete Levy | 43,446 | 18.5% | | | | |
| Turnout | | 234,514 | 18.8% | | | | |
| Rejected ballots | | 9,190 | 3.8% | | | | |
| Total votes | | 243,704 | 19.56% | | | | |
| Registered electors | | 1,246,031 | | | | | |
| Independent win | | | | | | | |

==== Bedfordshire Police ====
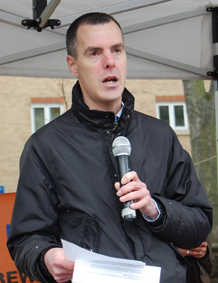
Olly Martins

- Kevin Carroll stood for the British Freedom Party.
- Linda Jack, a teacher, stood for the Liberal Democrats.
- Olly Martins was the Labour and Co-operative candidate.
- Jas Parmar, a former police officer, was the Conservative candidate.
- Mezanur Rashid, a community worker, was an independent candidate.

Bedfordshire Police and Crime Commissioner election, 2012
| Party | Candidate | 1st round | | 2nd round | | | 1st round votesTransfer votes, 2nd round |
| Party | Candidate | Total | Of round | Transfers | Total | Of round | 1st round votesTransfer votes, 2nd round |
|---|---|---|---|---|---|---|---|
| Labour Co-op | Olly Martins | 27,947 | 34.0% | 8,011 | 35,958 | 52.8% | |
| Conservative | Jas Parmar | 26,226 | 31.9% | 5,874 | 32,100 | 47.2% | |
| Liberal Democrats | Linda Jack | 11,205 | 13.6% | | | | |
| British Freedom | Kevin Carroll | 8,675 | 10.6% | | | | |
| Independent | Mezanur Rashid | 8,076 | 9.8% | | | | |
| Turnout | | 82,129 | 17.8% | | | | |
| Rejected ballots | | 2,041 | 2.4% | | | | |
| Total votes | | 84,170 | 18.2 | | | | |
| Registered electors | | 462,823 | | | | | |
| Labour Co-op win | | | | | | | |

==== Cambridgeshire Constabulary ====
- Ansar Ali, a member of the Police Authority, stood as an independent candidate.
- Graham Bright, former Conservative MP for Luton South, was the Conservative candidate, replacing former RAF officer Air commodore John Pye, who was initially selected as the Conservative candidate but later stood down.
- Paul Bullen, a magistrate, was the UKIP candidate.
- Stephen Goldspink, former Peterborough councillor, stood for the English Democrats.
- Farooq Mohammed stood as an independent candidate.
- Rupert Moss-Eccardt, former Cambridge councillor, stood for the Liberal Democrats.
- Cllr Ed Murphy was the Labour candidate.

Cambridgeshire Police and Crime Commissioner election, 2012
| Party | Candidate | 1st round | | 2nd round | | | 1st round votesTransfer votes, 2nd round |
| Party | Candidate | Total | Of round | Transfers | Total | Of round | 1st round votesTransfer votes, 2nd round |
|---|---|---|---|---|---|---|---|
| Conservative | Graham Bright | 23,731 | 26.8% | 7,909 | 31,640 | 55.7% | |
| Labour | Ed Murphy | 17,576 | 19.8% | 7,538 | 25,114 | 44.3% | |
| UKIP | Paul Bullen | 14,504 | 16.4% | | | | |
| Independent | Ansar Ali | 12,706 | 14.3% | | | | |
| Liberal Democrats | Rupert Moss-Eccardt | 7,530 | 8.5% | | | | |
| English Democrat | Stephen Goldspink | 7,219 | 8.2% | | | | |
| Independent | Farooq Mohammed | 5,337 | 6.0% | | | | |
| Turnout | | 88,603 | 14.8% | | | | |
| Rejected ballots | | 2,892 | 3.2% | | | | |
| Total votes | | 91,495 | 15.3 | | | | |
| Registered electors | | 599,894 | | | | | |
| Conservative win | | | | | | | |

==== Cheshire Constabulary ====
- Ainsley Arnold, Vice Chairman of Cheshire Police Authority, was the Liberal Democrat candidate.
- Louise Bours, a former councillor and Mayor of Congleton, was the UKIP candidate.
- John Dwyer, former assistant chief constable of Cheshire, was the Conservative candidate.
- Sarah Flannery, a businesswoman, stood as an independent.
- Cllr John Stockton was the Labour candidate.

Cheshire Police and Crime Commissioner election, 2012
| Party | Candidate | 1st round | | 2nd round | | | 1st round votesTransfer votes, 2nd round |
| Party | Candidate | Total | Of round | Transfers | Total | Of round | 1st round votesTransfer votes, 2nd round |
|---|---|---|---|---|---|---|---|
| Conservative | John Dwyer | 40,122 | 36.8% | 8,469 | 48,591 | 56.5% | |
| Labour | John Stockton | 30,974 | 28.4% | 6,376 | 37,350 | 43.5% | |
| Independent | Sarah Flannery | 18,596 | 17.1% | | | | |
| Liberal Democrats | Ainsley Arnold | 10,653 | 9.8% | | | | |
| UKIP | Louise Bours | 8,557 | 7.9% | | | | |
| Turnout | | 108,902 | 13.7% | | | | |
| Rejected ballots | | 2,415 | 2.2% | | | | |
| Total votes | | 111,317 | 14.0 | | | | |
| Registered electors | | 792,852 | | | | | |
| Conservative win | | | | | | | |

==== Cleveland Police ====
- Sultan Allam was an independent.
- Cllr Barry Coppinger was the Labour candidate.
- Cllr Ken Lupton was the Conservative candidate.
- Cllr Joe Michna was the Green Party candidate.

Cleveland Police and Crime Commissioner election, 2012
| Party | Candidate | 1st round | | 2nd round | | | 1st round votesTransfer votes, 2nd round |
| Party | Candidate | Total | Of round | Transfers | Total | Of round | 1st round votesTransfer votes, 2nd round |
|---|---|---|---|---|---|---|---|
| Labour | Barry Coppinger | 25,691 | 41.6% | 5,649 | 31,340 | 60.8% | |
| Conservative | Ken Lupton | 16,047 | 26.0% | 4,124 | 20,171 | 39.2% | |
| Independent | Sultan Alam | 11,561 | 18.7% | | | | |
| Green | Joe Michna | 8,484 | 13.7% | | | | |
| Turnout | | 61,783 | 14.7% | | | | |
| Rejected ballots | | | | | | | |
| Total votes | | | | | | | |
| Registered electors | | 419,397 | | | | | |
| Labour win | | | | | | | |

==== Cumbria Constabulary ====
- Cllr Pru Jupe was the Liberal Democrat candidate.
- Patrick Leonard was the Labour candidate.
- Richard Rhodes, a magistrate and former headmaster, was the Conservative candidate.
- Cllr Mary Robinson stood as an independent candidate.

Cumbria Police and Crime Commissioner election, 2012
| Party | Candidate | 1st round | | 2nd round | | | 1st round votesTransfer votes, 2nd round |
| Party | Candidate | Total | Of round | Transfers | Total | Of round | 1st round votesTransfer votes, 2nd round |
|---|---|---|---|---|---|---|---|
| Conservative | Richard Rhodes | 18,080 | 29.0% | 7,328 | 25,408 | 55.6% | |
| Labour | Patrick Leonard | 15,301 | 24.6% | 5,016 | 20,317 | 44.4% | |
| Independent | Mary Robinson | 15,245 | 24.5% | | | | |
| Liberal Democrats | Pru Jupe | 13,625 | 21.9% | | | | |
| Turnout | | 62,249 | 15.9% | | | | |
| Rejected ballots | | 2,014 | 3.1% | | | | |
| Total votes | | 64,263 | 16.4 | | | | |
| Registered electors | | 392,285 | | | | | |
| Conservative win | | | | | | | |

==== Derbyshire Constabulary ====
- Alan Charles, Police Authority Deputy, was the Labour candidate.
- David Gale, a businessman, was the UKIP candidate.
- Rod Hutton, a former Police Officer, stood as an independent.
- Cllr Simon Spencer, Deputy Leader of Derbyshire County Council, was the Conservative candidate.

Derbyshire Police and Crime Commissioner election, 2012
| Party | Candidate | 1st round | | 2nd round | | | 1st round votesTransfer votes, 2nd round |
| Party | Candidate | Total | Of round | Transfers | Total | Of round | 1st round votesTransfer votes, 2nd round |
|---|---|---|---|---|---|---|---|
| Labour | Alan Charles | 50,028 | 44.3% | 7,220 | 57,248 | 61.1% | |
| Conservative | Simon Spencer | 27,690 | 24.5% | 8,779 | 36,469 | 38.9% | |
| UKIP | David Gale | 18,097 | 16.0% | | | | |
| Independent | Rod Hutton | 17,093 | 15.1% | | | | |
| Turnout | | 112,908 | 14.4% | | | | |
| Rejected ballots | | 3,049 | 2.6% | | | | |
| Total votes | | 115,957 | 14.7 | | | | |
| Registered electors | | 786,417 | | | | | |
| Labour win | | | | | | | |

==== Devon and Cornwall Police ====
- Brian Blake, a former Devon and Cornwall Constabulary and Ministry of Defence police officer with three decades service with Devon and Cornwall Police and thirteen years service with the Ministry of Defence Police, stood for the Liberal Democrats.
- Brian Greenslade, former chairman of Devon & Cornwall Police Authority, former Liberal Democrat chairman of Devon County Council and resources chair and board member APA, stood as an independent.
- Commodore Tony Hogg, commanding officer of RNAS Culdrose, was the Conservative candidate.
- Ivan Jordan RIBA, chartered architect and farmer, stood as an independent
- William Morris, secretary general of the Next Century Foundation (NFC) and chairman of the International Council for Press and Broadcasting, stood as an independent candidate.
- John Smith, a former chairman of Devon & Cornwall Police Authority and former Liberal Democrat Devon County councillor, stood as an independent.
- Nicky Williams was the Labour candidate.

Devon and Cornwall Police and Crime Commissioner election, 2012
| Party | Candidate | 1st round | | 2nd round | | | 1st round votesTransfer votes, 2nd round |
| Party | Candidate | Total | Of round | Transfers | Total | Of round | 1st round votesTransfer votes, 2nd round |
|---|---|---|---|---|---|---|---|
| Conservative | Tony Hogg | 55,257 | 29.0% | 14,162 | 69,419 | 65.1% | |
| Independent | Brian Greenslade | 24,719 | 13.0% | 12,524 | 37,243 | 34.9% | |
| Labour | Nicky Williams | 24,196 | 12.7% | | | | |
| Liberal Democrats | Brian Blake | 23,948 | 12.6% | | | | |
| UKIP | Robert Smith | 16,433 | 8.6% | | | | |
| Independent | Ivan Jordan | 12,382 | 6.5% | | | | |
| Independent | William Morris | 10,586 | 5.6% | | | | |
| Independent | John Smith | 10,171 | 5.3% | | | | |
| Independent | Graham Calderwood | 8,667 | 4.6% | | | | |
| Independent | Tam Macpherson | 4,306 | 2.3% | | | | |
| Turnout | | 190,665 | 14.7% | | | | |
| Rejected ballots | | 6,339 | 3.2% | | | | |
| Total votes | | 197,004 | 15.1 | | | | |
| Registered electors | | 1,300,925 | | | | | |
| Conservative win | | | | | | | |

==== Dorset Police ====
- Cllr Andy Canning was the Liberal Democrat candidate.
- Cllr Nick King was the Conservative candidate.
- Rachael Rogers was the Labour candidate.
- Retired Detective Chief Inspector Martyn Underhill stood as an independent

Dorset Police and Crime Commissioner election, 2012
| Party | Candidate | 1st round | | 2nd round | | | 1st round votesTransfer votes, 2nd round |
| Party | Candidate | Total | Of round | Transfers | Total | Of round | 1st round votesTransfer votes, 2nd round |
|---|---|---|---|---|---|---|---|
| Independent | Martyn Underhill | 43,425 | 45.2% | 8,505 | 51,930 | 60.1% | |
| Conservative | Nick King | 31,165 | 32.4% | 3,286 | 34,451 | 39.9% | |
| Labour | Rachel Rogers | 11,596 | 12.1% | | | | |
| Liberal Democrats | Andy Canning | 9,963 | 10.4% | | | | |
| Turnout | | 96,149 | 16.3% | | | | |
| Rejected ballots | | 2,527 | 2.6% | | | | |
| Total votes | | 98,676 | 16.8 | | | | |
| Registered electors | | 588,458 | | | | | |
| Independent win | | | | | | | |

==== Durham Constabulary ====
- Michael Costello was the UKIP candidate. He had formerly worked with the Durham force on IT projects.
- Ron Hogg, former Deputy Chief Constable of Cleveland, was the Labour candidate.
- Kingsley Smith, former Chief Executive of Durham County Council, stood as an independent candidate.
- Nick Varley was the Conservative candidate.

Durham Police and Crime Commissioner election, 2012
| Party | Candidate | 1st round | | 2nd round | | | 1st round votesTransfer votes, 2nd round |
| Party | Candidate | Total | Of round | Transfers | Total | Of round | 1st round votesTransfer votes, 2nd round |
|---|---|---|---|---|---|---|---|
| Labour | Ron Hogg | 36,171 | 51.6% | | | | |
| Independent | Kingsley Smith | 18,813 | 26.8% | | | | |
| UKIP | Michael Costello | 8,257 | 11.8% | | | | |
| Conservative | Nick Varley | 6,900 | 9.8% | | | | |
| Turnout | | 70,141 | 14.4% | | | | |
| Rejected ballots | | 1,445 | 2.0% | | | | |
| Total votes | | 71,586 | 14.7 | | | | |
| Registered electors | | 486,264 | | | | | |
| Labour win | | | | | | | |

==== Essex Police ====
- Nick Alston, a retired naval officer and director in the Civil Service, was the Conservative candidate.
- Linda Belgrove, former Vice Chair of Essex Police Authority, was an independent candidate.
- Val Morris Cook, deputy leader of Thurrock Council, was the Labour candidate.
- Andrew Smith, a businessman, was the UKIP candidate.
- Mick Thwaites, a former chief superintendent, stood as an independent.
- Robin Tilbrook, National Chairman of the English Democrats, stood as the English Democrats' candidate.

Essex Police and Crime Commissioner election, 2012
| Party | Candidate | 1st round | | 2nd round | | | 1st round votesTransfer votes, 2nd round |
| Party | Candidate | Total | Of round | Transfers | Total | Of round | 1st round votesTransfer votes, 2nd round |
|---|---|---|---|---|---|---|---|
| Conservative | Nick Alston | 51,325 | 30.5% | 11,025 | 62,350 | 51.5% | |
| Independent | Mick Thwaites | 40,132 | 23.9% | 18,532 | 58,664 | 48.5% | |
| Labour | Val Morris-Cook | 27,926 | 16.6% | | | | |
| Independent | Linda Belgrove | 22,163 | 13.2% | | | | |
| UKIP | Andrew Smith | 15,138 | 9.0% | | | | |
| English Democrat | Robin Tilbrook | 11,550 | 6.9% | | | | |
| Turnout | | 168,234 | 12.8% | | | | |
| Rejected ballots | | 3,452 | 2.0% | | | | |
| Total votes | | 171,686 | 13.1 | | | | |
| Registered electors | | 1,313,745 | | | | | |
| Conservative win | | | | | | | |

==== Gloucestershire Constabulary ====
- Victoria Atkins, a lawyer, was the Conservative candidate.
- Alistair Cameron, former leader of Cheltenham Borough Council, was the Liberal Democrat candidate.
- Rupi Dhanda, a lawyer, was the Labour candidate.
- Retired Superintendent Martin Surl stood as an independent

Gloucestershire Police and Crime Commissioner election, 2012
| Party | Candidate | 1st round | | 2nd round | | | 1st round votesTransfer votes, 2nd round |
| Party | Candidate | Total | Of round | Transfers | Total | Of round | 1st round votesTransfer votes, 2nd round |
|---|---|---|---|---|---|---|---|
| Independent | Martin Surl | 27,676 | 35.3% | 8,910 | 36,586 | 53.1% | |
| Conservative | Victoria Atkins | 28,422 | 36.2% | 3,917 | 32,339 | 46.9% | |
| Labour | Rupi Dhanda | 13,741 | 17.5% | | | | |
| Liberal Democrats | Alistair Cameron | 8,663 | 11.0% | | | | |
| Turnout | | 78,502 | 16.0% | | | | |
| Rejected ballots | | 2,115 | 2.6% | | | | |
| Total votes | | 80,617 | 16.0 | | | | |
| Registered electors | | 491,776 | | | | | |
| Independent win | | | | | | | |

==== Greater Manchester Police ====
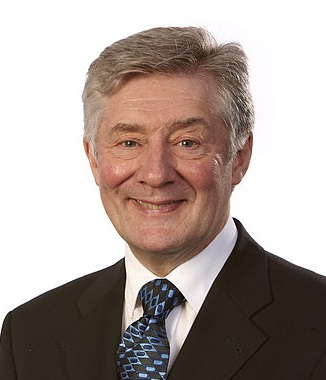
Tony Lloyd

- Matt Gallagher, a former police officer, was the Liberal Democrat candidate.
- Tony Lloyd, Labour MP for Manchester Central until he resigned to fight this election, was the Labour candidate.
- Roy Warren, a magistrate, stood as an independent candidate.
- Michael Winstanley was the Conservative candidate.
- Steven Woolfe, a lawyer, was the UKIP candidate.

Greater Manchester Police and Crime Commissioner election, 2012
| Party | Candidate | 1st round | | 2nd round | | | 1st round votesTransfer votes, 2nd round |
| Party | Candidate | Total | Of round | Transfers | Total | Of round | 1st round votesTransfer votes, 2nd round |
|---|---|---|---|---|---|---|---|
| Labour | Tony Lloyd | 139,437 | 51.2% | | | | |
| Conservative | Michael Winstanley | 42,478 | 15.6% | | | | |
| Liberal Democrats | Matt Gallagher | 40,318 | 14.8% | | | | |
| Independent | Roy Warren | 26,664 | 9.8% | | | | |
| UKIP | Steven Woolfe | 23,256 | 8.6% | | | | |
| Turnout | | 272,153 | 13.59% | | | | |
| Rejected ballots | | 6,823 | 2.5% | | | | |
| Total votes | | 278,976 | 13.9 | | | | |
| Registered electors | | 2,002,309 | | | | | |
| Labour win | | | | | | | |

==== Hampshire Constabulary ====
- Cllr David Goodall, an Eastleigh Borough councillor, was the Liberal Democrat candidate.
- Simon Hayes was an independent. He is chairman of Hampshire and Isle of Wight Crimestoppers, Conservative Councillor and former chair of Hampshire Police Authority.
- Michael Mates, former Conservative MP for East Hampshire, was the Conservative candidate.
- Cllr Jacqui Rayment was the Labour candidate.
- Cllr Stephen West, after departing from the Conservative Party, was the UKIP candidate.

Hampshire Police and Crime Commissioner election, 2012
| Party | Candidate | 1st round | | 2nd round | | | 1st round votesTransfer votes, 2nd round |
| Party | Candidate | Total | Of round | Transfers | Total | Of round | 1st round votesTransfer votes, 2nd round |
|---|---|---|---|---|---|---|---|
| Independent | Simon Hayes | 47,632 | 22.48% | 33,037 | 80,669 | 55.1% | |
| Conservative | Michael Mates | 52,616 | 24.83% | 13,188 | 65,804 | 44.9% | |
| Labour | Jacqui Rayment | 38,813 | 18.32% | | | | |
| Liberal Democrats | David Goodall | 27,197 | 12.84% | | | | |
| Justice & Anti-Corruption | Don Jerrard | 24,443 | 11.53% | | | | |
| UKIP | Stephen West | 21,185 | 10.00% | | | | |
| Turnout | | 211,886 | 14.63% | | | | |
| Rejected ballots | | 5,595 | 2.57% | | | | |
| Total votes | | 217,481 | 15.02 | | | | |
| Registered electors | | 1,448,374 | | | | | |
| Independent win | | | | | | | |

==== Hertfordshire Constabulary ====
- Cllr Sherma Batson was the Labour candidate.
- Cllr David Lloyd was the Conservative candidate.
- Marion Mason, a former councillor, was the UKIP candidate.
- Cllr Christopher Townsend was the Liberal Democrat candidate.

Hertfordshire Police and Crime Commissioner election, 2012
| Party | Candidate | 1st round | | 2nd round | | | 1st round votesTransfer votes, 2nd round |
| Party | Candidate | Total | Of round | Transfers | Total | Of round | 1st round votesTransfer votes, 2nd round |
|---|---|---|---|---|---|---|---|
| Conservative | David Lloyd | 54,686 | 45.89% | 10,899 | 65,585 | 60.5% | |
| Labour | Sherma Batson | 34,528 | 28.98% | 8,302 | 42,830 | 39.5% | |
| Liberal Democrats | Christopher Townsend | 16,790 | 14.09% | | | | |
| UKIP | Marion Mason | 13,154 | 11.04% | | | | |
| Turnout | | 119,158 | 14.10% | | | | |
| Rejected ballots | | 3,797 | 3.09% | | | | |
| Total votes | | 122,955 | 14.55 | | | | |
| Registered electors | | 845,253 | | | | | |
| Conservative win | | | | | | | |

==== Humberside Police ====
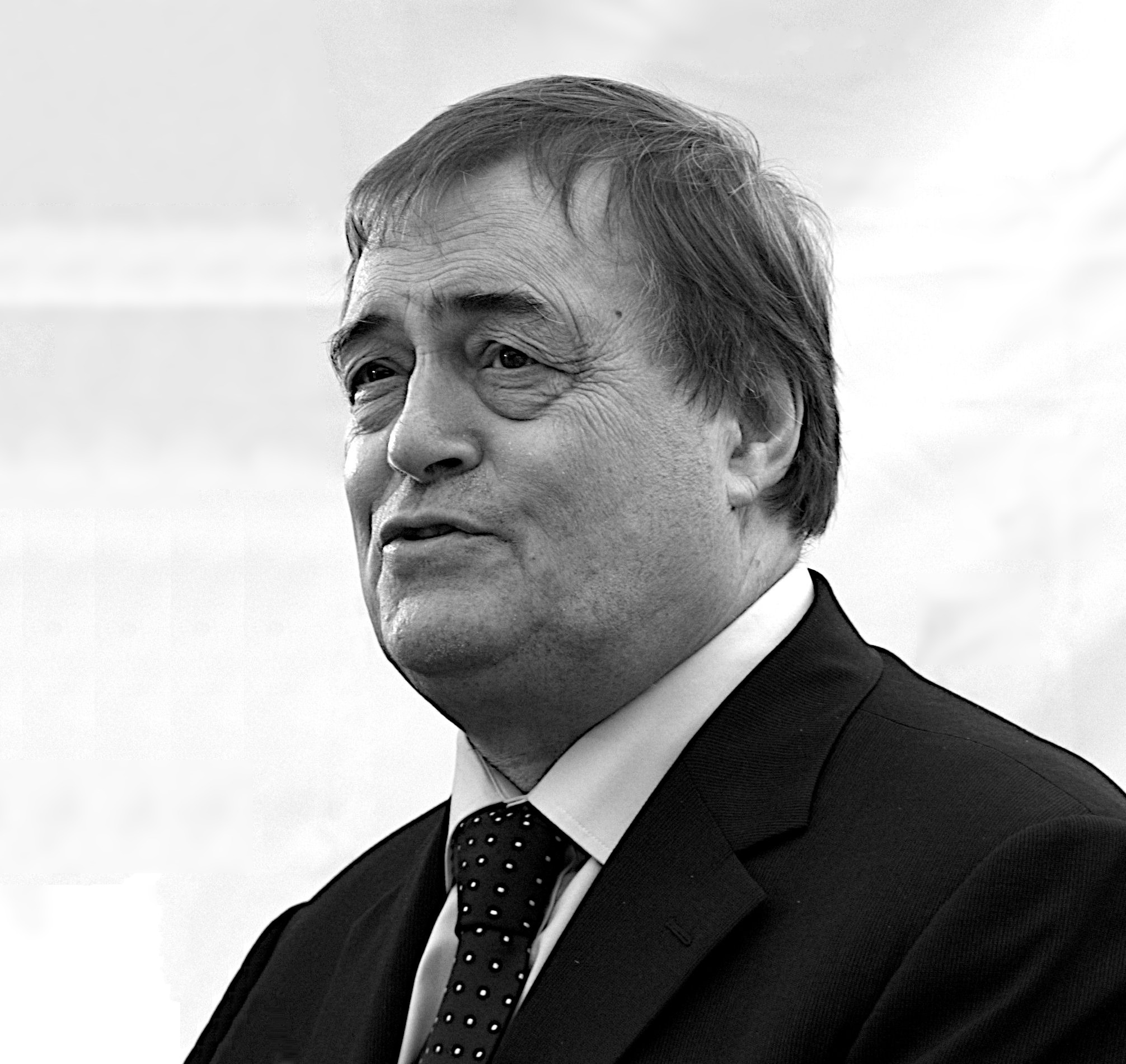
John Prescott in June 2007

- Godfrey Bloom, UKIP MEP for Yorkshire and the Humber, was the UKIP candidate, while his running mate was Mike Speakman, the former Humberside Police Deputy Chief Constable.
- Cllr Simone Butterworth, former leader of Hull City Council, was the Liberal Democrat candidate.
- Paul Davison, a former chief superintendent, stood as an independent.
- Cllr Matthew Grove was the Conservative candidate.
- John Prescott, former deputy prime minister of the United Kingdom, was the Labour candidate having defeated Ian Cawsey, former MP for Brigg and Goole in the nomination process.
- Walter Sweeney, former Conservative MP for Vale of Glamorgan, ran as an independent.
- Neil Eyre also stood as an independent.

Humberside Police and Crime Commissioner election, 2012
| Party | Candidate | 1st round | | 2nd round | | | 1st round votesTransfer votes, 2nd round |
| Party | Candidate | Total | Of round | Transfers | Total | Of round | 1st round votesTransfer votes, 2nd round |
|---|---|---|---|---|---|---|---|
| Conservative | Matthew Grove | 29,440 | 22.01% | 12,724 | 42,164 | 51.4% | |
| Labour | John Prescott | 33,282 | 24.88% | 6,651 | 39,933 | 48.6% | |
| Independent | Paul Davison | 28,807 | 21.54% | | | | |
| UKIP | Godfrey Bloom | 21,484 | 16.06% | | | | |
| Liberal Democrats | Simone Butterworth | 11,655 | 8.71% | | | | |
| Independent | Walter Sweeney | 5,118 | 3.83% | | | | |
| Independent | Neil Eyre | 3,976 | 2.97% | | | | |
| Turnout | | 133,762 | 19.15% | | | | |
| Rejected ballots | | 2,303 | 1.69% | | | | |
| Total votes | | 136,065 | 19.48 | | | | |
| Registered electors | | 698,556 | | | | | |
| Conservative win | | | | | | | |

==== Kent Police ====
- Ann Barnes, magistrate and former chair of Kent Police Authority, stood as an independent.
- Dayantha Liyanage, former Liberal Democrat mayor of Medway, stood as an independent.
- Cllr Craig Mackinlay, chartered accountant/tax adviser, Conservative councillor on Medway Council and former UKIP acting leader, was the Conservative candidate having defeated Francois Gordon, former Ambassador to Ivory Coast and Jan Berry, former Chairwoman of the Police Federation of England and Wales in the nomination process.
- Steven Uncles, NHS IT and facilities manager, was the English Democrats candidate.
- Cllr Piers Wauchope, criminal barrister and UKIP councillor on Tunbridge Wells Borough Council, was the UKIP candidate.
- Cllr Harriet Yeo, president of the TSSA, chair of the NEC and leader of the Labour Group on Ashford Borough Council, was the Labour candidate.

Kent Police and Crime Commissioner election, 2012
| Party | Candidate | 1st round | | 2nd round | | | 1st round votesTransfer votes, 2nd round |
| Party | Candidate | Total | Of round | Transfers | Total | Of round | 1st round votesTransfer votes, 2nd round |
|---|---|---|---|---|---|---|---|
| Independent | Ann Barnes | 95,901 | 46.80% | 18,236 | 114,137 | 65.5% | |
| Conservative | Craig Mackinlay | 51,671 | 25.22% | 8,577 | 60,248 | 34.5% | |
| Labour | Harriet Yeo | 23,005 | 11.23% | | | | |
| UKIP | Piers Wauchope | 15,885 | 7.75% | | | | |
| English Democrat | Steven Uncles | 10,789 | 5.27% | | | | |
| Independent | Dayantha Liyanage | 7,666 | 3.74% | | | | |
| Turnout | | 204,917 | 15.98% | | | | |
| Rejected ballots | | 3,931 | 1.88% | | | | |
| Total votes | | 208,848 | 16.29 | | | | |
| Registered electors | | 1,281,968 | | | | | |
| Independent win | | | | | | | |

==== Lancashire Constabulary ====
- Afzal Anwar, a barrister, was the Liberal Democrat candidate.
- Cllr Tim Ashton, of Lancashire County Council was the Conservative candidate.
- Cllr Robert Drobny, former Deputy Mayor of Preesall, was the UKIP candidate.
- Cllr Clive Grunshaw, former chair of resources for the Lancashire Police Authority, was the Labour candidate.

Lancashire Police and Crime Commissioner election, 2012
| Party | Candidate | 1st round | | 2nd round | | | 1st round votesTransfer votes, 2nd round |
| Party | Candidate | Total | Of round | Transfers | Total | Of round | 1st round votesTransfer votes, 2nd round |
|---|---|---|---|---|---|---|---|
| Labour | Clive Grunshaw | 66,017 | 39.28% | 13,773 | 79,790 | 52.1% | |
| Conservative | Tim Ashton | 58,428 | 34.76% | 14,834 | 73,262 | 47.9% | |
| UKIP | Robert Drobny | 25,228 | 15.01% | | | | |
| Liberal Democrats | Afzal Anwar | 18,396 | 10.95% | | | | |
| Turnout | | 168,069 | 15.05% | | | | |
| Rejected ballots | | 4,643 | 2.69% | | | | |
| Total votes | | 172,712 | 15.47 | | | | |
| Registered electors | | 1,116,623 | | | | | |
| Labour win | | | | | | | |

==== Leicestershire Constabulary ====
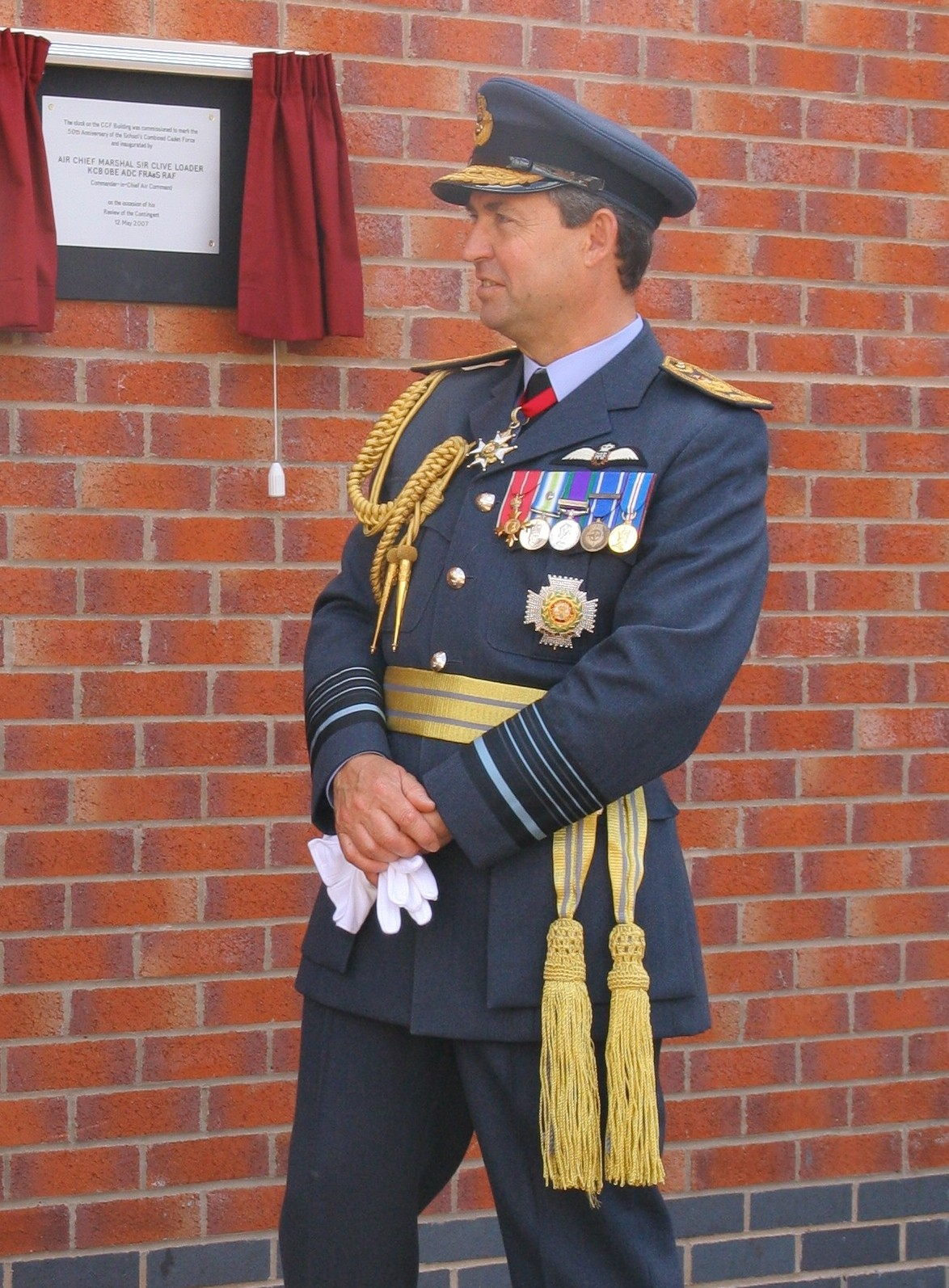
Clive Loader

- Air Chief Marshal Sir Clive Loader, a parish councillor who was until 2009 the Commander-in-Chief of the RAF Air Command, was the Conservative candidate.
- Suleman Nagdi, a community worker and businessman, stood as an independent.
- Cllr Sarah Russell, an assistant mayor of Leicester City Council and chair of the Safer Leicester Partnership which coordinates the police, Probation Service, NHS and city council, was the Labour candidate.

Leicestershire Police and Crime Commissioner election, 2012
| Party | Candidate | 1st round | | 2nd round | | | 1st round votesTransfer votes, 2nd round |
| Party | Candidate | Total | Of round | Transfers | Total | Of round | 1st round votesTransfer votes, 2nd round |
|---|---|---|---|---|---|---|---|
| Conservative | Sir Clive Loader | 59,915 | 48.43% | 4,746 | 64,661 | 55.5% | |
| Labour | Sarah Russell | 42,503 | 34.36% | 9,332 | 51,835 | 44.5% | |
| Independent | Suleman Nagdi | 21,292 | 17.21% | | | | |
| Turnout | | 123,710 | 15.92% | | | | |
| Rejected ballots | | 3,371 | 2.65% | | | | |
| Total votes | | 127,081 | 16.36 | | | | |
| Registered electors | | 776,925 | | | | | |
| Conservative win | | | | | | | |

==== Lincolnshire Police ====
- Mervyn Barrett, a crime reduction expert and former government advisor, stood as an independent but withdrew.
- David Bowles, former Chief Executive of Lincolnshire County Council, stood as an independent under the banner "Campaign to Stop Politicians Running Policing".
- Cllr Richard Davies was the Conservative candidate.
- Cllr Paul Gleeson was the Labour candidate.
- Alan Hardwick, former TV presenter, stood as an independent.

Lincolnshire Police and Crime Commissioner election, 2012
| Party | Candidate | 1st round | | 2nd round | | | 1st round votesTransfer votes, 2nd round |
| Party | Candidate | Total | Of round | Transfers | Total | Of round | 1st round votesTransfer votes, 2nd round |
|---|---|---|---|---|---|---|---|
| Independent | Alan Hardwick | 26,272 | 31.37% | 12,949 | 39,221 | 52.8% | |
| Campaign to Stop Politicians Running Policing | David Bowles | 27,345 | 32.66% | 7,741 | 35,086 | 47.2% | |
| Conservative | Richard Davies | 19,872 | 23.73% | | | | |
| Labour | Paul Gleeson | 10,247 | 12.24% | | | | |
| Turnout | | 83,736 | 15.28% | | | | |
| Rejected ballots | | 1,890 | 2.21% | | | | |
| Total votes | | 85,626 | 15.63 | | | | |
| Registered electors | | 547,843 | | | | | |
| Independent win | | | | | | | |

==== Merseyside Police ====
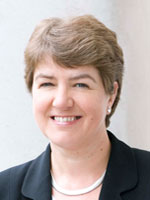
Jane Kennedy

- Geoff Gubb, a businessman, was the Conservative candidate.
- Hilary Jones, a magistrate, was the UKIP candidate.
- Jane Kennedy, former Labour MP for Liverpool Wavertree, was the Labour candidate, having defeated Peter Kilfoyle, former MP for Liverpool Walton in the nomination process.
- Paula Keaveney, former Lib Dem councillor, was the Liberal Democrat candidate.
- Kiron Reid was an independent candidate. A lecturer in law at Liverpool University, former Liverpool City Councillor for Anfield and Merseyside Police Authority member, Reid was a Liberal Democrat activist previously.

Merseyside Police and Crime Commissioner election, 2012
| Party | Candidate | 1st round | | 2nd round | | | 1st round votesTransfer votes, 2nd round |
| Party | Candidate | Total | Of round | Transfers | Total | Of round | 1st round votesTransfer votes, 2nd round |
|---|---|---|---|---|---|---|---|
| Labour | Jane Kennedy | 70,884 | 56.18% | | | | |
| Conservative | Geoff Gubb | 15,870 | 12.58% | | | | |
| Independent | Kiron Reid | 14,379 | 11.40% | | | | |
| Liberal Democrats | Paula Keaveney | 9,192 | 7.29% | | | | |
| UKIP | Hilary Jones | 8,704 | 6.90% | | | | |
| English Democrat | Paul Rimmer | 7,142 | 5.66% | | | | |
| Turnout | | 126,171 | 12.44% | | | | |
| Rejected ballots | | 2,915 | 2.26% | | | | |
| Total votes | | 129,086 | 12.73 | | | | |
| Registered electors | | 1,014,183 | | | | | |
| Labour win | | | | | | | |

==== Norfolk Constabulary ====
- Colonel Jamie Athill was the Conservative candidate.
- Stephen Bett, a former Conservative county councillor and former police authority chairman, stood as an independent candidate.
- Cllr James Joyce, a Norfolk county councillor and former Norfolk Police Authority member, was the Liberal Democrat candidate.
- Cllr Steve Morphew, former leader of Norwich City Council, was the Labour candidate.

Norfolk Police and Crime Commissioner election, 2012
| Party | Candidate | 1st round | | 2nd round | | | 1st round votesTransfer votes, 2nd round |
| Party | Candidate | Total | Of round | Transfers | Total | Of round | 1st round votesTransfer votes, 2nd round |
|---|---|---|---|---|---|---|---|
| Independent | Stephen Bett | 27,842 | 28.66% | 12,146 | 39,988 | 52.2% | |
| Conservative | Jamie Athill | 30,834 | 31.74% | 5,771 | 36,605 | 47.8% | |
| Labour | Steve Morphew | 21,456 | 22.08% | | | | |
| UKIP | Matthew Smith | 9,633 | 9.91% | | | | |
| Liberal Democrats | James Joyce | 7,392 | 7.61% | | | | |
| Turnout | | 97,157 | 14.51% | | | | |
| Rejected ballots | | 3,251 | 3.24% | | | | |
| Total votes | | 100,408 | 15.00 | | | | |
| Registered electors | | 669,387 | | | | | |
| Independent win | | | | | | | |

==== North Yorkshire Police ====
With two candidates, the voting system was first past the post.

North Yorkshire Police and Crime Commissioner election, 2012
| Party | Candidate | Votes | % | ±% |
|---|---|---|---|---|
| Conservative | Julia Mulligan | 47,885 | 58.25% | N/A |
| Labour | Ruth Potter | 34,328 | 41.75% | N/A |
| Turnout | | 82,213 | 13.25% | N/A |
| Rejected ballots | | 6,406 | 7.23% | N/A |
| Total votes | | 88,619 | 14.28 | N/A |
| Registered electors | | 620,497 | | |
| Conservative win | | | | |

==== Northamptonshire Constabulary ====
- Lee Barron, the Labour candidate, announced his intention to withdraw on 31 October, when he revealed that he had committed a minor offence 22 years ago, which meant that he would be ineligible to take up the post if elected. As he missed the official deadline to withdraw, his name still appeared on the ballot paper as the Labour Party candidate.
- Jim MacArthur stood for UKIP.
- John Norrie was an independent candidate.
- Adam Simmonds was the Conservative candidate.
- Paul Varnsverry, former Northampton borough councillor, was the Liberal Democrat candidate.

Northamptonshire Police and Crime Commissioner election, 2012
| Party | Candidate | 1st round | | 2nd round | | | 1st round votesTransfer votes, 2nd round |
| Party | Candidate | Total | Of round | Transfers | Total | Of round | 1st round votesTransfer votes, 2nd round |
|---|---|---|---|---|---|---|---|
| Conservative | Adam Simmonds | 30,436 | 30.08% | 10,487 | 40,923 | 57.3% | |
| Labour | Lee Barron | 25,098 | 24.81% | 5,453 | 30,551 | 42.7% | |
| Independent | John Norrie | 19,276 | 19.05% | | | | |
| UKIP | Jim MacArthur | 18,963 | 18.74% | | | | |
| Liberal Democrats | Paul Varnsverry | 7,394 | 7.31% | | | | |
| Turnout | | 101,167 | 19.50% | | | | |
| Rejected ballots | | 3,474 | 3.32% | | | | |
| Total votes | | 104,641 | 20.17 | | | | |
| Registered electors | | 518,829 | | | | | |
| Conservative win | | | | | | | |

==== Northumbria Police ====
- Vera Baird, former Labour MP for Redcar, was the Labour candidate having defeated Hilton Dawson, former MP for Lancaster and Wyre in the nomination process.
- Alistair Baxter, a businessman with 40 years of experience, was the candidate for UKIP.
- Phil Butler, a former Detective Inspector and Newcastle upon Tyne resident, was the Conservative candidate.
- Peter Andras, a Councillor for Jesmond in Newcastle upon Tyne and a Newcastle University lecturer, was the Liberal Democrat candidate.

Northumbria Police and Crime Commissioner election, 2012
| Party | Candidate | 1st round | | 2nd round | | | 1st round votesTransfer votes, 2nd round |
| Party | Candidate | Total | Of round | Transfers | Total | Of round | 1st round votesTransfer votes, 2nd round |
|---|---|---|---|---|---|---|---|
| Labour | Vera Baird | 100,170 | 56.02% | | | | |
| Conservative | Phil Butler | 45,845 | 25.64% | | | | |
| UKIP | Alistair Baxter | 18,876 | 10.56% | | | | |
| Liberal Democrats | Peter Andras | 13,916 | 7.78% | | | | |
| Turnout | | 178,807 | 16.45% | | | | |
| Rejected ballots | | 3,887 | 2.13% | | | | |
| Total votes | | 182,694 | 16.80 | | | | |
| Registered electors | | 1,087,220 | | | | | |
| Labour win | | | | | | | |

==== Nottinghamshire Police ====
- Dr Raj Chandran, a retired GP, stood as an independent candidate.
- Tony Roberts, Newark and Sherwood District councillor, was the Conservative candidate after the former leader of Bassetlaw District Council, Mike Quigley, pulled out due to a "minor offence" committed in 1968.
- Malcolm Spencer, a former detective who served with the police force for 30 years, stood as an independent candidate.
- Paddy Tipping, former Labour MP for Sherwood, was the Labour candidate.

Nottinghamshire Police and Crime Commissioner election, 2012
| Party | Candidate | 1st round | | 2nd round | | | 1st round votesTransfer votes, 2nd round |
| Party | Candidate | Total | Of round | Transfers | Total | Of round | 1st round votesTransfer votes, 2nd round |
|---|---|---|---|---|---|---|---|
| Labour | Paddy Tipping | 57,356 | 43.13% | 8,563 | 65,919 | 55.5% | |
| Independent | Malcolm Spencer | 30,263 | 22.76% | 22,526 | 52,789 | 44.5% | |
| Conservative | Tony Roberts | 26,304 | 19.78% | | | | |
| Independent | Raj Chandran | 19,050 | 14.33% | | | | |
| Turnout | | 132,973 | 16.42% | | | | |
| Rejected ballots | | 2,769 | 2.04% | | | | |
| Total votes | | 135,742 | 16.77 | | | | |
| Registered electors | | 809,594 | | | | | |
| Labour win | | | | | | | |

==== South Yorkshire Police ====
- David Allen was the English Democrats candidate.
- Jonathan Arnott, General Secretary of the UK Independence Party, was the UKIP candidate
- Nigel Bonson was the Conservative candidate.
- Robert Teal was the Liberal Democrat candidate.
- Shaun Wright, Vice-chair of the South Yorkshire Police Authority, was the Labour candidate, having defeated Meredydd Hughes, former Chief Constable of South Yorkshire Police in the nomination process.

South Yorkshire Police and Crime Commissioner election, 2012
| Party | Candidate | 1st round | | 2nd round | | | 1st round votesTransfer votes, 2nd round |
| Party | Candidate | Total | Of round | Transfers | Total | Of round | 1st round votesTransfer votes, 2nd round |
|---|---|---|---|---|---|---|---|
| Labour | Shaun Wright | 74,615 | 51.35% | | | | |
| English Democrat | David Allen | 22,608 | 15.56% | | | | |
| Conservative | Nigel Bonson | 21,075 | 14.51% | | | | |
| UKIP | Jonathan Arnott | 16,773 | 11.54% | | | | |
| Liberal Democrats | Robert Teal | 10,223 | 7.04% | | | | |
| Turnout | | 145,294 | 14.53% | | | | |
| Rejected ballots | | | | | | | |
| Total votes | | | | | | | |
| Registered electors | | 1,000,015 | | | | | |
| Labour win | | | | | | | |

Shaun Wright resigned on 16 September 2014, necessitating the 2014 South Yorkshire Police and Crime Commissioner by-election

==== Staffordshire Police ====
With two candidates, the voting system was first past the post.

Staffordshire Police and Crime Commissioner election, 2012
| Party | Candidate | Votes | % | ±% |
|---|---|---|---|---|
| Conservative | Matthew Ellis | 51,237 | 51.85% | N/A |
| Labour | Joy Garner | 47,589 | 48.15% | N/A |
| Turnout | | 98,826 | 11.63% | N/A |
| Rejected ballots | | 2,843 | 2.80% | N/A |
| Total votes | | 101,669 | 11.96 | N/A |
| Registered electors | | 849,784 | | |
| Conservative win | | | | |

==== Suffolk Constabulary ====
- Jane Basham was the Labour candidate.
- David Cocks was an independent candidate .
- Cllr Tim Passmore was the Conservative candidate.

Suffolk Police and Crime Commissioner election, 2012
| Party | Candidate | 1st round | | 2nd round | | | 1st round votesTransfer votes, 2nd round |
| Party | Candidate | Total | Of round | Transfers | Total | Of round | 1st round votesTransfer votes, 2nd round |
|---|---|---|---|---|---|---|---|
| Conservative | Tim Passmore | 29,805 | 35.00% | 7,141 | 36,946 | 51.3% | |
| Labour | Jane Basham | 29,967 | 35.19% | 5,038 | 35,005 | 48.7% | |
| Independent | David Cocks | 14,217 | 16.69% | | | | |
| UKIP | Bill Mountford | 11,179 | 13.13% | | | | |
| Turnout | | 85,168 | 15.41% | | | | |
| Rejected ballots | | 3,330 | 3.76% | | | | |
| Total votes | | 88,498 | 16.01 | | | | |
| Registered electors | | 552,780 | | | | | |
| Conservative win | | | | | | | |

==== Surrey Police ====
- Robert Evans, former Labour MEP, was the Labour candidate.
- Kevin Hurley stood as Zero Tolerance Policing Ex Chief.
- Julie Iles, a magistrate, was the Conservative candidate.
- Nick O'Shea was the Liberal Democrat candidate.
- Peter Williams, the former chairman of Surrey Police Authority, was an independent candidate.

Surrey Police and Crime Commissioner election, 2012
| Party | Candidate | 1st round | | 2nd round | | | 1st round votesTransfer votes, 2nd round |
| Party | Candidate | Total | Of round | Transfers | Total | Of round | 1st round votesTransfer votes, 2nd round |
|---|---|---|---|---|---|---|---|
| Zero Tolerance Policing ex Chief | Kevin Hurley | 34,378 | 26.12% | 18,415 | 52,793 | 53.9% | |
| Conservative | Julie Iles | 34,391 | 26.13% | 10,677 | 45,068 | 46.1% | |
| Independent | Peter Williams | 26,292 | 19.97% | | | | |
| Labour | Robert Evans | 17,384 | 13.21% | | | | |
| UKIP | Robert Shatwell | 10,684 | 8.12% | | | | |
| Liberal Democrats | Nick O'Shea | 8,503 | 6.46% | | | | |
| Turnout | | 131,632 | 15.36% | | | | |
| Rejected ballots | | | | | | | |
| Total votes | | | | | | | |
| Registered electors | | 856,968 | | | | | |
| Zero Tolerance Policing ex Chief win | | | | | | | |

==== Sussex Police ====
- Cllr Katy Bourne was the Conservative candidate.
- Ian Chisnall stood as an independent candidate.
- Cllr Godfrey Daniel was the Labour candidate.

Sussex Police and Crime Commissioner election, 2012
| Party | Candidate | 1st round | | 2nd round | | | 1st round votesTransfer votes, 2nd round |
| Party | Candidate | Total | Of round | Transfers | Total | Of round | 1st round votesTransfer votes, 2nd round |
|---|---|---|---|---|---|---|---|
| Conservative | Katy Bourne | 59,635 | 31.51% | 20,393 | 80,028 | 59.0% | |
| Labour | Godfrey Daniel | 40,765 | 21.54% | 14,837 | 55,602 | 41.0% | |
| Independent | Ian Chisnall | 38,930 | 20.57% | | | | |
| UKIP | Tony Armstrong | 29,327 | 15.50% | | | | |
| Liberal Democrats | David Rogers | 20,579 | 10.87% | | | | |
| Turnout | | 189,236 | 15.33% | | | | |
| Rejected ballots | | 5,982 | 3.06% | | | | |
| Total votes | | 195,218 | 15.82 | | | | |
| Registered electors | | 1,234,166 | | | | | |
| Conservative win | | | | | | | |

==== Thames Valley Police ====
- Professor John Howson, an expert in education, a magistrate and a leading member of the Magistrates' Association, was the Liberal Democrat candidate.
- Brigadier Anthony Stansfeld, former Chief of Staff Intelligence in the Far East, was the Conservative candidate.
- Tim Starkey was the Labour candidate.

Thames Valley Police and Crime Commissioner election, 2012
| Party | Candidate | 1st round | | 2nd round | | | 1st round votesTransfer votes, 2nd round |
| Party | Candidate | Total | Of round | Transfers | Total | Of round | 1st round votesTransfer votes, 2nd round |
|---|---|---|---|---|---|---|---|
| Conservative | Anthony Stansfeld | 76,011 | 34.70% | 18,227 | 94,238 | 57.2% | |
| Labour | Tim Starkey | 56,631 | 25.85% | 13,772 | 70,403 | 42.8% | |
| Independent | Geoff Howard | 31,716 | 14.48% | | | | |
| Liberal Democrats | John Howson | 20,511 | 9.36% | | | | |
| UKIP | Barry Cooper | 19,324 | 8.82% | | | | |
| Independent | Patience Tayo Awe | 14,878 | 6.79% | | | | |
| Turnout | | 219,071 | 12.90% | | | | |
| Rejected ballots | | 7,445 | 3.29% | | | | |
| Total votes | | 226,516 | 13.34 | | | | |
| Registered electors | | 1,698,041 | | | | | |
| Conservative win | | | | | | | |

==== Warwickshire Police ====
- Fraser Pithie, former councillor, was the Conservative candidate.
- James Plaskitt, the former Labour MP for Warwick and Leamington, was the Labour candidate.

Warwickshire Police and Crime Commissioner election, 2012
| Party | Candidate | 1st round | | 2nd round | | | 1st round votesTransfer votes, 2nd round |
| Party | Candidate | Total | Of round | Transfers | Total | Of round | 1st round votesTransfer votes, 2nd round |
|---|---|---|---|---|---|---|---|
| Independent | Ron Ball | 21,410 | 33.30% | 11,821 | 33,231 | 56.9% | |
| Labour | James Plaskitt | 22,308 | 34.70% | 2,892 | 25,200 | 43.1% | |
| Conservative | Fraser Pithie | 20,571 | 32.00% | | | | |
| Turnout | | 64,289 | 15.23% | | | | |
| Rejected ballots | | 1,796 | 2.72% | | | | |
| Total votes | | 66,085 | 15.65 | | | | |
| Registered electors | | 422,189 | | | | | |
| Independent win | | | | | | | |

==== West Mercia Police ====
- Cllr Adrian Blackshaw was the Conservative candidate.
- Bill Longmore stood as an independent.
- Simon Murphy, former Labour MEP for West Midlands constituency, was the Labour candidate.

West Mercia Police and Crime Commissioner election, 2012
| Party | Candidate | 1st round | | 2nd round | | | 1st round votesTransfer votes, 2nd round |
| Party | Candidate | Total | Of round | Transfers | Total | Of round | 1st round votesTransfer votes, 2nd round |
|---|---|---|---|---|---|---|---|
| Independent | Bill Longmore | 50,900 | 37.75% | 21,055 | 71,955 | 56.9% | |
| Conservative | Adrian Blackshaw | 49,298 | 36.56% | 5,201 | 54,499 | 43.1% | |
| Labour | Simon Murphy | 34,652 | 25.70% | | | | |
| Turnout | | 134,850 | 14.54% | | | | |
| Rejected ballots | | 4,273 | 3.07% | | | | |
| Total votes | | 139,123 | 15.00 | | | | |
| Registered electors | | 927,649 | | | | | |
| Independent win | | | | | | | |

==== West Midlands Police ====
- Matt Bennett was the Conservative candidate.
- Bob Jones was the Labour candidate.

Bob Jones died on 1 July 2014, necessitating the 2014 West Midlands Police and Crime Commissioner by-election.

West Midlands Police and Crime Commissioner election, 2012
| Party | Candidate | 1st round | | 2nd round | | | 1st round votesTransfer votes, 2nd round |
| Party | Candidate | Total | Of round | Transfers | Total | Of round | 1st round votesTransfer votes, 2nd round |
|---|---|---|---|---|---|---|---|
| Labour | Bob Jones | 100,130 | 42.00% | 17,285 | 117,415 | 67.8% | |
| Conservative | Matt Bennett | 44,130 | 18.51% | 11,555 | 55,685 | 32.2% | |
| Independent | Cath Hannon | 30,778 | 12.91% | | | | |
| UKIP | Bill Etheridge | 17,563 | 7.37% | | | | |
| Independent | Derek Webley | 17,488 | 7.34% | | | | |
| Liberal Democrats | Ayoub Khan | 15,413 | 6.47% | | | | |
| Independent | Mike Rumble | 12,882 | 5.40% | | | | |
| Turnout | | 238,384 | 11.96% | | | | |
| Rejected ballots | | 7,063 | 2.88% | | | | |
| Total votes | | 245,447 | 12.31 | | | | |
| Registered electors | | 1,993,998 | | | | | |
| Labour win | | | | | | | |

==== West Yorkshire Police ====
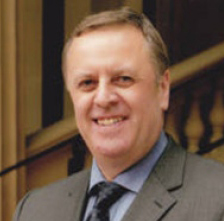
Mark Burns-Williamson

- Mark Burns-Williamson OBE was the Labour candidate.
- Cllr Geraldine Carter was the Conservative candidate.

West Yorkshire Police and Crime Commissioner election, 2012
| Party | Candidate | 1st round | | 2nd round | | | 1st round votesTransfer votes, 2nd round |
| Party | Candidate | Total | Of round | Transfers | Total | Of round | 1st round votesTransfer votes, 2nd round |
|---|---|---|---|---|---|---|---|
| Labour | Mark Burns-Williamson | 102,817 | 47.88% | 11,919 | 114,736 | 61.5% | |
| Independent | Cedric Christie | 49,299 | 22.96% | 22,577 | 71,876 | 38.5% | |
| Conservative | Geraldine Carter | 45,365 | 21.13% | | | | |
| Liberal Democrats | Andrew Marchington | 17,247 | 8.03% | | | | |
| Turnout | | 214,728 | 13.34% | | | | |
| Rejected ballots | | 8,277 | 3.71% | | | | |
| Total votes | | 223,005 | 13.85 | | | | |
| Registered electors | | 1,609,615 | | | | | |
| Labour win | | | | | | | |

==== Wiltshire Police ====
- Paul Batchelor was the Liberal Democrat candidate.
- Cllr Angus Macpherson was the Conservative candidate.
- Claire Moody was the Labour candidate.
- John Short, a former deputy Chief Executive of Swindon Borough Council and then a councillor for Highworth ward (elected as a Conservative) was the UKIP candidate.
- Liam Silcocks stood as an independent.
- Counter terrorism specialist Colin Skelton was an independent candidate.

Wiltshire Police and Crime Commissioner election, 2012
| Party | Candidate | 1st round | | 2nd round | | | 1st round votesTransfer votes, 2nd round |
| Party | Candidate | Total | Of round | Transfers | Total | Of round | 1st round votesTransfer votes, 2nd round |
|---|---|---|---|---|---|---|---|
| Conservative | Angus Macpherson | 28,558 | 36.24% | 6,761 | 35,319 | 62.5% | |
| Labour | Claire Moody | 16,198 | 20.56% | 4,959 | 21,157 | 37.5% | |
| Independent | Colin Skelton | 11,446 | 14.53% | | | | |
| Liberal Democrats | Paul Batchelor | 10,130 | 12.86% | | | | |
| UKIP | John Short | 7,250 | 9.20% | | | | |
| Independent | Liam Silcocks | 5,212 | 6.61% | | | | |
| Turnout | | 78,794 | 15.30% | | | | |
| Rejected ballots | | 2,683 | 3.29% | | | | |
| Total votes | | 81,477 | 15.83 | | | | |
| Registered electors | | 514,855 | | | | | |
| Conservative win | | | | | | | |

=== Wales ===
==== Dyfed-Powys Police ====
With two candidates, the voting system was first past the post.

Dyfed-Powys Police and Crime Commissioner election, 2012
| Party | Candidate | Votes | % | ±% |
|---|---|---|---|---|
| Conservative | Christopher Salmon | 32,887 | 50.86% | N/A |
| Labour | Christine Gwyther | 31,773 | 49.14% | N/A |
| Turnout | | 64,660 | 16.38% | N/A |
| Rejected ballots | | 2,912 | 4.31% | N/A |
| Total votes | | 67,572 | 17.12 | N/A |
| Registered electors | | 394,784 | | |
| Conservative win | | | | |

==== Gwent Police ====
- Retired Chief superintendent Ian Johnston stood as an independent
- Solicitor Hamish Sandison was the Labour candidate.
- Nick Webb was the Conservative candidate.
- Retired Police Sergeant Christopher Edwin Wright stood as an independent

Gwent Police and Crime Commissioner election, 2012
| Party | Candidate | 1st round | | 2nd round | | | 1st round votesTransfer votes, 2nd round |
| Party | Candidate | Total | Of round | Transfers | Total | Of round | 1st round votesTransfer votes, 2nd round |
|---|---|---|---|---|---|---|---|
| Independent | Ian Johnston | 23,531 | 39.64% | 6,217 | 29,748 | 54.7% | |
| Labour | Hamish Sandison | 23,087 | 38.89% | 1,549 | 24,636 | 45.3% | |
| Conservative | Nick Webb | 6,630 | 11.17% | | | | |
| Independent | Christopher Wright | 6,118 | 10.31% | | | | |
| Turnout | | 59,366 | 13.97% | | | | |
| Rejected ballots | | 1,555 | 2.55% | | | | |
| Total votes | | 60,921 | 14.34 | | | | |
| Registered electors | | 424,903 | | | | | |
| Independent win | | | | | | | |

A polling station in Bettws in Newport had a turnout of zero.

==== North Wales Police ====
North Wales Police and Crime Commissioner election, 2012
| Party | Candidate | 1st round | | 2nd round | | | 1st round votesTransfer votes, 2nd round |
| Party | Candidate | Total | Of round | Transfers | Total | Of round | 1st round votesTransfer votes, 2nd round |
|---|---|---|---|---|---|---|---|
| Independent | Winston Roddick | 25,715 | 33.07% | 9,973 | 35,688 | 56.8% | |
| Labour | Tal Michael | 23,066 | 29.67% | 4,062 | 27,128 | 43.2% | |
| Conservative | Colm McCabe | 11,485 | 14.77% | | | | |
| Independent | Richard Hibbs | 11,453 | 14.73% | | | | |
| UKIP | Warwick Nicholson | 6,034 | 7.76% | | | | |
| Turnout | | 77,753 | 14.83% | | | | |
| Rejected ballots | | 2,150 | 2.69% | | | | |
| Total votes | | 79,903 | 15.24 | | | | |
| Registered electors | | 524,252 | | | | | |
| Independent win | | | | | | | |

==== South Wales Police ====
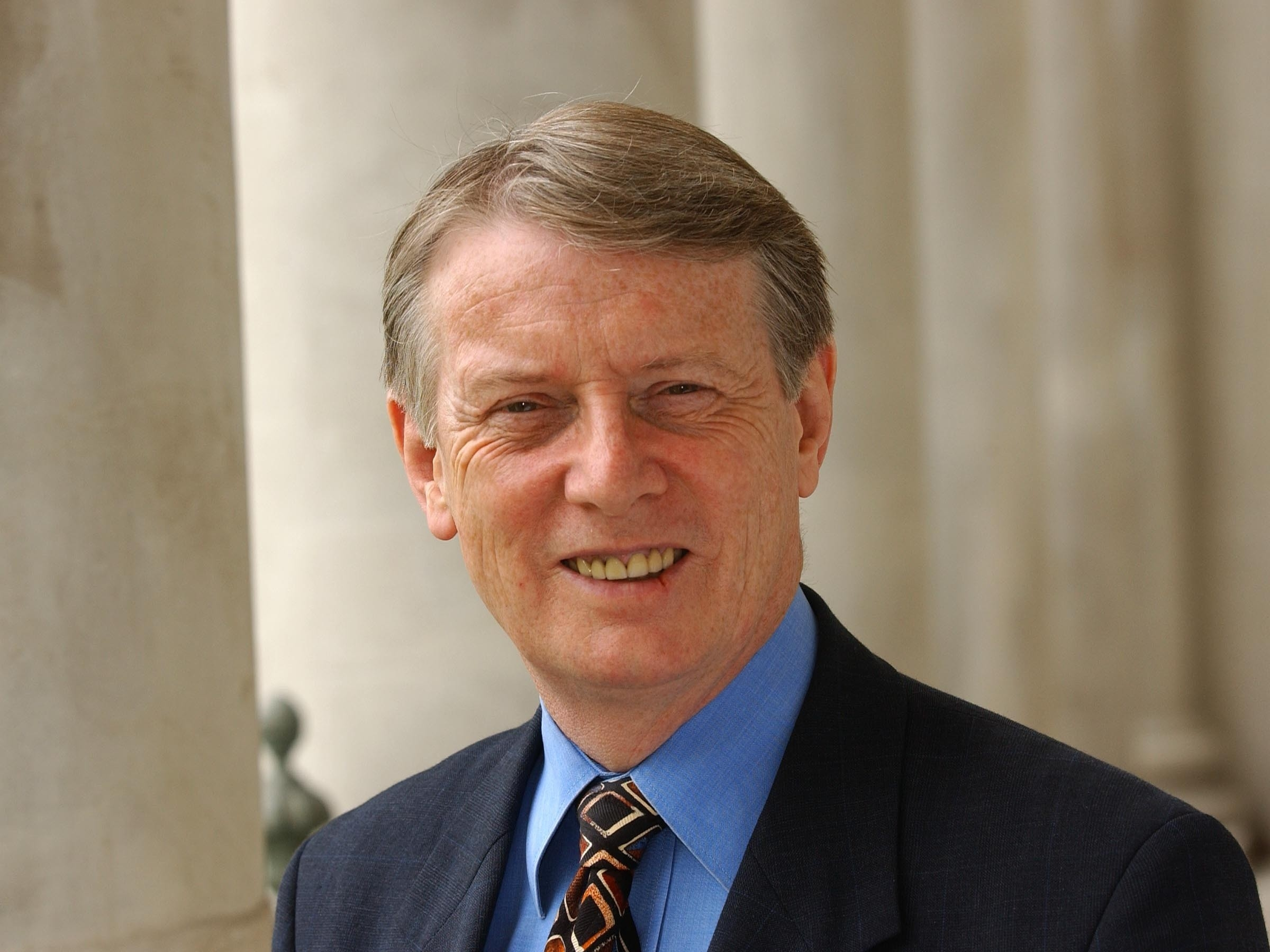
Alun Michael

- Former Police Sergeant turned lawyer Michael A. Baker stood for election as an independent candidate
- Former Prison Officer Caroline Jones was the Conservative Party candidate
- Former First Secretary and Labour and Co-operative MP Alun Michael, who represented Cardiff South and Penarth, was the Labour and Co-operative candidate.
- Retired businessman Antonio Verderame stood as an independent candidate.

South Wales Police and Crime Commissioner election, 2012
| Party | Candidate | 1st round | | 2nd round | | | 1st round votesTransfer votes, 2nd round |
| Party | Candidate | Total | Of round | Transfers | Total | Of round | 1st round votesTransfer votes, 2nd round |
|---|---|---|---|---|---|---|---|
| Labour Co-op | Alun Michael | 66,879 | 46.95% | 5,372 | 72,251 | 54.3% | |
| Independent | Michael A. Baker | 46,264 | 32.48% | 14,520 | 60,784 | 45.7% | |
| Conservative | Caroline Jones | 20,913 | 14.68% | | | | |
| Independent | Antonio Verderame | 8,378 | 5.8% | | | | |
| Turnout | | 142,434 | 14.70% | | | | |
| Rejected ballots | | | | | | | |
| Total votes | | | | | | | |
| Registered electors | | 969,020 | | | | | |
| Labour Co-op win | | | | | | | |
