= Linda Woodhead =

British sociologist of religion and scholar of religious studies

Linda Woodhead MBE FBA FRSE
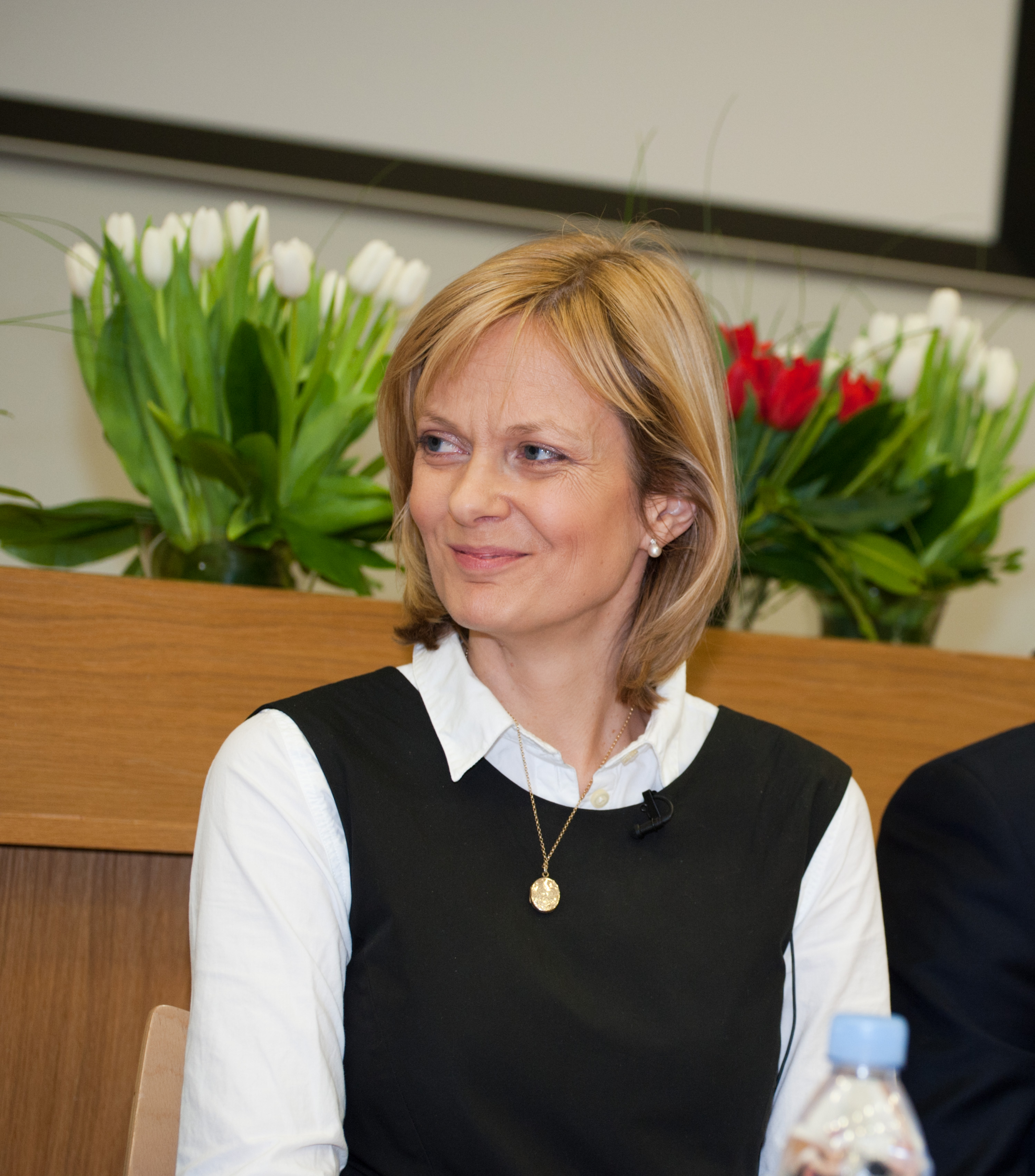
- Woodhead in 2011
- Born: Linda Jane Pauline Woodhead; 15 February 1964 (age 62); Taunton, Somerset, England
- Spouses: Alan Billings (m. 1994; div. 2002); Alexander Mercer (m. 2007)

Academic background
- Education: Bishop Fox's School; Richard Huish College, Taunton
- Alma mater: Emmanuel College, Cambridge

Academic work
- Discipline: Religious studies
- Sub-discipline: Christian theology Sociology of religion Comparative religion
- Institutions: Ripon College Cuddesdon; Lancaster University; King's College London

Linda Jane Pauline Woodhead MBE FBA FRSE (born 15 February 1964) is a British sociologist of religion and scholar of religious studies at King's College London Faculty of Arts and Humanities. She is best known for her work on religious change since the 1980s, and for initiating public debates about faith. She has been described by Matthew Taylor, head of the Royal Society of Arts, as "one of the world's leading experts on religion".

Since 2022, Woodhead has been the FD Maurice Professor and Head of the Department of Theology and Religious Studies at King's College London. Prior to this, she was Professor of Sociology of Religion in the Department of Politics, Philosophy and Religion at Lancaster University from 2006 to 2021. Furthermore, from 2007 to 2012, she was director of the AHRC/ESRC Religion and Society Programme.

== Life and career ==
Woodhead was born in Taunton and grew up in rural Somerset. She attended Bishop Fox's comprehensive school and Richard Huish Sixth Form College in Taunton. She studied Theology and Religious Studies at Emmanuel College, Cambridge and was awarded Double First Class Honours in 1985, receiving the MA by conversion in 1989.

Woodhead undertook her first post as Tutor in Doctrine and Ethics at Ripon College Cuddesdon Oxford (1988–1992).

In 1992, she moved to Lancaster University.

She was awarded an honorary Doctor of Divinity degree by Uppsala University in 2009 and also a Doctor of Letters. She was appointed a Member of the Order of the British Empire (MBE) in the 2013 New Year Honours for services to higher education.

In 2022, she was elected a Fellow of the British Academy (FBA), the United Kingdom's national academy for the humanities and social sciences and a Fellow of the Royal Society of Edinburgh (FRSE).

Woodhead has been married to Alexander Mercer since 2007 and lives between Glasgow and Lancaster. She was previously married to Alan Billings, at one time the South Yorkshire Police and Crime Commissioner.

Woodhead is currently the Head of the Department of Theology and Religious Studies at King's College London.

== Religion and society research programme ==
In 2007, Woodhead was appointed Director of the £12m Religion and Society research programme, funded by the Arts and Humanities Research Council and the Economic and Social Research Council. This initiative funded 265 academics and researchers from 29 different disciplines working on 75 separate research projects and other initiatives including British Religion in Numbers and RadicalisationResearch.org.

== Westminster faith debates ==
Woodhead co-founded the Westminster Faith Debates with former Home Secretary Charles Clarke in 2011. The debates were originally created to publicise findings from the Religion and Society programme, but have since become an annual series. They bring researchers into conversation with prominent figures in public life and have included former Prime Minister Tony Blair, ethologist and atheist author Richard Dawkins, and the former Archbishop of Canterbury Rowan Williams. The debates have been covered by BBC Radio, LBC, The Guardian, The Independent, The Times, the Evening Standard and other UK and international media.

== Research and writing ==
Woodhead has carried out empirical research around the world. She has studied neo-Hinduism, Christianity, spirituality, and Islam in Europe. Her work examines the relationship between religions and social change, especially in modern times.

An Introduction to Christianity (Cambridge University Press 2004), Christianity: a very short introduction (ISBN 9780192803221) (Oxford University Press 2005), and Religions in the Modern World (Routledge 2nd ed. 2009) consider the development of religions over time by examining how they confirm or challenge power relations in wider society. Using this approach Woodhead explains why churches have declined in modern Europe but not elsewhere.

The Spiritual Revolution (ISBN 9781405119597) (co-written with Paul Heelas; Blackwell Publishing 2005) is based on the 'Kendal Project' and documented the growth of alternative spirituality and the relative decline of churches and chapels. In Religion and Change in Modern Britain (ISBN 9780415575812) (co-edited with Rebecca Catto, Routledge 2012) and Everyday Lived Islam in Europe (co-edited with Nadia Jeldtoft et al., Ashgate 2013) Woodhead expanded this approach by showing how new 'post-confessional' ways of being religious have eclipsed a traditional 'Reformation style' of religion in Britain and more widely since the late 1980s.

Woodhead's work on religion, identity, and power is developed in articles on religion and gender, Muslim veiling controversies, governance of religious diversity, religion and politics, religion and law. Her conceptual approach to religion is systematised in A Sociology of Religious Emotion (co-authored with Ole Riis, Oxford University Press 2011) in a schema which integrates religion's bodily, ritual, emotional and cognitive dimensions.

== Policy and media ==
Woodhead is a regular feature and comment writer on religion for The Tablet magazine and The Guardian and The Observer newspapers. She has appeared on BBC One's The Big Questions and BBC Radio 4 programmes including PM, Thought for the Day, Analysis and Thinking Allowed. She has written a major report for the Equality and Human Rights Commission. She was invited to the World Economic Forum summit in Davos in 2013.

== Controversies ==
Professor Woodhead has publicly expressed concern about the growing number of cuts and closures impacting Theology and Religions Studies departments.

== Published works ==
- Richards, Jeffrey; Wilson, Scott; Woodhead, Linda, eds. (1999). Diana, The Making of a Media Saint. London: I.B. Taurus. ISBN 978-1-86064-388-0.
- Woodhead, Linda; Heelas, Paul, eds. (2000). Religion in Modern Times: An Interpretive Anthology. Religion and Modernity. Oxford, England: Blackwell Publishers. ISBN 978-0-631-21073-3.
- ———, ed. (2001). Reinventing Christianity: Nineteenth-Century Contexts. Aldershot, England: Ashgate Publishing. ISBN 978-0-7546-1650-4.
- ———; Heelas, Paul, eds. (2001). Peter Berger and the Study of Religion. London: Routledge. ISBN 978-0-415-21531-2.
- ———; Fletcher, Paul; Kawanami, Hiroko; Smith, David, eds. (2002). Religions in the Modern World: Traditions and Transformations. London: Routledge. ISBN 978-0-415-21784-2.
- Davie, Grace; Heelas, Paul; Woodhead, Linda, eds. (2003). Predicting Religion: Christian, Secular and Alternative Futures. Theology and Religion in Interdisciplinary Perspectives Series. Aldershot, England: Ashgate Publishing. ISBN 978-0-7546-3009-8.
- Guest, Mathew; Tusting, Karin; Woodhead, Linda, eds. (2004). Congregational Studies in the UK: Christianity in a Post-Christian Context. Explorations in Practical, Pastoral and Empirical Theology. Aldershot, England: Ashgate Publishing. ISBN 978-0-7546-3289-4.
- Woodhead, Linda (2004). Christianity: A Very Short Introduction. Very Short Introductions. Vol. 119. Oxford University Press. ISBN 978-0-19-280322-1.
- ——— (2004). An Introduction to Christianity. Cambridge University Press. ISBN 978-0-521-45445-2.
- Heelas, Paul; Woodhead, Linda (2005). The Spiritual Revolution: Why Religion is Giving Way to Spirituality. Religion and Spirituality in the Modern World. Oxford, England: Blackwell Publishers. ISBN 978-1-4051-1959-7.
- Soulen, R. Kendall; Woodhead, Linda, eds. (2006). God and Human Dignity. Grand Rapids, Michigan: Wm. B. Eerdmans Publishing Company. ISBN 978-0-8028-3395-2.
- Woodhead, Linda; Kawanami, Hiroko; Partridge, Christopher, eds. (2009). Religions in the Modern World: Traditions and Transformations (2nd ed.). London: Routledge. ISBN 978-0-415-45890-0.
- Riis, Ole; Woodhead, Linda (2010). A Sociology of Religious Emotions. Oxford University Press. ISBN 978-0-19-956760-7.
- Woodhead, Linda, ed. (2013). Religion and Personal Life. London: Darton, Longman & Todd. ISBN 978-0-232-53018-6.
- Dessing, Nathal M.; Jeldtoft, Nadia; Nielsen, Jørgen S.; Woodhead, Linda, eds. (2013). Everyday Lived Islam in Europe. Farnham, England: Ashgate Publishing. ISBN 978-1-4724-1753-4.

Non-profit organization positions
Preceded by John Barton	President of Modern Church; 2011–2019	Succeeded by Elaine Graham
