= Paul Fletcher =

Paul Fletcher may refer to:

- Paul Fletcher (footballer) (born 1951), retired English professional footballer
- Paul Fletcher (politician) (born 1965), Liberal member of the Australian House of Representatives
- Paul Fletcher (theologian) (1965–2008), English Roman Catholic philosophical theologian and lecturer
- Paul Fletcher (baseball) (born 1967), American baseball player
- Paul J. Fletcher, US Air Force officer
- Paul Fletcher (musician), English drummer
