= Heelas =

Heelas may mean:

- Heelas, the former name of the John Lewis & Partners department store in Reading, Berkshire, England
- Paul Heelas (born 1946), a British sociologist and anthropologist
- Olayinka Herbert Samuel Heelas Badmus Macaulay (14 November 1864 – 7 May 1946), a Nigerian nationalist, politician, engineer, architect, journalist, and musician.
