= 2014 South Yorkshire Police and Crime Commissioner by-election =

UK regional election

- 30 October 2014

Position of South Yorkshire Police and Crime Commissioner
- Turnout: 14.88% (▼0.05%)
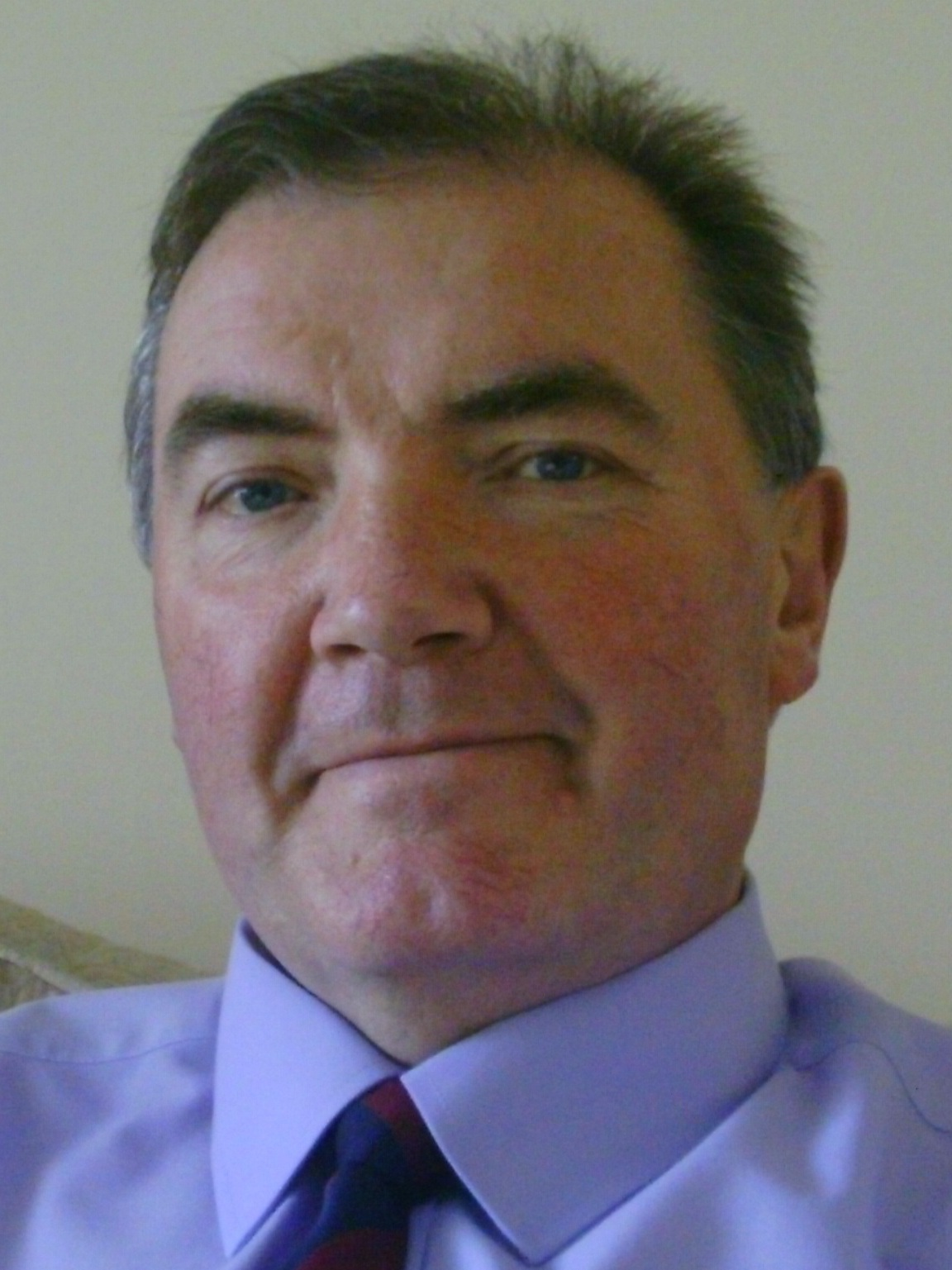
	First party	Second party
	Lab
Candidate	Alan Billings	Jack Clarkson
Party	Labour	UKIP
Popular vote	74,060	46,883
Percentage	50.02%	31.66%
Swing	▼1.33%	▲20.12%
	Third party	Fourth party
	Con	ED
Candidate	Ian Walker	David Allen
Party	Conservative	English Democrat
Popular vote	18,536	8,583
Percentage	12.52%	5.80%
Swing	▼1.99%	▼9.76%
PPC before election
Shaun Wright
Labour
Subsequent PPC
Alan Billings
Labour

The South Yorkshire Police and Crime Commissioner by-election was a 2014 by-election on 30 October 2014 for the position of Police and Crime Commissioner in the South Yorkshire Police region of the United Kingdom. It was triggered by the resignation of Shaun Wright, the inaugural South Yorkshire Police and Crime Commissioner, who stepped down from the position on 16 September 2014 following the Rotherham child sexual exploitation scandal. Wright had been head of children's services in Rotherham between 2005 and 2010, while events surrounding the scandal were taking place. The Labour candidate, Alan Billings, was elected.

== Background ==
Wright was the first Police and Crime Commissioner for the area, elected as the Labour Party candidate on 15 November 2012. He was previously a local councillor and member of the police authority.

The Independent Inquiry into Child Sexual Exploitation in Rotherham reported in August 2014. Given his prior council role and then current PCC role, there were calls for Wright to resign, including from the Labour Party, and the Conservative Prime Minister and Home Secretary. Labour threatened to suspend him from the party if he did not resign, leading to Wright leaving the Labour Party on 28 August 2014. Wright's deputy, Tracey Cheetham, resigned, calling on him to do the same. On 3 September 2014, Sheffield City Council unanimously passed a symbolic motion of no confidence in Wright, calling for his resignation. (Legislation means there is no power of recall for PCCs and the only way they can be removed is if they commit misconduct in public office, or are convicted of an offence with a custodial sentence of two or more years.)

On 16 September 2014, Wright resigned as Police and Crime Commissioner for South Yorkshire, triggering the by-election.

== Candidates and campaign ==
On 3 October, Barnsley Borough Council (who oversaw the election) confirmed that four candidates had been validly nominated, representing four of the five parties who contested the 2012 election.

David Allen, who came second in the 2012 election, stood again for the English Democrats.

Labour's candidate, Dr the Reverend Alan Billings, was deputy leader of Sheffield City Council 1981–6. A parish priest in Sheffield and a member of the Youth Justice Board for England & Wales and of the England Committee of the Big Lottery Fund. He has worked with the British Army on their ethical policies and was previously director of the Centre for Ethics and Religion at Lancaster University.

Ian Walker of Sheffield, the managing director of Rotary Electrical UK, stood for the Conservatives.

UKIP's candidate, Jack Clarkson is a former police inspector in the South Yorkshire Police. Previously a Liberal Democrat councillor. Then a UKIP councillor, before becoming leader of the UKIP group on Sheffield City Council. UKIP leader, Nigel Farage, said the result of the by-election "would be a key factor in determining the party's general election strategy in the region in 2015."

The fifth party to stand in the previous election, the Liberal Democrats, did not contest the by-election following the assessment of their leader and South Yorkshire MP, Nick Clegg, that PCCs are "a failed experiment".

== Results ==
Turnout was 14.88%.

South Yorkshire Police and Crime Commissioner by-election, 30 October 2014
Party	Candidate	1st round		2nd round			1st round votesTransfer votes, 2nd round
Party	Candidate	Total	Of round	Transfers	Total	Of round	1st round votesTransfer votes, 2nd round
Labour	Alan Billings	74,060	50.02%				
UKIP	Jack Clarkson	46,883	31.66%				
Conservative	Ian Walker	18,536	12.52%				
English Democrat	David Allen	8,583	5.80%				
Turnout		148,062	14.88%				
Labour hold							

== Previous result ==
South Yorkshire Police and Crime Commissioner election, 2012
Party	Candidate	1st round		2nd round			1st round votesTransfer votes, 2nd round
Party	Candidate	Total	Of round	Transfers	Total	Of round	1st round votesTransfer votes, 2nd round
Labour	Shaun Wright	74,615	51.35%				
English Democrat	David Allen	22,608	15.56%				
Conservative	Nigel Bonson	21,075	14.51%				
UKIP	Jonathan Arnott	16,773	11.54%				
Liberal Democrats	Robert Teal	10,223	7.04%				
Turnout		145,294	14.93%				
Rejected ballots							
Total votes							
Registered electors		1,000,015					
Labour win							
