= General Fletcher =

General Fletcher may refer to:

- Antonio Fletcher (fl. 1980s–2020s), U.S. Army lieutenant general
- Isaac Fletcher (1784–1842), Adjutant General of the Vermont Militia
- Paul J. Fletcher (fl. 1970s–2000s), U.S. Air Force major general
- Robert Fletcher (East India Company officer) (c. 1738–1776), Madras Army brigadier general
