= AHRC/ESRC Religion and Society Programme =

The AHRC/ESRC Religion and Society Programme was a five-year strategic research initiative funded by two UK research councils: the Arts and Humanities Research Council and the Economic and Social Research Council, running from 2007 to 2012. It funded 75 projects across UK universities investigating various aspects of the complex relationships between religion and society, both historical and contemporary.

== Research ==
Research supported includes the website "British Religion in Numbers", providing statistics on religion in Britain led by Professor David Voas at Manchester University. Other work includes Professor Kim Knott at Leeds University's restudy of British media coverage of religion and spirituality and an investigation of Hindu, Muslim and Sikh shrine practices across the Punjab led by Dr Tej Purewal, also at Manchester. Phase 2 of the Programme focused on Youth and Religion specifically, supporting projects like Dr Basia Spalek at Birmingham University's research into police partnerships with young Muslims.

The Religion and Society Programme is hosted at Lancaster University, and directed by Professor Linda Woodhead helped by Dr Rebecca Catto (Research Associate) and Peta Ainsworth (Administrator). The Programme helps to organize various events such as a day at the British Library asking ‘Where next for religion in the public sphere?’ in July 2010 and a closed seminar asking ‘Child abuse in the Catholic Church – what can be learned?’ at Heythrop College London in November 2010.

== Sources ==
- Giovanni, G. D. (2003). Faith without religion, religion without faith: Kant and hegel on religion. Journal of the History of Philosophy, 41(3), 365.
- Gruber, J., & Hungerman, D. M. (2008). The church versus the mall: What happens when religion faces increased secular competition? The Quarterly Journal of Economics, 123(2), 831.
- Kaelber, L. (2004). Sociology of religion: A historical Introduction/Religion in society: A sociology of Religion/Religion: The social Context/Religion in sociological Perspective/Invitation to the sociology of religion. Teaching Sociology, 32(3), 329–332.
- Kaelber, L. (2002). Sociology of religion: Theoretical and comparative perspectives / sociology of religion: Contemporary developments / A comparative sociology of world religions: Virtuosos, priests, and popular religion. Teaching Sociology, 30(4), 496.
- Trundle, R. C. (2012). AMERICA'S RELIGION VERSUS RELIGION IN AMERICA: A PHILOSOPHIC PROFILE. Journal for the Study of Religions and Ideologies, 11(33), 3-20.
