= South Yorkshire Police and Crime Commissioner =

- Police and crime commissioner of South Yorkshire Police
- Reports to: South Yorkshire Police and Crime Panel
- Appointer: Electorate of South Yorkshire
- Term length: Four years
- Constituting instrument: Police Reform and Social Responsibility Act 2011
- Precursor: South Yorkshire Police Authority
- Inaugural holder: Shaun Wright
- Formation: 22 November 2012
- Abolished: 7 May 2024
- Deputy: Deputy South Yorkshire Police and Crime Commissioner
- Website: www.southyorkshire-pcc.gov.uk

The South Yorkshire Police and Crime Commissioner was the police and crime commissioner of the South Yorkshire Police in South Yorkshire.

The post was created on 22 November 2012, following an election held on 15 November 2012, and replaced the South Yorkshire Police Authority.

The current South Yorkshire Police and Crime Commissioner is Alan Billings of the Labour Party, who was elected in 2014 and again in 2016.

The role was created in 2012 and the initial office holder was Shaun Wright, who resigned on 16 September 2014. The police and crime commissioner is required to produce a strategic South Yorkshire Police and Crime Plan, setting out the priorities for the South Yorkshire Police, and their work is scrutinised by the South Yorkshire Police and Crime Panel.

The police and crime commissioner functions for the South Yorkshire Police area were transferred to the Mayor of South Yorkshire from 7 May 2024.

== List of office holders ==
Name	Political party	From	To
Shaun Wright	Labour	22 November 2012	16 September 2014
Steve Pick (acting)	Independent	18 September 2014	3 November 2014
Alan Billings	Labour	3 November 2014	7 May 2024

== Elections ==
The South Yorkshire Police and Crime Commissioner was elected by the supplementary vote system where there are three or more candidates, or the first past the post system if there are only two. The first election took place in November 2012 (delayed from May 2012) and the next regular election was scheduled for May 2016. Elections take place every four years. The electorate are resident in the four metropolitan boroughs of Barnsley, Doncaster, Rotherham and Sheffield that make up South Yorkshire.

=== 2012 ===
The first election was held in 2012. The candidates were:

- David Allen was the English Democrats candidate.
- Jonathan Arnott, General Secretary of the UK Independence Party, was the UKIP candidate
- Nigel Bonson was the Conservative candidate.
- Robert Teal was the Liberal Democrat candidate.
- Shaun Wright, Vice-Chair of the South Yorkshire Police Authority, was the Labour candidate, having defeated Meredydd Hughes, former Chief Constable of South Yorkshire Police in the nomination process.

South Yorkshire Police and Crime Commissioner election, 2012
Party	Candidate	1st round		2nd round			1st round votesTransfer votes, 2nd round
Party	Candidate	Total	Of round	Transfers	Total	Of round	1st round votesTransfer votes, 2nd round
Labour	Shaun Wright	74,615	51.35%				
English Democrat	David Allen	22,608	15.56%				
Conservative	Nigel Bonson	21,075	14.51%				
UKIP	Jonathan Arnott	16,773	11.54%				
Liberal Democrats	Robert Teal	10,223	7.04%				
Turnout		145,294	14.53%				
Rejected ballots							
Total votes							
Registered electors		1,000,015					
Labour win							

=== 2014 ===
Following the resignation of Shaun Wright on 16 September 2014, a by-election must be held within 35 working days by virtue of Section 51 of the Police Reform and Social Responsibility Act 2011. The election was held on 30 October 2014. Turnout was 14.88%.

South Yorkshire Police and Crime Commissioner by-election, 30 October 2014
Party	Candidate	1st round		2nd round			1st round votesTransfer votes, 2nd round
Party	Candidate	Total	Of round	Transfers	Total	Of round	1st round votesTransfer votes, 2nd round
Labour	Alan Billings	74,060	50.02%				
UKIP	Jack Clarkson	46,883	31.66%				
Conservative	Ian Walker	18,536	12.52%				
English Democrat	David Allen	8,583	5.80%				
Turnout		148,062	14.88%				
Labour hold							

=== 2016 ===
This election was held on 5 May 2016.

South Yorkshire Police and Crime Commissioner election, 5 May 2016
Party	Candidate	1st round		2nd round			1st round votesTransfer votes, 2nd round
Party	Candidate	Total	Of round	Transfers	Total	Of round	1st round votesTransfer votes, 2nd round
Labour	Alan Billings	144,978	51.93%				
UKIP	Gavin Felton	57,062	20.44%				
Conservative	Ian Walker	29,904	10.71%				
Liberal Democrats	Joe Otten	28,060	10.05%				
English Democrat	David Allen	19,114	6.84%				
Turnout		279,148	28.4%				
Labour hold							

=== 2021 ===
2021 South Yorkshire police and crime commissioner election
Party	Candidate	Votes	%	±%
Labour	Alan Billings*	165,442	53.9	+2.0
Conservative	David Chinchen	98,851	32.2	+21.5
Liberal Democrats	Joe Otten	42,462	13.8	+3.7
Turnout		306,755	30.9	
Labour hold				

== Powers and functions ==
The powers and functions of the South Yorkshire Police and Crime Commissioner are derived from the Police Reform and Social Responsibility Act 2011, replacing those of the South Yorkshire Police Authority. The main functions are:

- Appoint the chief constable of South Yorkshire Police
- Publish, and periodically refresh, a five-year police and crime plan that sets out policing priorities
- Set the annual budget and precept (tax) level
- Publish an annual report and accounts.

The work of the South Yorkshire Police and Crime Commissioner is scrutinised by the South Yorkshire Police and Crime Panel, made up of elected councillors from the four local authorities in South Yorkshire.

== Police and crime plan ==
The South Yorkshire Police and Crime Plan 2013/17 was published in 2013 and was refreshed in 2014.

== Salary ==
The annual salary of the South Yorkshire Police and Crime Commissioner was £86,700 in 2021.
