= Alan Billings =

British police commissioner

The Reverend Canon Alan Billings

South Yorkshire Police and Crime Commissioner
- In office 3 November 2014 – 7 May 2024
- Preceded by: Shaun Wright
- Succeeded by: Office abolished

Deputy Leader of Sheffield City Council
- In office 1981–1986
- Leader: David Blunkett

Personal details
- Born: Alan Roy Billings; 7 October 1942 (age 84) Leicester, England
- Party: Labour
- Spouses: Daphne Thomas (m. 1966; div. 1993); Linda Woodhead (m. 1994; div. 2002); Veronica Hardstaff (m. 2007)
- Children: 2 sons
- Education: Emmanuel College, Cambridge; University of Bristol; Lincoln Theological College

Alan Roy Billings (born 7 October 1942) is an Anglican priest and Labour politician who served as the South Yorkshire Police and Crime Commissioner from 2014 to 2024.

== Early life and education ==
Billings was born into a working-class family in Leicester in 1942. His father, Paul Billings, worked at Imperial Typewriters and his mother, Dorothy (née Siddons), at Byfords Hosiery. He was educated at Wyggeston Grammar School for Boys, Leicester. He went on to study Theology and Philosophy at Emmanuel College, Cambridge (1962-5), receiving a BA degree. He holds a Certificate in Education from Bristol University and further degrees from Leicester University and the New York Theological Seminary.

== Career ==
Billings trained as a priest at Lincoln Theological College. He was ordained deacon and priest in Leicester Cathedral and was curate at St Mary, Knighton, Leicester. He was an elected member of Leicester City Council for three years.

He served as a parish priest in Sheffield at St Silas, Broomhall, and St Mary, Beighton. He then became Head of Religious and Social Studies at Broadway School, Barnsley, before returning to parish ministry as Vicar of St Mary, Walkley.

While a parish priest in Sheffield he was also a member of Sheffield City Council, becoming Deputy Leader when David Blunkett was Leader (1975–86), and a member of the governing body of Sheffield City Polytechnic. The later years were times of conflict between local authorities and the government of Margaret Thatcher.

He was a member of the Archbishops' Commission on Urban Priority Areas which produced the report Faith in the City, following the inner-city riots of 1981 (1983-5).

He was Vice Principal of Ripon College Cuddesdon, Oxford, an Anglican theological college, and Director of the Oxford Institute for Church and Society (1986–92). He became Principal of the West Midlands Ministerial Training Course and Acting Principal of Queens College, Birmingham, an ecumenical theological college (1991-4). He then returned to parish ministry as Vicar of St George, Kendal, Cumbria.

He was an honorary Senior Research Fellow of Lancaster University and Director of the Centre for Ethics and Religion (1994–2007), researching the contribution of inter-faith activities towards community cohesion and the attitude of 15 year olds to people of another faith in North West mill towns.

He has held a number of positions in the public sector. He was a board member of the Funding Agency for Schools (1997-9); a Schools Adjudicator (1999–2006); a member of the Home Office Community Cohesion Panel (2002-4). He was a board member of the Youth Justice Board for England and Wales (2004–11), Chair of the Cumbria Courts Board and a member of the England Committee of the Big Lottery Fund (2007–13).

He has been a contributor to BBC Radio 4's Thought for the Day.

He is a Fellow of the Royal Society of Arts and an emeritus canon of Carlisle Cathedral.

== Police and Crime Commissioner ==
In 2014 Billings was selected as the Labour Party candidate for the South Yorkshire Police and Crime Commissioner by-election, to replace the former PCC and Rotherham Borough councillor, Shaun Wright. He received just over 50% of first preference votes on the first ballot and was elected. The turnout was 14.8%. He had the task of holding the South Yorkshire Police force to account during highly publicised and difficult times – the searching of the home of Sir Cliff Richard, and the aftermath of the Professor Alexis Jay and Louise Casey Reports into Child Exploitation in Rotherham and the conclusion of the Hillsborough inquests into the death of 96 men, women and children at Sheffield Wednesday Football Club in 1989. He also helped secure Home Office funding for South Yorkshire Police to continue their investigation into the disappearance of Ben Needham as a toddler on the Greek Island of Kos. He is seeking to build bridges between the force and the Orgreave Truth and Justice Campaign, agreeing in 2016 that an archivist should be appointed to put the archives in order, employed by the Office of the Police and Crime Commissioner.

In April 2016 the Hillsborough inquests concluded bringing in verdicts of unlawful killing. The jury also said that Liverpool football supporters did not cause or contribute towards the deaths of the 96. South Yorkshire Police and its Chief Constable received immediate criticism as a result of which Billings suspended him citing an erosion of trust and confidence. This was challenged in the High Court by way of judicial review when the suspension and later dismissal were both found to be unlawful. Billings appointed the Deputy Chief Constable of Durham as the new chief constable from November 2016.

In 2021, Billings criticised the use of smart motorways.

== Personal life ==
Billings married Veronica Hardstaff in 2007, a former Labour councillor on Sheffield City Council and Member of the European Parliament for Lincolnshire and Humberside South (1994–99). He was previously married to Daphne Thomas (1966–93), with whom he had two sons, and Linda Woodhead (1994–2002).

== Bibliography ==
Billings has written a number of books:

- Dying and Grieving: A Guide to Pastoral Ministry (2002)
- Secular Lives, Sacred Hearts: The Role of the Church in a Time of No Religion (2004)
- God and Community Cohesion: Help or Hindrance? (2009)
- Making God Possible: The task of ordained ministry present and future (2010)
- Lost Church: Why we must find it again (2013)
- The Dove, the Fig Leaf and the Sword: Why Christianity changes its mind about war (2014).

Civic offices
Preceded by Shaun Wright	Police and Crime Commissioner for South Yorkshire; 2014–2024	Succeeded by Office abolished
Preceded by	Deputy Leader of Sheffield City Council; 1980–1986	Succeeded by Clive Betts
