= Paul Heelas =

British sociologist and anthropologist

Paul Lauchlan Faux Heelas (born 1946) is a British sociologist and anthropologist. He is noted for work in the field of spirituality, religion and modernity, with special reference to 'New Age' spiritualities of life. Recent publications and current research explore 'the sacred' and 'the secular'; transgressions of the secular (idealization, vitalization); 'life force', CAM, and 'spiritual humanism' (including 'third force' Sufism).

Heelas was educated at St Catherine's College, Oxford (BA Geography; Diploma, with Distinction, in Social Anthropology) and Exeter College, Oxford (DPhil Anthropology).

He served as Professor in Religion and Modernity, Department of Religious Studies, Lancaster University, and as Senior Research Professor in the Sociology of Contemporary Spirituality, Department of Sociology, CROCUS research group, Erasmus University Rotterdam.

He spent over three years devoted to field research: Nepal (Sherpa religion), London (Programmes Ltd and Exegesis), Brazil (holistic Rio de Janeiro), India ('New Age' Madras and environs), Pakistan ('New Age' Islamabad and environs) and lived in Nepal, Thailand, India, Bangladesh, Uganda, and Pakistan for over six years.

Heelas has helped found two journals: the Journal of the Anthropological Society of Oxford and Cultural Values [now the Journal for Cultural Research]. He is also a member of advisory board of "Open Theology".

== Major research projects ==
- Study of Exegesis and Programmes Ltd ('The Business of Transformation and the Transformation of Business')
- The Kendal Project ('Patterns of the Sacred in Contemporary Society') which analyzed spirituality in mostly Protestant churches.
- The Burnley Project (See Andrew Holden Religious Cohesion in Times of Conflict: Christian-Muslim Relations in Segregated Towns (2009))

== Publications ==
=== A trilogy of volumes exploring 'alternative', inner-life spiritualities ===
- 1996 The New Age Movement: The Celebration of the Self and the Sacralization of Modernity. Blackwell. ISBN 0-631-19332-4
- 2005 Paul Heelas and Linda Woodhead, with Benjamin Seel, Bronislaw Szerszynski and Karin Tusting, The Spiritual Revolution: Why Religion is Giving Way to Spirituality. Blackwell. ISBN 1-4051-1959-4
- 2008 Spiritualities of Life: New Age Romanticism and Consumptive Capitalism. Blackwell. ISBN 978-1-4051-3938-0

A study of Bhagwan Shree Rajneesh/Osho's path:

- 1986/1988 Judith Thompson and Paul Heelas, The Way of the Heart: The Rajneesh Movement. Thorsons. ISBN 0-85030-434-2; Borgo Press.

=== Spirituality in the Modern World ===
- 2012 Paul Heelas (ed.) Spirituality in the Modern World: Within Religious Tradition and Beyond. 4-Volume Set; three introductory essays by Heelas: 'On Making Some Sense of Spirituality', 'On Some Major Issues', 'On Some Significant Themes'. Routledge. ISBN 978-0-415-49029-0

=== Cultural selves (spirituality/religion) ===
- 1981 Paul Heelas and Andrew Lock (eds), Indigenous Psychologies: The Anthropology of the Self. Academic Press. ISBN 0-12-336480-9

=== Spirituality/religion; culture/society ===
- 1992 Paul Heelas and Paul Morris (eds), The Values of the Enterprise Culture: The Moral Debate. Routledge. ISBN 0-415-07615-3
- 1996 Paul Heelas, Scott Lash and Paul Morris (eds), Detraditionalization: Critical Reflections on Authority and Identity. Blackwell. ISBN 1-55786-555-8
- 1998 Paul Heelas (ed.), with the assistance of David Martin and Paul Morris, Religion, Modernity and Postmodernity. Blackwell. ISBN 0-631-19848-2
- 2000 Linda Woodhead and Paul Heelas (eds), Religion in Modern Times: An Interpretive Anthology. Blackwell. ISBN 0-631-21074-1
- 2001 Linda Woodhead, with Paul Heelas and David Martin (eds), Peter Berger and the Study of Religion. Routledge. ISBN 0-415-21531-5
- 2003 Grace Davie, Paul Heelas and Linda Woodhead (eds), Predicting Religion: Christianity, Secular and Alternative Futures. Ashgate. ISBN 0-7546 0739 9
