= Meredydd Hughes =

Welsh chief constable working in England

Meredydd John Hughes CBE QPM

Chief Constable of South Yorkshire Police
- In office 2004–2011
- Preceded by: Mike Hedges
- Succeeded by: Robert Dyson QPM

Deputy Chief Constable of South Yorkshire Police
- In office 2002–2004

Assistant Chief Constable of Greater Manchester Police
- In office 1999–2002

Personal details
- Born: Meredydd John Hughes

Meredydd John Hughes CBE QPM is a retired British police officer. He served as Chief Constable of South Yorkshire Police from 1 September 2004 to 2011.

Hughes started his career at South Wales Constabulary in 1979, and was transferred to West Yorkshire Police in 1995 to a position of Superintendent. He was promoted in 1999 to the rank of Assistant Chief Constable of Greater Manchester Police. In 2002 he moved to South Yorkshire Police to take over the position of Deputy Chief Constable, before becoming the force's Chief Constable in 2004. He was awarded the Queen's Police Medal in the 2006 New Year Honours.

During his career Hughes held a number of operational responsibilities, including work as a firearms officer, IT Project manager, and Silver Commander of games held at Leeds United F.C. As a senior manager, he was responsible for Operational Support, Uniform Operations, Press & PR, Professional Standards and Information Systems during various stages of his career.

As a member of ACPO, he was the Chair of Roads Policing Enforcement Technology Committee and Vice Chair of the National Operations Forum and Chair of the Drivers Project (placing new databases such as drivers and motor insurance records on PNC), until resigning the post in December 2007.

As Assistant Chief Constable in Greater Manchester, Hughes commanded the planning and delivery of the 2002 Commonwealth Games policing operation. Whilst Chief Constable in South Yorkshire, the Force was rated by the HMIC as one of the four most improved forces in the country. He led the response to the South Yorkshire flooding of 2007, and dealt with a number of major events and incidents, retaining his status as a Gold Public Order and Firearms Commander.

Hughes was a member of the Association of Chief Police Officers, serving as ACPO's Head of Roads Policing and then as Head of the Uniformed Operations Business Area. His responsibilities included the oversight of all ACPO's firearms issues, public order, roads policing, specialist operations and emergency planning. He retired having worked on part of the police planning for the 2012 Olympic Games and also oversaw changes to the service following Stockwell and the 2009 G-20 London summit protests.

In 2005 he led the ACPO team co-ordinating the England and Wales resources for the G8 Summit at Gleneagles, and played a role in the national response to the 7 July 2005 London bombings. In 2010 he coordinated the policing of the Papal visit.

He retired from the police service in October 2011, and is a Company Director and Consultant. The Institute of Directors (IoD) named him as "Chartered Director of the Year 2011" in September 2011

Hughes was appointed Commander of the Order of the British Empire (CBE) in the 2012 New Year Honours.

== Traffic controversy ==
Hughes received press attention through being prosecuted for exceeding the speed limit in North Wales in May 2007. He received a 42-day driving ban and fine for the offence, imposed by Wrexham Magistrates Court on 5 December 2007. At the time of the offence he was Chair of the Roads Policing Enforcement Technology Committee for ACPO, resigning this position at the time of the court summons. He had also argued for less conspicuous Speed Cameras. In 2006 Hughes was fined £500 by Rotherham Magistrates Court for failing to identify the driver of a South Yorkshire Police vehicle, as a result of him mounting a prosecution against himself.

== Politics ==
In 2012, he revealed his intentions to stand as a Labour Party candidate for the South Yorkshire Police Police and Crime Commissioner, despite previously stating the creation of the position was a mistake. The nomination was contested between Hughes, Anglican Priest Alan Billings and Shaun Wright, a magistrate and local councillor. Shaun Wright won the nomination and was subsequently elected as the PCC.

== Jay Report ==
In August 2014 Jay Report was published and outlined the widespread sexual abuse (and associated criminality) of young white girls in Rotherham by Britons of predominantly Pakistani origin. The report highlighted that the police did not respond appropriately to reports of abuse by concerned parents and guardians of the victims. Chief Constable of South Yorkshire Police when the majority of criminality occurred - 2004-11 - was Meredydd Hughes.

== Honours ==

Ribbon	Description	Notes
	Order of the British Empire (CBE)	2012
	Queen's Police Medal (QPM)	
	Queen Elizabeth II Diamond Jubilee Medal	
	Police Long Service and Good Conduct Medal	

Police appointments
Preceded by Mike Hedges	Chief Constable of South Yorkshire Police; 2004 – 2011	Succeeded by Robert Dyson (acting)
