= Paul Fletcher (theologian) =

English Roman Catholic theologian (1965-2008)

Paul Fletcher (1965–2008) was an English Roman Catholic philosophical theologian and lecturer.

Fletcher was born and raised in Birkenhead, England, and attended St Hugh's Roman Catholic secondary school. As he was about to escape to a sixth-form place at St Anselm's college, owned and run by the Irish Christian Brothers, he lost his best childhood friend, Dessie, to a drug overdose. He felt the event marked a transition from boy to adult, and announced his intention to become a monk.

In 1988, while still a Christian Brother, he went to study theology at Durham University. He left the order shortly before taking his final vows, disillusioned by the restrictions increasingly placed upon the social work of the Brothers in Liverpool. Later, he returned to Durham University for a Masters in systematic philosophy and subsequently a PhD.

In 1997, he was appointed as a lecturer in religious studies at Lancaster University, where he remained until his death in 2008. Fletcher's influence in modern philosophy has been affirmed by some of the top speakers in British philosophy and his controversial ideas in applied ethics have been cited as having influenced some of the more radical modern philosophical approaches.
