= Paul J. Fletcher =

United States Air Force general

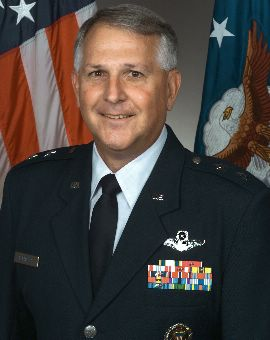
- Official portrait, 2003
- Military career
- Allegiance: United States of America
- Branch: United States Air Force
- Service years: 1974–2007
- Rank: Major General
- Commands: Combat Operations; 435th Tactical Airlift Wing; 37th Tactical Airlift Squadron; 62nd Tactical Airlift; Strategic Planner Operational Plans & Interoperability Directorate (J7) Commandant Combat Aerial; Commander 314th Operations Group; 16th Air Force; 314th Airlift Wing; Plans & Programs Washington D.C. Vice Commander 16th Air Force; Commander 16th Air Force
- Awards: Air Force Distinguished Service Medal with oak leaf cluster Legion of Merit with oak leaf cluster Defense Meritorious Service Medal; Meritorious Service Medal with two oak leaf clusters Air Force Commendation Medal with oak leaf cluster Humanitarian Service Medal

Major General Paul J. Fletcher is a retired senior United States Air Force officer, who served as Vice Commander, 3rd Air Force, from 2006 to 2007. He was commissioned through the Washington State University United States Air Force Reserve Officers' Training Corps program. His experience includes airlift operations; programming; acquisition management; joint planning for modeling and simulation support for training; and standing up the C-130 Weapons Instructor Course. He has commanded at the squadron, group and wing levels, and has flown more than 3,500 hours, primarily in the C-130E.

== Education ==
- 1972 Bachelor of Science degree in civil engineering, Washington State University
- 1976 Squadron Officer School, Maxwell Air Force Base, Alabama
- 1981 Master of Arts degree in logistics management, Central Michigan University
- 1984 Armed Forces Staff College, Norfolk, Virginia
- 1986 National Security Management Course
- 1992 Industrial College of the Armed Forces, Fort Lesley J. McNair, Washington, D.C.
- 2000 Program for Senior Managers in Government, John F. Kennedy School of Government, Harvard University, Cambridge, Massachusetts
- 2002 Joint Flag Officer Warfighting Course, Maxwell AFB, Alabama

== Assignments ==
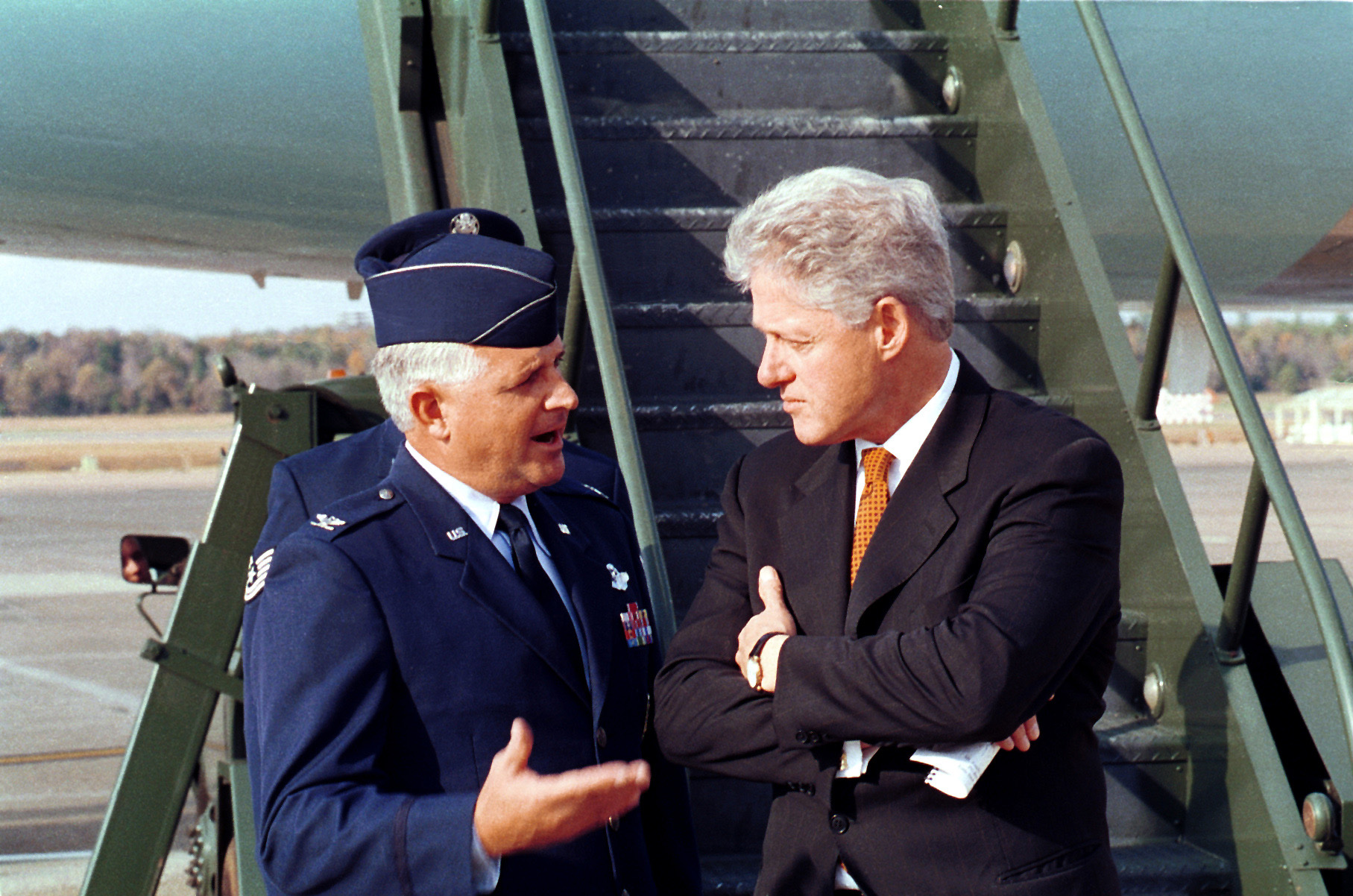
President Bill Clinton talks with Col. Paul Fletcher, USAF, before boarding Air Force One, on November 4, 1999.

- January 1973 - December 1973, student, undergraduate pilot training, Webb AFB, Texas
- December 1973 - May 1974, student, C-130 pilot training, Little Rock AFB, Arkansas
- May 1974 - February 1979, pilot, aircraft commander, instructor and evaluator pilot, 39th Tactical Airlift Squadron, Pope AFB, North Carolina
- February 1979 - January 1984, program manager for C-130 foreign and domestic sales, Aeronautical Systems Division, Wright-Patterson AFB, Ohio
- January 1984 - June 1984, student, Armed Forces Staff College, Norfolk, Virginia
- June 1984 - July 1988, Chief of Combat Operations, 435th Tactical Airlift Wing, later, chief pilot and assistant operations officer, 37th Tactical Airlift Squadron, Rhein-Main Air Base, West Germany
- July 1988 - June 1989, director of operations, 34th Tactical Airlift Training Group, and executive officer, 314th Tactical Airlift Wing, Little Rock AFB, Arkansas
- June 1989 - August 1991, Commander, 62nd Tactical Airlift Squadron, Little Rock AFB, Arkansas
- August 1991 - June 1992, student, Industrial College of the Armed Forces, Fort Lesley J. McNair, Washington, D.C.
- June 1992 - July 1994, strategic planner, Operational Plans and Interoperability Directorate (J7), Office of the Joint Chiefs of Staff, Washington D.C.
- July 1994 - June 1995, Commandant (first), Combat Aerial Delivery School, Little Rock AFB, Arkansas
- June 1995 - January 1997, Commander, 314th Operations Group, Little Rock AFB, Arkansas
- January 1997 - September 1998, deputy director of plans and programs, Headquarters Air Mobility Command, Scott AFB, Illinois
- September 1998 - July 2001, Commander, 314th Airlift Wing, Little Rock AFB, Arkansas
- July 2001 - August 2003, director of plans and programs, Headquarters Pacific Air Forces, Hickam AFB, Hawaii
- September 2003 - October 2005, Assistant Deputy Chief of Staff for Plans and Programs, Headquarters U.S. Air Force, Washington, D.C.
- November 2005 - July 2006, Vice Commander, 16th Air Force, Royal Air Force Mildenhall, England
- July 2006 - December 2006, acting Commander, 16th Air Force, Ramstein Air Base, Germany
- December 2006 - November 2007 (Retired), Vice Commander, 3rd Air Force, RAF Mildenhall, England

== Flight information ==
- Rating: Command Pilot
- Flight hours: More than 3,500
- Aircraft flown: T-37, T-38, C-21 and C-130

== Major awards and decorations ==
- Air Force Distinguished Service Medal (with oak leaf cluster)
- Legion of Merit Legion of Merit (with oak leaf cluster)
- Defense Meritorious Service Medal
- Meritorious Service Medal with (2 olc)
- Air Force Commendation Medal with oak leaf cluster
- Humanitarian Service Medal

== Effective dates of promotion ==
Promotions
Rank	Date
Major General	Nov. 1, 2003 - Nov. 1, 2007 (Retired)
Brigadier General	March 1, 2000 – Nov. 1, 2003
Colonel	Dec. 1, 1993 – March 1, 2000
Lieutenant Colonel	July 1, 1988 – Dec. 1, 1993
Major	Nov. 1, 1983 – July 1, 1988
Captain	Jan 8, 1977 – Nov. 1, 1983
First Lieutenant	Jan 8, 1975 – Jan 8, 1977
Second Lieutenant	Jan 8, 1973 – Jan 8, 1975
