= Shaun Wright =

British politician (born 1968)

South Yorkshire Police and Crime Commissioner
- In office 22 November 2012 – 16 September 2014
- Preceded by: Office created
- Succeeded by: Alan Billings

Personal details
- Born: January 1968 (age 58) Rotherham, South Yorkshire
- Party: Independent (2014-present); Labour (before 2014)

Shaun Wright (born January 1968) is a British politician. He was the South Yorkshire Police and Crime Commissioner from 2012 to 2014. He was the first person to hold the post, to which he was elected as a Labour Party candidate on 15 November 2012. As he held a senior position in child services during the Rotherham child sexual exploitation scandal, he faced continual calls to resign. This resulted in his resignation from the Labour Party on 28 August and from his post on 16 September 2014.

== Political career ==
=== Local government ===
Before becoming the PCC, Wright was a councillor on Rotherham Council. He was in charge of children's services for five years from 2005; he also sat on the Police Authority of South Yorkshire Police.

=== Police and Crime Commissioner ===
Wright was elected to the newly created post of Police and Crime Commissioner (PCC) as the Labour Party candidate on 15 November 2012. This replaced the police authority of which he had been a member. Wright's responsibilities included holding the force to account and setting spending plans, while his powers included the ability to hire and fire chief constables. In November 2013, Wright announced that the police would offer lie detector tests to sex offenders who are on bail or on probation to determine their risk to the public, though the data would not be made available to courts.

=== Child Sexual Abuse Scandal ===
In August 2014 he faced calls to resign from the post of PCC after an inquiry into a massive case (1,400 children and counting) of child sexual exploitation in Rotherham, including from the Labour Party, the Prime Minister and the Home Secretary, Theresa May. After being given an ultimatum by Labour to either resign from his post or face suspension from the party, Wright resigned from the Labour Party on 28 August 2014, retaining his post as South Yorkshire's PCC as an independent. Under current legislation, there is no power of recall for PCCs and the only way they can be removed is if they commit misconduct in public office, or are convicted of an offence with a custodial sentence of two or more years.

Following Wright's refusal to stand down, his deputy, Tracey Cheetham, stated that she could not support him, nor could she continue as his deputy, despite having herself no connection to the Rotherham abuse scandal. On 28 August, she resigned, publicly calling on Wright to do the same. On 3 September 2014, Sheffield City Council unanimously passed a symbolic motion of no confidence in Wright, also calling for his resignation. On 16 September 2014, Wright announced his resignation as Police and Crime Commissioner for South Yorkshire.
