= Humberside Police =

English territorial police force

Agency overview
- Formed: 1 April 1974; 52 years ago
- Preceding agencies: Hull City Police; part of York and North East Yorkshire Police; part of Lincolnshire Constabulary; part of West Yorkshire Constabulary
- Employees: 4,207
- Volunteers: 205
- Annual budget: £217.2 million

Jurisdictional structure
- Operations jurisdiction: East Riding of Yorkshire; North and North East Lincolnshire, England
- Map of Humberside Police's jurisdiction
- Area: 1,357 square miles (3,510 km^{2})
- Population: 932,800
- Legal jurisdiction: England & Wales
- Constituting instrument: Police Act 1996
- General nature: Local civilian police

Operational structure
- Overseen by: His Majesty's Inspectorate of Constabulary and Fire & Rescue Services; Independent Office for Police Conduct
- Headquarters: Kingston upon Hull
- Police officers: 2,388 (of which 115 are special constables)
- Police Community Support Officers: 141
- Police and Crime Commissioner responsible: Jonathan Evison, (C)
- Agency executive: Chris Todd, Chief constable

Facilities
- Stations: 19
- Custody suites: 2

Website
- www.humberside.police.uk

Humberside Police is the territorial police force responsible for policing the unitary authority areas of the East Riding of Yorkshire, Kingston upon Hull, North Lincolnshire and North East Lincolnshire. The four areas correspond to the former county of Humberside.

== History ==
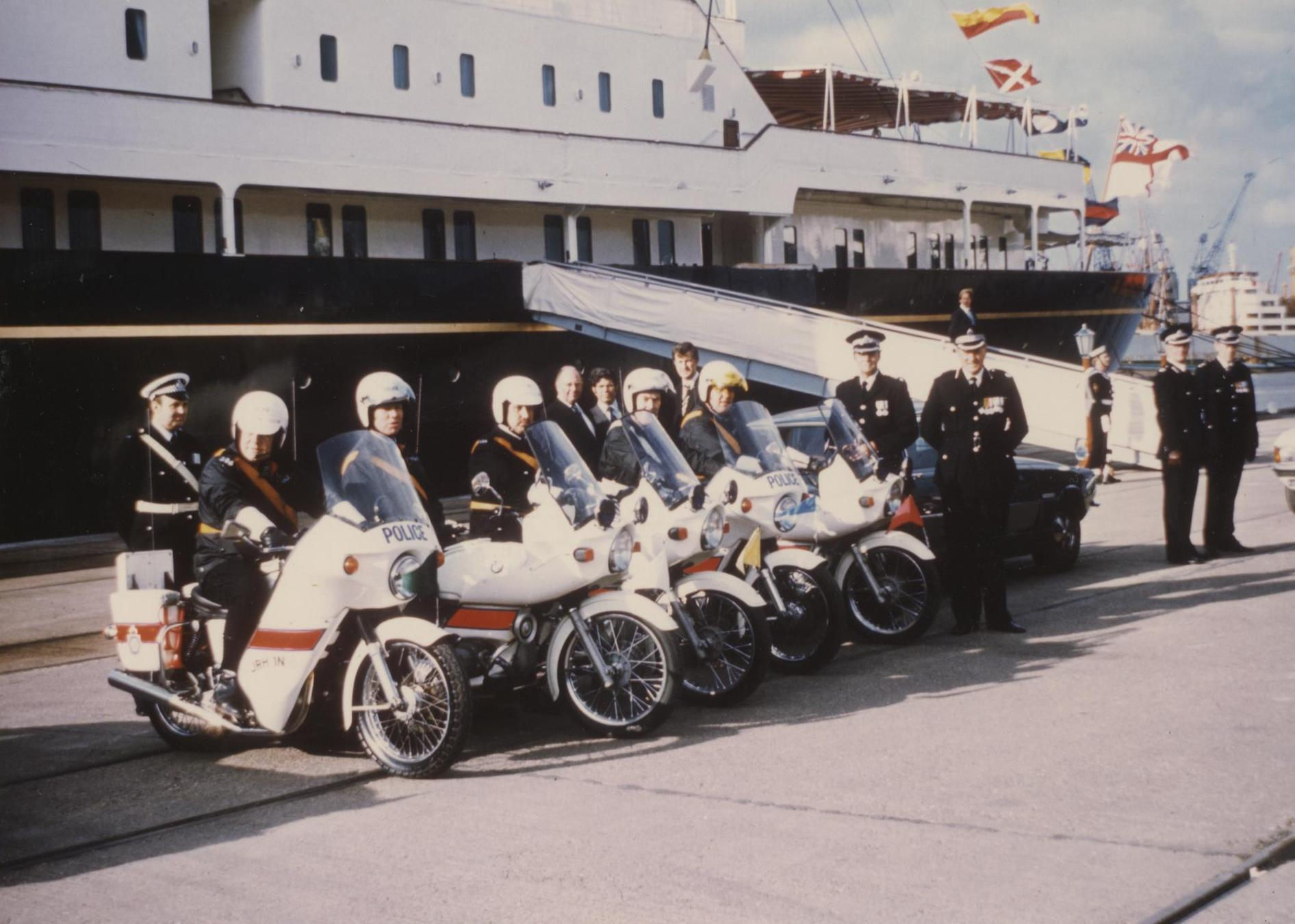
Humberside Police motorcycle officers stationed outside HMY Britannia at the Port of Hull in 1977

Humberside Police was created on 1 April 1974 with a strength of 1,700 officers following a merger of previous forces under the Local Government Act 1972, along with the non-metropolitan county of Humberside. The forces whose area formed Humberside Police were the entirety of Kingston upon Hull City Police, the southern half of York and North East Yorkshire Police, the western tip of West Yorkshire Constabulary and the northern half of Lincolnshire Constabulary.

Following the abolition of Humberside in 1996, the local council members of the Police Authority were appointed by a joint committee of the councils of the East Riding of Yorkshire, Kingston upon Hull, North Lincolnshire, and North East Lincolnshire. On 21 November 2012, the Police Authority was made redundant by the election of the Humberside Police and Crime Commissioner (PCC). The authority, at the time it ceased to exist, had 17 members in total; nine Local Authority Elected members from the area's four unitary authorities and eight independent members.

Proposals made by the Home Secretary on 21 March 2006, would have seen the force merge with North Yorkshire Police, South Yorkshire Police and West Yorkshire Police to form a strategic police force for the entire region. These proposals were later scrapped.

=== Chief constables ===
- 1974–1976: Robert Walton
- 1976–1991: David Hall
- 1991–1999: D. Anthony Leonard
- 1999–2005: David Westwood
- 2005–2013: Timothy Stancliffe Hollis
- 2013–2017: Justine Curran
- 2017–2023: Lee Freeman
- 2023–2024: Paul Anderson
- 2024–2025: Judi Heaton (interim)
- 2025–present: Chris Todd

From March 2013 to February 2017, the chief constable of Humberside Police was Justine Curran, previously chief constable of Tayside Police in Scotland before the introduction of the national Police Scotland service on 1 April 2013. Her appointment was unanimously approved by the Humberside Police and Crime panel after PCC Matthew Grove, proposed her for the post. Curran took over the position from Tim Hollis, who retired from the service in March 2013.

On 11 November 2015, it was revealed that Curran had claimed for more than £39,000 in expenses for her relocation from Tayside to Humberside in March 2013.

After Keith Hunter was elected as PCC in May 2016, Curran was given six months to improve the force after it was rated inadequate by Her Majesty's Inspectorate of Constabulary (HMIC). Nine months later, after a further HMIC inspection which identified further "significant failings", Hunter asked Curran to consider her position, and she announced her retirement. She left on 20 February 2017, 18 months before she had been due to retire.

In August 2017, it was revealed that Hunter had "lost confidence" in Curran and was "completely undermined" by her when it was decided to withhold the findings of an HMIC investigation which revealed further inadequacies within the force. Hunter sought legal advice, and Curran was allowed to retire before the statutory procedure to remove a chief constable was started.

Lee Freeman, a former assistant chief constable in Lincolnshire from August 2013 who had joined Humberside in May 2015, took over as deputy chief constable on Curran's departure. He was appointed temporary chief constable in May 2017 and the position was made permanent on 26 June 2017.

Freeman implemented a callout system named 'Right Care, Right Person' (RCRP) in May 2020, in which Humberside officers would only attend mental health-related callouts deemed 'essential' and instead have other callouts responded to by medical services. As of May 2023, Freeman claims that Humberside has achieved more arrests per 1,000 people in the population under RCRP while still attending 25% of mental health callouts, with officers having attended 508 fewer callouts per month. RCRP is planned to be copied by the Metropolitan Police and other police forces in England and Wales.

In August 2023 Paul Anderson, previously the Assistant Chief Constable under Freeman, took over as Chief Constable of Humberside Police. In June 2024, Anderson announced his intention to retire, with Judi Heaton appointed as interim Chief Constable for six months the following July. In November 2024, Anderson was under investigation by the Independent Office for Police Conduct for allegations of gross misconduct in regards to 'unprofessional behaviour, discriminatory, insensitive and offensive comments', as well as a separate allegation of interference with the outcome of a disciplinary matter.

In March 2025 Chris Todd was appointed as the new chief constable who would take up the position on 7 April 2025.

=== Officers killed in the line of duty ===
The Police Roll of Honour Trust and Police Memorial Trust list and commemorate all British police officers killed in the line of duty. Since its establishment in 1984, the Police Memorial Trust has erected 50 memorials nationally to some of those officers.

Since the formation of Humberside Police six officers have been killed in the line of duty, these officers are:

- September 1979 – Police Constable, Linton Andee Le Blanc, 19, killed when his patrol car crashed on Hedon Road in Kingston upon Hull while responding to a burglar alarm call
- January 1998 – Police Constable Steven Stimpson, 33, accidentally killed when his Volvo T5 traffic patrol car left the A1035 road near Tickton and overturned
- August 1998 – Police Constable James Heaton, 30, fatally injured when his Volvo T5 traffic car left the A1079 road near Beverley and overturned while responding to an accident
- September 1998 – Police Constable Jonathan Templeton, 37, collapsed and died of heart failure whilst on duty at Hedon police station
- July 2003 – Police Constable Robert Douglas, 44, killed in a road traffic accident returning from his duties at the airport
- April 2015 – Police Constable Russell Wylie, 28, during the morning of Monday 13 April 2015 he was on routine motorcycle patrol when he was involved in a collision with a car on the B1362, Burstwick, East Riding of Yorkshire. He was airlifted to Hull Royal Infirmary, however his injuries proved to be fatal. He was a traffic officer based at Melton.

=== Notable incidents and investigations ===
Notable major incidents and investigations in which Humberside Police have been involved in include:

- July 2001-2006: Humberside Police launched a major investigation into child sexual abuse at St Williams School in Market Weighton. The largest investigation in Humberside Police history, with hundreds of complainants, led to the Principal of the home, James Carragher, being convicted of sexual offences and sentenced to 14 years imprisonment.
- July 2010: Northumbria Police manhunt: Humberside Police was involved in the major police manhunt for Raoul Moat who, upon release from prison, shot his ex-girlfriend's new partner, his ex-girlfriend and the then serving traffic police Officer, PC David Rathband. Humberside Police, along with other police forces, provided mutual aid to Northumbria Police by providing armed police officer to assist in the armed police coverage and search for Raoul Moat.
- August 2011: 2011 England Riots: Specially trained officers were sent to assist the Metropolitan Police as riots broke out across the London area, which later spread across the country. Over 50 officers travelled to London to assist the Met Police.
- October 2012: Jimmy Savile sexual abuse scandal: following posthumous revelations of sexual abuse by media personality Jimmy Savile, Humberside Police investigated alleged sexual offences by Savile at De la Pole Hospital in Willerby in the 1970s, in conjunction with the Met Police-led Operation Yewtree.
- February 2019: Murder of Libby Squire: On 1 February 2019, Humberside police launched a major search for missing Hull University student Libby Squire. Appeals were made on social media and a large police presence was focused around the Beverley Road area of Hull. Humberside Police arrested a man on suspicion of abduction a few days later and charged him with several unrelated offences. He was released under investigation in connection to Libby Squire. Seven weeks later, the body of Libby Squire was discovered in the Humber Estuary, over 30 miles from her last known location in Hull. On 24 October 2019, police charged 25 year old Pawel Relowicz for the rape and murder of Libby Squire. On 10 February 2021, Pawel Relowicz was found guilty of rape and murder.
- March 2024–July 2026: Legacy Independent Funeral Directors inquiry: On 6 March 2024, Humberside Police officers were called to three branches of Legacy Independent Funeral Directors in Hull and Beverley on a report for 'concern for care of the deceased'. The largest investigation ever held by Humberside Police saw forensic officers find 35 bodies as well as a quantity of ashes at Legacy's site on Hessle Road, resulting in two arrests for preventing the lawful burial of a body and for fraud. The force set up an inquiry into the funeral directors and established a helpline for affected families, later presenting the Crown Prosecution Service with a file of 13,000 exhibits from the inquiry to consider using as evidence, and on 2 April 2025, the CPS charged Robert Bush with 30 counts of preventing the lawful burial of a body, 36 counts of fraud by false representation and one count of theft from twelve charities. On 15 October 2025, Bush pled guilty to the charges of fraud by false representation, and on 2 April 2026, Bush changed his pleas for preventing the lawful burial of a body and for theft to guilty. Bush was sentenced to 20 years in prison on a total of 67 individual counts on 31 July 2026.
- August 2024: 2024 United Kingdom riots: Eleven Humberside officers were injured amid rioting in Hull City Centre on 3 August 2024 at a protest in response to the 2024 Southport stabbing. Windows were broken at the Royal Hotel, adjacent to Hull Paragon Interchange and used to house asylum seekers, city centre shops were attacked and looted, and fires were set by rioters in both the city centre and on Spring Bank. Officers later claimed they were unprepared and sent to the scene with 'little support' from senior leadership, with chief officers not present during the weekend of the riot and injured officers taken to hospitals in personal vehicles. Twenty-five arrests were made by Humberside officers on 3 August, and as of 13 August 2024, 61 arrests had been made in connection to the disorder.
- March 2025: 2025 North Sea ship collision: Following a collision on 10 March 2025 between container ship MV Solong and the oil tanker MV Stena Immaculate, which was at anchor in the North Sea off the coast of Spurn Point, resulting in both ships catching fire, one crew member being hospitalised and another reported missing, presumed dead, Humberside Police arrested the captain of the Solong, a Russian national, in Grimsby on suspicion of gross negligence manslaughter on 11 March. A criminal investigation into the cause of the collision was subsequently opened in cooperation with the Maritime and Coastguard Agency.

Notable incidents and investigations involving Humberside officers include:

- The 1998 death of Christopher Alder, a black man who was unlawfully killed while in the custody of Humberside Police, led to an investigation by the Independent Police Complaints Commission and a subsequent apology by the government in the European Court of Human Rights, admitting that it had failed to meet its obligations regarding preservation of life and ensuring no person is subjected to "inhuman or degrading treatment". Five Humberside Police officers were charged with manslaughter and misconduct in public office but the trial collapsed and the judge ordered the jury to find the officers not guilty on all charges.
- In mid-2004, the force refused to dismiss Chief Constable David Westwood despite instructions from the then Home Secretary, David Blunkett. The Home Secretary eventually obtained a court order suspending Westwood. The force had come under pressure to dismiss Westwood when the Soham Inquiry apportioned part of the blame to Humberside Police for not properly informing the authorities of Grimsby-born Ian Huntley, who was known to Humberside Police and local social services, after reports of nine sexual offences of which Huntley had been suspected, and also an alleged burglary. In only one of the sex offence investigations was Huntley charged (with rape) and remanded in custody, but the case was dropped due to insufficient evidence, and his burglary case was left on file. Huntley was not convicted of any crime (his only actual conviction was for a minor motoring offence in 1993), and Humberside Police did not adequately inform the authorities in Cambridgeshire about Huntley when he moved to Soham to work as a school caretaker. He was found guilty of murdering two 10-year-old girls (Holly Wells and Jessica Chapman) in 2003. This led to the Bichard enquiry for the police force and the Kelly report for the local council (North East Lincolnshire Council).
- In 2005, Colin Inglis, its chairman at the time of the previous crisis, appeared in court charged with indecent assaults against children dating back to the 1980s. Inglis was cleared of all charges in July 2006.
- In January 2015, former Detective Chief Superintendent Colin Andrews was convicted of common assault, harassment, stalking, and witness intimidation. Court testimony revealed that other senior officers in Humberside Police questioned whether an investigation into Andrews' conduct should have gone ahead, concerned by "the 'dirt' he might throw" and the damage caused to the force's reputation. One victim, a police inspector, expressed fear of a Goole-based "mafia" of senior officers that included Andrews.
- In November 2015, a sergeant with 27 years' service was dismissed after kicking a 16-year-old boy in the head following a chase. Sergeant John Stevenson was involved in one of the most high-profile cases in Humberside Police's recent history when he arrested his own boss, Colin Andrews, who was found guilty of stalking, harassment and assault in January. Many speculated that the sergeant was used as a scapegoat.
- Former police officer, Harry Miller, was questioned over the telephone in January 2019 by a Humberside Police constable for 34 minutes after being reported for a non-crime "hate incident" for liking and making Twitter posts that were considered transphobic. The High Court ruled in 2020 that the questioning was unlawful and represented a "disproportionate interference" with Miller's right to freedom of expression.
- Former constable Daniel Whitehead, who resigned from the force in January, was found guilty of gross misconduct at a Humberside Police Misconduct Board hearing in February 2023 at Goole Magistrates Court and was permanently barred nationwide from working for the police. Whitehead had posted content considered inappropriate, grossly offensive and sexually explicit on social media profiles that identified him as a Humberside police officer between September 2021 and March 2022, despite being repeatedly told to stop doing so by his supervisors, and an internal investigation by Humberside Police was triggered when he disclosed his personal information to colleagues and showed them a picture of a naked man on his phone around September or October 2022.

== Operations ==
=== Custody suites ===
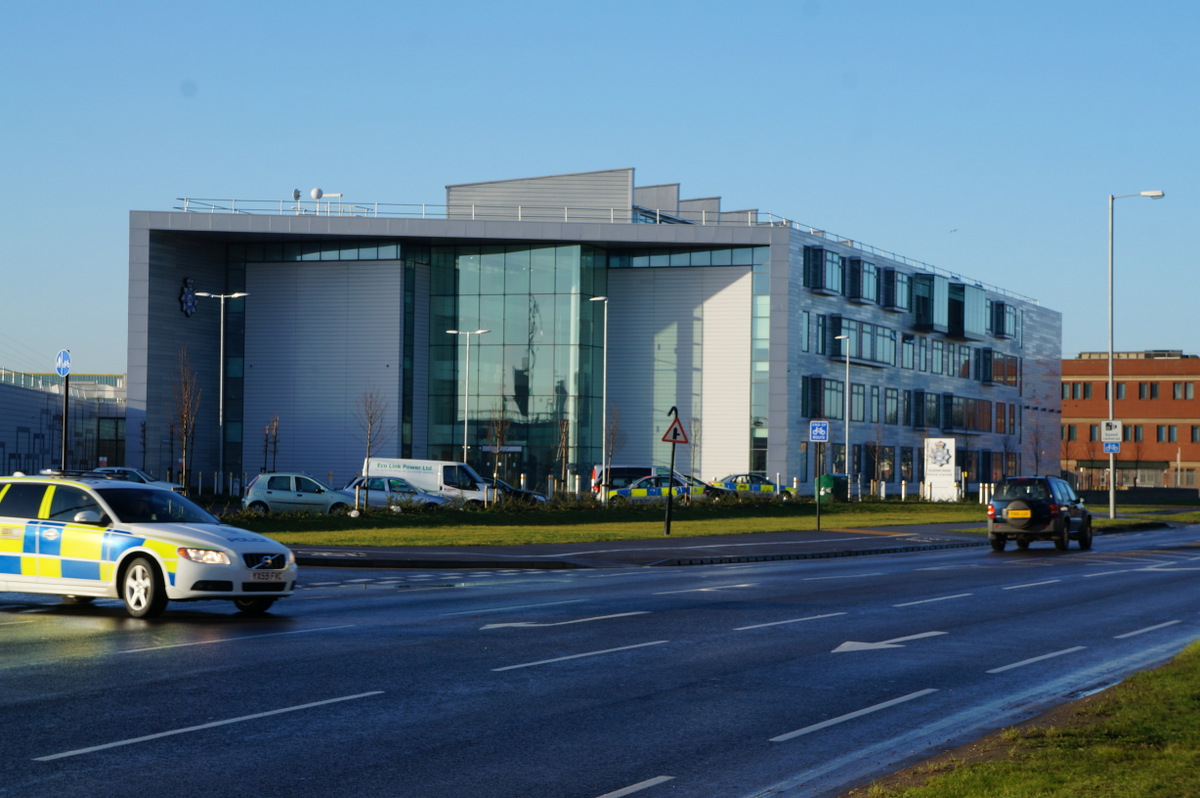
The Clough Road police station and custody suite in Newland, Kingston upon Hull

Humberside Police has two custody suites in Hull and Grimsby that operate 24/7 and hold prisoners who have been arrested by officers in the force. A 40-cell custody suite is located at Clough Road police station in Hull, opened in 2013 as part of a £32 million replacement for the Queens Gardens police station in the city centre, while prisoners on the south bank of the Humber are held in a £14 million 36-cell custody suite at Birchin Way in Grimsby, which opened in March 2019 to replace custody suites in Grimsby and Scunthorpe. The Birchin Way custody suite includes a secure holding bay for arriving prisoners, CCTV monitoring throughout, on-site medical facilities and a special 'orange' holding cell for vulnerable prisoners.

=== Vehicle fleet ===
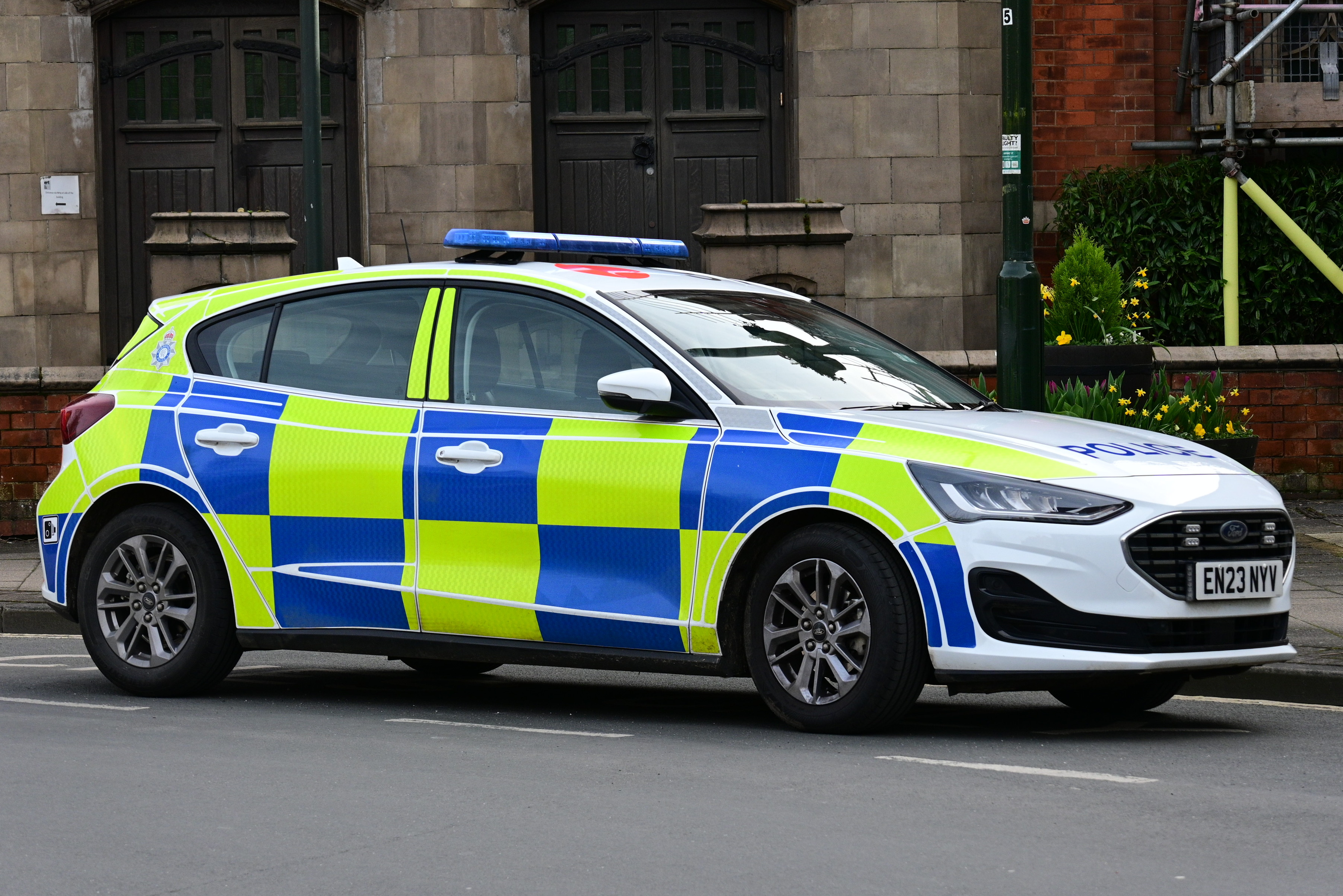
A Humberside Police Ford Focus patrol vehicle in Beverley in March 2024

Humberside uses a wide variety of vehicles, including both marked and unmarked police vehicles. The force is one of many police forces across the United Kingdom to merge its maintenance operations with the area fire service, forming Emergency Services Fleet Management (Humberside) in partnership with the Humberside Fire and Rescue Service in 2015. Joint maintenance operations are based at a single workshop in Melton.

In September 1994, in response to a rise in vehicle crime within the force's operating area, especially concentrated in Hull, Humberside Police founded the Vehicle Crime Unit. The unit was initially formed with six traffic officers as well as the dogs of the force's Dog Section, and made use of a modified Ford Escort RS Cosworth equipped with an in-car video camera as well as a converted Vauxhall Senator dog carrier for traffic pursuits. The Escort Cosworth, as well as a Volvo 850 T5, were both replaced by two Subaru Impreza Turbos in June 1998, while the Senator was replaced by a Vauxhall Omega around the same period.

Throughout the 2000s, Humberside Police standardised on the Volvo V70 for their traffic fleet, as well as in other force operations. High-performance traffic vehicles acquired for the force's Road Crime Unit in this period included three Subaru Imprezas, a pair of Mitsubishi Lancer Evolution X and a Lexus IS-F.

From 1997 until the early 2010s, Humberside Police operated a majority of its fleet vehicles on liquefied petroleum gas fuel, with some supplied as bi-fuel vehicles, in order to cut costs on fuelling the fleet. The first fleet vehicles supplied with LPG fuel were two converted Vauxhall Astras, supplied in March 1997 as part of a three-year trial in a partnership between Calor Gas, the Energy Saving Trust and Vauxhall Motors. A majority of vehicles later supplied with LPG fuelling systems included the Proton Persona and the later Proton Impian and GEN•2, most for use as general purpose fleet vehicles.

==== Aviation ====
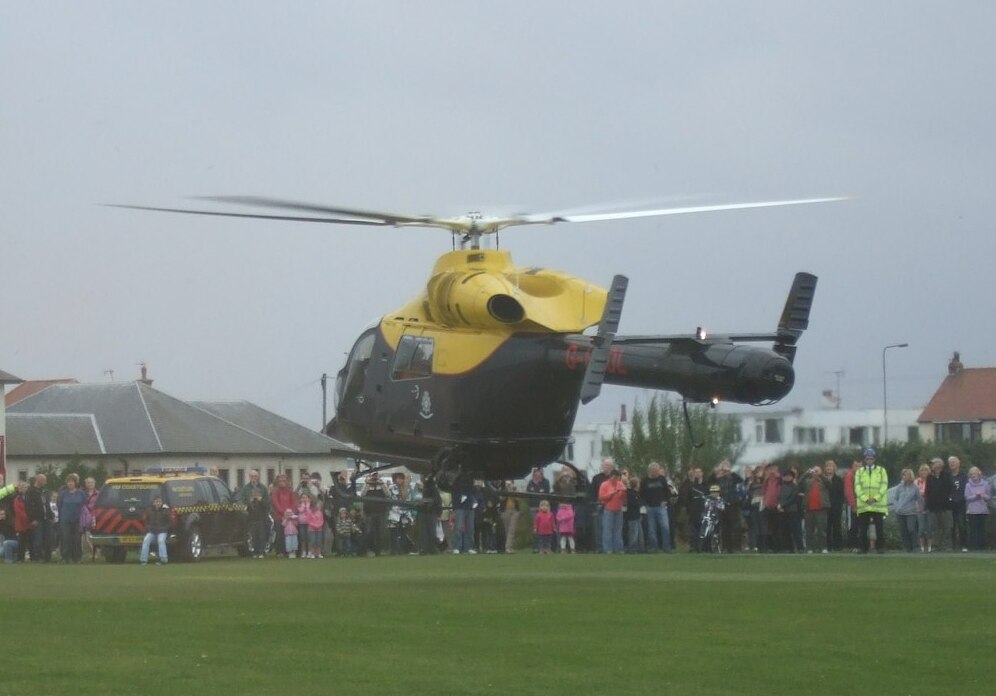
Humberside's 'Oscar 99' helicopter at Sewerby Hall, Bridlington in September 2011

Humberside Police first acquired a police helicopter in August 1996, purchasing a used MBB Bo 105 from the Norwegian Air Ambulance Service. The helicopter, later codenamed Oscar 99, was equipped with a thermal image camera and conventional video camera, a radio system giving access to emergency service frequencies, and as part of its previous air ambulance use, a stretcher for hospital patient transport. Oscar 99 became operational from its base at RAF Leconfield on 26 December 1996, first used to help locate a care home resident reported missing from an Appleby care home.

In 2001, Humberside Police acquired a McDonnell Douglas MD 902 Explorer to replace the Eurocopter. Around this time, Oscar 99 was moved from RAF Leconfield to be based at Humberside Airport.

Humberside's helicopter operations were taken over by the National Police Air Service (NPAS) on 27 September 2016, making the force the last in England and Wales to operate its own helicopter independently. Humberside Police and Crime Commissioner Matthew Grove was initially reluctant to hand over Oscar 99 to NPAS after the service had proposed cutting ten of its helicopter bases, stating in September 2015 that while the force would work towards joining NPAS the following September, NPAS must both provide "satisfactory" air cover for residents of the Humberside area and be "appropriate and affordable" for the taxpayer as a replacement for Oscar 99. An agreement for Humberside to join NPAS was eventually signed in May 2016; police air cover in the Humberside area is now provided through fixed-wing Vulcanair P-68C aircraft based at Leeds Bradford Airport.

=== Mounted unit ===
Until 2013, Humberside Police maintained a mounted police unit latterly consisting of six horses based at stables in Walkington. The mounted section was disbanded in July 2013 in order to save £500,000 per year amid budget cuts to the force, with the unit reported to have been deployed only 27 times during 2012. Five of the six horses were sold to other police forces in the United Kingdom following the unit's disbandment, and the Walkington stables were later sold to a private buyer in August 2015.

In August 2025, Humberside Police launched a scheme employing ten horse riders as 'community safety volunteers', working alongside rural crime officers in the East Riding of Yorkshire and patrolling isolated areas of the county not easily accessed by officers in a car or on foot. It is planned for another team of volunteers to be launched in Lincolnshire by the force during 2026.

== Performance ==
The force underperformed for a number of years. In October 2006 it was named as the worst-performing police force in the country (jointly with Northamptonshire Police), based on data released from the Home Office

In 2007 the force moved off the bottom of the unofficial league table thanks to "major improvements" in performance, according to the Home Office.

Performance continued to improve, with a 20% reduction in total recorded crime as at March 2009. Recorded vehicle crime was down 39%, domestic burglary was down 12%, and robbery was down 36%. Home Office figures published in July 2009 showed that from 2007/08 to 2008/09, Humberside Police had the second highest increase of all forces in England and Wales in the percentage of British Crime Survey respondents who said that their local police do an excellent or good job.

After inspections by Her Majesty's Inspectorate of Constabulary (HMIC) between April and August 2009, their report identified Humberside Police as one of the top eight forces in the country.

In April 2009 the force was cited as the poorest performing force for completing Criminal Record Bureau (CRB) checks. The Home Office requirement is for 95% of requests to be completed within 14 days; Humberside Police completed just 15%. As such checks are often a condition of employment, this failure caused delays for those waiting to start work.

Graham Stuart, MP for Beverley and Holderness, said he was disgusted with this failure. He said, "The delay in processing them stops people taking up work and has a crippling impact on voluntary groups who have to get their volunteers approved. The Humberside Police are seriously lagging behind virtually every other constabulary in the country and local people are being let down."

In October 2015, it was revealed that officer morale in the force was the lowest in the country, with 84.5% of officers saying that their morale was currently low, compared to 70.2% nationally.

On 19 October 2015, in a report published by HMIC, Humberside Police was the only force in the country classed as inadequate. The report suggested that the force had a "limited understanding" of demand for its services, and raised "serious concerns" over the way it was organised. HM Inspector of Constabulary Mike Cunningham said: "Humberside Police has a limited understanding of the current and future demand for its services and, as it is unable to fully match resources to demand in some important areas, this affects its ability to provide a good service to the public." Chief Constable Justine Curran said the force had "moved on" since then.

Similarly, the Independent Police Complaints Commission (IPCC) released its annual statistics of police complaints from forces throughout the country: Humberside Police performed better than average in many areas; e.g. the number of complaints had decreased by 4% compared to an increase of 6% nationally. But the number of appeals by dissatisfied complainants had increased by 24%: three times the national average.

In November 2015, it was revealed that thousands of telephone calls to the 101 service were being abandoned; the problem had reached its peak in June 2015 when over 11,000 calls were abandoned.

On 19 November 2015 the East Riding of Yorkshire Council agreed to reconvene a panel to review the force after October's HMIC inspection. The panel ended up criticising both police and crime commissioner Matthew Grove and chief constable Justine Curran for refusing to attend one of its meetings. This had led the council to write a critical letter to the parliamentary committee for standards in public life, highlighting concerns over a lack of proper consultation over the reorganisation. Speaking at the full council meeting, Cllr. Owen said the panel's concerns had been vindicated by the HMIC report. He said "all public sector bodies are facing huge financial pressures and I fully appreciate the pressures we all face, and Humberside Police are no different, recovering from a number of years of having to improve performance in a climate of low funding and other pressures.

In June 2018, 12 months after Curran's departure, Humberside Police were formally disengaged by His Majesty's Inspectorate of Constabulary and Fire and Rescue Services (HMICFRS) and assessed as sufficiently improved and stable to be removed from what were in effect "special measures"

In August 2018, in the annual Police Federation Pay and Morale Survey, Humberside were officially recorded as the most improved police force in the country in terms of police officers' reported levels of personal morale. The survey placed the force 3rd out of 43 forces across England and Wales; the previous year the results were reported locally as Humberside having the lowest morale in the country.

=== PEEL inspection ===
His Majesty's Inspectorate of Constabulary and Fire & Rescue Services (HMICFRS) conducts a periodic police effectiveness, efficiency and legitimacy (PEEL) inspection of each police service's performance. In November 2022, the force was awarded six outstanding and two good grades in its PEEL inspection, the best in the UK at that time. It was rated as follows:

	Outstanding	Good	Adequate	Requires Improvement	Inadequate
2021/22 rating	Preventing crime; Treatment of the public; Protecting vulnerable people; Managing offenders; Developing a positive workplace; Good use of resources	Investigating crime; Responding to the public	Recording data about crime		

== Police and crime commissioner (PCC) ==
On Thursday 15 November 2012, the electorate of Humberside voted for the Humberside Police and Crime Commissioner for the Humberside Police; as did the rest of the people of England and Wales, except the Metropolitan Police area, to vote for a PCC in their respective police services. Following the poll Matthew Grove was elected as the new police and crime commissioner. When the commissioner took up office, the existing Police Authority was abolished.

On 6 May 2016, Labour's Keith Hunter was elected as PCC, receiving over 76,128 votes in total during the second round, compared to Grove's 51,757.

Following elections in 2021, Conservative Jonathan Evison, a replacement candidate for Craig Ulliott, was elected as Humberside's new PCC, winning with a margin of 2,919 votes. Evison was re-elected to the post in 2024 with a widened margin of 4,237 votes compared to Labour candidate Simon O'Rourke.

== Documentaries ==
=== The Lock Up ===
Humberside Police participated in a documentary series named The Lock Up, where cameras followed Police and Custody officers in their work at the Custody Suite at Humberside Police Headquarters on Priory Road, Cottingham, East Riding of Yorkshire.

The documentary has had 2 series, the first aired on BBC Three which started showing on 4 February 2011 consisting of 8 episodes where cameras rolled 24/7; the second series was aired primarily on the main BBC Channel, BBC One.

=== Neighbourhood Blues ===
Humberside Police have also participated in the second series of Neighbourhood Blues, that covered the work of the forces Neighbourhood Policing Teams. This was aired on weekday mornings for two weeks starting on 12 November 2012, on BBC One.

=== Hotel Custody ===
Humberside Police participated in the ITV documentary series Hotel Custody, which in three episodes, from 28 August 2022, covered the operation of the Birchin Way custody facility in Grimsby, aiming to show the facility's method of treating remanded detainees as "customers rather than criminals".

== See also ==
- Law enforcement in the United Kingdom
- List of law enforcement agencies in the United Kingdom, Crown Dependencies and British Overseas Territories
- National Police Air Service
