= Lee Freeman =

British police officer

Lee Freeman KPM

Chief Constable of Humberside Police
- In office 26 June 2017 – 31 July 2023
- Deputy: Paul Anderson
- Preceded by: Justine Curran
- PCC: Jon Evison

Temporary Deputy Chief Constable of Humberside Police
- In office February 2017 – 26 June 2017

Personal details
- Born: 1969 (age 56–57) Grimsby
- Website: Official website

Lee Freeman is a retired British police officer who served as chief constable of Humberside Police until July 2023.

Under the leadership of Freeman, Humberside Police improved from being the lowest performing force in the country, to the highest rated in 2022, receiving six outstanding and two good grades in their HMICFRS PEEL inspection.

During this time, the force were also awarded the gold medal at the annual Public Sector Transformation Awards category "UK Police Force of the Year" in both 2022 & 2023.

On 1 August 2023, Lee Freeman retired as the chief constable of Humberside Police and was subsequently appointed as His Majesty's Inspector of Constabulary and Fire and Rescue Services.

== Career ==
Freeman joined the City of London Police in 1993, transferring to Lincolnshire Police in 1996. Having applied for the Accelerated Promotion Course in 1999 whilst still a Constable, Freeman was successful and promoted to sergeant in September 2000. Remaining in Lincolnshire, he gained promotion to inspector, chief inspector and then to superintendent in 2005. A spell as an assistant director at Lincolnshire County Council preceded his promotion to chief superintendent as the divisional commander for South Division in 2010, with further spells as the divisional commander for West Division and also the head of local policing following a major force restructure.

In August 2013, he stepped up to assistant chief constable (local policing) in Lincolnshire for 18 months. In 2015, Freeman successfully applied for the vacant assistant chief constable post in Humberside Police. He stepped up to the role of temporary deputy chief constable in February 2017, after the previous chief constable, Justine Curran, retired early when she was advised to consider her position by the Humberside police and crime commissioner, Keith Hunter. Freeman applied for the subsequent vacant chief constable job and was duly successful and started as the new chief constable in June 2017.

In January 2019, Freeman was approached and subsequently agreed to assist Cleveland Police, and was effectively parachuted in to temporarily lead Cleveland Police. The four month secondment arose due to the sudden resignation of Chief Constable Mike Veale.

Freeman was awarded the King's Police Medal (KPM) in the 2023 New Year Honours.

On 27 April 2023, after six years at the helm, Lee Freeman announced that he would be stepping down as chief constable on 31 July 2023.

This announcement followed his appointment as His Majesty's Inspector of Constabulary and Fire & Rescue Services.

== Personal life ==
Freeman was born in Grimsby, Lincolnshire. He is married with one son. Before joining the police service, he attended Kingston Polytechnic where he gained a BSc (Hons) in Sociology.

Police appointments
| Preceded by Justine Curran | Chief Constable of Humberside Police; 2017– | Incumbent |
