= 24 Hours in Police Custody =

British documentary television series

- Genre: Crime; Documentary
- Narrated by: Zawe Ashton (2014–2019); Royce Pierreson (2020–)
- Country of origin: United Kingdom
- Original language: English
- No. of series: 11
- No. of episodes: 102

Production
- Executive producers: Simon Ford, Flavia Taylor, Zac Beattie, Amber Ronowicz, Jermaine Blake.
- Production locations: Luton, Bedfordshire & Cambridge, Cambridgeshire
- Running time: 60 minutes (inc. adverts); 90 minutes (feature special inc. adverts)
- Production company: The Garden

Original release
- Network: Channel 4
- Release: 29 September 2014 – present

24 Hours in Police Custody is a British television documentary series shown on Channel 4. It primarily follows Bedfordshire Police as they investigate cases in Luton. The programme is made by The Garden; the same production company that makes 24 Hours in A&E.

Most episodes follow an individual case. The title refers to the fact that police may only hold suspects in custody for 24 hours before either having to release them, bring charges or apply for an extension to this time in the case of serious crimes, such as murder.

The first series of seven episodes aired in late 2014. Filming took place at Luton Police Station over a six-week period using more than 80 cameras. Channel 4 commissioned further series, with the second airing in early 2015. A few episodes have taken place wholly or partly elsewhere in Bedfordshire, Cambridgeshire and Hertfordshire. Series 10 began broadcasting on 22 March 2021.

== Episodes ==
=== Series 1 ===
No.	Title	Original release date	Viewers (millions)
1	"The Conspiracy to Murder"	29 September 2014	2.05
This episode opens with the dawn arrest of a man on suspicion of conspiracy to murder. The film documents the work of the lead detectives as they investigate and interview the suspect.
2	"Love Hurts"	6 October 2014	2.06
In this second episode of the observational series shot inside Luton Police Station, two PCs are determined to get to the bottom of two contrasting cases of domestic abuse and harassment.
3	"The Confession of a Paedophile"	13 October 2014	2.02
This episode follows the team of four detectives working full-time on child abuse cases in the dedicated Safeguarding Investigation Unit at Luton Police Station.
4	"Drug Drop"	20 October 2014	No data
This episode opens with a young man accidentally dropping a large quantity of cocaine from his jacket pocket outside a petrol station - all caught on CCTV. In a separate case, a man is arrested for stealing meat from Marks & Spencer. He is a heroin addict who admits theft whilst being interviewed by police and is later convicted.
5	"The Morning After"	27 October 2014	1.98
A private carer is arrested for assaulting the elderly man he is paid a carer's allowance to look after, in his house, where they both live. In a separate case, a Polish man is arrested for disturbing the peace and at the police station it is discovered that he threatened to kill his wife during a row with her. Proceedings were abandoned in both cases.
6	"Honour Thy Father"	10 November 2014	2.04
A Muslim Pakistani man is suspected of committing an honour crime against his 26-year-old daughter after she married an illegal immigrant. She said that her father beat her with an iron and tried to force her to leave her husband and move back in with her family. The father said her husband only married her to gain British citizenship. The father was charged with kidnapping, assault occasioning actual bodily harm and common assault. He was convicted of ABH and sentenced to 3 years imprisonment. The other two charges had been dropped.
7	"The Crime of the Century"	17 November 2014	1.35
Acting sergeant and double amputee Wil Taylor and his team investigate the case of three prostitutes. Are the women victims of trafficking, or are they exploiting others? A man is arrested for an immigration offence and handling stolen goods; he is deported.

=== Series 2 ===
No.	Title	Original release date	Viewers (millions)
1	"A Crime of Passion"	6 January 2015	1.51
A man stabs his wife in the eye - she turns her face quickly after, causing the blade to cut across her face instead of going into her brain. Straight after, he slashes his own arm. He was convicted of attempted murder and sentenced to 11 years in prison.
2	"A Short, Sharp Shock"	13 January 2015	1.60
Two teenage girls are arrested after a fight broke out in a nightclub. The police also arrest a 61-year-old man who has never spent a night in the cells before.
3	"Human Traffic"	20 January 2015	1.51
This episode follows an investigation into suspected human trafficking. DC Tom Stean says 'Human trafficking is getting worse and worse. I think Luton is a magnet.'
4	"Punchdrunk Love"	27 January 2015	1.41
Three men are arrested for separate domestic violence incidents. One is not charged, one is cautioned and the other is sent to prison for three months.
5	"Age Concern"	3 February 2015	1.35
Three separate cases of young men who have committed crimes against the elderly. One is detained indefinitely under the Mental Health Act after he committed a series of sexual assaults. Another is sent to prison for hitting his grandmother and another is sent to prison for harassment and criminal damage against a relative.
6	"Frequent Flyers"	10 February 2015	1.74
One of Luton's most prolific burglars.

=== Series 3 ===
No.	Title	Original release date	Viewers (millions)
1	"Bad Blood"	27 July 2015	1.80
An outbreak of teen criminality puts DS Emma James and DC Cathie Layton on a 22-hour shift to find the evidence against a young man accused of robbery and assault. He denies it all and paints himself as the victim. Will they find enough to charge him, or will he be released?
2	"Guilty Little Secrets"	3 August 2015	2.30
Bedfordshire Police must decide whether to charge two men arrested as part of a nationwide operation against people possessing and, in some cases, distributing indecent images of children, via the internet.
3	"Partners in Crime"	10 August 2015	2.04
A series of robberies at knife-point lead the robbery squad in Luton to two men who they suspect may be behind the crimes. DS Simon Hancock and DC Cathie Layton have 24 hours to link them to the crimes via the getaway car. And neither man knows what the other's saying...
4	"Mother's Pride"	17 August 2015	1.86
It's Mother's Day and the police release a young man from custody after giving his mother as an alibi. But when she fails to support his story, they have to try to find him again...
5	"A Sixth Sense"	24 August 2015	1.75
DC Cathie Layton investigates the case of a man who is alleged to have assaulted a taxi driver and stolen his keys. But her instinct tells her that all is not what it seems...

=== Series 4 ===
No.	Title	Original release date	Viewers (millions)
1	"Human Cargo"	20 April 2016	1.94
The driver of a refrigerated lorry hears noises from the back of the truck, which he opens and finds illegal immigrants. He is arrested and questioned, but he is not charged with any offence.
2	"To Catch a Paedophile"	27 April 2016	1.77
Vigilante paedophile hunters trap two white British men by pretending on Internet sites to be underage girls. Both men were sent to prison.
3	"Love Thy Neighbour"	5 May 2016	1.94
Three cases are featured. A white British mother and son are arrested for public order offences after shouting at their neighbour; she was fined for disorderly conduct; he was cautioned for threatening behaviour. They both moved away from Luton. A Bangladeshi woman escaped from her husband, who is an Islamic State supporter who tried to force her to go to Syria; she moved to a hotel, and later to a refuge. Tommy Robinson is arrested for assaulting an inmate when they were both in Peterborough Prison - the case against him is dismissed.
4	"One Punch"	12 May 2016	2.30
Police investigate a man who killed another man with a single punch outside a nightclub, attempting to establish if he was the aggressor or acted in self-defence. The attacker was convicted of manslaughter.
5	"The Black Balaclava"	19 May 2016	2.09
Police investigate a series of armed robberies all involving the victims being threatened at knifepoint. Two men are convicted of and imprisoned for the robberies: one is sentenced to seven years, the other to twelve years.
6	"Home Truths"	26 May 2016	1.60
The number of incidents of domestic abuse reported to Bedfordshire Police has surged to over 200 a week in recent years. Two such incidents show the difficulties officers have investigating these cases.
7	"Lethal Weapon"	1 June 2016	2.18
The gun crime unit investigate a robbery at a hotel. A blank-firing pistol was used which had been converted to be able to fire live rounds. A man was convicted of possession of a firearm and two counts of assault, for which he was sentenced to five and a half years imprisonment.
8	"In Plain Sight"	8 June 2016	2.36
Police search thousands of hours of CCTV to find a white British man who sexually assaulted two children in their home. He was convicted and sent to prison for nine years. In a separate case, a man was convicted of trying to meet a 14 year old girl after grooming her. He was sent to prison for two years.
9	"A Complaint of Rape"	15 June 2016	1.82
Police investigate a woman's complaint of rape against a man she met in a bar. The man is not charged due to lack of evidence.

=== Series 5 ===
No.	Title	Original release date	Viewers (millions)
1	"A Moment of Madness"	5 June 2017	2.70
A Latvian man who arrived in the UK a week ago beat an Indian man in a hotel using a fire extinguisher. He was charged with attempted murder. Three months later, the victim died of his injuries and the charge was raised to murder. He pleaded guilty to manslaughter on the grounds of diminished responsibility and sent to a secure psychiatric hospital indefinitely.
2	"Their Time Will Come"	12 June 2017	2.21
A 76-year-old married grandfather is arrested for having sexually assaulted a boy for years during the 1970s, when the victim was seven. He denied the crimes whilst being interviewed by the police, but later pleaded guilty to two counts of sexual activity with a child. He was sentenced to six years imprisonment. A man is arrested for sexually assaulting a pupil of his when he was 26 and she was 15. He denied it, but another teenage female pupil came forward and showed text messages that he sent to her. He later pleaded guilty to five counts of sexual activity with a child and was sentenced to two years imprisonment.
3	"Invisible Chains"	19 June 2017	1.86
A man goes to a police station, where he says that he has escaped from an Irish Traveller halting site, where he was being kept as a slave. After police raided the site, a resident was charged with slavery offences. That case was dropped - but he was convicted of an unrelated fraud, for which he was imprisoned.
4	"Code of Silence"	26 June 2017	1.95
In a crowded pub in September 2015, a man is knocked out and his skull is fractured when he is hit by another man. The victim is on the floor for 30 minutes before someone phones the police. When they arrive, the many witnesses refuse to tell the police what happened. The attacker initially denies it, but after photographic evidence is presented to him by the police, he admits it was him. He is charged with GBH, but the charge is reduced to ABH, after it was discovered that the victim had been involved in a fight on the same night and therefore his injuries may not have been inflicted solely by the accused. He is convicted of ABH; he receives a 12 month community order and is ordered to do 120 hours community service. In a separate case, the victim is convicted of affray and possession of an offensive weapon after having attacked a man in the street. He is sentenced to five months imprisonment.
5	"The Golden Bracelet"	3 July 2017	2.23
A care worker is accused of stealing a golden bracelet from the elderly woman she is caring for. The police recovered the bracelet from Cash Converters and returned it to the victim. She was convicted of theft, fined and given 40 hours community service. A man who was on the run hands himself into the police - they charge him with GBH or having hit a man in the street, fracturing his jaw. He was convicted of GBH and sentenced to 12 months imprisonment. A man is arrested for stabbing a shopkeeper after trying to steal meatballs. He is bailed, because there is insufficient evidence against him. He is picked out at an identity parade and is charged with GBH. At his trial, he is acquitted. He was convicted in a separate case of possession with intent to supply heroin and cocaine, for which he was sentenced to four years imprisonment.

=== Series 6 ===
No.	Title	Original release date	Viewers (millions)
1	"Sex and Corruption"	19 February 2018	3.76
A man in Luton reports he is being blackmailed. Someone has discovered he has visited a prostitute and is threatening to reveal it to his wife unless paid £1,000. Detectives arrange an undercover operation in which the victim drops off the money as instructed, but the blackmailer does not come to collect it. After wondering how he could have been tipped off about the operation, they realise that the blackmailer was one of their own detectives. Detective Constable Gareth Suffling, from the Major Crime Unit is arrested, charged and dismissed from Bedfordshire Police for gross misconduct. He is convicted and sentenced to 18 months in prison, later increased on appeal to 3 years.
2	"Car Attack"	26 February 2018	3.68
Police are called to Dunstable town centre, where a man deliberately drove a car into a group of people on the pavement outside a kebab shop in the early hours of the morning before fleeing on foot. The car attack left a 50-year-old man with a shattered pelvis. After an extensive investigation into the crime, police arrested a 22-year-old man from Milton Keynes on suspicion of attempted murder. The suspect had been attacked by a group of young men in the street earlier that night and drove his car at them in revenge. The injured man, who had not been involved, was in hospital for three months before returning home. The suspect was later charged with grievous bodily harm with intent, convicted and sentenced to seven years imprisonment.
3	"Left for Dead"	5 March 2018	3.57
The body of a man was found in a park in Peterborough by a female passerby. The body was identified as a homeless man who had been addicted to heroin for years prior to his death. Cambridgeshire Constabulary believe the death to be suspicious after finding bruising around the man's neck, and launch a murder investigation. Police arrest a 34-year-old woman on suspicion of murder after CCTV evidence shows her moving the body on a mobility scooter before dumping it in the park. A post-mortem discovered that the man died naturally. The woman was charged with disposing of a corpse to obstruct the coroner and perverting the course of justice. She was sentenced to two years in prison after pleading guilty to the former charge. She was found not guilty of the latter charge.
4	"Shallow Grave"	12 March 2018	3.43
This episode focuses on the murder of a woman who had disappeared in 2003 at the age of 50. Her husband had confessed to the murder before committing suicide. The police receive information from witnesses that there were other people involved in the murder. The police start with the husband's two brothers - the first brother lives in Luton, and the second brother lives in Port Glasgow. Both had previously been arrested on suspicion of assisting the murder. After releasing them on bail, police start to dig up the back garden in the first brother's home and find a skeleton. The brothers are both re-arrested on suspicion of murder and eventually charged with perverting the course of justice, disposing of a corpse to obstruct the coroner and preventing the lawful and decent burial of a body. The first brother was found not guilty of all charges, but the second was found guilty of perverting the course of justice. He was sentenced to three months in prison, suspended for twelve months.
5	"Frequent Flyers"	19 March 2018	3.33
A man and a woman, who are drug addicts, have taken over the flat of a young woman. The man was convicted of 21 counts of fraud and 3 counts of handling stolen goods. He was sentenced to 20 months imprisonment. His girlfriend was convicted of possession of a bladed article in public. She received a 12 week suspended prison sentence.
6	"Too Close for Comfort"	26 March 2018	3.17
A woman reports to the police in Luton that she is being stalked by a former friend - a married, middle-aged Asian man. He says that he is a happily-married man, that he was just being friendly and that she stalked him. He was arrested and questioned, during which he was shown photographs of Valentine's gifts from him to her. He was later charged with stalking her. The case against him was later dismissed due to insufficient evidence.

=== Series 7 ===
No.	Title	Original release date	Viewers (millions)
1	"Body in the Grass"	21 May 2018	3.89
A 45-year-old mother is found dead in long grass in a field, on 12 September 2017. Her neck had been cut with a broken glass bottle. Police arrest her partner. They are puzzled at how calm he is and how he has made a spreadsheet about the couple's relationship. They interview him, during which he says that he had nothing to do with her death. He says that she was an alcoholic who was violent towards him. Blood is found on his front door, prompting the police to authorise their detention of him for an additional twelve hours. Police release him without charge and later determine that she committed suicide.
2	"The Kane Line"	28 May 2018	3.07
Police mount a covert surveillance operation against organised drug-dealing gangs. They carry out ten simultaneous armed dawn raids. The leader of the gang is sent to prison for 8 years, two suppliers are sentenced to 5 years and 4 months each, and a street dealer is sentenced to 3 years. An accomplice is given a 12 month community order and tagged for possessing criminal property.
3	"A Knife Through the Heart"	4 June 2018	3.21
On 30 June 2017 in a Cambridge street, 27-year-old man is stabbed through the heart and killed. Both he and the attacker were drug dealers who had known each other for years. The stabbing was a result of an argument between them. The attacker was convicted of murder and sentenced to life with a minimum of 23 years. His brother was sent to prison for 3 years for intimidating a witness.
4	"A Second Chance"	11 June 2018	3.28
Police are called to a block of flats, where a woman has been attacked and stabbed in the neck with scissors. The suspect is her partner, who has a long criminal record. There is a flashback to 2015, when he was arrested for possession of an offensive weapon - a dumbbell bar. He was further arrested for affray and attempted GBH after the police saw CCTV footage of a street altercation. He was charged with those offences and spared from jail. In the present day, he is arrested the following day for attempted murder. The injuries are not life-threatening, the victim does not want to press charges and the police cannot tell who started the fight, so he is instead charged with GBH with intent. He pleads guilty and is sentenced to 4 years imprisonment and the couple split up.
5	"Fifty Shades of Abuse"	18 June 2018	2.73
A 19-year-old woman who is in a relationship with a violent, controlling older man arrives at hospital, her skull having been fractured - but then goes missing. Six days later she goes to the police station, and tells police that he falsely imprisoned her and raped her. The police discover that he has convictions for rape and violent disorder. He arrives at the police station, where the police question him. The Crown Prosecution Service decide that there is insufficient evidence to charge the man, so he is released.
6	"What Lies Beneath"	25 June 2018	2.96
A 20-year-old gang member phones the police to report a body buried in a garden. He arrested and interviewed, but he refuses to talk to them. He is taken to court because he was due there the previous day in connection to possessing a taser and did not attend. The police search the garden that he mentioned, but do not find anything. They find that a hole has recently been dug in another garden in the same street, but that nothing is buried in it. Days earlier, his brother - who is also a gang member - had been shot. He goes home, from where his other brother phones the police to report that the first suspect has stabbed his mother. She is taken to hospital and he is arrested for attempted murder. He is severely mentally ill and the police want him taken to a psychiatric ward, but there is not a bed available. The charge is downgraded to GBH with intent. He is acquitted on grounds of insanity, having been diagnosed with paranoid schizophrenia. He is sectioned.
7	"Lost in Translation"	2 July 2018	2.77
A man is arrested at Luton Airport after arriving on a flight from Bulgaria with a 12-year-old girl. Her father, who lives in Margate, is also arrested. The police question the men individually. They are charged with child trafficking offences and remanded in custody. The victim is sent back to Bulgaria, where she lives with her siblings and mother. A third man is arrested at his flat in Margate; he paid for the plane tickets for the victim and first suspect. He is released without charge. There is insufficient evidence to prosecute any of the men. The father stays, whilst the first suspect returns to Bulgaria due to not having the correct permit to work in the UK.
8	"Living Among Us"	9 July 2018	2.72
The police receive a phone call to say that an old man has been beaten by other men. They find the victim badly beaten, and he is taken to hospital, where he is found to be suffering a bleed on the brain. He had been chatting online with someone he thought was a 13-year-old girl, but was actually a vigilante paedophile hunter. The victim had previously been convicted of sexual offences, which had been posted online. An online video is found of the victim being confronted by the man who lured him there, before several other people join. They throw eggs at the victim and hit him. He had previously been targeted by vigilantes when he lived in Yorkshire. The victim is discharged from hospital and police find him a hotel for him to stay at for the night. He is sent to prison for two-and-a-half years for facilitating a sexual offence against a child. No-one is charged in relation to him having been attacked. The police receive a call to say that a man in his thirties is viewing child pornography online. He is arrested at home and brought to the police station, where child porn images and videos are found on his mobile phone and he is questioned. He is charged with four offences: distributing child porn, and with making category A, B and C indecent images of children. He is bailed and told to appear at the Magistrates Court. He receives a two-year suspended sentence and is put on the Sex Offenders' Register for 10 years.

=== Series 8 ===
No.	Title	Original release date	Viewers (millions)
1	"Predators"	11 March 2019	3.06
A 24-year-old woman is raped at knifepoint by a youth in Peterborough. The DNA from the attacker's semen does not match anyone on the database. A 15-year-old boy is arrested, who says that she is a prostitute who made a false accusation of rape because he did not pay her after she fellated him. He is deemed mentally unfit to stand trial. A jury concludes he committed the crime as well as a sexual assault and robbery that took place a week later. He was awaiting a possible hospital order at the time the episode aired. As a result of DNA collected in the same investigation, a taxi driver in his mid-30s is arrested on suspicion of two rapes which happened in 2007. One was of a 15-year-old girl who was raped on 30 November in Totternhoe and the other was a young woman who was raped on 15 December in Stopsley. He is interviewed by the police. In regard to the December allegation, he tells them that he had consensual sex with her after she offered him fellatio and intercourse as a means of paying her fare. He initially says that he cannot remember the November incident, but later says that he had consensual sex with her and that she was in her late teens. He says that both alleged victims were sober, but police say that the 15-year-old was drunk. He is convicted of both rapes and sentenced to 22 years imprisonment - 11 years for each.
2	"Family Secrets"	18 March 2019	2.78
Bedfordshire Police's Internet Child abuse Investigation Team investigate a man who has 117 indecent images of children on his computer. He pleaded guilty and was sentenced to 12 months imprisonment, suspended. The team investigate two men for child porn offences and drug dealing. They are each sentenced to six years imprisonment for intent to supply cocaine and acquiring criminal property worth £160,000. One was found in possession of 54,000 indecent images of children and found guilty of making and distributing indecent images. He is sentenced to an additional 18 months imprisonment and will be put on the sex offenders register for 10 years after he is released.
3	"Knifed"	25 March 2019	3.37
On 21 January 2018 at The Mall in Luton, a fight occurs between three youths with weapons. During the fight, one stabs the other two. Both are hospitalised, as the attacker escapes uninjured. He is arrested and questioned, as are the two others after they are discharged from hospital. All three refuse to talk to police and are charged. The three are all convicted of crimes in relation to the fight and are imprisoned. On 22 March 2018, an 18-year-old is confronted by another youth in the street. Minutes later, he is attacked in Hartsfield Road by a group of four youths, all of whom are strangers to him. The victim is taken to hospital, where he dies of stab wounds. Three of the killers are convicted of murder and sentenced to life, with minimum sentences of 18 years, 18 years and 16 years. The other is convicted of manslaughter and sentenced to 11 years imprisonment. The youth involved in the original confrontation is questioned by police and is acquitted in court.
4	"Smuggled"	1 April 2019	3.31
Police receive intelligence of a shipment of Class A drugs that arrived at the Port of Felixstowe in June 2016 and was transported to a warehouse in Sandy. They raid the warehouse and confiscate the drugs. A blood sample on a drugs package is linked to a man from Liverpool who previously served 5 years in prison for drug dealing. Nine months later, the police are alerted that he has booked a flight from Manchester Airport to Spain. They arrest him at the airport and bring him to Bedfordshire. Two officers who know little about the case have to hurriedly become acquainted with the case before they can interview him. At Luton Crown Court in September 2017, he is convicted of drug trafficking and sentenced to 26 months imprisonment.
5	"The Detective and the Surgeon"	8 April 2019	3.06
On 15 April 2015, a surgeon Anthony McGrath phones the police, telling them that one of the windows of his house on the Luton Hoo estate, has been broken, the house burgled and £250,000 of antiques stolen. The police are suspicious because one of the items which the surgeon claims was stolen from his cellar is a rococo fireplace far too large to be put in or taken out of the cellar, as well as being far too large to be taken out of the window which would have been the only entry and exit point for the burglar(s). One of the photographs provided by the McGrath is of the fireplace. The date and place that a digital photograph is taken can be determined when GPS is enabled and that proved it was taken in July 2015 in County Meath, where the McGrath's family home is situated. That was after the burglary date, it gave sufficient evidence for the police to obtain a warrant to search both homes. On 26 November 2015, police search both homes, and arrest him at his Luton rented house. He denies the accusations by the police, and claims that he dismantled the fireplace and carried it in pieces into the cellar. He also claims that the items that the police found in his homes which match the description of those he reported stolen are similar items which he also owns. He is tried twice, and in 2019 was convicted of fraud and perverting the course of justice including mortgage fraud and McGrath was sentenced to 8 years imprisonment, with a further hearing under the Proceeds of Crime Act, to assess the compensation payable or serve further time in prison. His GP wife, Anne Louise, was acquitted of all charges.
6	"Sudden Death: Think Murder"	15 April 2019	3.10
On 5 April 2017 in Wisbech, Cambridgeshire Constabulary attend a house after a 999 phone call from there in which the caller said that a woman was dying. When they arrive, rigor mortis had set in, meaning that she had died hours before the call was made. After an initial assumption that the death of the 48-year-old Lithuanian was not suspicious, it is determined from her post mortem that she died from abdominal trauma. The young man who made the call is eliminated from the enquiry. The victim's widower is arrested and questioned by police. He says that she was a heavy drinker, that he loved her and that he did not assault her. He is convicted of murder and sentenced to life imprisonment and ordered to serve a minimum of 17 and a half years.

=== Series 9 ===
No.	Title	Original release date	Viewers (millions)
1	"Wanted"	27 September 2021	N/A
Police officers search for a man in Luton who disguises himself as a delivery driver to force his way into people's homes and commit brutal assaults. However, when the police investigation fails to make headway, the family of one of the victims launch a campaign for information on social media - which increases the likelihood of the criminal seeing he is at risk of discovery and going to ground.
2	"Chicken Shop Wars"	4 October 2021	N/A
A violent brawl fought with knives and hammers breaks out in front of a Luton takeaway. The police struggles to deal with the case due to a lack of personnel - a situation that results in the issue being raised in Parliament by the local MP. Detective Scott Hannam of the Criminal Investigation Team takes charge of the case and discovers a long-running feud between two rival families over control of the lucrative spicy chicken trade.
3	"The Horror House - Part One"	11 October 2021	N/A
Part one of a two-part report into the case of a man who sexually preyed on young people in Luton, which eventually became Bedfordshire Police's largest ever operation into historic abuse. The film begins with the work of a detective in the Child Sexual Exploitation unit, who discovers that a victim's testimony identifies a man who had been arrested eight times previously for sexual offences but had never been convicted.
4	"The Horror House - Part Two"	18 October 2021	N/A
Part two of two. Bedfordshire Police's largest ever operation into historic abuse continues, with DS Rachael Foy spending three years working to persuade victims to testify against the suspect. However, she knows that the system too often lets victims down even when they are brave enough to come forward - and in this case, many of the victims have died before they are able to do so.
5	"Murder on the Doorstep"	25 October 2021	N/A
On a quiet Sunday lunchtime in a Cambridgeshire suburb, a man lies bleeding to death. A major manhunt is triggered, where the strength of family blood ties is brutally exposed.
6	"Holding the Baby"	1 November 2021	N/A
The season concludes with the case of a baby with suspicious injuries that may have been harmed by its parents. These cases are particularly hard to investigate as there are never witnesses. If a crime has been committed, the only hope of prosecution is if the parents give themselves away - so they must be observed closely while the child is in hospital.

=== Series 10 ===
No.	Title	Original release date	Viewers (millions)
1	"Two Wrongs"	28 November 2022	3.11
Bedfordshire Police investigate a possible break-in and a devastating high-speed car chase, navigating the rights and wrongs of people taking the law into their own hands.
2	"A Wolf in Sheep's Clothing"	5 December 2022	N/A
Bedfordshire Police race to rescue a missing 15-year-old girl reportedly being held captive in what becomes a case of alleged sexual grooming and serious multiple abuse.

=== Specials (2020–26) ===
No.	Title	Original release date	Viewers (millions)
1	"Murder in the Woods (Part 1)"	6 January 2020	N/A
The first of two episodes that take viewers behind the scenes of a police investigation into the pre-mediated and brutal murder of a young man in the middle of woodland
2	"Murder in the Woods (Part 2)"	7 January 2020	N/A
The second half of the double episode. The DCI believes that he knows who was behind the murder. Cameras follow the case as detectives decide to arrest the victim's friends and father.
3	"The Home County Cartel (Part 1)"	8 November 2020	N/A
In a two part special, a covert police unit track a smuggling operation bringing huge quantities of drugs into the UK. Can they catch the ringleader?
4	"The Home County Cartel (Part 2)"	9 November 2020	N/A
The covert police operation tracking a major drug smuggling operation closes in on the ringleaders in a nerve-shredding conclusion.
5	"Black Widow (Part 1)"	4 January 2021	N/A
Cambridgeshire, police hear a recording of a woman plotting to have her ex-husband killed.
6	"Black Widow (Part 2)"	5 January 2021	N/A
Cambridgeshire, police continue their investigations only to be delayed by the suspect's medical issues.
7	"Bedfordshire's Most Wanted"	22 March 2021	N/A
In Bedfordshire, a man accused of a string of offences involving violence embarks on a frightening new crime spree. Armed officers are deployed as the suspect becomes 'Most Wanted'. He is convicted of the rape, sexual assault and false imprisonment of two teenage girls, for which he is sentenced to 18 years imprisonment.
8	"The Search for Justice"	29 March 2021	N/A
A Polish man is shot in the chest by a stranger. The attacker later threatens a woman. With the gunman on the loose, a frantic manhunt is launched to catch the shooter before he strikes again. He is convicted of attempted murder, for which he is sentenced to 22 years and six months imprisonment. The Polish man moves back to Poland.
9	"The No Body Murder"	5 April 2021	N/A
Cambridgeshire Police have started a murder hunt but have no body. A complex case and a search for clues takes them into the woods and across Europe. The case goes cold for several years until a mysterious post appears of the missing presumed dead victim on Facebook.
10	"Till Death Do Us Part"	12 April 2021	N/A
After a man is found fatally attacked, the police realise that they have met him before.
11	"Cold to the Touch (Part 1)"	3 January 2022	N/A
The first of a gripping two-part special taking viewers behind the scenes of The Cambridgeshire Police investigation into the tragic, shocking death of an 11-week-old baby
12	"Cold to the Touch (Part 2)"	4 January 2022	N/A
The investigation into the death of 11-week-old Baby Teddy concludes. With both mother and her partner under suspicion, a 999 call leads to a dramatic turn in the pursuit of justice for the infant
13	"The Murder of Rikki Neave (Part 1)"	4 July 2022	N/A
Part one of a two-part special exploring the largest ever unsolved murder case in the history of Cambridgeshire Police, the murder of a six-year-old child in 1994. Initial investigations pointed to the boy's mother, who seemed to have an interest in murder and black magic. When a new team takes over, they uncover flaws in the original police work and a compelling new lead
14	"The Murder of Rikki Neave (Part 2)"	5 July 2022	N/A
Concluding the investigation into the 1994 murder of six-year-old Rikki Neave. Fifteen years after Rikki's mother was cleared of his murder following a flawed police investigation, a team of dedicated officers from the Major Crime Unit of Cambridgeshire police were authorised to begin a fresh investigation. Analysis of the evidence put a new suspect, James Watson, who was 13 at the time of the killing, together with Rikki on the day of his disappearance. But despite a forensic breakthrough, Watson presented the officers with a conundrum that made it difficult to prove the case against him.
15	"The Honeytrap Murder (Part 1)"	20 March 2023	N/A
A man is found stabbed to death and naked in a block of flats in Luton. Did he step into a honey trap, lured by sex but set up to be violently robbed?
16	"The Honeytrap Murder (Part 2)"	21 March 2023	N/A
Two women are charged with murder after a man is found robbed, naked and stabbed to death. Can police track down the men behind this violent honey trap plot?
17	"The Siege"	3 December 2023	N/A
Feature-length special telling the gripping inside story of an armed siege in a tower block, with unprecedented access to the police command suite.
18	"The Night Prowler"	10 December 2023	N/A
A rape in a dark alleyway is reported. Is this suspected attack linked to a man who secretly filmed couples having sex?
19	"The Predator"	17 December 2023	N/A
A hook-up via a gay dating app leads to an accusation of rape. Bedfordshire Police investigate. But cases of male rape are notoriously difficult to prosecute.
20	"Murder on Camera (Part 1)"	10 January 2024	N/A
Two men are found violently murdered outside a pub. Another is fighting for his life. Police are baffled, but in such a tight-knit community they're worried no one will come forward to help them.
21	"Murder on Camera (Part 2)"	10 January 2024	N/A
Two men were brutally murdered with the lead suspect still at large. As the police manhunt intensifies, a vital letter might hold the key to the case.
22	"The Devil’s Chain"	5 June 2024	N/A
The gripping inside story of a brutal machete and gun attack on a Luton doorstep, a gold chain, and a struggle against the odds to identify the attackers.
23	"Murder on Prescription (Part 1)"	9 September 2024	N/A
A 47-year-old disabled women is found dead with her throat cut. There are suspects but no hard evidence. But then the case takes a major twist.
24	"Murder on Prescription (Part 2)"	10 September 2024	N/A
The original murder suspect is found dead and a large quantity of heroin is unearthed as detectives close in and prepare to question their final suspect.
25	"The Murder Messages"	25 November 2024	N/A
A young couple's lives are shattered by online attacks and death threats in a gripping true-crime story. Can a rookie detective solve a complex investigation where nothing is as it seems?
26	"Living the High Life"	2 December 2024	N/A
In the small towns and villages of Bedfordshire, police investigate a surge in drug use where a major fraud's linked to a local gang exploiting vulnerable youths
27	"The Murder of Jane Doe"	9 December 2024	N/A
A woman calls the police at 4am. She's in deep trouble and many miles from home. Soon she's in a coma. Can detectives solve the mystery of how she got this way?
28	"Breakout"	6 January 2025	N/A
As dozens of detainees escape from Yarl’s Wood immigration removal centre, cameras go deep inside a high-octane police manhunt. But was the breakout random or engineered by outsiders?
29	"The Norfolk Narco Cartel"	13 January 2025	N/A
The inside track on a major covert operation against a Mexican drugs cartel who the police think are importing large quantities of methyl-amphetamine into Norfolk.
30	"The Unusual Suspects"	20 January 2025	N/A
With cannabis deliveries coming through letter boxes across the country, sent to not your usual kind of suspect, Luton CID have a battle on getting a lead and bringing the chief culprit to justice.
31	"The Butcher of Suburbia (Part 1)"	29 June 2025	N/A
The gripping inside story of the investigation into the murder of a 74-year-old woman - and the killer's macabre efforts to conceal her death.
32	"The Butcher of Suburbia (Part 2)"	30 June 2025	N/A
The suspect admits to the murder of a 74-year-old woman. But a deeply disturbing tale that shocks experienced detectives has only just begun.
33	"Nightclub Predator (Part 1)"	6 July 2025	N/A
A young woman’s distressing 999 starts a rape investigation, revealing a dangerous suspect and a house filled with film records of multiple crimes.
34	"Nightclub Predator (Part 2)"	7 July 2025	N/A
The inside story of the investigation of a serial rapist continues. As evidence of more victims emerges, can police stop the suspect getting out on bail?
35	"Lost Boys"	13 July 2025	N/A
The disappearance of a 15-year-old leads the Guns & Gangs unit to a possible drug dealing line. But a raid on a suspected den gives detectives an unpleasant surprise.
36	"Murder is No Game (Part 1)"	5 October 2025	N/A
First episode of a two-part special following one of Bedfordshire Police's biggest ever murder investigations. As detectives investigate, the case grows darker and more dangerous...
37	"Murder is No Game (Part 2)"	6 October 2025	N/A
Concluding part of the special following one of Bedfordshire Police's biggest ever murder investigations. A suspect's in custody. Detectives are shocked by what their investigation reveals.
38	"A Family Vendetta (Part 1)"	8 December 2025	N/A
A 32-year-old man and his 57-year-old dad have been shot dead in their Cambridgeshire homes. What turned a family child-custody dispute into a double execution?
39	"A Family Vendetta (Part 2)"	9 December 2025	N/A
A father and son are dead after a child-custody dispute turned very nasty. The police have a prime suspect. But did the killer act alone or as part of a wider conspiracy?
40	"The Secret Network"	13 January 2026	N/A
After a Luton shotgun attack, the police track a suspected drugs and arms dealer using EncroChat - the hacked 'WhatsApp for criminals'. But has their main suspect already taken flight?
41	"Investigates: Zombie Knives"	20 January 2026	N/A
A compelling report on how weapons deliberately designed and marketed to appeal to young people are directly linked to at least 14 murders in the UK
42	"Burying Horror"	27 January 2026	N/A
An investigation into one of the country's worst serial paedophiles takes police to even darker places when several large bones are found in the offender's old garden
43	"The Cold Case Murder (Part 1)"	13 April 2026	N/A
The case of the brutal murder of 86-year-old Una Crown in 2013 is re-opened. Police think they know the killer but will the science back them up?
44	"The Cold Case Murder (Part 2)"	14 April 2026	N/A
After forensics get a partial DNA match to a previous suspect, officers bring the man in for questioning. After 13 years of denial will he finally confess?
45	"Ambush (Part 1)"	30 August 2026	TBD
A 17-year-old boy is found on a roadside with catastrophic head injuries. His twin says he was meeting a girl. But was it a trap in a violent drug war?
46	"Ambush (Part 2)"	6 September 2026	TBD
Officers believe that the brutal beating of a 17-year-old, who's now in a coma, is part of a territorial dispute between drug gangs. But can they prove it?
