= Murder of Mushin Ahmed =

2015 murder in the United Kingdom

On 10 August 2015, 81-year-old grandfather Mushin Ahmed was racially abused and attacked in Rotherham by 30-year-olds Dale Jones and Damien Hunt. He died 11 days later in hospital. In February 2016, Jones was convicted of murder and sentenced to life in prison with a minimum of 32 years, while Hunt was convicted of manslaughter and sentenced to 14 years in prison.

== Murder ==
Jones and Hunt had been abusing sambuca and cocaine the previous day. After racially abusing an Asian taxi driver, at 3:20 am, they encountered Ahmed on Doncaster Road, where he was dressed in traditional clothing to attend morning prayers. They followed him, with Jones making the false accusation that he was a "groomer." On Fitzwilliam Road, Hunt punched Ahmed, and Jones stamped on and kicked his face.

Ahmed was still conscious, but was abandoned for two hours before being found. Meanwhile, Jones and Hunt washed their clothes of blood, and the latter went fishing to provide an alibi. Ahmed died eleven days later from facial and eye socket fractures, and brain damage.

== Investigation ==
A 21-year-old man was investigated, but released without further action in October 2015.

The print of Jones' Adidas trainers matched an injury on Ahmed's face, while Hunt's DNA was found on his broken dentures. CCTV footage proved that both men were in the vicinity at the murder, and each suspect blamed the other wholly for the attack.

At Sheffield Crown Court, Jones was convicted of murder. The same charge was put against Hunt, who was cleared, but convicted of manslaughter by the jury.
