= Killing of Joanna Simpson =

2010 crime in Windsor, England

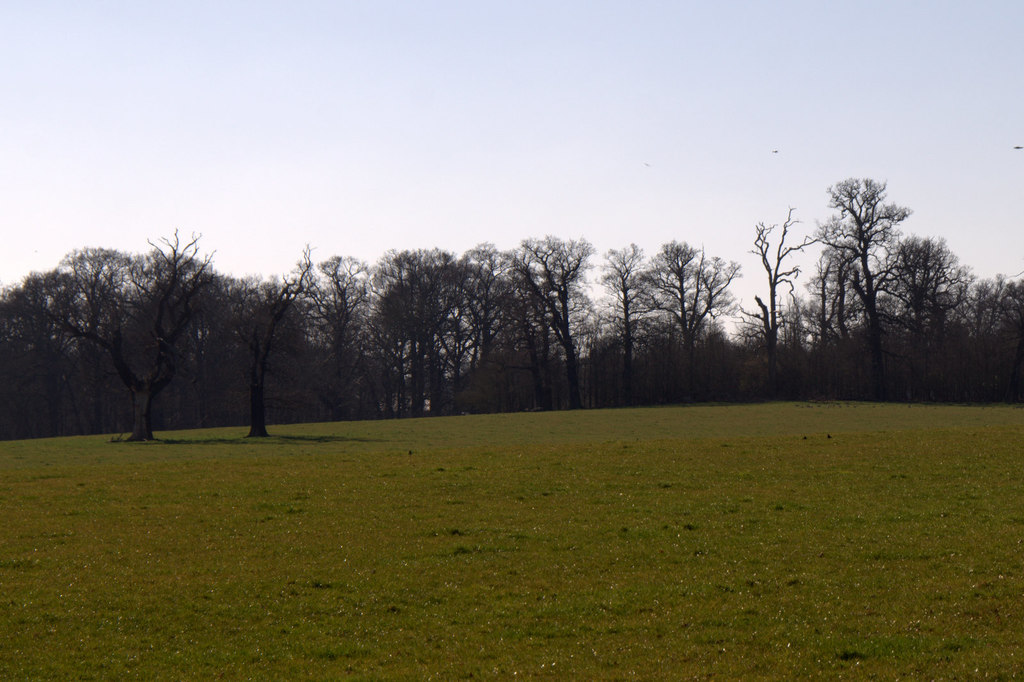
- Windsor Great Park, where Simpson's body was located
- Location: Windsor, Berkshire
- Date: 31 October 2010
- Attack type: Bludgeoning
- Weapon: Claw hammer
- Victim: Joanna Simpson
- Perpetrator: Robert Brown
- Verdict: Guilty
- Convictions: Manslaughter by diminished responsibility, obstructing a coroner
- Sentence: 26 years' imprisonment

Joanna Simpson (1964 – 31 October 2010) was a 46-year-old woman who was killed by her ex-husband, Robert Brown, on 31 October 2010. Brown argued with Simpson and bludgeoned her to death before burying her body in a pre-dug grave in Windsor Great Park.

Brown was arrested and charged with murder. In court, he pleaded not guilty to murder, but guilty to manslaughter on the grounds of diminished responsibility. The jury found him guilty of manslaughter, after hearing he had been suffering with an adjustment disorder at the time he killed Simpson. Brown was sentenced to 26 years' imprisonment for both manslaughter and for preventing the lawful burial of a body.

In November 2023, Brown was scheduled for release, having served half of his sentence. Simpson's family and friends successfully campaigned for the Secretary of State for Justice to utilise new powers afforded to him under the Police, Crime, Sentencing and Courts Act 2022 to block Brown's automatic release. If Brown serves his full sentence, he will be released in 2036.

== Background ==
=== Joanna Simpson ===
Joanna Simpson
- Born: 1964
- Died: 31 October 2010 (aged 46); Windsor, Berkshire
- Cause of death: Blunt force trauma to the head
- Spouse: Robert Brown (1999–2007)
- Children: 2

Simpson was born to Dianna Parkes and Chris Simpson in York, Yorkshire. She attended York College for Girls before her family moved to Laxey on the Isle of Man upon the sale of her father's building firm. There, Simpson attended the Buchan School. Following time at a grammar school in Oxford, Simpson studied business at the University of Bath. After leaving university, she set up a bed and breakfast on the outskirts of Windsor Great Park.

=== Robert Brown ===
Robert Brown
- Born: 1964/1965 (age 59)
- Occupation: Former airline pilot for British Airways
- Criminal charges: Manslaughter, preventing the lawful burial of a body
- Criminal penalty: 26 years' imprisonment
- Criminal status: Imprisoned
- Spouse: Joanna Simpson (1999–2007)
- Children: 2

Brown was from Edinburgh, with his father originally working in shipyards and his mother working for the Bank of Scotland. Brown stated that as a child he wanted to be a pilot. He was passionate about running, and had been the UK trail-running champion three times.

Brown was a pilot and flew long-haul flights, usually to San Francisco, Los Angeles and Hong Kong. At the time of Simpson's murder, Brown captained Boeing 747s for British Airways. On returning from long haul flights, he would rarely spend much time with Simpson. He was described as "quite reserved", as well as being rude to Simpson's friends, who described how Simpson was more relaxed when Brown was not present.

=== Relationship ===
Simpson had previously been married to another man, before they divorced amicably. When she met Brown, Simpson introduced him to her parents on the Isle of Man. Her parents disliked Brown, describing him as "rude" and "arrogant".

Brown and Simpson's romance was described as a 'whirlwind', with Brown moving in with Simpson in September 1998, into the house that Simpson had purchased with her first husband. Brown proposed to Simpson in Hong Kong on Christmas Day 1998, after he had piloted a plane there as part of a Christmas trip he was working. He suggested that the couple get married in February, and they did so on 13 February 1999, at a small ceremony in Ascot. Simpson's parents did not convey their opinions on Brown to Simpson, although her father made the couple sign a prenup. From their honeymoon in Cape Town, Simpson contacted her mother and stated that marrying Brown was "a terrible mistake", although she worked to make the marriage successful. In April 1999 she found out that she was pregnant, which left her feeling "trapped". The couple's first child was born in December 1999, and their second in May 2001.

The family lived in Ascot at an address in a "Millionaires' Row" area, surrounded by Windsor Great Park. This allowed Brown to be near to Heathrow for his work.

==== Breakdown ====
In January 2007, Simpson went to see a solicitor about the marriage after Brown had accused her of having an affair. The following month, while in Hong Kong, Brown telephoned Simpson and told her that he was having "really dark thoughts", such as thinking about killing her and their children with an axe and about committing suicide by crashing a plane.

On one occasion, Simpson arrived home late at approximately 22:00 with the couple's children. As Brown put them to bed, his daughter explained that they had spent time that day with the man that he thought Simpson was having an affair with. Brown confronted Simpson about this in the kitchen of the house, before placing an arm around her neck and holding a knife against her chest. Managing to talk him out of attacking her, Simpson told Brown that she could no longer be with him. Brown said that she could leave, but that she could not take the children.

The next day, Simpson travelled to the Isle of Man on her mother's request. In a phone call with Brown, Simpson reiterated her desire to leave him, to which he said that if she told anyone what had happened, it would be "the worst" for her.

Following the marriage break-up, Brown began a relationship with a British Airways cabin crew member.

=== Influence of Radmacher v Granatino ===
Eleven days before Simpson disappeared, on 20 October 2010, German heiress Katrin Radmacher, at that time thought to be worth approximately £100m, won a "landmark legal battle" in a UK court regarding the terms of her divorce. The ruling held that the prenup drawn up to protect Radmacher's £100 million fortune from her French-born husband Nicolas Granatino was legally binding. Granatino had sought to invalidate the agreement on the grounds that he claimed Radmacher had not revealed her vast wealth before he signed it. While the case established for the first time that prenups are enforceable in the UK, courts still retained the discretionary right to veto them if they were found to be unfair.

Simpson contacted her step-brother and a friend, excited that a precedent had been set by the case that might apply to her divorce proceedings. The friend knew that it would anger Brown if he found out that he was not entitled to any money.

== Incident ==
On the afternoon of 31 October, Brown returned the children to Simpson's house at the end of a week-long stay with him.

As she was frightened of Brown, Simpson normally had another person with her when he returned the children. However, none of her friends were present on this occasion. After the children ran into the house, Brown and Simpson began arguing at the front door. He then struck her 14 times with a hammer.

Witnessed by their younger child, Brown then carried Simpson to the boot of his vehicle. He went into the master bedroom of the house and removed the CCTV unit for the house out of the cupboard, then told the children to get into the car and drove them to his pregnant girlfriend's house. He then turned off his mobile phone took Simpson's body to a remote area of woodland in Windsor Great Park where he had previously dug a shallow grave, and buried her inside a plastic garden box.

== Investigation ==
The investigation was led by Senior Investigating Officer Detective Chief Inspector Steve Tolmie, with a team of 100 people.

On the morning of 1 November 2010, Brown made a phone call to police, requesting an appointment to discuss a "serious domestic incident" that he had been involved in. The phone call raised concerns about Simpson's welfare, and the police dispatched officers to her address. Forcing entry, they found blood in and around the property, but Simpson was not there.

When Brown attended Maidenhead Police Station, he was arrested on suspicion of murdering Simpson. Police assumed that as Brown had handed himself in, he would disclose what had happened and where Simpson was. He was interviewed approximately nine times, but repeatedly said "no comment" before portraying himself as a victim in the acrimonious divorce. He cited the prenup as the reason, which interviewers saw as a possible motive for her killing. During an interview on 3 November, police showed Brown photographs of blood within Simpson's address, and following a discussion with his solicitor, he stated to the police that he "lost control and pushed her" before "[trying] to hide her in a box from the garden centre and [burying] her in Windsor Great Park".

On 4 November, Brown accompanied police to a secluded area of woodland near Legoland Windsor, where they found Simpson's body in a black bag within the buried plastic box.

=== Post-mortem and burial ===
Simpson's post-mortem was conducted at Wexham Park Hospital, and revealed that she had been attacked with a claw hammer and had been beaten with "heavy force" to the head at least 14 times. Simpson's body showed signs of self-defence injuries, where she had raised her hands in an attempt to protect herself. Any one of the impacts from the hammer could have been fatal.

Simpson was buried on the Isle of Man on land belonging to her family.

== Legal proceedings ==
Brown appeared at Slough Magistrates' Court, where the court heard that Simpson had suffered "a violent, unnatural or sudden death." Brown was remanded in custody.

On 11 May 2011, Brown first appeared at Reading Crown Court in a trial which lasted ten days. He denied murdering Simpson, but admitted manslaughter on grounds of diminished responsibility. The defence provided a psychiatric report that stated Brown was suffering from a mental disorder at the time he killed her. The first psychiatric diagnosis was made when Brown was assessed by M. E. C. Alcock, a consultant forensic psychiatrist engaged by the defence team, who diagnosed him with a stress-related adjustment disorder. Alcock told the jury that particularly stressful events in Brown's life, such as the acrimonious divorce, had contributed to the disorder. He explained that this could cause a person to become mentally and emotionally unstable, impairing Brown's ability to control himself.

In contrast, Philip Joseph, a consultant forensic psychiatrist engaged by the prosecution, disagreed with this assessment. Having visited Brown in prison, Joseph described him as "an intelligent man, a resilient person," and someone "in control," suggesting Brown would have been unlikely to continue as an airline pilot if he could not manage stress.

On the first day of the trial, one of Simpson's friends gave evidence relating to the knife incident that had occurred previously, where Brown had held a knife to Simpson's chest. In court, Brown denied this event had happened.

The prosecution argued that the killing had been murder and not manslaughter, attempting to show premeditation by citing Brown's having previously dug the grave and having taken a hammer to Simpson's address, hidden in one of the children's bags. The defence argued that Brown was in fact a victim, picking on Simpson's character and personality, seeking to show she was "rich" and "controlling" regarding the prenuptial agreement, which made Brown's life "very difficult".

Brown gave evidence at the trial, which is uncommon in cases where the defendant has provided a defence of diminished responsibility. He described Simpson as a "scheming, rich brat", and stated that he had been driven to kill her by years of recriminations and bitter divorce proceedings, particularly regarding the prenup that he alleged he had been forced to sign. He stated that the agreement was an attempt to deprive him of money which he felt he was owed.

Describing his actions of 31 October, Brown said that he had picked up a hammer from his bike shed and concealed it in his daughter's homework bag, but he provided no explanation why. He stated that their argument was over medication, and alleged that during it he went to his daughter's bag to get the medication and could not remember what happened next. He said that his next recollection was after Simpson's body had been buried, when he realised that he had the CCTV unit and the hammer with him and also buried those items in Windsor Great Park. His justification for burying the plastic box in advance of Simpson's killing was to collate court papers and documents about the divorce and "bury the sham of his marriage" as a time capsule.

The trial concluded on 24 May. On the charge of murder, the jury returned a verdict of not guilty; Brown was found guilty of manslaughter.

Brown was sentenced to 26 years' imprisonment, of which two years was for obstructing a coroner. Simpson's family and friends described the lack of a murder conviction as a "miscarriage of justice".

=== Brown's parole ===
Brown was eligible for release half-way through his sentence, with the remainder to be served on licence and monitored by the National Probation Service.

In March 2023, with Brown's possible release due in early November, Simpson's family and friends campaigned against it, citing the Police, Crime, Sentencing and Courts Act 2022, which allows the Secretary of State for Justice to stop the release of any prisoner they believe poses a serious risk to the public. The campaign was supported by former Lord Chancellor and Justice Secretary Sir Robert Buckland MP, former Home Secretary Priti Patel MP, Jess Phillips MP, who was then Shadow Minister for Domestic Violence and Safeguarding, and Carrie Johnson, a domestic abuse campaigner and the wife of former Prime Minister Boris Johnson.

On 10 October, Secretary of State for Justice Alex Chalk KC MP stated that Brown would not be automatically released from prison and would instead be referred to the Parole Board. Brown unsuccessfully challenged the decision at the High Court, with the rationale that Chalk was overturning something that was previously decided by the judge at the original trial.

In May 2026, the Parole Board deemed Brown unfit for release.

=== Honours ===
Simpson's mother and Simpson's friend Hetti Barkworth-Nanton were awarded CBEs in the 2024 New Year Honours for services to people affected by domestic abuse and homicide.

== See also ==
- Domestic violence in the United Kingdom
- Refuge (United Kingdom charity)
