= Legacy Independent Funeral Directors scandal =

English funeral directors scandal

- Date: 2012–2024
- Location: Kingston upon Hull, England
- Convicted: Robert Bush
- Charges: 67; Preventing the lawful and decent burial of a body; Fraud by false representation; Fraudulent trading; Theft
- Verdict: Guilty on all counts
- Sentence: 20 years imprisonment

The Legacy Independent Funeral Directors Scandal was a major criminal scandal in Kingston upon Hull, England uncovered by Humberside Police in 2024, involving multiple counts of a funeral director preventing the lawful burial of a body as well as selling fraudulent funeral plans and committing theft from charities. Legacy Funeral director Robert Bush was sentenced to 20 years imprisonment on 67 counts on 31 July 2026.

== Overview ==
The Hessle Road site of Legacy Independent Funeral Directors (then trading as Heavenly Services) during the funeral of Joe Longthorne in August 2019

On 6 March 2024, Humberside Police officers were called to three branches of Legacy Independent Funeral Directors in Hull and Beverley on a report for 'concern for care of the deceased'. The largest investigation ever held by Humberside Police saw forensic officers find 35 bodies as well as 167 sets of human ashes at Legacy's site on Hessle Road, resulting in two arrests for preventing the lawful burial of a body and for fraud.

Bodies were found in various states of decomposition in various locations on the premises, including on the floor, and under tarpaulin. One of those remains was a stillborn baby whose remains were found on the floor in a paper bag, of which officers initially thought were that of a baby bird. Other unidentified ashes were found in mouldy boxes, as well as family photographs and other such sentimental items on the "extremely dirty" floor. Officers noted the bodies were "not washed and many were left in a soiled state [...] Bodies were simply abandoned for nature to take its course. None were kept in a dignified manner."

The force set up an inquiry into the funeral directors and established a helpline for affected families, later presenting the Crown Prosecution Service with a file of 13,000 exhibits from the inquiry to consider using as evidence, and on 2 April 2025, the CPS charged Robert Bush with 30 counts of preventing the lawful burial of a body, 36 counts of fraud by false representation and one count of theft from twelve charities. Families were given sets of ashes by Bush, who told them that they were the remains of their loved one, whilst in reality their body was still in the funeral parlour left to decompose. It was revealed that the ashes given to families were that of animal remains or other material.

On 15 October 2025, Bush pled guilty to the charges of fraud by false representation, and on 2 April 2026, Bush changed his pleas for preventing the lawful burial of a body and for theft to guilty. The offences covered a period of approximately 12 years, and had over 300 victims. Bush was sentenced to 20 years in prison on a total of 67 individual counts on 31 July 2026 by Mr Justice Hilliard.

The events of the scandal highlighted that the English, Welsh and Northern Irish funeral industry is unregulated, and the victims called for change; Prime Minister Andy Burnham backed this change for the industry to be regulated.
