= Disposal of a corpse with intent to obstruct or prevent a coroner's inquest =

Common law offence in England and Wales

Disposal of a corpse with intent to obstruct or prevent a coroner's inquest is an offence under the common law of England and Wales. The offence is currently very rarely charged. As a common law offence, it is tried on indictment and can be punished by an unlimited fine and/or period of imprisonment.

Conduct amounting to the offence includes: burying the body of anyone who has died a violent death before the coroner has had the opportunity of holding an inquest on it, and preventing the burial of a dead body or disposing of a dead body in order to prevent the holding of an inquest over it in a case where the coroner has reasonable ground for holding an inquest.

It is a separate common law offence to Prevent the lawful (and decent) burial of a body.
