= Murder of Libby Squire =

Killing of student in Hull, England

Libby Squire
- Born: Liberty Anna Squire; 1 January 1998; England
- Died: 1 February 2019 (aged 21); Kingston upon Hull, England
- Cause of death: Murder
- Body discovered: 20 March 2019
- Education: University of Hull
- Occupation: University student
- Parent(s): Lisa Squire, Russell Squire

Murder of Libby Squire
- Date: 1 February 2019
- Location: Kingston upon Hull, England
- Convicted: Pawel Relowicz
- Charges: Murder; Rape
- Verdict: Guilty on all counts
- Sentence: Life imprisonment (27 years before eligible for parole)

On 31 January 2019, Liberty Anna "Libby" Squire, a 21‑year‑old English university student, disappeared after a night out with friends in Kingston upon Hull in the East Riding of Yorkshire. In the days after her disappearance, Humberside Police and Squire's parents made a public appeal for information, and police carried out door-to-door enquiries near to where she lived and had last been seen. Officers searched bins, drains, and the partially frozen Beverley and Barmston Drain for evidence.

On 6 February, just under a week after Squire disappeared, 24-year-old Pawel Relowicz was arrested on suspicion of her abduction, after CCTV showed his silver Vauxhall Astra in the area when she went missing. On 10 February, he was charged with five unrelated sexual and burglary offences, committed between December 2017 and January 2019, but was not at that time charged with any offences relating to Squire's disappearance.

On 20 March, approximately seven weeks after Squire disappeared, a woman's body was discovered by fishermen in the Humber Estuary, close to Grimsby docks. The following day, it was identified as Squire. It was not possible for police to determine the cause of death, because of how long the body had been in the water. On 24 October, Relowicz was charged with the rape and murder of Squire. On 11 February 2021, he was convicted of both offences and sentenced to life imprisonment, with a minimum of 27 years before he will be eligible for parole.

== Background and disappearance ==
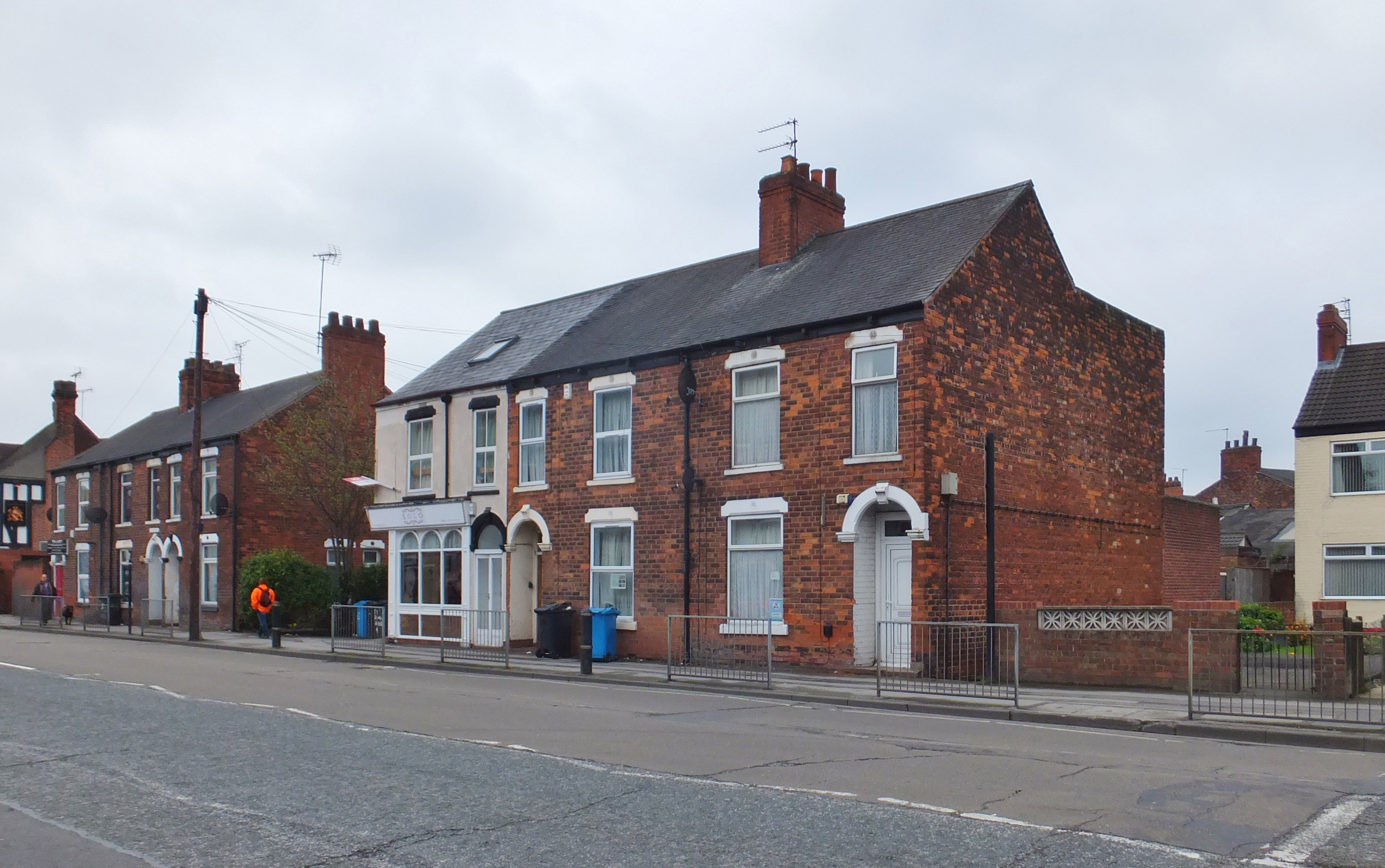
Squire was last seen along Beverley Road in Kingston upon Hull.

Liberty Anna Squire was born on 1 January 1998 and grew up in West Wycombe, Buckinghamshire. At the time of her death, she was studying philosophy at the University of Hull.

On the evening of 31 January 2019, Squire, aged 21, was on a night out with friends. At around 11:20 pm she was refused entry to The Welly, a music venue and nightclub in central Hull, because door staff thought she was too intoxicated. Her friends called a taxi to take her to her home in Wellesley Avenue, and it dropped her off at around 11:30 pm. She did not enter her house. Ten minutes later she was seen about half a mile away on Beverley Road. Witnesses saw her "crying and sobbing" in the street. Some attempted to assist her but found she was incoherent and aggressive, and they eventually gave up.

== Investigation ==
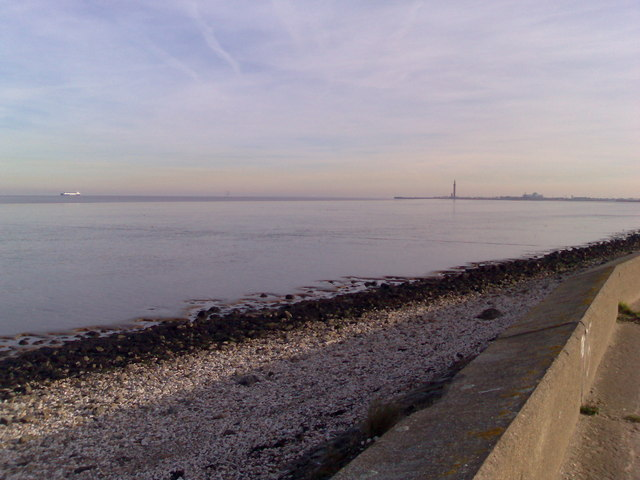
Squire's body was found in the Humber Estuary by a fisherman.

The search for Squire was the largest missing person search in the history of Humberside Police. In the days after her disappearance, her parents, Russell and Lisa Squire, made a public appeal for information and for her return. More than 100 police officers and staff searched for evidence, while specialist teams searched nearby bodies of water, including the River Hull and the Beverley and Barmston Drain.

Pawel Relowicz, aged 24, was arrested on 6 February on suspicion of abducting Squire. As part of the investigation, he was charged with voyeurism, outraging public decency, and burglary offences. These charges related to a series of sexually motivated offences committed between June 2017 and December 2018 and were unrelated to Squire. They included Relowicz masturbating in public, spying on women in their homes, and stealing sex toys, underwear, and cash during burglaries. On 13 August, he pleaded guilty to nine offences at Sheffield Crown Court, and on 16 August was sentenced to eight and a half years' imprisonment.

Squire's body was found by a fisherman in the Humber Estuary on 20 March, almost two months after she went missing. The body was so severely decomposed that the cause of death could not be determined. On 24 October, while still imprisoned for the earlier sexual and burglary offences, Relowicz was charged with the rape and murder of Squire.

== Trial ==
On 31 October, Relowicz appeared before Kingston upon Hull Crown Court charged with rape and murder. He was remanded in custody, and a provisional trial date was set for June 2020 at Sheffield Crown Court.

The trial commenced on 12 January 2021 and lasted four and a half weeks. The Crown, prosecuting, contended that Relowicz had been in the centre of Hull "looking for an opportunity" on the night of 31 January 2019. When he came across Squire, drunk and possibly suffering from hypothermia, he invited or forced her into his car with the intention of committing a sexual offence. The prosecution alleged he then took Squire to Oak Road playing fields, a nearby open space, where he raped and murdered her. He then disposed of her body in the River Hull. Scratches to Relowicz's face were evidence she had tried to defend herself. The prosecution also highlighted Relowicz's history of sexual and sexually motivated offending in the 18 months before the murder, alleging he was a man with "uncontrollable sexual urges".

In his defence, Relowicz alleged he was a "good Samaritan" and said he stopped only to offer help to the visibly intoxicated Squire. He said he drove her to Oak Road playing fields, where they hugged, kissed, and had consensual sex. When she tried to kiss him again, he turned away, and she scratched his face. He alleged he then left her at the playing fields and drove off in search of "attractive women". He admitted committing one further public sex act that night, but denied he was sexually excited as a result of Squire's murder. During the trial, extracts from Squire's medical records were read to the jury, showing she had previously experienced suicidal thoughts, including thoughts of drowning herself in a river.

On 11 February, after six days of deliberation, the jury found Relowicz guilty of both the rape and murder of Squire, unanimously on the charge of rape and by a majority of 11 to one on the charge of murder. On 12 February, Relowicz was sentenced at the same court to life imprisonment with the possibility of parole after 27 years, for Squire's murder. He was sentenced to a concurrent term of 18 years' imprisonment for her rape. In her sentencing remarks, the judge, Mrs Justice Lambert, agreed with the description of Relowicz's crimes as a "perverted campaign of sexually deviant behaviour", and of him as a "very dangerous individual".

== Aftermath ==
Following the trial, the Attorney General's Office was asked to examine Relowicz's sentence under the unduly lenient sentence scheme, which allows members of the public to request that a Crown Court sentence is reconsidered. In March 2021, it concluded Relowicz's sentence was not unduly lenient, and it would not ask the Court of Appeal to reconsider it.

After her daughter's murder, Squire's mother began publicly advocating for men convicted of non-contact sexual offences, such as voyeurism, to be given tougher sentences, as well as therapy. Her campaign alleges this will prevent sex offenders escalating to more serious offences of rape and murder, as happened with Relowicz and other contemporaneous high-profile offenders, such as Wayne Couzens. In March 2022, she met Prime Minister Boris Johnson, who was reportedly sympathetic to her cause. In October 2022, it was reported that she was to meet her daughter's murderer in prison; Relowicz later withdrew his consent for the meeting.

== Pawel Relowicz ==
Custody photograph of Relowicz, released by Humberside Police following his conviction in February 2021.

Relowicz was born on 25 June 1994 in Warszewice in northern Poland. He came to the United Kingdom in 2015. At the time of the murder, he was employed as a butcher, working for Karro Food Group at a meat processing plant in Malton, North Yorkshire.

Relowicz was married, having met his wife, Jagoda, on a dating website in 2016. They met in person on only a few occasions before she moved from Poland to live with him in Hull. The couple had two children. They separated following his conviction, and she returned to Poland. At the time of Squire's murder, Relowicz had no criminal record. However, since 2017 he had been committing an escalating series of sexual offences and sexually motivated burglaries in Hull. In July 2017, a woman sharing an "intimate moment" with her boyfriend spotted him spying on them through her ground-floor bedroom window. In December of that year, he broke into a house and stole three vibrators. He also stole cash, sex toys, condoms, clothing, and electronics in separate burglaries.

In January 2019, less than three weeks before Squire's murder, Relowicz publicly masturbated in front of groups of women on two separate occasions. In one incident, he followed the women home and ejaculated onto the front door of their house. Although he left substantial evidence at the scene of many of these offences, Relowicz was not identified because he had no criminal record, and his DNA and fingerprints were not available to police. He was linked to these earlier crimes only after his arrest in February 2019.

At the time of his arrest, Relowicz was found to be in possession of a pink holdall containing sex toys, female underwear, and photographs of women, all of which he had stolen in burglaries. His semen and saliva were found on some of the items. During his trial for the rape and murder of Squire, Relowicz accepted he had a "problem" controlling his sexual urges.

== See also ==
- List of solved missing person cases (post-2000)
