= Justine Curran =

British police officer

Justine Curran, QPM is a retired British police officer who served as Chief Constable of Humberside Police until February 2017.

Curran was born in Sheffield and raised in Parbold, Lancashire. After graduating from Hull University with a degree in classics, she joined Greater Manchester Police in 1989, initially working as a constable in Wigan. She was subsequently promoted to the rank of sergeant in 1991, inspector in 1995 and chief inspector in 1998.

In 2003, she was promoted to chief superintendent, rising to the rank of assistant chief constable in 2007. In this role, she was in charge of the counter terrorism unit in the north-west. In 2010, she became chief constable of Tayside Police. While she was in charge at Tayside, officers from the specialist crime division of Police Scotland were brought in to investigate the theft of a top-secret dossier, reportedly containing a number of allegations of improper behaviour made against Curran, from the executive offices at the former force's headquarters.

She was appointed Chief Constable of Humberside Police in 2013. She was awarded the Queen's Police Medal in June 2013.

On 20 February 2017, Curran left her position as chief constable of Humberside Police, 18 months ahead of her retirement and without any financial settlement.

== Honours ==

Ribbon	Description	Notes
	Queen's Police Medal (QPM)	June 2013.
	Queen Elizabeth II Golden Jubilee Medal	2002; UK Version of this Medal
	Queen Elizabeth II Diamond Jubilee Medal	2012; UK Version of this Medal
	Police Long Service and Good Conduct Medal	

Police appointments
Preceded by Tim Hollis	Chief Constable of Humberside Police; 2013–2017	Succeeded by Lee Freeman
