= Matthew Grove =

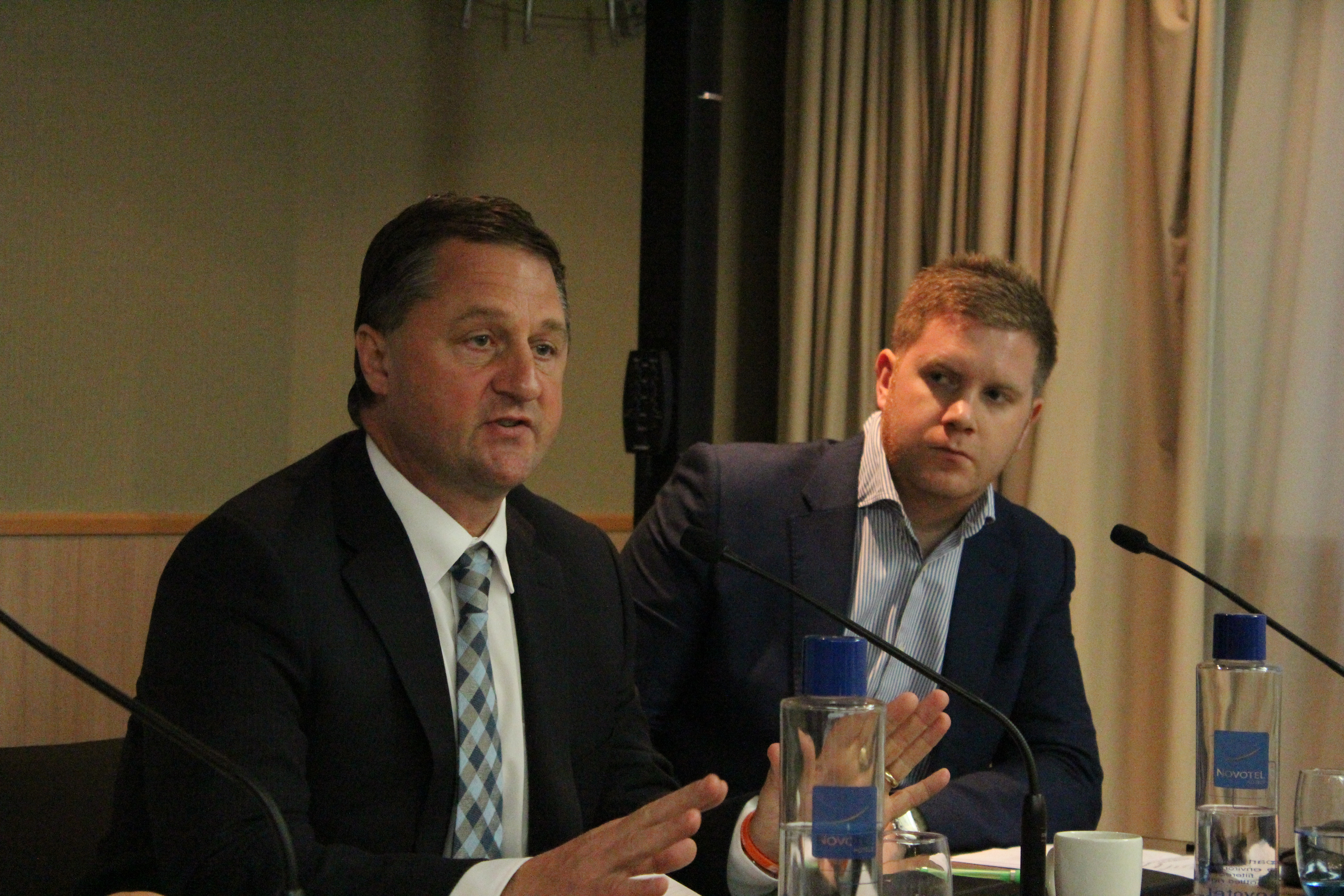
- Grove (left) in 2013

Humberside Police and Crime Commissioner
- In office 22 November 2012 – 11 May 2016
- Preceded by: Office created
- Succeeded by: Keith Hunter

East Riding Councillor for Mid Holderness
- In office 3 May 2007 – 1 March 2012
- Preceded by: Brian Willie
- Succeeded by: John Holtby

Personal details
- Born: Matthew Paul Grove; May 1963
- Party: Liberal Democrats; Conservative (formerly)

Matthew Paul Grove (born May 1963) is a former Conservative Humberside Police and Crime Commissioner.

== Career ==
Grove was the first person to hold the post of Humberside Police and Crime Commissioner, serving between November 2012 and May 2016. He was elected following a closely fought race with Labour's John Prescott. Grove was previously a local councillor in the East Riding of Yorkshire for Mid Holderness.

He lost his seat to the Labour party candidate Keith Hunter in the 5 May 2016 election.

Grove later defected to the Liberal Democrats.
