= Keith Hunter (politician) =

British politician and officer

Humberside Police and Crime Commissioner
- In office 12 May 2016 – 12 May 2021
- Preceded by: Matthew Grove
- Succeeded by: Jonathan Evison

Personal details
- Party: Labour

Keith Hunter is a British politician and former police officer, who is a former Police and Crime Commissioner for Humberside, representing the Labour Party. He was elected to the post on 5 May 2016, succeeding the previous incumbent, Matthew Grove. Hunter spent thirty years with Humberside Police, rising to the rank of Chief Superintendent, where he was divisional commander at Kingston upon Hull. He retired in 2011, but caused controversy prior to his departure after a series of interviews he gave to the Hull Daily Mail in which he was critical of government budget cuts to the police, describing them as the "perfect storm" for rising crime. He sought the Labour candidacy at the 2012 police and crime commissioner elections, but was defeated by former Deputy Prime Minister John Prescott.
