= Tayside Police =

- Motto: Semper Vigilo

Agency overview
- Formed: 1975 (merger)
- Dissolved: 2013
- Superseding agency: Police Scotland

Jurisdictional structure
- Operations jurisdiction: Angus, Dundee, Perth & Kinross, Scotland
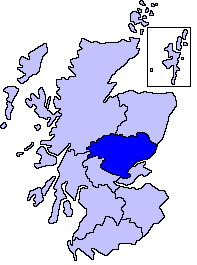
- Map of Tayside Police's jurisdiction
- Area: 7,497 square km
- Population: 388,000

Operational structure
- Headquarters: Dundee
- Sworn members: As of 31 March 2011; Officers: 1,255; Special Constables: 172; Police Staff: 615
- Agency executive: Justine Curran, Chief Constable
- Divisions: 3

Facilities
- Stations: 27

Website
- www.facebook.com/TaysidePoliceMuseum

Tayside Police was a territorial police force covering the Scottish council areas of Angus, Dundee City and Perth and Kinross (the former Tayside region) until 1 April 2013, at which point it was subsumed into Police Scotland. The total area covered by the force was 2,896 square miles (7,500 km^{2}) with a population of 388,000. In February 2008, the force operated from 27 police stations and had an establishment of 1078 police officers, 151 special constables and 594 support staff. Tayside Police was Scotland's fourth-largest police force.

== History ==
It was formed on 16 May 1975, with the region of Tayside, as an amalgamation of the Perth and Kinross Constabulary, Angus Constabulary and City of Dundee Police. The force was operationally subdivided into three Divisions, equating to the respective council areas - Western Division serving Perth and Kinross, Eastern Division serving Angus and Central Division serving the Dundee City council area.

The work of the force was overseen by the Tayside Police Joint Board, whose 18 members were nominated by the respective councils (7 by Dundee, 6 by Perth & Kinross, 5 by Angus).

Tayside Police were the first in Scotland and the UK to pilot new social media software, MyPolice, launched on 17 January 2011. In a three-month pilot, ten local community officers from the Southern Perthshire area tested the software by replying to community concerns, and using Twitter to engage with communities.

An Act of the Scottish Parliament, the Police and Fire Reform (Scotland) Act 2012, created a single Police Service of Scotland - known as Police Scotland - with effect from 1 April 2013. This merged the eight regional police forces in Scotland (including Tayside Police), together with the Scottish Crime and Drug Enforcement Agency, into a single service covering the whole of Scotland. Police Scotland has its headquarters at the Scottish Police College at Tulliallan in Fife.

== Executive ==
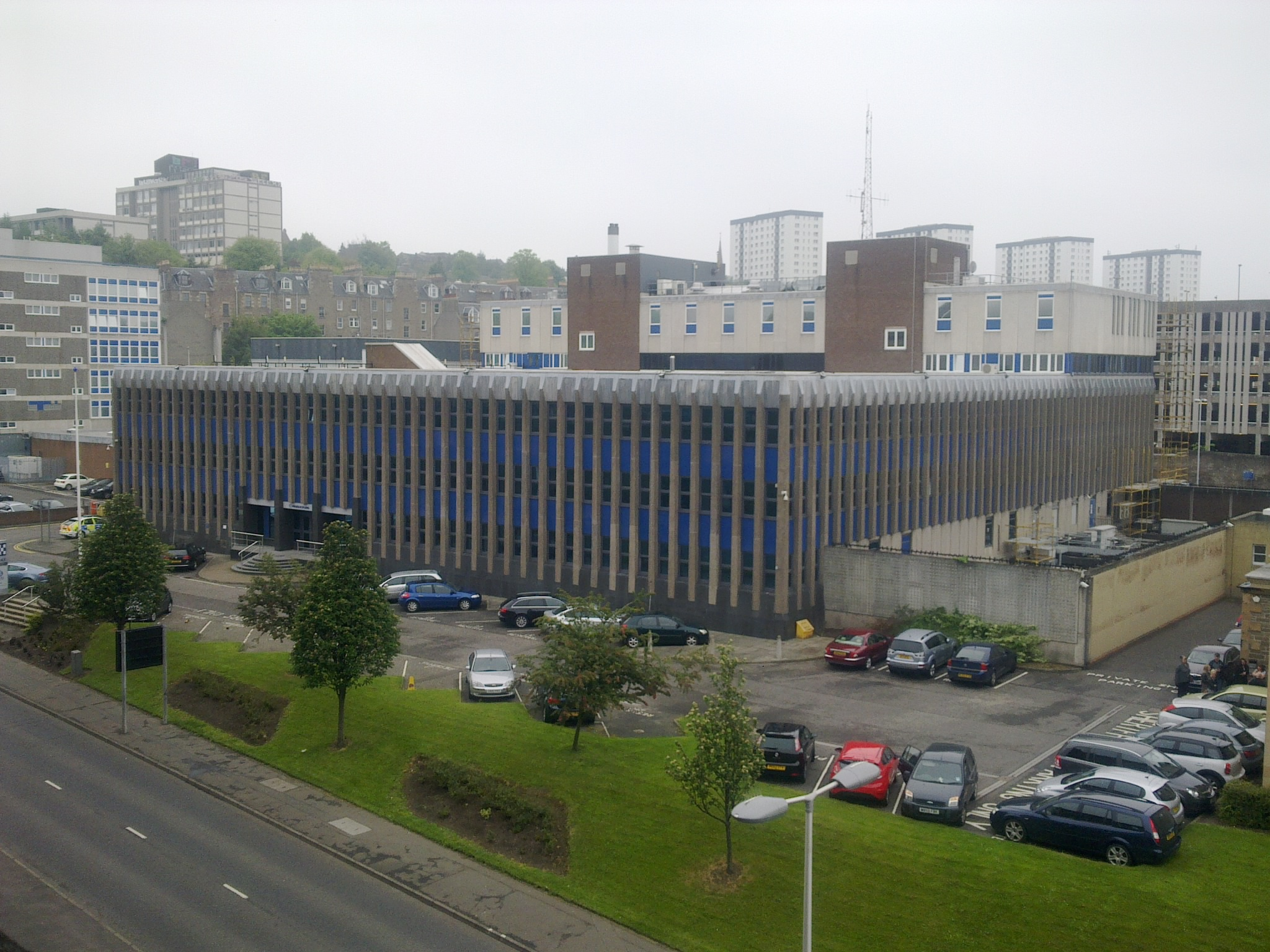
Former headquarters of Tayside Police in 2014

Legacy Tayside command structure:

- Chief constable - Justine Curran
- Deputy chief constable - Gordon Scobbie
- Assistant chief constable (Temp) - A Wilson
- Director of corporate services - Douglas Cross

Positions subsumed into the unified Police Service of Scotland “Police Scotland” from 1 April 2013. The last chief constable was Iain Livingstone, who was first appointed on 15 August 2018.
