= Jonathan Evison (politician) =

English politician

Humberside Police and Crime Commissioner
- Incumbent
- Assumed office 13 May 2021
- Preceded by: Keith Hunter
- Majority: 2,919

Personal details
- Party: Conservative
- Website: www.jonathanevison.org.uk

Jonathan Evison is a British Conservative politician who has been Humberside Police and Crime Commissioner since 2021, having retained the position in the May 2024 election.

Evison is a councillor for the Barton ward on North Lincolnshire Council and was elected Lord Mayor of the council on 20 May 2019. He served for two years due to the COVID-19 pandemic.
