= Sheffield Law Courts =

Judicial building in Sheffield, England

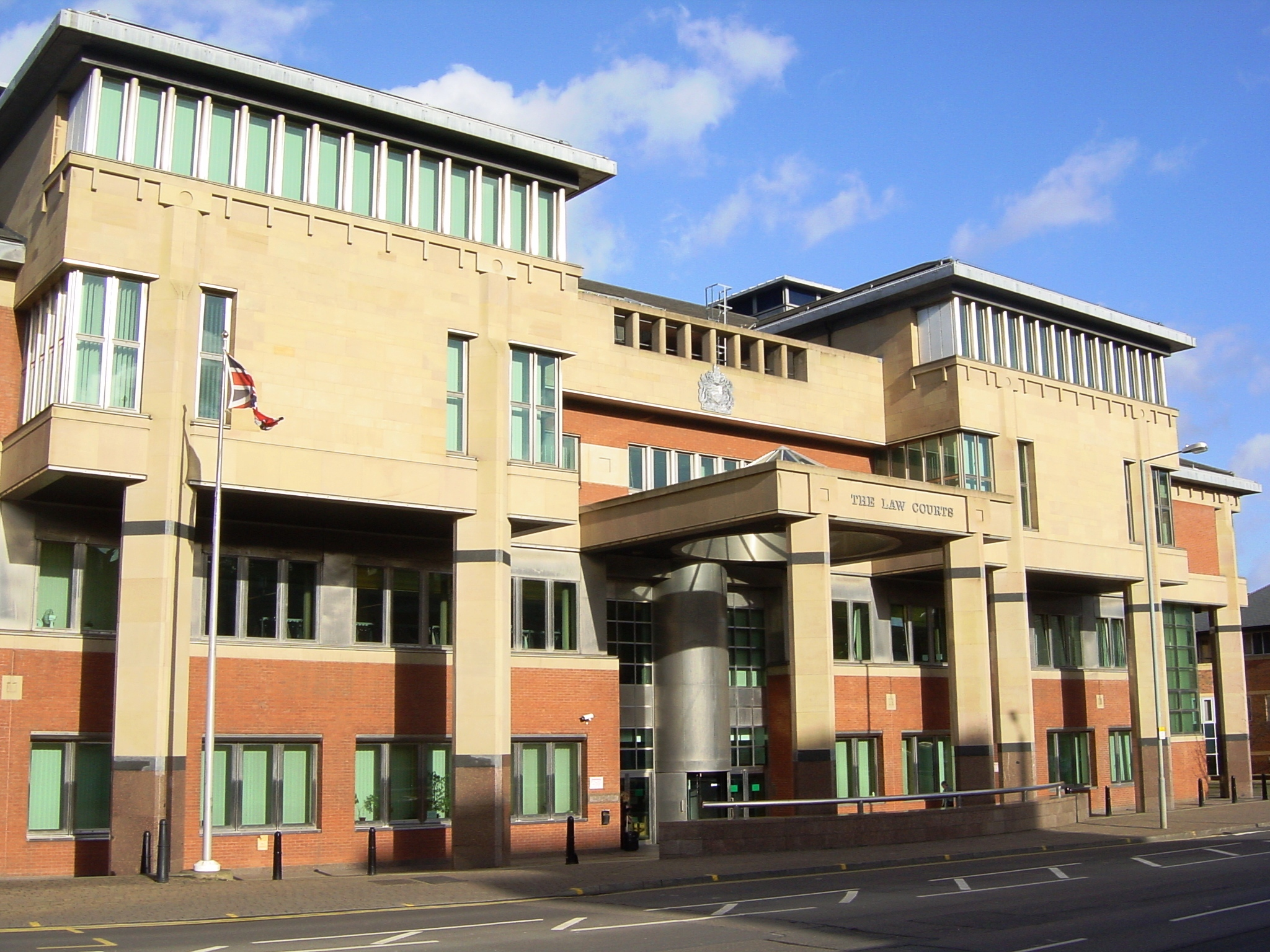
- Sheffield Law Courts

- Shown in South Yorkshire
- 53.3857°N 1.4687°W
- Location: West Bar, Sheffield

History
- Built: 1996

Site notes
- Architect: Napper Collerton
- Architectural style: Modernist style

The Sheffield Law Courts is a Crown Court venue, which deals with criminal cases, as well as a County Court venue, which deals with civil cases, in West Bar in Sheffield, South Yorkshire, England.

== History ==
Until the mid-1990s, all Crown Court cases were heard in the Sheffield Old Town Hall in Waingate. However, as the number of court cases in Sheffield grew, it became necessary to commission a more modern courthouse for criminal matters: the sloping site selected by the Lord Chancellor's Department had been occupied by the Surrey Music Hall, a venue which dated from 1849, and, after the music hall burnt down, the street was occupied by shops and public houses.

The new building was designed by Napper Collerton in the modern style, built by John Laing Construction in red brick and ashlar stone was completed in November 1995. It was officially opened by the Lord Chief Justice of England and Wales, Lord Taylor, on 17 May 1996. The design involved a symmetrical main frontage facing onto West Bar. The central bay, which was three storeys high, featured a two-storey portico formed by two large piers supporting an entablature and a parapet. Above the portico, there was a row of narrow windows at second floor level, surmounted by a parapet bearing a Royal coat of arms. The flanking bays, which were four storeys high, featured sections on the upper floors, which were stone-faced and cantilevered out over the pavement, while the outer bays were only three storeys in height and were faced in red brick with stone dressings. Internally, the building was laid out to accommodate 21 courtrooms.

Notable cases have included the trial and conviction, in November 2010, of five men in connection with the Rotherham child sexual exploitation scandal, the trial and conviction, in February 2021, of Pawel Relowicz for the murder of Libby Squire, and the trial and conviction, in June 2021, of Gary Allen for the murder of two women, 21 years apart.

The Princess Royal visited the Law Courts, in July 2021, to commemorate the 25th anniversary of their opening.
