= Humberside Police and Crime Commissioner =

- Incumbent; Jonathan Evison since 13 May 2021
- Police and crime commissioner of Humberside Police
- Reports to: Humberside Police and Crime Panel
- Appointer: Electorate of Humberside
- Term length: Four years
- Constituting instrument: Police Reform and Social Responsibility Act 2011
- Precursor: Humberside Police Authority
- Inaugural holder: Matthew Grove
- Formation: 22 November 2012
- Deputy: None
- Salary: £78,400
- Website: www.humberside-pcc.gov.uk

The Humberside Police and Crime Commissioner is the police and crime commissioner, an elected official tasked with setting out the way crime is tackled by Humberside Police in the former county of Humberside (now the unitary authorities of East Riding of Yorkshire, Kingston upon Hull, North Lincolnshire and North East Lincolnshire.)

The post was created in November 2012, following an election held on 15 November 2012, and replaced the Humberside Police Authority. The current incumbent is Jonathan Evison, who represents the Conservative Party, having retained the position in the May 2024 election.

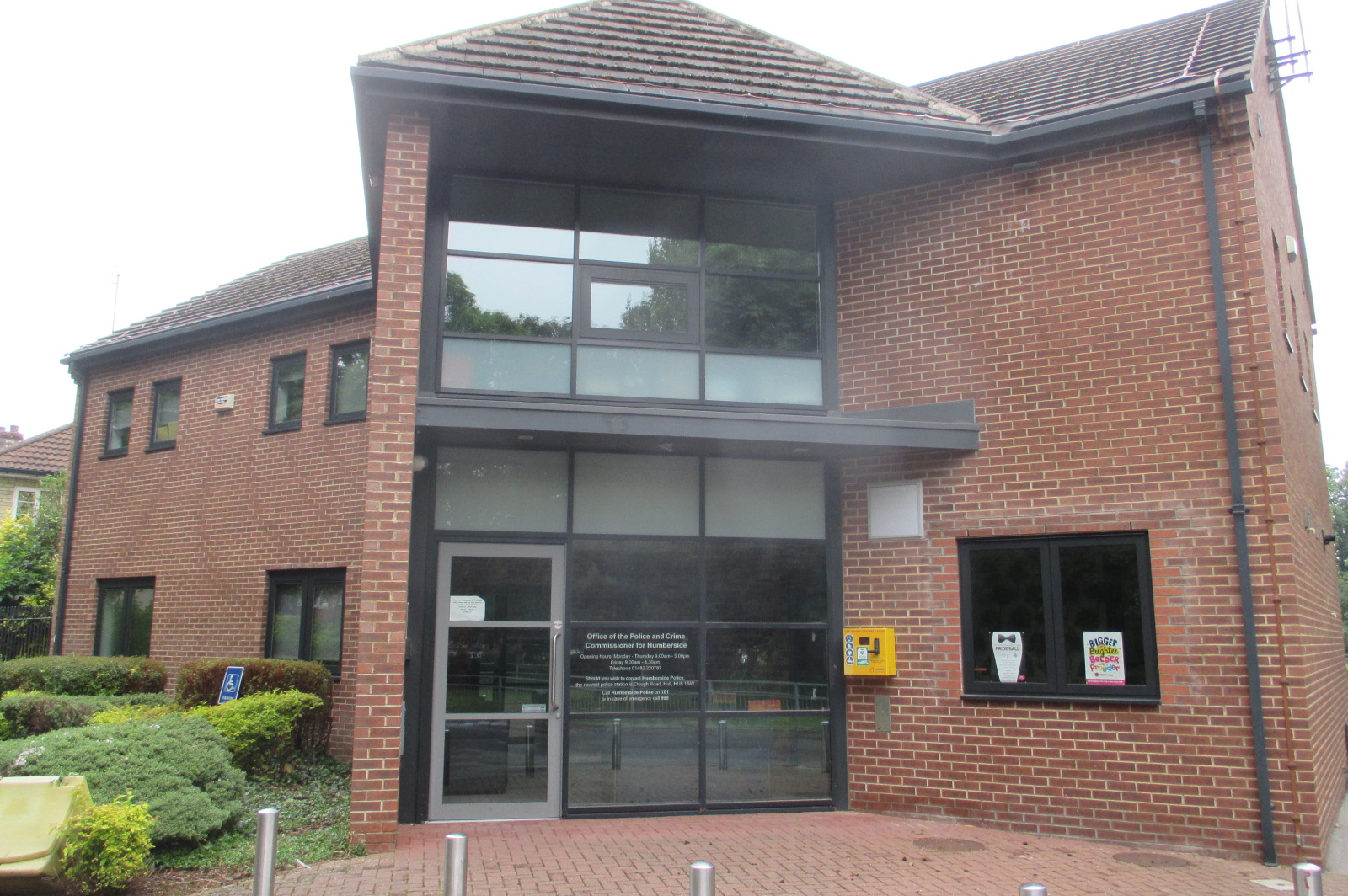
The commissioner's office at The Lawns, Cottingham

Under current plans the role of Police and Crime Commissioner will be abolished in 2028. In some areas of the country a strategic authority mayor may take over the functions of the Police and Crime Commissioner, but the Humberside area is split between Hull and East Yorkshire Combined Authority and Greater Lincolnshire Combined County Authority.

== List of Humberside Police and Crime Commissioners ==
Name	Political party	Dates in office
Matthew Grove	Conservative Party	22 November 2012 to 11 May 2016
Keith Hunter	Labour Party	12 May 2016 to 12 May 2021
Jonathan Evison	Conservative Party	13 May 2021 to present
