= Preventing the lawful burial of a body =

Criminal offence in England, Wales and Northern Ireland

Prevention of the lawful and decent burial of a dead body is an offence under the common law of England, Wales and Northern Ireland, as well as Hong Kong. Outside of homicide (to be an added count) it is quite rare. It is triable only by indictment and can be punished by, at maximum, life imprisonment, an unlimited fine or both.

An example of the offence, standalone, is detaining a body, for instance upon a claim for fees or a debt, refusing to deliver it to the executors for burial, or when entrusted with it for burial selling for dissection.

Burning a body instead of burying it was not illegal. It is now an offence to burn a body otherwise than in an approved crematorium.

Disposing of the dead body of a child with intent to conceal the birth (regardless as to when the child died) is a different offence; that under section 60 of the Offences Against the Person Act 1861.

== See also ==
- Concealment of a corpse, crime under Italian law
