= 2027 Cheshire and Warrington mayoral election =

English Mayoral Election

- 6 May 2027
Candidate	Dan Price	Ben Fletcher
Party	Labour Co-op	Conservative
Incumbent Mayor
Position established

The 2027 Cheshire and Warrington mayoral election will be held on 6 May 2027 to elect the inaugural Mayor of Cheshire and Warrington, who will head the Cheshire and Warrington Combined Authority. It will be held alongside the other local elections across the United Kingdom, including two of its three constituent councils, Cheshire East and Cheshire West & Chester.

== Candidates ==
=== Declared ===
- Dan Price, the incumbent Cheshire Police and Crime Commissioner, was selected as the Labour Party candidate.
- Ben Fletcher, a businessman, was selected as the Conservative Party candidate.
