= 2016 England and Wales police and crime commissioner elections =

2016 police and crime commissioner elections
- 5 May 2016

40 police and crime commissioners in England and Wales 1 Combined Authority Mayor with PCC powers
- Turnout: 26.6%(▲11.6%)

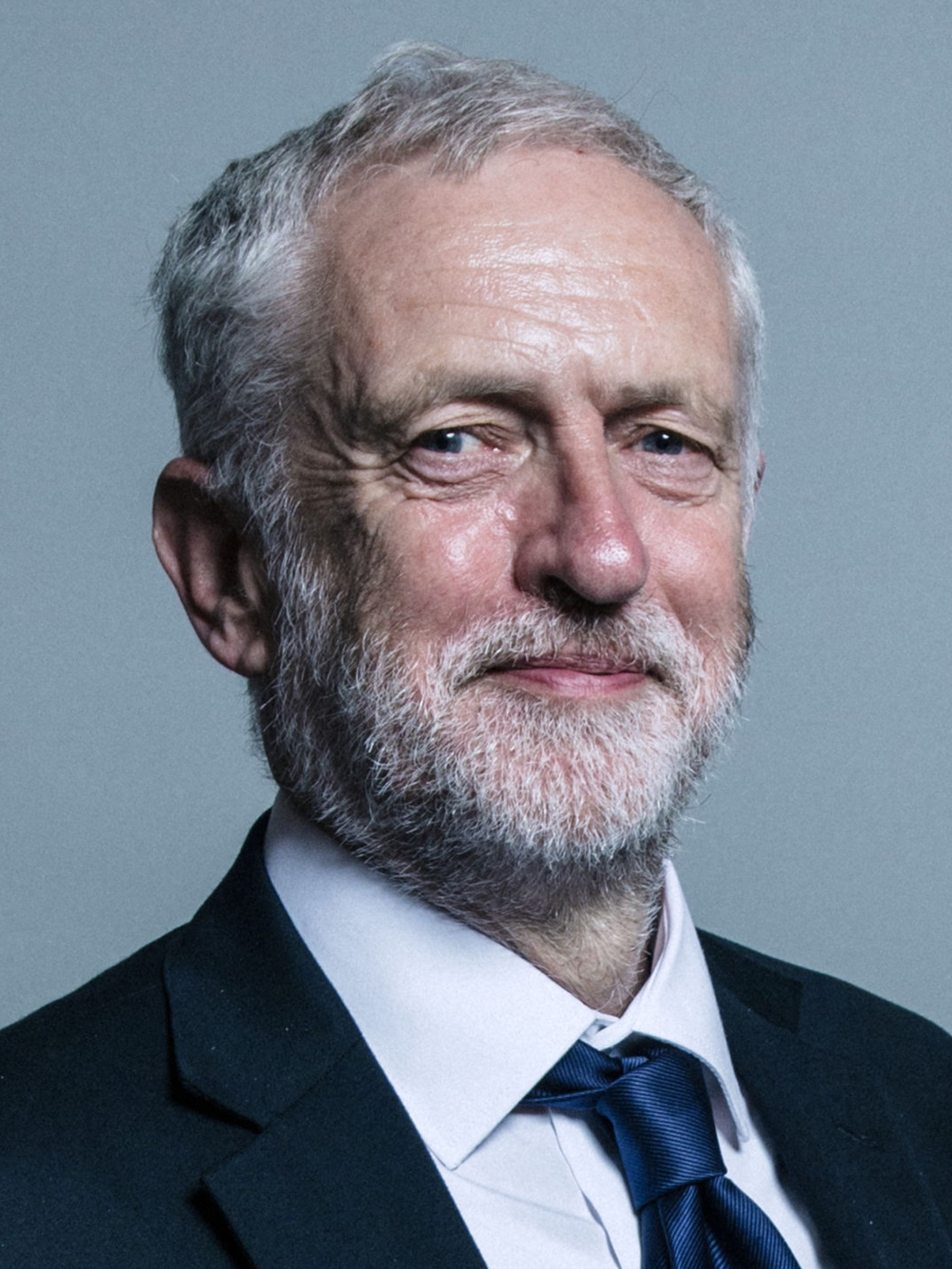

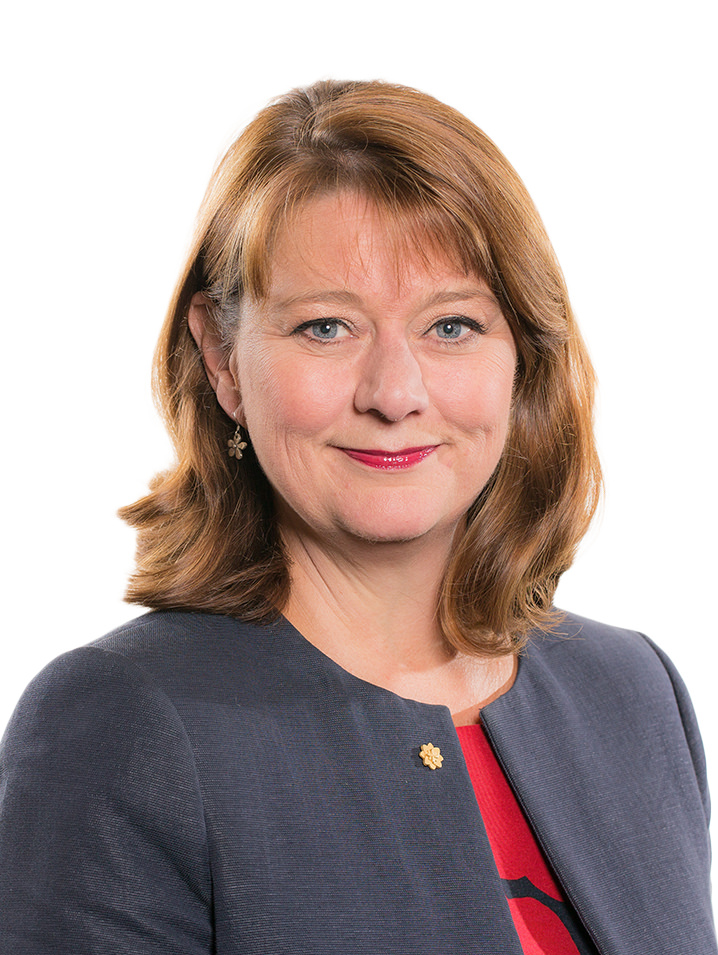
	First party	Second party	Third party
Leader	David Cameron	Jeremy Corbyn	Leanne Wood
Party	Conservative	Labour	Plaid Cymru
Leader since	6 December 2005	12 September 2015	16 March 2012
Last election	17 seats, 33.1% (Note: Not including Greater Manchester.)	12 seats, 33.9%	Did not stand
PCCs	20	16 (Note: Includes 1 Metro Mayor with PCC powers.)	2
Change	▲4	▲4	▲2
Popular vote	3,511,315	4,196,144	228,334
Share	30.6%	36.5%	2.0%
Swing	▼2.6%	▲2.6%	New party
- The 40 police force areas within England and Wales where elections were held. Colours denote the winning party, as shown in the main table of results.

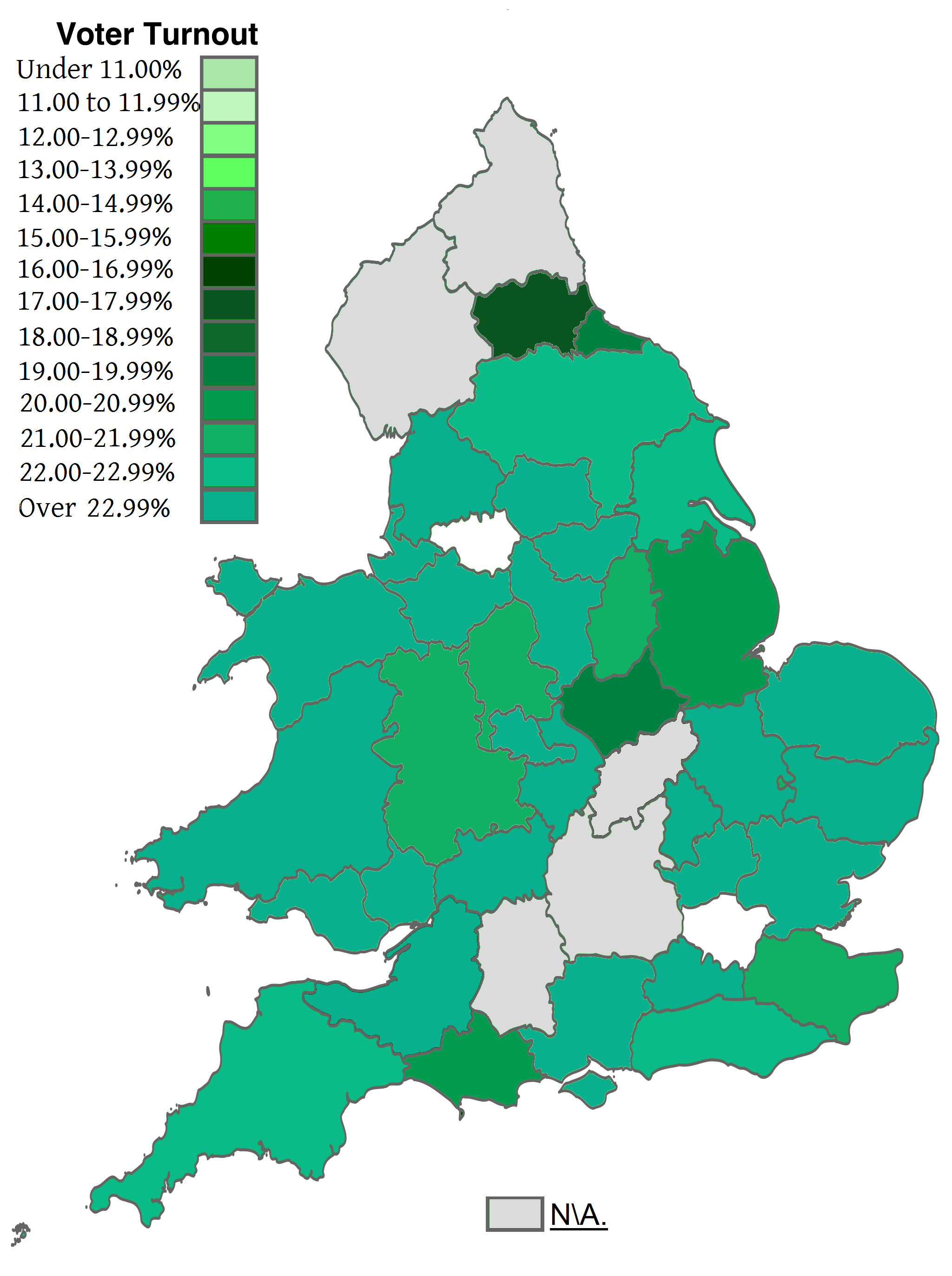
The England and Wales police and crime commission voter turnout in 2016. It was higher than in 2012, with an average of 23% to 26% voter turn out.

Elections of police and crime commissioners in England and Wales were held on 5 May 2016.

The elections were for 40 of the 43 territorial police forces in England and Wales using the supplementary vote system; the two police forces of Greater London are not involved (the elected Mayor of London is classed as the police and crime commissioner for the Metropolitan Police District, while the Court of Common Council fulfils the role for the City of London Police). There was no election for the Greater Manchester Police as the role of police and crime commissioner was due to be abolished in 2017 and replaced with the directly elected Mayor of Greater Manchester. Elections for police and crime commissioners do not take place in Scotland or Northern Ireland as policing and justice powers are devolved to the Scottish Parliament and Northern Ireland Assembly.

This was the second time police and crime commissioner elections had been held.

== Background ==
The election used the supplementary vote system: voters were instructed to mark the ballot paper with their first and second choices of candidate (although there were an unusually large number of spoilt ballots). If no candidate got a majority of first preference votes, the top two candidates went on to a second round in which second preference votes of the eliminated candidates were allocated to them to produce a winner. This is the system used to elect London's mayor. Section 57 of the Police Reform and Social Responsibility Act 2011 directs that the voting system is first past the post if there are only two candidates for a specific commissioner region.

The role of police and crime commissioner for the Greater Manchester Police was abolished in 2017 and replaced with the directly elected Mayor of Greater Manchester, who assumed the responsibilities of the police and crime commissioner. No election was therefore held in 2016 and Tony Lloyd remained as police and crime commissioner and interim mayor until the mayoral election took place in 2017.

== Parties standing ==
Both Labour and the Conservatives fielded candidates in all 40 elections, while UKIP fielded 34 candidates and the Liberal Democrats 30 candidates. The Green Party fielded seven candidates and the English Democrats four candidates. Plaid Cymru fielded candidates for all four Welsh seats. There were 29 other candidates; 25 stood as independents and four stood under other labels (one as Lincolnshire Independents and three as Zero Tolerance Policing ex Chief).

== Results summary ==
This table includes the results of elections for Combined Authority Mayors with Police and crime commissioner responsibilities which were held on the same day.

Party	Votes	Share	Change	Stood	Seats	Share	Change
Labour	4,196,144	36.5	+2.6	41	16	39.0	+4
Conservative	3,511,315	30.6	-2.6	41	20	48.8	+3
UKIP	1,312,044	11.4	+6.0	35	0	—	±0
Liberal Democrats	884,772	7.7	+1.7	31	0	—	±0
Independent	734,392	6.4	-11.5	26	3	7.3	-8
Green	264,630	2.3	+0.8	8	0	—	±0
Plaid Cymru	228,334	2.0	+2.0	4	2	4.9	+2
Zero Tolerance Policing	120,720	1.1	+0.6	3	0	—	-1
English Democrat	54,680	0.5	-0.3	4	0	—	±0
Women's Equality	53,055	0.5	+0.5	1	0	—	±0
Respect	37,007	0.3	+0.3	1	0	—	±0
Britain First	31,372	0.3	+0.3	1	0	—	±0
CISTA	20,537	0.2	+0.2	1	0	—	±0
Lincolnshire Independent	18,497	0.2	+0.2	1	0	—	±0
BNP	13,325	0.1	-0.3	1	0	—	±0
One Love	4,941	0.0	0.0	1	0	—	±0

Vote and seat changes are calculated with reference to the 2012 election, excluding Greater Manchester which was not up for election in 2016, due to being replaced by a Metro Mayor.

== England ==
=== Avon and Somerset Constabulary ===
Sue Mountstevens (Independent), incumbent, sought re-election.

- Kerry Barker (Labour), criminal law barrister.
- Chris Briton (Green), former Mayor of Wells City Council and probation officer.
- Paul Crossley (Liberal Democrat), Bath & North East Somerset Councillor and former Council leader.
- Aaron Foot (UKIP), a farm owner.
- Kevin Phillips (Independent), former Chairman of Avon and Somerset Police Federation
- Mark Weston (Conservative), leader of the Conservative group on Bristol City Council.

Avon and Somerset Police and Crime Commissioner election, 2016
Party	Candidate	1st round		2nd round			1st round votesTransfer votes, 2nd round
Party	Candidate	Total	Of round	Transfers	Total	Of round	1st round votesTransfer votes, 2nd round
Independent	Sue Mountstevens	82,708	26.1%	35,839	118,547	54.1%	
Labour	Kerry Barker	75,538	23.8%	25,027	100,565	45.9%	
Conservative	Mark Weston	61,335	19.3%				
UKIP	Aaron Foot	28,038	8.8%				
Liberal Democrats	Paul Crossley	23,429	7.4%				
Green	Chris Briton	23,414	7.4%				
Independent	Kevin Phillips	22,667	7.2%				
Turnout		317,129	26.0%				
Rejected ballots		8,629	2.7%				
Total votes		325,758	26.7%				
Registered electors		1,221,594					
Independent hold							

=== Bedfordshire Constabulary ===
Olly Martins (Labour and Co-operative), incumbent, sought re-election.

- Toni Bugle (English Democrats)
- Kathryn Holloway (Conservative), former television presenter.
- Duncan Strachan (UKIP)
- Linda Jack (Liberal Democrat),

Bedfordshire Police and Crime Commissioner election, 2016
Party	Candidate	1st round		2nd round			1st round votesTransfer votes, 2nd round
Party	Candidate	Total	Of round	Transfers	Total	Of round	1st round votesTransfer votes, 2nd round
Conservative	Kathryn Holloway	39,288	36.7%	8,109	47,397	51.6%	
Labour Co-op	Olly Martins	37,853	35.3%	6,661	44,514	48.4%	
Liberal Democrats	Linda Jack	12,413	11.6%				
UKIP	Duncan Strachan	11,012	10.3%				
English Democrat	Toni Bugle	6,569	6.1%				
Turnout		107,135	23.7%				
Rejected ballots		2,138					
Total votes		109,273					
Registered electors							
Conservative gain from Labour Co-op							

=== Cambridgeshire Constabulary ===
Sir Graham Bright (Conservative), incumbent, did not seek re-election.

- Jason Ablewhite (Conservative), leader of Huntingdonshire District Council.
- Dave Baigent (Labour), former firefighter.
- Rupert Moss-Eccardt (Liberal Democrat)
- Nick Clarke (UKIP), former leader of Cambridgeshire County Council.

Cambridgeshire Police and Crime Commissioner election, 2016
Party	Candidate	1st round		2nd round			1st round votesTransfer votes, 2nd round
Party	Candidate	Total	Of round	Transfers	Total	Of round	1st round votesTransfer votes, 2nd round
Conservative	Jason Ablewhite	63,614	36.2%	17,967	81,581	53.0%	
Labour	Dave Baigent	54,426	31.0%	18,054	72,480	47.0%	
UKIP	Nick Clarke	29,698	16.9%				
Liberal Democrats	Rupert Moss-Eccardt	27,884	15.9%				
Turnout		175,622	30.6%				
Rejected ballots							
Total votes							
Registered electors							
Conservative hold							

=== Cheshire Constabulary ===
John Dwyer (Conservative), incumbent, sought re-election.

- David Keane (Labour), member of Warrington Borough Council.
- Neil Lewis (Liberal Democrats), local entrepreneur and former member of the Economist Group.
- Jonathan Charles Starkey (UKIP), composer and pianist.

Cheshire Police and Crime Commissioner election, 2016
Party	Candidate	1st round		2nd round			1st round votesTransfer votes, 2nd round
Party	Candidate	Total	Of round	Transfers	Total	Of round	1st round votesTransfer votes, 2nd round
Labour	David Keane	72,497	39.8%	12,104	84,601	50.9%	
Conservative	John Dwyer	69,322	38.0%	12,330	81,652	49.1%	
UKIP	Jonathan Charles Starkey	21,991	12.0%				
Liberal Democrats	Neil Lewis	18,530	10.2%				
Turnout		182,340	23.3%				
Rejected ballots							
Total votes							
Registered electors							
Labour gain from Conservative							

=== Cleveland Police ===
Barry Coppinger (Labour), incumbent, sought re-election.

- Sultan Alam (independent)
- Steve Matthews (UKIP)
- Matthew Vickers (Conservative), member of Stockton-on-Tees Borough Council.

Cleveland Police and Crime Commissioner election, 2016
Party	Candidate	1st round		2nd round			1st round votesTransfer votes, 2nd round
Party	Candidate	Total	Of round	Transfers	Total	Of round	1st round votesTransfer votes, 2nd round
Labour	Barry Coppinger	32,733	41.0%	8,604	41,337	62.1%	
Conservative	Matthew Vickers	18,196	22.8%	7,033	25,229	37.9%	
UKIP	Steve Matthews	17,005	21.3%				
Independent	Sultan Alam	11,895	14.9%				
Turnout		79,829	19.7%				
Rejected ballots		1,706	2.1%				
Total votes		81,535					
Registered electors							
Labour hold							

=== Cumbria Constabulary ===
Richard Rhodes (Conservative), incumbent, did not seek re-election. Candidates include:

- Loraine Birchall (Liberal Democrat), a web and management consultant
- Peter McCall (Conservative), a former colonel in the British Army.
- Mary Robinson (Independent), member of Cumbria County Council
- Reg Watson (Labour), member of Cumbria County Council
- Michael Pye (UKIP)

Cumbria Police and Crime Commissioner election, 2016
Party	Candidate	1st round		2nd round			1st round votesTransfer votes, 2nd round
Party	Candidate	Total	Of round	Transfers	Total	Of round	1st round votesTransfer votes, 2nd round
Conservative	Peter McCall	32,569	34.4%	8,776	41,345	57.6%	
Labour	Reg Watson	22,768	24.1%	7,669	30,437	42.4%	
Liberal Democrats	Loraine Birchall	16,053	17.0%				
Independent	Mary Robinson	13,831	14.62%				
UKIP	Michael Pye	9,370	9.9%				
Turnout		94,591					
Rejected ballots		2,850					
Total votes		97,441	25.6%				
Registered electors							
Conservative hold							

=== Derbyshire Constabulary ===
Alan Charles, (Labour), incumbent, did not seek re-election.

- Richard Bright (Conservative), member of Derbyshire Dales District Council.
- Hardyal Dhindsa (Labour), member of Derby City Council.
- Stuart Yeowart (UKIP), former police officer.

Derbyshire Police and Crime Commissioner election, 2016
Party	Candidate	1st round		2nd round			1st round votesTransfer votes, 2nd round
Party	Candidate	Total	Of round	Transfers	Total	Of round	1st round votesTransfer votes, 2nd round
Labour	Hardyal Dhindsa	66,925	37.5%	11,933	78,858	50.5%	
Conservative	Richard Bright	61,741	34.6%	15,504	77,245	49.5%	
UKIP	Stuart Yeowart	30,381	17.0%				
Liberal Democrats	Tom Snowdon	19,492	10.9%				
Turnout		178,539	23.9%				
Rejected ballots							
Total votes							
Registered electors							
Labour hold							

=== Devon and Cornwall Police ===
Tony Hogg (Conservative), incumbent, did not seek re-election.

- Alison Hernandez (Conservative), former member of Torbay Council.
- Gareth Derrick (Labour), a former Commodore in the Royal Navy.
- Richard Younger-Ross (Liberal Democrat), former MP for Teignbridge.
- Jonathan Smith (UKIP), former police officer.
- William Morris (independent)
- Bob Spencer (independent)

Devon and Cornwall Police and Crime Commissioner election, 2016
Party	Candidate	1st round		2nd round			1st round votesTransfer votes, 2nd round
Party	Candidate	Total	Of round	Transfers	Total	Of round	1st round votesTransfer votes, 2nd round
Conservative	Alison Hernandez	69,354	24.4%	21,682	91,036	51.1%	
Labour	Gareth Derrick	66,519	23.4%	20,723	87,242	48.9%	
UKIP	Jonathan Smith	49,659	17.5%				
Independent	Bob Spencer	41,382	14.6%				
Liberal Democrats	Richard Younger-Ross	35,154	12.4%				
Independent	William Morris	22,395	7.9%				
Turnout		284,463	22.1%				
Rejected ballots		9,657	3.3%				
Total votes		294,120					
Registered electors							
Conservative hold							

=== Dorset Police ===
Martyn Underhill (Independent), incumbent, sought re-election.

- Patrick Canavan (Labour), former trade union regional officer.
- Andrew Graham (Conservative), a former lieutenant general in the British Army.
- Lester Taylor (UKIP).

Dorset Constabulary Police and Crime Commissioner election, 2016
Party	Candidate	1st round		2nd round			1st round votesTransfer votes, 2nd round
Party	Candidate	Total	Of round	Transfers	Total	Of round	1st round votesTransfer votes, 2nd round
Independent	Martyn Underhill	47,738	39.8%	18,922	66,660	66.7%	
Conservative	Andrew Graham	37,089	30.9%	7,369	44,458	33.3%	
UKIP	Lester Taylor	21,086	17.6%				
Labour	Patrick Canavan	20,169	16.8%				
Turnout		119,984	20.9%				
Rejected ballots		9,477	7.3%				
Total votes		129,461	22.5%				
Registered electors		574,361					
Independent hold							

=== Durham Constabulary ===
Ron Hogg (Labour), incumbent, sought re-election.

- Peter Cuthbertson (Conservative), lawyer.
- Craig Martin (Liberal Democrat), teacher.

Durham Constabulary Police and Crime Commissioner election, 2016
Party	Candidate	1st round		2nd round			1st round votesTransfer votes, 2nd round
Party	Candidate	Total	Of round	Transfers	Total	Of round	1st round votesTransfer votes, 2nd round
Labour	Ron Hogg	50,915	63.8%				
Conservative	Peter Cuthbertson	18,797	23.6%				
Liberal Democrats	Craig Martin	10,060	12.6%				
Turnout		79,772	17.4%				
Rejected ballots		1,569	1.9%				
Total votes		81,341	17.7%				
Registered electors		459,554					
Labour hold							

=== Essex Constabulary ===
Nick Alston (Conservative), incumbent, did not seek re-election.

- Roger Hirst (Conservative), deputy leader of Brentwood Borough Council.
- Kevin McNamara (Liberal Democrat)
- Bob Spink (UKIP), former MP for Castle Point.
- Martin Terry (Zero Tolerance Policing ex Chief)
- Chris Vince (Labour)

Essex Constabulary Police and Crime Commissioner election, 2016
Party	Candidate	1st round		2nd round			1st round votesTransfer votes, 2nd round
Party	Candidate	Total	Of round	Transfers	Total	Of round	1st round votesTransfer votes, 2nd round
Conservative	Roger Hirst	110,858	33.5%	25,090	135,948	56.7%	
UKIP	Bob Spink	80,832	24.4%	22,960	103,792	43.3%	
Labour	Chris Vince	65,325	19.7%				
Zero Tolerance Policing ex Chief	Martin Terry	43,128	13.0%				
Liberal Democrats	Kevin McNamara	30,804	9.3%				
Turnout		330,947	26.1%				
Rejected ballots		10,744	3.1%				
Total votes		341,691					
Registered electors		1,311,091					
Conservative hold							

=== Gloucestershire Constabulary ===
Martin Surl (Independent), incumbent, sought re-election

- Barry Kirby (Labour), Gloucestershire County Councillor.
- Will Windsor-Clive (Conservative), Gloucestershire County Councillor.

Gloucestershire Police and Crime Commissioner election, 2016
Party	Candidate	1st round		2nd round			1st round votesTransfer votes, 2nd round
Party	Candidate	Total	Of round	Transfers	Total	Of round	1st round votesTransfer votes, 2nd round
Independent	Martin Surl	57,447	40.7%	21,145	78,592	59.0%	
Conservative	Will Windsor-Clive	49,965	35.4%	4,602	54,567	41.0%	
Labour	Barry Kirby	33,825	24.0%				
Turnout		141,237	29.4%				
Rejected ballots							
Total votes							
Registered electors							
Independent hold							

=== Hampshire Constabulary ===
Simon Hayes (independent), incumbent, sought re-election

- Richard Adair (Liberal Democrats)
- Don Jerrard (independent)
- Michael Lane (Conservative)
- Robin Price (Labour)
- Roy Swales (UKIP), former police officer and former soldier
- Steve Watts (Zero Tolerance Policing ex Chief)

Hampshire Police and Crime Commissioner election, 2016
Party	Candidate	1st round		2nd round			1st round votesTransfer votes, 2nd round
Party	Candidate	Total	Of round	Transfers	Total	Of round	1st round votesTransfer votes, 2nd round
Conservative	Michael Lane	113,717	28.5%	40,273	153,990	63.7%	
Labour	Robin Price	63,747	16.0%	23,997	87,744	36.2%	
Independent	Simon Hayes	60,743	15.2%				
Liberal Democrats	Richard Adair	55,266	13.9%				
UKIP	Roy Swales	54,115	13.6%				
Zero Tolerance Policing ex Chief	Steve Watts	35,989	9.0%				
Independent	Don Jerrard	14,976	3.8%				
Turnout		398,553	28.0%				
Rejected ballots							
Total votes							
Registered electors							
Conservative gain from Independent							

=== Hertfordshire Constabulary ===
David Lloyd (Conservative), incumbent, sought re-election

- Mark Hughes (UKIP)
- Kerry Pollard (Labour), former MP for St Albans
- Chris White (Liberal Democrats)

Hertfordshire Police and Crime Commissioner election, 2016
Party	Candidate	1st round		2nd round			1st round votesTransfer votes, 2nd round
Party	Candidate	Total	Of round	Transfers	Total	Of round	1st round votesTransfer votes, 2nd round
Conservative	David Lloyd	100,262	42.3%	25,807	126,069	59.5%	
Labour	Kerry Pollard	64,978	27.4%	20,876	85,854	40.5%	
Liberal Democrats	Chris White	38,488	16.2%				
UKIP	Mark Hughes	33,575	14.2%				
Turnout		237,303	28.1%				
Rejected ballots							
Total votes							
Registered electors							
Conservative hold							

=== Humberside Police ===
Matthew Grove (Conservative), incumbent, sought re-election

- Denis Healy (Liberal Democrats)
- Keith Hunter (Labour and Co-operative)
- Michael Whitehead (UKIP)

Humberside Police and Crime Commissioner election, 2016
Party	Candidate	1st round		2nd round			1st round votesTransfer votes, 2nd round
Party	Candidate	Total	Of round	Transfers	Total	Of round	1st round votesTransfer votes, 2nd round
Labour Co-op	Keith Hunter	62,010	40.3%	14,118	76,128	59.5%	
Conservative	Matthew Grove	40,925	26.6%	10,832	51,757	40.5%	
UKIP	Michael Whitehead	27,434	17.8%				
Liberal Democrats	Denis Healy	23,451	15.3%				
Turnout		153,820	22.1%				
Rejected ballots							
Total votes							
Registered electors							
Labour Co-op gain from Conservative							

=== Kent Police ===
Ann Barnes (Independent), incumbent, did not seek re-election.

- Henry Bolton (UKIP)
- Tim Garbutt (Independent)
- Dave Naghi (Liberal Democrats)
- Tristan Osborne (Labour)
- Matthew Scott (Conservative)
- Steve Uncles (English Democrats), previously stood in 2012

Kent Police and Crime Commissioner election, 2016
Party	Candidate	1st round		2nd round			1st round votesTransfer votes, 2nd round
Party	Candidate	Total	Of round	Transfers	Total	Of round	1st round votesTransfer votes, 2nd round
Conservative	Matthew Scott	88,396	33.1%	16,162	104,558	54.3%	
UKIP	Henry Bolton	73,299	27.5%	14,679	87,978	45.7%	
Labour	Tris Osborne	50,978	19.1%				
Independent	Gurvinder Singh Sandher	26,221	9.8%				
Liberal Democrats	Dave Naghi	19,601	7.4%				
English Democrat	Steve Uncles	8,311	3.1%				
Turnout		266,806	21.0%				
Rejected ballots							
Total votes							
Registered electors							
Conservative gain from Independent							

=== Lancashire Constabulary ===
Clive Grunshaw was the incumbent Labour Party PCC.

- James Barker (UKIP)
- Andy Pratt (Conservative)
- Graham Roach (Liberal Democrats).

Lancashire Police and Crime Commissioner election, 2016
Party	Candidate	1st round		2nd round			1st round votesTransfer votes, 2nd round
Party	Candidate	Total	Of round	Transfers	Total	Of round	1st round votesTransfer votes, 2nd round
Labour	Clive Grunshaw	132,261	43.8%	20,453	152,714	56.2%	
Conservative	Andy Pratt	96,746	32.0%	22,195	118,941	43.8%	
UKIP	James Barker	49,987	16.5%				
Liberal Democrats	Graham Roach	23,164	7.7%				
Turnout		302,158	28.1%				
Rejected ballots							
Total votes							
Registered electors							
Labour hold							

=== Leicestershire Police ===
Air Chief Marshal Sir Clive Loader (Conservative), incumbent, did not seek re-election.

- Willy Bach, Baron Bach (Labour)
- Neil Bannister (Conservative)
- Sarah Hill (Liberal Democrat)
- David Sprason (UKIP)

Leicestershire Police and Crime Commissioner election, 2016
Party	Candidate	1st round		2nd round			1st round votesTransfer votes, 2nd round
Party	Candidate	Total	Of round	Transfers	Total	Of round	1st round votesTransfer votes, 2nd round
Labour	Willy Bach, Baron Bach	67,991	44.7%	10,197	78,188	57.3%	
Conservative	Neil Bannister	46,958	30.9%	11,347	58,305	42.7%	
Liberal Democrats	Sarah Hill	19,359	12.7%				
UKIP	David Sprason	17,815	11.7%				
Turnout		152,123	19.8%				
Rejected ballots							
Total votes							
Registered electors							
Labour gain from Conservative							

=== Lincolnshire Police ===
Alan Hardwick (Independent), incumbent, did not seek re-election.

- Victoria Ayling (UKIP), member of Lincolnshire County Council.
- Marc Jones (Conservative), member of Lincolnshire County Council.
- Lucinda Preston (Labour)
- Daniel Simpson (Lincolnshire Independent)

Lincolnshire Police and Crime Commissioner election, 2016
Party	Candidate	1st round		2nd round			1st round votesTransfer votes, 2nd round
Party	Candidate	Total	Of round	Transfers	Total	Of round	1st round votesTransfer votes, 2nd round
Conservative	Marc Jones	39,441	35.2%	8,592	48,033	56.2%	
UKIP	Victoria Ayling	28,583	25.5%	8,837	37,420	43.8%	
Labour	Lucinda Preston	25,475	22.8%				
Lincolnshire Independent	Daniel Simpson	18,497	16.5%				
Turnout		111,996	20.7%				
Conservative gain from Independent							

=== Merseyside Police ===
Jane Kennedy was the incumbent Labour Party PCC.

- Christopher Carubia (Liberal Democrats).
- David Robert Burgess-Joyce (Conservative)
- John Bernard Coyne (Green)

Merseyside Police and Crime Commissioner election, 2016
Party	Candidate	1st round		2nd round			1st round votesTransfer votes, 2nd round
Party	Candidate	Total	Of round	Transfers	Total	Of round	1st round votesTransfer votes, 2nd round
Labour	Jane Kennedy	186,661	61.8%				
Conservative	David Burgess-Joyce	54,000	17.9%				
Liberal Democrats	Christopher Carubia	34,625	11.5%				
Green	John Coyne	26,967	8.9%				
Turnout		302,253	30.2%				
Rejected ballots							
Total votes							
Registered electors							
Labour hold							

=== Norfolk Constabulary ===
Stephen Bett (Independent), incumbent, sought re-election,

- Lorne Green (Conservative)
- Martin Schmierer (Green), member of Norwich City Council
- Jacky Howe (Liberal Democrat)
- Chris Jones (Labour)
- David Moreland (UKIP)

Norfolk Police and Crime Commissioner election, 2016
Party	Candidate	1st round		2nd round			1st round votesTransfer votes, 2nd round
Party	Candidate	Total	Of round	Transfers	Total	Of round	1st round votesTransfer votes, 2nd round
Conservative	Lorne Green	42,928	27.8%	17,133	60,061	54.4%	
Labour	Chris Jones	37,141	24.0%	13,146	50,287	45.6%	
UKIP	David Moreland	27,030	17.5%				
Independent	Stephen Bett	25,527	16.5%				
Liberal Democrats	Jacky Howe	12,838	8.3%				
Green	Martin Schmierer	9,187	5.9%				
Turnout		154,651	23.2%				
Rejected ballots							
Total votes							
Registered electors							
Conservative gain from Independent							

=== Northamptonshire Constabulary ===
- Sam Watts (UKIP)
- Stephen Mold (Conservative)
- Kevin McKeever (Labour)

Northamptonshire Police and Crime Commissioner election, 2016Office of Northamptonshire Police and Crime Commissioner
Party	Candidate	1st round		2nd round			1st round votesTransfer votes, 2nd round
Party	Candidate	Total	Of round	Transfers	Total	Of round	1st round votesTransfer votes, 2nd round
Conservative	Stephen Mold	46,785	40.5%	11,390	58,175	54.2%	
Labour	Kevin McKeever	41,015	35.5%	8,146	49,161	45.8%	
UKIP	Sam Watts	27,708	23.9%				
Conservative hold							

=== Northumbria Police ===
- Vera Baird, incumbent (Labour)
- Stewart Hay (Conservative) - former DCI with the Force and Whitley Bay solicitor
- Melanie Hurst (UKIP)
- Jonathan Wallace (Liberal Democrat)

Northumbria Police and Crime Commissioner election, 2016
Party	Candidate	1st round		2nd round			1st round votesTransfer votes, 2nd round
Party	Candidate	Total	Of round	Transfers	Total	Of round	1st round votesTransfer votes, 2nd round
Labour	Vera Baird	180,479	55.3%				
Conservative	Stewart Hay	58,713	18.0%				
UKIP	Melanie Hurst	52,293	16.0%				
Liberal Democrats	Jonathan Wallace	34,757	10.7%				
Turnout		326,242					
Rejected ballots							
Total votes							
Registered electors							
Labour hold							

=== North Yorkshire Police ===
- James Blanchard (Liberal Democrat)
- Steve Howley (Labour)
- Julia Mulligan (Conservative)
- Mike Pannett (independent)

North Yorkshire Police and Crime Commissioner election, 2016
Party	Candidate	1st round		2nd round			1st round votesTransfer votes, 2nd round
Party	Candidate	Total	Of round	Transfers	Total	Of round	1st round votesTransfer votes, 2nd round
Conservative	Julia Mulligan	53,078	40.1%	11,940	65,018	59.2%	
Labour	Steve Howley	34,351	26.0%	10,408	44,759	40.8%	
Independent	Mike Pannett	30,984	23.4%				
Liberal Democrats	James Blanchard	13,856	10.5%				
Turnout		132,269	22.5%				
Rejected ballots		3,372	2.5%				
Total votes		135,641					
Registered electors		603,707					
Conservative hold							

=== Nottinghamshire Constabulary ===
- Paddy Tipping (Labour), incumbent and former MP
- Anthony Harper (Conservative)
- Tony Bates (independent)
- Jason Zadrozny (independent)
- Fran Loi (UKIP)

Nottinghamshire Police and Crime Commissioner election, 2016
Party	Candidate	1st round		2nd round			1st round votesTransfer votes, 2nd round
Party	Candidate	Total	Of round	Transfers	Total	Of round	1st round votesTransfer votes, 2nd round
Labour	Paddy Tipping	80,926	47.3%	8,823	89,749	61.3%	
Conservative	Anthony Harper	48,155	28.1%	7,950	56,105	38.7%	
UKIP	Fran Loi	20,320	11.9%				
Independent	Tony Bates	14,579	8.5%				
Independent	Jason Zadrozny	7,164	4.2%				
Turnout		171,144	21.4%				
Rejected ballots							
Total votes							
Registered electors							
Labour hold							

=== South Yorkshire Police ===
- David Allen (English Democrats)
- Alan Billings (Labour), incumbent, sought re-election
- Gavin Felton (UKIP)
- Joe Otten (Liberal Democrat)
- Ian Walker (Conservative)

South Yorkshire Police and Crime Commissioner election, 2016
Party	Candidate	1st round		2nd round			1st round votesTransfer votes, 2nd round
Party	Candidate	Total	Of round	Transfers	Total	Of round	1st round votesTransfer votes, 2nd round
Labour	Alan Billings	144,978	51.9%				
UKIP	Gavin Felton	57,062	20.4%				
Conservative	Ian Walker	29,904	10.7%				
Liberal Democrats	Joe Otten	28,060	10.1%				
English Democrat	David Allen	19,144	6.9%				
Turnout		279,148	28.4%				
Rejected ballots		9,724	3.4%				
Total votes		288,872					
Registered electors							
Labour hold							

=== Staffordshire Police ===
- George Adamson (Labour)
- Natalie Devaney (Independent)
- Harold Gregory (UKIP)
- Paul Woodhead (Green Party)

Staffordshire Police and Crime Commissioner election, 2016
Party	Candidate	1st round		2nd round			1st round votesTransfer votes, 2nd round
Party	Candidate	Total	Of round	Transfers	Total	Of round	1st round votesTransfer votes, 2nd round
Conservative	Matthew Ellis	63,123	36.26%	11,877	75,000	53.0%	
Labour	George Adamson	54,753	31.45%	11,760	66,513	47.0%	
UKIP	Harold Gregory	27,550	15.82%				
Independent	Natalie Devaney	22,155	12.72%				
Green	Paul Woodhead	6,527	3.75%				
Turnout		174,108	21.57%				
Rejected ballots							
Total votes							
Registered electors							
Conservative hold							

=== Suffolk Constabulary ===
- Terence Carter (Green Party)
- Helen Korfanty (Liberal Democrats)
- Tim Passmore, incumbent (Conservative)
- Cath Pickles (Labour)
- Simon Tobin (UKIP)

Suffolk Police and Crime Commissioner election, 2016
Party	Candidate	1st round		2nd round			1st round votesTransfer votes, 2nd round
Party	Candidate	Total	Of round	Transfers	Total	Of round	1st round votesTransfer votes, 2nd round
Conservative	Tim Passmore	57,167	43.72%	10,926	68,093	62.1%	
Labour	Cath Pickles	32,268	24.68%	9,363	41,631	38.9%	
UKIP	Simon Tobin	22,094	16.90%				
Liberal Democrats	Helen Korfanty	11,726	8.97%				
Green	Terence Carter	7,501	5.74%				
Turnout		130,756	24.47%				
Rejected ballots							
Total votes							
Registered electors							
Conservative hold							

=== Surrey Police ===
Surrey Police and Crime Commissioner election, 2016
Party	Candidate	1st round		2nd round			1st round votesTransfer votes, 2nd round
Party	Candidate	Total	Of round	Transfers	Total	Of round	1st round votesTransfer votes, 2nd round
Conservative	David Munro	82,125	35.33%	17,997	100,122	63.4%	
Zero Tolerance Policing ex Chief	Kevin Hurley	41,603	17.90%	16,078	57,681	36.6%	
Liberal Democrats	Paul Kennedy	29,933	12.88%				
Labour	Howard Kaye	28,005	12.05%				
UKIP	Julia Searle	24,055	10.35%				
Independent	Jamie Goldrick	14,007	6.03%				
Independent	Camille Juliff	12,746	5.48%				
Turnout		232,474	28.07%				
Rejected ballots		7,461	3.11%				
Total votes		239,935					
Registered electors		854,648					
Conservative gain from Zero Tolerance Policing ex Chief							

=== Sussex Police ===
- Katy Bourne (Conservative), incumbent, stood for re-election
- James Doyle (Green Party)
- Michael Jones (Labour)
- Patrick Lowe (UKIP)
- James Walsh (Liberal Democrat)

Sussex Police and Crime Commissioner election, 2016
Party	Candidate	1st round		2nd round			1st round votesTransfer votes, 2nd round
Party	Candidate	Total	Of round	Transfers	Total	Of round	1st round votesTransfer votes, 2nd round
Conservative	Katy Bourne	114,570	41.78%	24,765	139,335	61.7%	
Labour	Michael Jones	61,017	22.25%	25,375	86,392	38.3%	
UKIP	Patrick Lowe	43,075	15.71%				
Liberal Democrats	James Walsh	29,550	10.77%				
Green	James Doyle	26,038	9.49%				
Turnout		274,250	22.54%				
Rejected ballots							
Total votes							
Registered electors							
Conservative hold							

=== Thames Valley Police ===
- Laetisia Carter (Labour)
- John Howson (Liberal Democrats)
- Anthony Stansfeld (Conservative)
- Lea Trainer (UKIP)

Thames Valley Police and Crime Commissioner election, 2016
Party	Candidate	1st round		2nd round			1st round votesTransfer votes, 2nd round
Party	Candidate	Total	Of round	Transfers	Total	Of round	1st round votesTransfer votes, 2nd round
Conservative	Anthony Stansfeld	164,554	39.9%	37,842	202,396	54.0%	
Labour	Laetisia Carter	138,084	33.5%	34,633	172,717	46.0%	
Liberal Democrats	John Howson	59,975	14.45%				
UKIP	Lea Trainer	49,942	12.12%				
Turnout		412,155					
Rejected ballots							
Total votes			25.6%				
Registered electors							
Conservative hold							

=== Warwickshire Police ===
- Nicola Davies (Liberal Democrats)
- Rob Harris (UKIP)
- Julie Jackson (Labour)
- Philip Seccombe (Conservative)
- Ben Twomey (Independent)
- Dave Whitehouse (Independent)

Warwickshire Police and Crime Commissioner election, 2016
Party	Candidate	1st round		2nd round			1st round votesTransfer votes, 2nd round
Party	Candidate	Total	Of round	Transfers	Total	Of round	1st round votesTransfer votes, 2nd round
Conservative	Philip Seccombe	33,895	31.17%	9,313	43,208	55.2%	
Labour	Julie Jackson	27,725	25.50%	7,383	35,108	44.8%	
UKIP	Rob Harris	14,553	13.38%				
Independent	Dave Whitehouse	11,983	11.02%				
Liberal Democrats	Nicola Davies	11,509	10.58%				
Independent	Ben Twomey	9,076	8.35%				
Turnout		108,741	26.73%				
Rejected ballots							
Total votes							
Registered electors							
Conservative gain from Independent							

=== West Mercia Police ===
- John-Paul Campion (Conservative)
- Peter Jewell (UKIP)
- John Raine (Green Party)
- Margaret Rowley (Liberal Democrats)
- Barrie Sheldon (independent)
- Daniel Walton (Labour)

Conservative candidate John-Paul Campion won in the final round with 60.25% of the vote against Labour's Daniel Walton with 39.75%. This was a Conservative gain, as the incumbent Bill Longmore, who chose not to contest the election, had previously been elected as an independent.

West Mercia Police and Commissioner election, 2016
Party	Candidate	1st round		2nd round			1st round votesTransfer votes, 2nd round
Party	Candidate	Total	Of round	Transfers	Total	Of round	1st round votesTransfer votes, 2nd round
Conservative	John-Paul Campion	64,514	33.37%	19,105	83,619	60.3%	
Labour	Daniel Walton	40,870	21.14%	14,292	55,162	39.7%	
UKIP	Peter Jewell	32,719	16.92%				
Independent	Barrie Sheldon	27,986	14.48%				
Green	John Raine	14,323	7.41%				
Liberal Democrats	Margaret Rowley	12,914	6.68%				
Turnout			21.27%				
Rejected ballots		5,566	2.80%				
Total votes		198,892					
Registered electors							
Conservative gain from Independent							

=== West Midlands Police ===
- David Jamieson (Labour), incumbent, stood for re-election
- Pete Durnell (UKIP)
- Andy Flynn (independent)
- Les Jones (Conservative)

Labour's David Jamieson was re-elected in the final round with 63.3% of the vote against 36.7% for Conservative candidate Les Jones. This was a Labour hold, with the party winning both the initial contest for the post in 2012 and the by-election in 2014 won by Jamieson.

West Midlands Police and Crime Commissioner election, 2016
Party	Candidate	1st round		2nd round			1st round votesTransfer votes, 2nd round
Party	Candidate	Total	Of round	Transfers	Total	Of round	1st round votesTransfer votes, 2nd round
Labour	David Jamieson	275,672	49.88%	30,906	306,578	63.4%	
Conservative	Les Jones	142,651	25.81%	34,271	176,922	36.6%	
UKIP	Pete Durnell	93,851	16.98%				
Independent	Andy Flynn	40,478	7.31%				
Turnout		552,652	27.71%				
Rejected ballots		28,346	4.88%				
Total votes		580,998	29.13%				
Registered electors		1,993,998					
Labour hold							

=== West Yorkshire Police ===
- Mark Burns-Williamson (Labour), incumbent, stood for re-election
- Peter Corkindale (UKIP)
- Allan Doherty (Conservative)
- Stewart Golton (Liberal Democrats)
- Therese Muchewicz (English Democrats)

West Yorkshire Police and Crime Commissioner election, 2016
Party	Candidate	1st round		2nd round			1st round votesTransfer votes, 2nd round
Party	Candidate	Total	Of round	Transfers	Total	Of round	1st round votesTransfer votes, 2nd round
Labour	Mark Burns-Williamson	260,271	49.67%	35,543	295,814	66.3%	
Conservative	Allan Doherty	119,338	22.78%	30,788	150,126	33.7%	
UKIP	Peter Corkindale	74,748	14.27%				
Liberal Democrats	Barry Golton	48,963	9.34%				
English Democrat	Therese Muchewicz	20,656	3.94%				
Turnout		523,976	33.16%				
Rejected ballots							
Total votes							
Registered electors							
Labour hold							

=== Wiltshire Police ===
- Angus Macpherson (Conservative), incumbent, sought re-election
- Brian Mathew (Liberal Democrats)
- John Short (UKIP)
- Kevin Small (Labour)

Wiltshire Police and Crime Commissioner election, 2016
Party	Candidate	1st round		2nd round			1st round votesTransfer votes, 2nd round
Party	Candidate	Total	Of round	Transfers	Total	Of round	1st round votesTransfer votes, 2nd round
Conservative	Angus Macpherson	56,605	46.20%	12,017	68,622	63.5%	
Labour	Kevin Small	28,166	22.99%	11,199	39,365	36.5%	
Liberal Democrats	Brian Mathew	19,294	15.75%				
UKIP	John Short	18,434	15.05%				
Turnout		122,499					
Rejected ballots		3,696	2.93				
Total votes		126,195	24.7				
Registered electors							
Conservative hold							

== Wales ==
=== Dyfed-Powys Police ===
Christopher Salmon (Conservative), incumbent, sought re-election.

- Richard Church (Liberal Democrat), former member of Northamptonshire County Council.
- William Davies (independent)
- Dafydd Llywelyn (Plaid Cymru), university lecturer.
- Kevin Madge (Labour)
- Des Parkinson (UKIP), a former police chief superintendent.

Dyfed-Powys Police and Crime Commissioner election, 2016
Party	Candidate	1st round		2nd round			1st round votesTransfer votes, 2nd round
Party	Candidate	Total	Of round	Transfers	Total	Of round	1st round votesTransfer votes, 2nd round
Plaid Cymru	Dafydd Llywelyn	52,469	28.0%	22,689	75,158	55.9%	
Conservative	Christopher Salmon	47,093	25.1%	12,209	59,302	44.1%	
Labour	Kevin Madge	34,799	18.6%				
UKIP	Des Parkinson	20,870	11.1%				
Liberal Democrats	Richard Church	20,725	11.1%				
Independent	Edmund Davies	11,561	6.2%				
Turnout		187,517	49.1%				
Rejected ballots							
Total votes							
Registered electors							
Plaid Cymru gain from Conservative							

=== Gwent Police ===
Ian Johnston (Independent), incumbent, did not seek re-election.

- Darren Jones (Plaid Cymru), former councillor and council cabinet member
- Louise Brown (Conservative)
- Jeff Cuthbert (Labour and Co-operative), Welsh Assembly Member for Caerphilly

Gwent Police and Crime Commissioner election, 2016
Party	Candidate	1st round		2nd round			1st round votesTransfer votes, 2nd round
Party	Candidate	Total	Of round	Transfers	Total	Of round	1st round votesTransfer votes, 2nd round
Labour Co-op	Jeff Cuthbert	76,893	46.4%	19,137	96,030	61.6%	
Conservative	Louise Brown	50,985	30.8%	8,946	59,931	38.4%	
Plaid Cymru	Darren Jones	37,916	22.9%				
Turnout			42.0%				
Rejected ballots							
Total votes							
Registered electors							
Labour Co-op gain from Independent							

=== North Wales Police ===
- Arfon Jones (Plaid Cymru)
- David Taylor (Labour)
- Simon Wall (UKIP)
- Matt Wright (Conservatives)

North Wales Police and Crime Commissioner election, 2016
Party	Candidate	1st round		2nd round			1st round votesTransfer votes, 2nd round
Party	Candidate	Total	Of round	Transfers	Total	Of round	1st round votesTransfer votes, 2nd round
Plaid Cymru	Arfon Jones	67,179	31.5%	23,049	90,228	58.2%	
Labour	David Taylor	54,892	25.7%	9,972	64,864	41.8%	
Conservative	Matt Wright	42,005	19.7%				
UKIP	Simon Wall	25,943	12.2%				
Independent	Julian Sandham	23,487	11.0%				
Turnout		213,506	41.6%				
Rejected ballots							
Total votes							
Registered electors							
Plaid Cymru gain from Independent							

=== South Wales Police ===
- Mike Baker (Independent) who had contested the seat in 2012
- Timothy Davies (Conservative)
- Alun Michael (Labour and Co-operative), incumbent, is seeking re-election
- Linet Purcell (Plaid Cymru)
- Judith Woodman (Liberal Democrat)

South Wales Police and Crime Commissioner election, 2016
Party	Candidate	1st round		2nd round			1st round votesTransfer votes, 2nd round
Party	Candidate	Total	Of round	Transfers	Total	Of round	1st round votesTransfer votes, 2nd round
Labour Co-op	Alun Michael	161,529	40.9%	43,345	204,874	68.1%	
Conservative	Timothy Davies	70,799	17.9%	25,261	96,060	31.9%	
Plaid Cymru	Linet Purcell	70,770	17.9%				
Independent	Mike Baker	67,454	17.1%				
Liberal Democrats	Judith Woodman	24,438	6.2%				
Turnout		394,990	42.5%				
Rejected ballots							
Total votes							
Registered electors							
Labour Co-op hold							

== Changes between 2016 and 2020 ==
=== Northumbria Police by-election 2019 ===
Caused by the resignation of incumbent Vera Baird (Labour)

Northumbria Police and Crime Commissioner election, 2019
Party	Candidate	1st round		2nd round			1st round votesTransfer votes, 2nd round
Party	Candidate	Total	Of round	Transfers	Total	Of round	1st round votesTransfer votes, 2nd round
Labour Co-op	Kim McGuinness	58,355	37.9%	8,977	67,332	52.2%	
Independent	Georgina Hill	33,704	21.9%	27,929	61,633	47.8%	
Conservative	Robbie Moore	33,267	21.6%				
Liberal Democrats	Jonathan Wallace	28,623	18.6%				
Turnout		155,990	15.0%				
Rejected ballots		2,041	1.3%				
Total votes		153,949					
Registered electors		1,041,562					
Labour hold							
