= Peter McCall (police commissioner) =

British conservative politician

Colonel Peter McCall

Cumbria Police, Fire and Crime Commissioner (Note: Police and Crime Commissioner (PCC) until April 2023.)
- In office 12 May 2016 – 8 May 2024
- Preceded by: Richard Rhodes
- Succeeded by: David Allen

Personal details
- Party: Conservative
- Education: University of Strathclyde
- Website: www.petermccall.org.uk

Military service
- Branch/service: British Army
- Years of service: 1982–2016
- Rank: Colonel
- Commands: Royal Logistic Corps
- Battles/wars: Cold War; Bosnian War

Colonel Peter Joseph McCall is a British conservative politician and former British Army officer. He was elected in 2016 as the Cumbria Police and Crime Commissioner and re-elected in 2021. In April 2023 he became the Cumbria Police, Fire and Crime Commissioner following the abolition of Cumbria County Council. He did not stand for re-election and retired in May 2024.

== Early life and education ==
McCall was educated at The Nelson Thomlinson School, a comprehensive school in Wigton, Cumbria. He became head boy of his school. From 1979 to 1982, he studied at the University of Strathclyde, graduating with a Bachelor of Arts (BA) degree.

== Career ==
=== Military career ===
On 3 September 1982, McCall was commissioned as a second lieutenant (on probation) (university candidate). In May 1983, his commission was confirmed and he was promoted to lieutenant with seniority from 3 September 1982. He was promoted to captain on 12 October 1986. On 15 July 1987, he transferred from a Short Service Commission to a Regular Commission, thereby allowing him to serve in the army until retirement age.

On 30 September 1992, having attended Staff College, McCall was promoted to major. He saw active service during the Bosnian War, where he commanded a squadron in Bosnia. On 30 June 1999, he was promoted to lieutenant colonel. On 30 June 2007, he was promoted to colonel. From June 2009 to November 2011, he served as the Regimental Colonel of the Royal Logistic Corps (IE its professional head). From 2012 to 2015, he was HR Director for the Royal Logistic Corps and the Royal Electrical and Mechanical Engineers (REME).

On 6 April 2016, McCall retired from the British Army.

In November 2019, McCall was appointed as Honorary Colonel of Cumbria Army Cadet Force.

=== Political career ===
On 5 May 2016, McCall was elected the Police and Crime Commissioner of Cumbria Constabulary. He received 32,569 votes in the first round and then won with 41,345 votes in the next round after second preference votes were added. The turnout was 25.61%. He was re-elected on 6 May 2021 with 56,753 first preference votes (53.57%) in the first round on a turnout of 27.6%.
