= 2016 Woking Borough Council election =

2016 UK local government election

← 2015	5 May 2016	2018 →

All 30 seats to Woking Borough Council 16 seats needed for a majority
	First party	Second party	Third party
Party	Conservative	Liberal Democrats	Labour
Seats won	17	7	3
Seat change	–7	–2	+1
Popular vote	34,980	20,707	7,647
Percentage	47.51%	28.13%	10.39%
Swing	—	—	—
	Fourth party	Fifth party	Sixth party
Party	Independent	UKIP	Green
Seats won	3	0	0
Seat change	+2	—	—
Popular vote	3,982	3,956	2,351
Percentage	5.41%	5.37%	3.19%
Swing	—	—	—
- Results of the 2016 Woking Borough Council election

The 2016 Woking Borough Council election took place on 5 May 2016 to elect members of Woking Borough Council in England. This was on the same day as other elections across the UK and the Police and Crime Commissioner election for Surrey Police.

Boundary changes had included a shrinking of the council from 36 councillors to 30 councillors, and all 30 council seats in the 10 new wards were up for election. In each ward, 3 candidates were elected, with the leading candidate in each ward being elected for 4 years, the second-placed candidate being elected for 3 years and the third-placed candidate being elected for 2 years. As a result, there will be no borough elections in 2017, but a third of the council will be due for re-election in each of 2018, 2019 and 2020.

== Summary ==
Prior to this all-out election on new ward boundaries, the Conservatives had a strong majority on the council, with 24 seats compared to 9 for the Liberal Democrats, 2 Labour councillors, and one Independent.

Despite remaining the largest party by a clear margin of 10 seats over their nearest rivals, the result was considered slightly disappointing for the Conservatives, who saw their council majority over all other parties reduced to four seats.

Independent candidates won all three seats in Byfleet, defeating sitting LibDem councillor and former Mayor Anne Roberts and the Conservative councillors Gary Elson and Richard Wilson. The Liberal Democrats won all three seats in the new Hoe Valley ward and shared the spoils with the Conservatives in Goldsworth Park, Mount Hermon and St Johns. Labour took all three seats in the Canalside Ward (where the Conservative council was taking forward a controversial redevelopment and regeneration scheme in the Sheerwater area). However, the Conservatives did rack up four extremely convincing wins (with majorities in each ward of c.1,000 votes) in the wards of Heathlands, Horsell, Knaphill and Pyrford.

There were very close battles, resulting in three ‘split wards’, in Goldsworth Park, Mount Hermon and St Johns, but, arguably, no results were closer than those in the Mount Hermon ward, where Conservative councillor Carl Thomson and Liberal Democrat councillor Liam Lyons both lost their seats, and where only 64 votes separated the second and fifth placed candidates, and just 22 votes separated those who placed second and fourth.

In the election, the Conservatives and the Liberal Democrats were the only two parties to field a full slate of thirty candidates. UKIP stood one candidate in each of the ten wards, and two in Canalside, for a total of eleven candidates in all. Labour nominated sixteen candidates in total, but stood them across just seven out of the ten wards. The Greens fielded one candidate in each of seven wards, for a total of seven nominations. The best result for the Greens was in Knaphill, where their candidate James Brierley was the runner-up to the three successful Conservative candidates.

After the election, long-standing council leader Councillor John Kingsbury continued in office with the support of the Conservative group. Councillor Kingsbury later announced his retirement as council leader in 2017, and stood down as a councillor at the 2018 local elections.

Woking Borough Council election, 2016
Party	Seats	Gains	Losses	Net gain/loss	Seats %	Votes %	Votes	+/−
Conservative	17	N/A	N/A	–7	56.66%	47.51%	34,980	—
Liberal Democrats	7	N/A	N/A	–2	23.33%	28.13%	20,707	—
Labour	3	N/A	N/A	+1	10%	10.39%	7,647	—
Independent	3	N/A	N/A	+2	10%	5.41%	3,982	—
UKIP	0	N/A	N/A	0	0%	5.37%	3,956	—
Green	0	N/A	N/A	0	0%	3.19%	2,351	—
Totals	30	N/A	N/A	–6	100%	100%	73,623	—

== Ward by ward ==
=== Byfleet and West Byfleet ===
Byfleet and West Byfleet (3 seats)
Party	Candidate	Votes	%
Independent	John Edwin Bond (elected for 4 years)	1,474	
Independent	Amanda Jayne Boote (elected for 3 years)	1,385	
Independent	Mary Ann Bridgeman (elected for 2 years)	1,123	
Conservative	Richard Arthur Gillard Wilson	1,011	
Conservative	Gary William Elson	929	
Conservative	Pauline Mary Hedges	922	
Liberal Democrats	Anne Elizabeth Roberts	724	
Liberal Democrats	Andrew Nigel Grimshaw	582	
Liberal Democrats	Karon Jane Read	534	
UKIP	Neil James Willetts	295	
Registered electors		8,316	
Turnout		3341	40.18%
Independent win (new seat)			
Independent win (new seat)			
Independent win (new seat)			

=== Canalside ===
Canalside (3 seats)
Party	Candidate	Votes	%
Labour	Tahir Aziz (elected for 4 years)	1,106	
Labour	Mohammad Ali (elected for 3 years)	1,071	
Labour	Mohammad Ilyas Raja (elected for 2 years)	1,060	
Conservative	Paula Jane Marcus	868	
Conservative	Matthew Howard Provost	829	
Conservative	Colin Patrick Scott	807	
UKIP	David Simon Roe	383	
UKIP	Judith Diana	332	
Liberal Democrats	Rebecca Elisabeth Whale	300	
Green	Christopher David Calvin Dykes	281	
Liberal Democrats	Gareth Davies	279	
Liberal Democrats	Norman Grenville Johns	230	
Registered electors		7,517	
Turnout		2862	38.07%
Labour win (new seat)			
Labour win (new seat)			
Labour win (new seat)			

=== Goldsworth Park ===
Goldsworth Park (3 seats)
Party	Candidate	Votes	%
Liberal Democrats	Ann-Marie Barker (elected for 4 years)	894	
Liberal Democrats	Ian Eastwood (elected for 3 years)	885	
Conservative	Chitra Rana (elected for 2 years)	858	
Conservative	Laura Ashall	847	
Liberal Democrats	James Richard Sanderson	806	
Conservative	Rizwan Shah	707	
Labour	John Scott-Morgan	366	
UKIP	Troy de Leon	356	
Labour	William Eric Owen	327	
Labour	Robina Shaheen	327	
Green	Eve Catherine Carnall	219	
Registered electors		7,036	
Turnout		2510	35.67%
Liberal Democrats win (new seat)			
Liberal Democrats win (new seat)			
Conservative win (new seat)			

=== Heathlands ===
Heathlands (3 seats)
Party	Candidate	Votes	%
Conservative	Kevin Mark Davis (elected for 4 years)	1,519	
Conservative	Ayesha Azad (elected for 3 years)	1,462	
Conservative	Robert John Kingsbury (elected for 2 years)	1,375	
Liberal Democrats	Margaret Marion Hill	586	
Liberal Democrats	Henry David Kay	555	
Liberal Democrats	Alison Jane Sanderson	482	
Green	Anna Katharine Wright	380	
UKIP	Richard Peter Farr Squire	336	
Labour	John Martin	316	
Registered electors		7,014	
Turnout		2711	38.65%
Conservative win (new seat)			
Conservative win (new seat)			
Conservative win (new seat)			

=== Hoe Valley ===
Hoe Valley (3 seats)
Party	Candidate	Votes	%
Liberal Democrats	Will Forster (elected for 4 years)	1,126	
Liberal Democrats	Louise Mary Nell Morales (elected for 3 years)	1,022	
Liberal Democrats	Deborah Elizabeth Hughes (elected for 2 years)	967	
Conservative	Nathalie Bourne	614	
Conservative	John Frederick Lawrence	567	
Conservative	Daryl Martin Smith	506	
UKIP	Jim Gore	322	
Labour	Nigel Peter Jackson	276	
Labour	Frances Louise Carpenter	275	
Labour	Christopher David Martin	249	
Registered electors		6,292	
Turnout		2352	37.38%
Liberal Democrats win (new seat)			
Liberal Democrats win (new seat)			
Liberal Democrats win (new seat)			

=== Horsell ===
Horsell (3 seats)
Party	Candidate	Votes	%
Conservative	Beryl Ann Hunwicks (elected for 4 years)	1,744	
Conservative	Colin Sidney Kemp (elected for 3 years)	1,651	
Conservative	Anne Elizabeth Murray (elected for 2 years)	1,569	
Liberal Democrats	Anthony Laurence Kremer	871	
Liberal Democrats	Rosemary Peta Johnson	758	
Liberal Democrats	Samuel David Watts	519	
UKIP	Stephen Anthony Herbert	366	
Labour	Elizabeth Anne Evans	348	
Green	Lucy Rhodes Dykes	310	
Labour	Colin Robert Bright	285	
Labour	Thomas George Willis	244	
Registered electors		7,177	
Turnout		3134	43.67%
Conservative win (new seat)			
Conservative win (new seat)			
Conservative win (new seat)			

=== Knaphill ===
Knaphill (3 seats)
Party	Candidate	Votes	%
Conservative	Sajjad Hussain (elected for 4 years)	1,587	
Conservative	Melanie Anne Whitehand (elected for 3 years)	1,333	
Conservative	Deborah Harlow (elected for 2 years)	1,293	
Green	James William Brierley	407	
Liberal Democrats	Vanessa Ellicott	399	
Liberal Democrats	David Geoffrey Barker	394	
Labour	Richard Peter Ford	384	
UKIP	Terence John Knight	372	
Liberal Democrats	Syed Waqar Haider Jaffri	223	
Registered electors		7,506	
Turnout		2591	34.52%
Conservative win (new seat)			
Conservative win (new seat)			
Conservative win (new seat)			

=== Mount Hermon ===
Mount Hermon (3 seats)
Party	Candidate	Votes	%
Conservative	David John Bittleston (elected for 4 years)	1,289	
Liberal Democrats	Ian Johnson (elected for 3 years)	1,168	
Conservative	Mark Russell John Pengelly (elected for 2 years)	1,159	
Conservative	Carl William Thomson	1,146	
Liberal Democrats	Liam Stuart Lyons	1,104	
Liberal Democrats	Sinclair Aubrey Webster	980	
Green	John Robert George Parkin	379	
UKIP	Lynda Mary Sage	229	
Registered electors		7,389	
Turnout		2782	37.65%
Conservative win (new seat)			
Liberal Democrats win (new seat)			
Conservative win (new seat)			

=== Pyrford ===
Pyrford (3 seats)
Party	Candidate	Votes	%
Conservative	Graham Gray Chrystie (elected for 4 years)	1,892	
Conservative	Ashley Christian Lawrence Bowes (elected for 3 years)	1,853	
Conservative	Rashid Mohammed (elected for 2 years)	1,433	
Liberal Democrats	Ian Michael Lachowicz	579	
UKIP	Robin Deller Millner	523	
Labour	Misbah Zahid	521	
Labour	David Williams	492	
Liberal Democrats	Richard Peter John Sanderson	497	
Liberal Democrats	Guy Tuson Cosnahan	373	
Registered electors		7,346	
Turnout		3172	43.18%
Conservative win (new seat)			
Conservative win (new seat)			
Conservative win (new seat)			

=== St Johns ===
St Johns (3 seats)
Party	Candidate	Votes	%
Conservative	Graham Stephen Cundy (elected for 4 years)	1,174	
Conservative	Hilary Jane Addison (elected for 3 years)	1,098	
Liberal Democrats	Kenneth Howard (elected for 2 years)	1,052	
Liberal Democrats	Christina Judith Liddington	1,043	
Conservative	Paul Graham Smith	938	
Liberal Democrats	Christopher James Took	775	
UKIP	Timothy Martin Read	442	
Green	Joel Benjamin Street	375	
Registered electors		7,264	
Turnout		2650	36.48%
Conservative win (new seat)			
Conservative win (new seat)			
Liberal Democrats win (new seat)			
