= Richard Rhodes (police commissioner) =

Cumbria Police and Crime Commissioner
- In office 22 November 2012 – 11 May 2016
- Preceded by: Office created
- Succeeded by: Peter McCall

Personal details
- Born: 20 April 1942 (age 83)
- Party: Conservative
- Education: Rossall School
- Alma mater: St John's College, Durham
- Occupation: Police commissioner, politician, teacher

Richard Rhodes (born 20 April 1942) is a British politician and former teacher. From 2012 to 2016, he was the Conservative Cumbria Police and Crime Commissioner.

== Early life and education ==
Rhodes was born on 20 April 1942. He was educated at Rossall School, a private school in Rossall, Lancashire. He studied at St John's College, Durham, and graduated with a Bachelor of Arts (BA) from the University of Durham in 1963.

== Political career ==
On 15 November 2012, Rhodes was elected the Police and Crime Commissioner for Cumbria Constabulary; he stood as the Conservative Party candidate. He is the first person to hold the post, and defeated Labour candidate Patrick Leonard. In September 2015, he announced that he would not be seeking a second term and would stand down at the May 2016 PCC election.

He did not seek re-election in the 2016 PCC elections and was succeeded by Peter McCall.

== Controversy ==
In April 2013 the Cumberland and Westmorland Herald newspaper ran a story about Richard Rhodes's spending of £700 on a chauffeur for two evening engagements in the Lake District in January and February. Four days after publication, Cumbria police arrested a number of Cumbria police staff over the alleged 'leak'. In October 2013 the Crown Prosecution Service announced that no criminal proceedings would be taken against one of the 'whistleblowers', Mrs Irene Brown. (who was not allowed back in to her police staff role). He was forced to pay this money back when it appeared in the press, but was not prosecuted for theft and was allowed to remain in his position as commissioner despite misuse of public funds.
