= 2019 Woking Borough Council election =

2019 UK local government election

Map showing the results of the 2019 Woking Borough Council election

The 2019 Woking Borough Council election took place on 2 May 2019 to elect one third of members to Woking Borough Council in England coinciding with other local elections held across much of England. Elections in each ward are held in three years out of four. The previous election was held in 2018 and the next election was due to be held in 2020 but was instead deferred to 2021 along with all other ‘2020’ local elections due to the COVID-19 pandemic.

== Results summary ==
Shortly before these elections, in April 2019, Cllr. Graham Chrystie (a councillor for Pyrford ward) defected from the Conservatives to the Liberal Democrats, leaving the ruling Conservative administration going into these elections with exactly half - 15 out of 30 - of the seats on the council.

Although the Conservatives lost their overall majority on the council, following the election they continued to run the council as a minority administration. In the numerical analysis below (the Results Summary and the individual Results by Ward) the performance of each Party or candidate is compared against the results of the Woking Borough Council (WBC) elections of the previous year of 2018. However, in terms of individual wards ‘held’ or ‘gained’ in 2019 the comparison is with the winning second placed candidates/Parties in the all-out WBC elections of 2016, as these were the sitting councillors seeking re-election in 2019.

Woking Borough Council election, 2019
Party	This election				Full council			This election		
Party	Candidates	Seats	Net	Seats %	Other	Total	Total %	Votes	Votes %	+/−
Conservative	{{{candidates}}}	4	▼1	40.0	10	14	46.66	8,976	33.5	▼12.3
Liberal Democrats	{{{candidates}}}	4	▲1	40.0	6	10	33.33	8,011	29.9	▲0.7
Independent	{{{candidates}}}	1	Steady	10.0	2	3	10	3,611	13.5	▲7.3
Labour	{{{candidates}}}	1	Steady	10.0	2	3	10	2,633	9.8	▼6.3
UKIP	{{{candidates}}}	0		—	0	0	—	1,803	6.7	▲4.0
Green	{{{candidates}}}	0		—	0	0	—	1,798	6.7	New
Turnout							27,884		—	

== Ward results ==
=== Byfleet and West Byfleet ===
Byfleet and West Byfleet
Party	Candidate	Votes	%	±%
Independent	Amanda Jayne Boote	1,440	53.4	+12.5
Conservative	Irene Esther Watson Green	614	22.8	−16.3
Liberal Democrats	Ellen Sophie Nicholson	364	13.5	+1.3
UKIP	Jamie Paul Hayward	157	5.8	New
Green	James Duncan Craig	120	4.5	New
Majority		826	30.6	
Turnout		2,701	31.44	
Independent hold		Swing		

=== Canalside ===
Canalside
Party	Candidate	Votes	%	±%
Labour	Mohammad Ali	1,033	37.6	−7.4
Conservative	Mohammad Riasat Khan	827	30.1	−2.7
Liberal Democrats	Andrea Elizabeth Barker	375	13.6	+1.1
UKIP	William Nelson Owen Roe	315	11.5	+7.6
Green	Richard Guy Lewis Connelly	198	7.2	New
Majority		206	7.5	
Turnout		2,767	37.19	
Labour hold		Swing		

=== Goldsworth Park ===
Goldsworth Park
Party	Candidate	Votes	%	±%
Liberal Democrats	James Richard Sanderson	1,032	42.2	+4.6
Conservative	Jonathan Thomas Ewart Cope	755	30.9	−7.1
Labour	Christopher David Martin	280	11.4	−9.0
UKIP	Troy de Leon	234	9.6	+5.7
Green	Ella Jessica Walding	145	5.9	New
Majority		277	11.3	
Turnout		2,454	35.24	
Liberal Democrats hold		Swing		

=== Heathlands ===
Heathlands
Party	Candidate	Votes	%	±%
Conservative	Ayesha Azad	1,424	51.3	−10.9
Independent	Robert Arthur Shatwell	542	19.5	N/A
Liberal Democrats	Guy Tuson Cosnahan	538	19.4	−5.0
Green	Anna Katharine Wright	271	9.8	New
Majority		882	31.8	
Turnout		2,791	39.82	
Conservative hold		Swing		

=== Hoe Valley ===
Hoe Valley
Party	Candidate	Votes	%	±%
Liberal Democrats	Louise Mary Nell Morales	1,147	56.8	+7.7
Conservative	Colin Patrick Scott	374	18.5	−14.6
Labour	Brian Stanley Walter	204	10.1	−3.9
UKIP	David Simon Roe	159	7.9	+4.0
Green	Ivica Petrikova	137	6.8	New
Majority		773	38.3	
Turnout		2,039	28.56	
Liberal Democrats hold		Swing		

=== Horsell ===
Horsell
Party	Candidate	Votes	%	±%
Conservative	Colin Sidney Kemp	1,298	41.8	−8.2
Liberal Democrats	John Francis Doran	1,083	34.9	−0.5
Green	Nigel Charles Ridgeon	266	8.6	New
UKIP	Judith Diana Squire	260	8.4	+4.8
Labour	Joshua James Reid	196	6.3	−4.8
Majority		215	7.1	
Turnout		3,122	43.75	
Conservative hold		Swing		

=== Knaphill ===
Knaphill
Party	Candidate	Votes	%	±%
Conservative	Melanie Anne Whitehand	960	36.3	−17.6
Independent	Hassan Badrudrin Akberali	808	30.5	+14.9
Liberal Democrats	Norman Grenville Johns	339	12.8	−2.5
Labour	Geraldine Margaret Mitchell-Smith	214	8.1	−7.1
Green	Alexandra May Connelly	180	6.8	New
UKIP	Andrew George Glen	145	5.5	New
Majority		152	5.8	
Turnout		2,655	33.30	
Conservative hold		Swing		

=== Mount Hermon ===
Mount Hermon
Party	Candidate	Votes	%	±%
Liberal Democrats	Ian Johnson	1,421	51.0	+7.9
Conservative	John Frederick Lawrence	806	28.9	−13.6
Labour	Zara Coombes	211	7.6	−4.8
Green	Irene Jane Ridgeon	196	7.0	New
UKIP	Richard Peter Farr Squire	155	5.6	+0.3
Majority		615	22.1	
Turnout		2,802	37.80	
Liberal Democrats hold		Swing		

=== Pyrford ===
Pyrford
Party	Candidate	Votes	%	±%
Conservative	Gary William Elson	1,099	37.8	−21.5
Independent	Joanna Avey	821	28.2	N/A
Liberal Democrats	Ian Michael Lachowicz	419	14.4	−7.0
Labour	Samar Akhlaq Chaudhary	323	11.1	−3.3
Green	Danny Clarke	124	4.3	New
UKIP	Robin Deller Milner	124	4.3	−1.0
Majority		278	9.6	
Turnout		2,921	39.22	
Conservative hold		Swing		

=== St John's ===
St John's
Party	Candidate	Votes	%	±%
Liberal Democrats	Robert Norman Leach	1,293	47.9	+4.4
Conservative	Mark Russell John Pengelly	819	30.3	−11.2
UKIP	Timothy Martin Read	254	9.4	+5.1
Labour	John Scott-Morgan	172	6.4	−4.4
Green	Kathleen Elizabeth Kett	161	6.0	New
Majority		474	17.6	
Turnout		2,802	37.80	
Liberal Democrats gain from Conservative		Swing		
