= Mike Pannett =

Mike Pannett is a former police officer and author of eight books recounting his experiences as an officer with the North Yorkshire Police. He stood as an independent candidate for North Yorkshire Police and Crime Commissioner in the 2016 election.

== Early life ==
Pannett was born in York and attended the Joseph Rowntree School. However, he left with no qualifications, and got a job working as a parts salesman for Ford Motor Co. He then served in the Territorial Army as a NCO before taking the police admissions test at the age of 25.

== Police career ==
Pannett joined the Metropolitan Police in 1988, becoming one of the youngest officers to be given his own 'patch'. During his time with the Metropolitan Police, he served on the Divisional Crime Squad, Murder Squad and the Territorial Support Group.

In 1997, he transferred to the North Yorkshire Police, becoming a rural beat officer and later a wildlife officer. In 2005, he starred in the BBC television series Country Cops. Following this, he was inspired to write about his time with the North Yorkshire Police. He left North Yorkshire Police at the rank of Temporary Sergeant in 2007, having secured a publishing deal.

== Political career ==
Ahead of the 2010 general election, Pannett published a manifesto in The Yorkshire Post detailing what he believed should be the policing priorities for the political parties.

In December 2015, Pannett announced his plans to stand as an independent candidate for North Yorkshire Police and Crime Commissioner in the 2016 election. Announcing his candidacy, he said: "I cannot stand by and watch policing levels and capacity regressing back to the 1970's. We are all sick and tired of being spoon-fed government spin that crime is falling and all is well in frontline policing. This simply isn't what we are experiencing right in front of our eyes in our own communities." Pannett received 30,984 votes, placing him 3rd of the four candidates behind Conservatives and Labour.

== Personal life ==
Pannett lives in Crayke, is married to Ann, and has three children.

== Bibliography ==
- Now Then Lad.. (2008)
- You're Coming with Me Lad... (2009)
- Not On My Patch, Lad (2010)
- Just the Job, Lad (2011)
- Up Beat and Down Dale (2012)
- Mike Pannett's Yorkshire (2013) with co-author Alan Wilkinson
- A Likely Tale, Lad (2014)
- Crime Squad: Life and death on London's front line (2016) with co-author Kris Hollington
