= David Keane (politician) =

British politician

Cheshire Police and Crime Commissioner
- In office 12 May 2016 – 12 May 2021
- Preceded by: John Dwyer
- Succeeded by: John Dwyer

Personal details
- Party: Labour and Co-operative

David Keane is a British politician who served as the Cheshire Police and Crime Commissioner from 2016 to 2021 representing the Labour and Co-operative Party. He was elected to the post on 5 May 2016, succeeding the previous incumbent, John Dwyer. He was then defeated by Dwyer during the 6 May 2021 Police and Crime Commissioner Elections. He has served as a councillor on Warrington Borough Council since 2001.
