= Cheshire and Warrington Combined Authority =

Strategic authority and combined authority in England

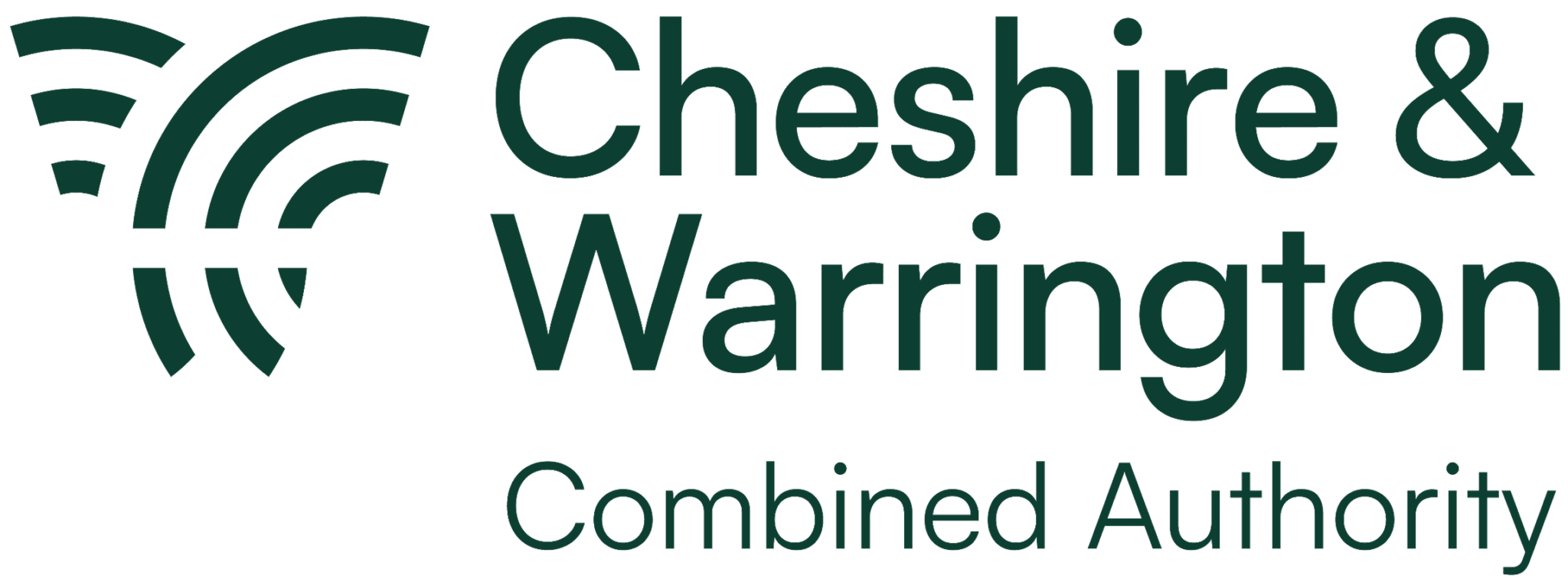
- Logo

- Map of the combined authority area

Type
- Type: Combined authority of Cheshire and Warrington

History
- Founded: 24 February 2026

Leadership
- Mayor of Cheshire and Warrington: TBD
- Chair: Louise Gittins, Labour since 22 April 2026

Structure
- Graph of the party split among 6 seats.

Elections
- Voting system: Directly elected mayor
- Next election: 2027

Meeting place
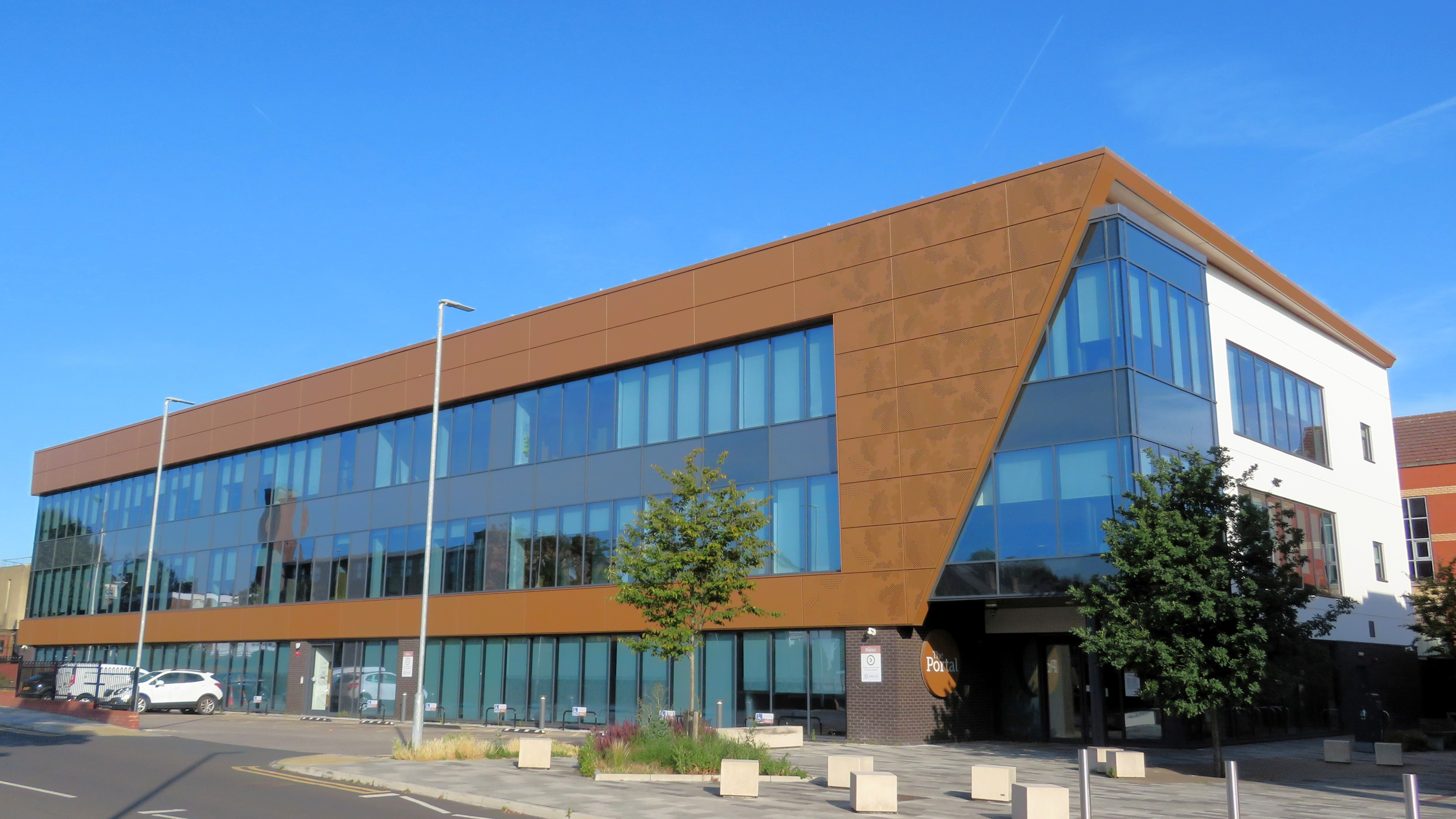
- The Portal, Wellington Road, Ellesmere Port

Website
- cheshireandwarrington-ca.gov.uk

The Cheshire and Warrington Combined Authority is a combined authority in the ceremonial county of Cheshire, England. It encompasses three of the four unitary authorities in the county, excluding Halton Borough Council which is in the Liverpool City Region.

The creation of the combined authority is linked to the English Devolution and Community Empowerment Act 2026, first outlined in 2024 by the Starmer ministry. It was established in February 2026.

The authority will be led by a directly-elected mayor of Cheshire and Warrington who will be a member of the Mayoral Council for England and the Council of the Nations and Regions. The first election will be held in 2027.

== History ==
The combined authority was established on 24 February 2026 by secondary legislation made on 23 February 2026.

== Constituent authorities ==
The combined authority is made up of:

- Cheshire East Council
- Cheshire West and Chester Council
- Warrington Borough Council

== Structure ==
The Combined Authority Board consists of the leaders and deputy leaders of the constituent authorities. The board members nominate a chair from amongst themselves until the first Mayor of Cheshire and Warrington is elected in 2027. At the board's first meeting on 22 April 2026, Labour councillor Louise Gittins, the leader of Cheshire West and Chester Council, was appointed as the chair of the board for the authority's first year.

Combined Authority Board

Name	Nominating authority
Nick Mannion	Cheshire East Council
Michael Gorman	Cheshire East Council
Louise Gittins	Cheshire West and Chester Council
Karen Shore	Cheshire West and Chester Council
Hans Mundry	Warrington Borough Council
Jean Flaherty	Warrington Borough Council

== See also ==
- Devolution in the United Kingdom § England
