= John Dwyer (police officer) =

British politician and law enforcement officer

Cheshire Police and Crime Commissioner
- In office 13 May 2021 – 8 May 2024
- Preceded by: David Keane
- Succeeded by: Dan Price
- In office 22 November 2012 – 11 May 2016
- Preceded by: Office created
- Succeeded by: David Keane

Personal details
- Party: Conservative

John Dwyer is a former police officer who served as the Conservative Party Cheshire Police and Crime Commissioner from 2021 to 2024, and previously from 2012 to 2016.

Dwyer was the first person to hold the post and was elected on 15 November 2012. He was defeated by the Labour Party candidate David Keane at the 2016 election. He successfully stood against Keane at the 2021 election, becoming the first PCC to serve on non-consecutive terms.

He retired from the police as Assistant Chief Constable of Cheshire Constabulary in March 2001.

Dwyer was previously a borough councillor and is based in Nantwich.

In February 2024, Dwyer faced calls to resign as PCC, following comments over schoolgirls "wearing very short skirts" during a discussion on violence against women; local Labour MP Mike Amesbury accused Dwyer of victim blaming, saying the remark set "the wrong example to the men and women who work for Cheshire Constabulary" and "undermines public confidence." Louise Gittins, the leader of Cheshire West and Chester Council, also condemned Dwyer's comments.
