= Dafydd Llywelyn (politician) =

Welsh police commissioner since 2016

Dyfed-Powys Police and Crime Commissioner
- Incumbent
- Assumed office 12 May 2016
- Preceded by: Christopher Salmon

Personal details
- Born: November 1976 (age 49)
- Citizenship: United Kingdom
- Party: Plaid Cymru

Dafydd Llywelyn (born November 1976) is a Welsh Plaid Cymru politician. Since May 2016, he has served as the Dyfed-Powys Police and Crime Commissioner.

== Career ==
=== Early career ===
Llywelyn started his working life as a procurement officer for SONY Manufacturing UK. In 2001, he joined Dyfed–Powys Police as a management information officer. He moved to the Criminal Investigation Department as an analyst in 2002, and was promoted to chief analyst in 2007. In September 2014, he was appointed a lecturer and teaching fellow in criminology at Aberystwyth University. This appointment came through the Coleg Cymraeg Cenedlaethol (the Welsh National College) which aims to increase courses taught in the Welsh-language at universities in Wales.

=== Political career ===
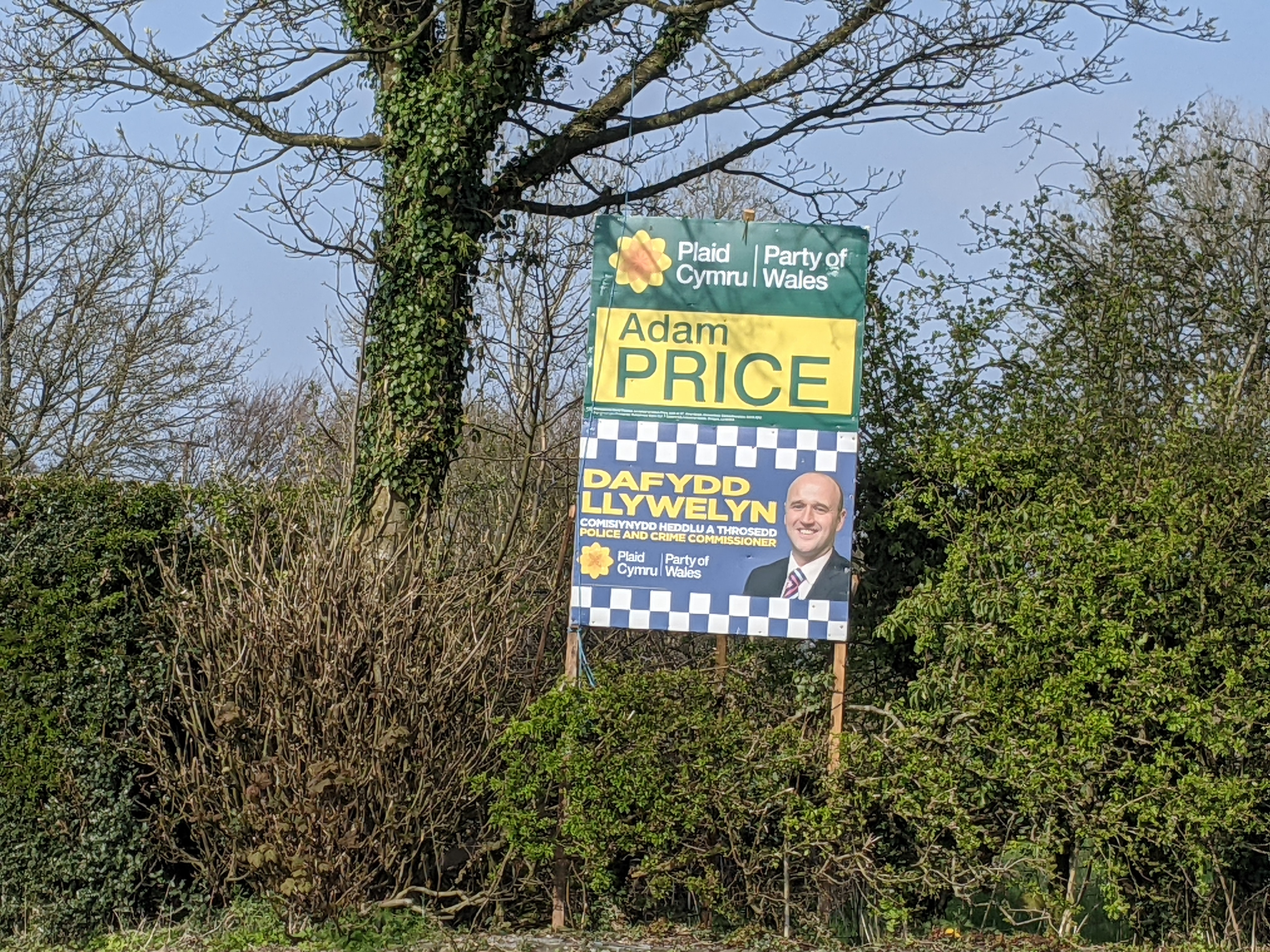
Dafydd Llywelyn placard in Saron, Llandysul, during the 2021 Elections.

In October 2015, it was announced that Llywelyn would be standing as the Plaid Cymru candidate for the Dyfed-Powys Police and Crime Commissioner (PCC) at the 2016 election. On 6 May 2016, he was elected PCC with a total of 75,158 votes (52,469 in the 1st round, plus 22,689 in the 2nd). In 2021, he was re-elected. In 2024 he was re-elected with a total of 31,323 votes.
