= Cumbria Police, Fire and Crime Commissioner =

- Incumbent; David Allen since 9 May 2024
- Police, fire and crime commissioner of Cumbria Police and Cumbria Fire and Rescue Service
- Reports to: Cumbria Police and Crime Panel
- Appointer: Electorate of Cumbria
- Term length: Four years
- Constituting instrument: Police Reform and Social Responsibility Act 2011
- Precursor: Cumbria Police Authority
- Inaugural holder: Richard Rhodes
- Formation: 22 November 2012
- Deputy: Deputy Police, Fire and Crime Commissioner
- Salary: £68,200
- Website: https://cumbria-pcc.gov.uk

The Cumbria Police, Fire and Crime Commissioner is the police, fire and crime commissioner, an elected official tasked with setting out the way crime is tackled by Cumbria Police in the English ceremonial county of Cumbria. The post was created in November 2012, as Cumbria Police and Crime Commissioner following an election held on 15 November 2012, and replaced the Cumbria Police Authority. Richard Rhodes was the first Cumbria Police and Crime Commissioner.

The current incumbent is David Allen, who was elected for the Labour and Co-operative Parties.

On 1 April 2023, the commissioner took on responsibility for Cumbria Fire and Rescue Service’s governance following the abolition of Cumbria County Council.

== List of commissioners ==
Name	Political party	From	To
Richard Rhodes	Conservative	22 November 2012	11 May 2016
Peter McCall	Conservative	12 May 2016	8 May 2024
David Allen	Labour Co-op	9 May 2024	Incumbent

== Elections ==
Cumbria Police, Fire and Crime Commissioner election, 2024
Party	Candidate	Votes	%	±%
Labour Co-op	David Allen	38,708		
Conservative	Mike Johnson	24,863		
Liberal Democrats	Adrian Waite	18,100		
