= Michael Lane (Royal Navy officer) =

English politician and Navy Commodore

Commodore Michael Lane

Hampshire Police and Crime Commissioner
- In office 12 May 2016 – 12 May 2021
- Chief Constable: Olivia Pinkney
- Preceded by: Simon Hayes
- Succeeded by: Donna Jones

Personal details
- Party: Conservative

Military service
- Allegiance: United Kingdom
- Branch/service: Royal Navy
- Years of service: 1972–2002
- Rank: Commodore
- Battles/wars: Falklands War; Gulf War; Cod War

Michael Lane is an English politician and former Royal Navy Commodore, and the former Police and Crime Commissioner for Hampshire, representing the Conservative Party. He was elected to the post on 5 May 2016, succeeding the previous incumbent, Simon Hayes. Lane served as a councillor with Gosport Borough Council from 2010 to 2014.
