= Dyfed-Powys Police and Crime Commissioner =

- Incumbent; Dafydd Llywelyn since 12 May 2016
- Police and crime commissioner of Dyfed-Powys Police
- Reports to: Dyfed-Powys Police and Crime Panel
- Appointer: Electorate of Dyfed and Powys
- Term length: Four years
- Constituting instrument: Police Reform and Social Responsibility Act 2011
- Precursor: Dyfed-Powys Police Authority
- Formation: 22 November 2012
- Deputy: Deputy Police and Crime Commissioner
- Salary: £68,200
- Website: www.dyfedpowys-pcc.org.uk/en/

The Dyfed-Powys Police and Crime Commissioner is the police and crime commissioner, an elected official tasked with setting out the way crime is tackled by Dyfed-Powys Police in the Welsh counties of Dyfed and Powys. The post was created in November 2012, following an election held on 15 November 2012, and replaced the Dyfed-Powys Police Authority. The current incumbent is Dafydd Llywelyn, who represents Plaid Cymru.

== List of Dyfed-Powys Police and Crime Commissioners ==
Name	Political party	From	To
Christopher Salmon	Conservative	22 November 2012	11 May 2016
Dafydd Llywelyn	Plaid Cymru	12 May 2016	Incumbent
