= 2018 Woking Borough Council election =

2018 UK local government election

← 2016	3 May 2018	2019 →

10 of the 30 seats on Woking Borough Council 16 seats needed for a majority
	First party	Second party	Third party
Party	Conservative	Liberal Democrats	Labour
Seats won	16	8	3
Seat change	▼1	▲1	Steady
Popular vote	12,770	8,131	4,500
Percentage	45.8%	29.2%	16.1%
Swing	▼1.7%	▲1.0%	▲5.8%
	Fourth party	Fifth party
Party	Independent	UKIP
Seats won	3	0
Seat change	Steady	Steady
Popular vote	1,731	752
Percentage	6.2%	2.7%
Swing	▲0.8%	▼2.7%
- Map of Woking electoral results

The 2018 Woking Borough Council election took place on 3 May 2018 to elect one third of members to Woking Borough Council in England coinciding with other local elections held across much of England. Elections in each ward are held in three years out of four.

Woking was one of the boroughs subject to a trial of voter ID requiring the production of photographic ID or 2 other forms of ID at the polling station.

== Results summary ==
The Conservatives lost one seat to the Liberal Democrats, with Mount Hermon councillor Mark Pengelly losing by a margin of just 17 votes to Liam Lyons, who had been defeated by Pengelly two years earlier. The Conservatives also failed to win their target seats of Byfleet and St John's by narrow margins, and came within 10 votes of losing in Goldsworth Park, although they held their seats in Horsell, Knaphill, Heathlands and Pyrford with very large majorities.

The result meant that the Tory majority over all other parties on the council reduced from four to two, so the Conservatives still maintained overall control as they have done since 2007, counting a short period of minority administration. Despite polling 3.2% in the all-out council elections in 2016, the Green Party did not field candidates.

Woking Borough Council election, 2018
Party	This election			Full council			This election		
Party	Seats	Net	Seats %	Other	Total	Total %	Votes	Votes %	+/−
Conservative	5	▼1	50.0	11	16	53.33	12,770	45.8	▼1.7
Liberal Democrats	3	▲1	30.0	5	8	26.66	8,131	29.2	▲1.0
Labour	1	Steady	10.0	2	3	10	4,500	16.1	▲5.8
Independent	1	Steady	10.0	2	3	10	1,731	6.2	▲0.8
UKIP	0		—	0	0	—	752	2.7	▼2.7
Turnout							27,884		—
Conservative hold									

== Ward by ward ==
Successful incumbents are marked with a green tick:, defeated incumbents with a red cross:

Byfleet and West Byfleet
Party	Candidate	Votes	%	±%
Independent	Mary Ann Bridgeman	1,178	40.9	
Conservative	Gary William Elson	1125	39.1	
Liberal Democrats	Ellen Sophie Nicholson	352	12.2	
Labour	Mohammed Sakhawat Khan	225	7.8	
Majority		53	1.8	
Turnout		2,880		
Independent hold		Swing		

Canalside
Party	Candidate	Votes	%	±%
Labour	Mohammed Ilyas Raja	1,213	45.0	
Conservative	Robina Shaheen	883	32.8	
Liberal Democrats	John Francis Doran	338	12.5	
Independent	David Benjamin Severn	155	5.8	
UKIP	Terence J Knight	105	3.9	
Majority		330	12.2	
Turnout		2,694		
Labour hold		Swing		

Goldsworth Park
Party	Candidate	Votes	%	±%
Conservative	Chitra Rana	930	38.0	
Liberal Democrats	James Richard Sanderson	920	37.6	
Labour	Christopher David Martin	500	20.4	
UKIP	Troy de Leon	95	3.9	
Majority		10	0.4	
Turnout		2,445		
Conservative hold		Swing		

Heathlands
Party	Candidate	Votes	%	±%
Conservative	Simon Michael Ashall	1,772	62.2	
Liberal Democrats	Thomas Edward Rimmer	695	24.4	
Labour	Elizabeth Anne Evans	383	13.4	
Majority		1,077	37.8	
Turnout		2,850		
Conservative hold		Swing		

Hoe Valley
Party	Candidate	Votes	%	±%
Liberal Democrats	Deborah Elizabeth Hughes	1,096	49.1	
Conservative	John Frederick Lawrence	739	33.1	
Labour	Geraldine Margaret Mitchell-Smith	312	14.0	
UKIP	Judith Diana Squire	86	3.9	
Majority		357	16.0	
Turnout		2,233		
Liberal Democrats hold		Swing		

Horsell
Party	Candidate	Votes	%	±%
Conservative	Nancy Hazel Mary Martin	1,612	50.0	
Liberal Democrats	Anthony Laurence Kremer	1141	35.4	
Labour	Conor Michael John Bakhuizen	357	11.1	
UKIP	Lynda Mary Sage	117	3.6	
Majority		471	14.6	
Turnout		3,227		
Conservative hold		Swing		

Knaphill
Party	Candidate	Votes	%	±%
Conservative	Deborah Harlow	1,376	53.9	
Independent	Hassan Badrudin Akberali	398	15.6	
Liberal Democrats	Jamie Diane Roscoe-Jones	391	15.3	
Labour	Colin Robert Bright	387	15.2	
Majority		978	38.3	
Turnout		2,552		
Conservative hold		Swing		

Mount Hermon
Party	Candidate	Votes	%	±%
Liberal Democrats	Liam Stuart Lyons	1,300	43.1	
Conservative	Mark Russell John Pengelly	1283	42.5	
Labour	Sabir Hussain	374	12.4	
UKIP	Richard Peter Farr Squire	62	2.1	
Majority		17	0.6	
Turnout		3,019		
Liberal Democrats gain from Conservative		Swing		

Pyrford
Party	Candidate	Votes	%	±%
Conservative	Rashid Mohammed	2,076	59.3	
Liberal Democrats	Ian Michael Lachowicz	679	21.4	
Labour	Geoffrey Folk O'Shea	447	14.4	
UKIP	Robin Deller Milner	167	5.3	
Majority		1,208	37.9	
Turnout		3,180		
Conservative hold		Swing		

St Johns
Party	Candidate	Votes	%	±%
Liberal Democrats	Kenneth Howard	1,219	43.5	
Conservative	Steven James Royston Dorsett	1163	41.5	
Labour	John Scott-Morgan	302	10.8	
UKIP	Timothy Martin Read	120	4.3	
Majority		56	2.0	
Turnout		2,804		
Liberal Democrats hold		Swing		
