= Hampshire and Isle of Wight Police and Crime Commissioner =

Elected official in England

- Incumbent; Donna Jones since 13 May 2021
- Police and crime commissioner of Hampshire and Isle of Wight Constabulary
- Reports to: Hampshire Police and Crime Panel
- Appointer: Electorate of Hampshire and the Isle of Wight
- Term length: Four years
- Constituting instrument: Police Reform and Social Responsibility Act 2011
- Precursor: Hampshire Police Authority
- Inaugural holder: Simon Hayes
- Formation: 22 November 2012
- Deputy: Deputy Police and Crime Commissioner
- Salary: £88,600
- Website: www.hampshire-pcc.gov.uk

The Hampshire and Isle of Wight Police and Crime Commissioner, previously Hampshire Police and Crime Commissioner, is the police and crime commissioner, an elected official tasked with setting out the way crime is tackled by Hampshire and Isle of Wight Constabulary in the English counties of Hampshire and the Isle of Wight. The post was created in November 2012, following an election held on 15 November 2012, and replaced the Hampshire Police Authority. The incumbent is Donna Jones, who represents the Conservative Party.

In November 2022, the force and PCC were renamed Hampshire and Isle of Wight.

== List of Hampshire police and crime commissioners ==
| Name | Political party | Dates in office |
|---|---|---|
| Simon Hayes | Independent | 22 November 2012 to 11 May 2016 |
| Michael Lane | Conservative | 12 May 2016 to 12 May 2021 |
| Donna Jones | Conservative | 13 May 2021 to Present |

== Elections ==
=== 2021 election ===
2021 Hampshire police and crime commissioner election
| Party | Candidate | 1st round | | 2nd round | | | 1st round votesTransfer votes, 2nd round |
| Party | Candidate | Total | Of round | Transfers | Total | Of round | 1st round votesTransfer votes, 2nd round |
|---|---|---|---|---|---|---|---|
| Conservative | Donna Jones | 262,667 | 49.84% | 50,326 | 312,993 | 68.23% | |
| Labour Co-op | Tony Bunday | 101,832 | 19.32% | 43,919 | 145,751 | 31.77% | |
| Liberal Democrats | Richard Murphy | 93,581 | 17.76% | | | | |
| Hampshire Independents | Steve James-Bailey | 68,895 | 13.07% | | | | |
| Turnout | | 526,975 | 36.19% | | | | |
| Conservative hold | | | | | | | |

Donna Jones won every counting area in Hampshire, with the closest being the traditionally Labour City of Southampton, where she won by 877 votes.
