= David Allen (police commissioner) =

English policeman

Cumbria Police, Fire and Crime Commissioner
- Incumbent
- Assumed office 9 May 2024
- Preceded by: Peter McCall

Personal details
- Party: Labour

David Allen is an English politician, the current Police, Fire, and Crime Commissioner for Cumbria, representing the Labour Party. He was elected to the post on 3 May 2024, succeeding the previous incumbent, Peter McCall.

Allen served as a police officer in the Cumbria Constabulary from 1986 to 2000, thereafter in the National Criminal Intelligence Service and later led the UK's Bureau at Europol before his retirement in 2016.
