= Christopher Salmon =

Welsh politician

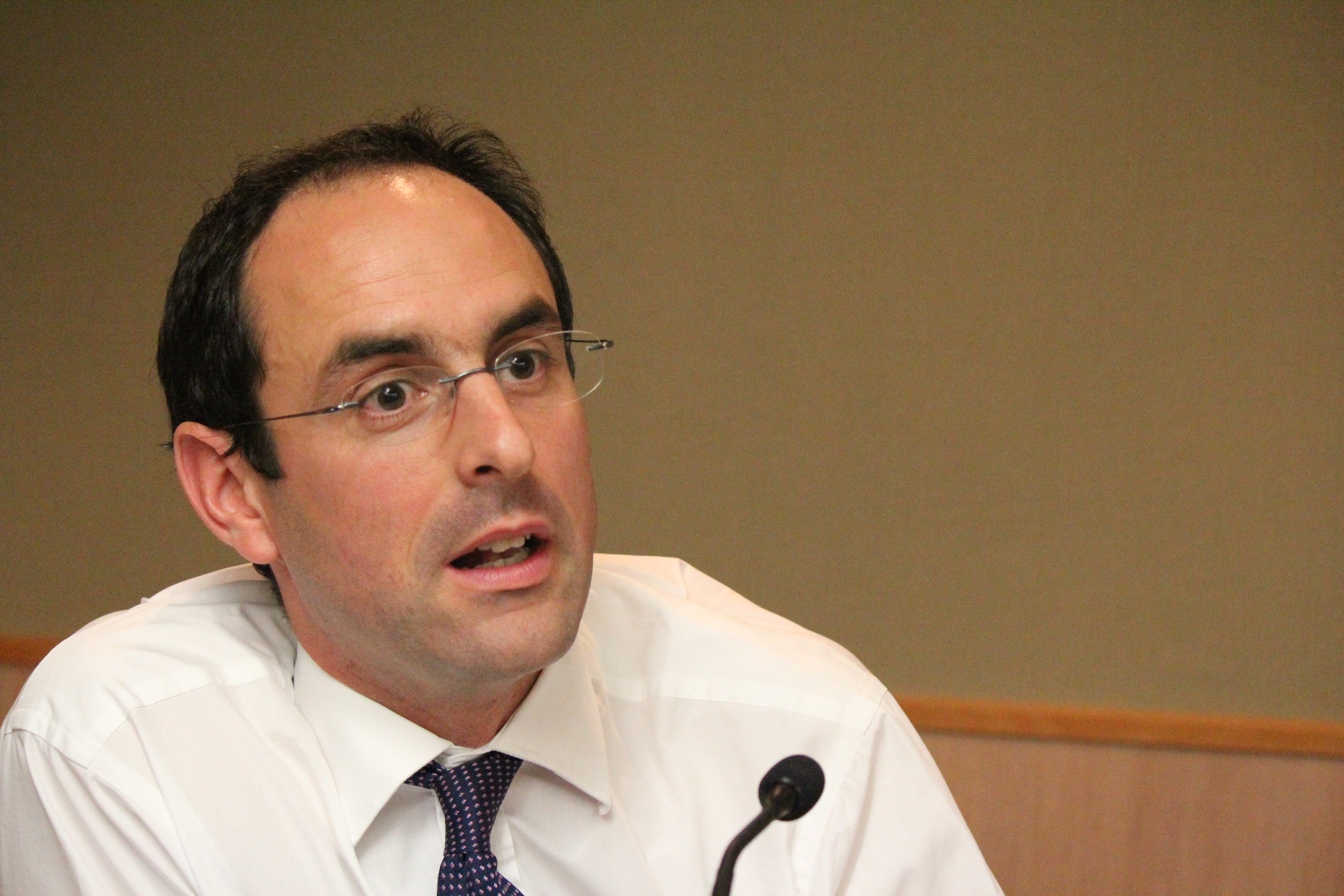
- Salmon in 2013

Dyfed-Powys Police and Crime Commissioner
- In office 22 November 2012 – 11 May 2016
- Preceded by: Post established
- Succeeded by: Dafydd Llywelyn

Personal details
- Born: 5 June 1978 (age 47) Presteigne, Powys, Wales
- Party: Conservative

Christopher Salmon (born 5 June 1978) is a Conservative politician, who served as Dyfed-Powys Police and Crime Commissioner, the largest police area in England and Wales, from November 2012 until May 2016. He was the first person to hold the post and was elected on 15 November 2012.

He stood for re-election to the post of Dyfed-Powys Police Commissioner at the elections held on Thursday 5 May 2016. However, he was defeated by Dafydd Llywelyn of Plaid Cymru. Since then he has lived and worked in London, most recently for Michael Gove.

== Early life and career ==
Salmon, one of four siblings, was born in Presteigne, Wales. He was educated at Winchester College; Pembroke College, Oxford University; and Royal Military Academy, Sandhurst, where he graduated as an Army Officer and served in Northern Ireland, Kosovo and Iraq.

He joined the British Army in 2003, becoming a press officer of The Rifles during his tour of Iraq. He left as a captain. After the army, he matriculated to UCL and decided to read Russian.

== Politics ==
In 2010, Salmon stood as a Conservative candidate in the Llanelli constituency, receiving 5,381 votes (14.4%), the highest number of votes for the Conservatives in Llanelli since 1992, and the highest percentage of Conservative votes since 1997.

== Miscellaneous ==
Salmon is a regular contributor to The Times.

He currently lives near Guildford.
