= Cheshire Police and Crime Commissioner =

- Incumbent; Dan Price since 9 May 2024
- Police and crime commissioner of Cheshire Police
- Reports to: Cheshire Police and Crime Panel
- Appointer: Electorate of Cheshire
- Term length: Four years
- Constituting instrument: Police Reform and Social Responsibility Act 2011
- Precursor: Cheshire Police Authority
- Inaugural holder: John Dwyer
- Formation: 22 November 2012
- Salary: £78,400 (2024)
- Website: www.cheshire-pcc.gov.uk

The Cheshire Police and Crime Commissioner is the police and crime commissioner, an elected official tasked with setting out the way crime is tackled by Cheshire Police in the English County of Cheshire. The post was created in November 2012, following an election held on 15 November 2012, and replaced the Cheshire Police Authority. The current incumbent is Dan Price, who represents the Labour Party.

== List of Cheshire Police and Crime Commissioners ==
Name	Political party	From	To
John Dwyer	Conservative	22 November 2012	11 May 2016
David Keane	Labour	12 May 2016	12 May 2021
John Dwyer	Conservative	13 May 2021	8 May 2024
Dan Price	Labour	9 May 2024	Incumbent
