= Simon Hayes (police commissioner) =

British politician and police commissioner

Hampshire Police and Crime Commissioner
- In office 22 November 2012 – 11 May 2016
- Succeeded by: Michael Lane

Personal details
- Born: November 1958 (age 67)
- Party: Independent

Simon Alexander Hayes (born November 1958) is a British politician. He served as the Hampshire Police and Crime Commissioner for Hampshire Constabulary from 2012 to 2016. He was the first person to hold the post and was elected on 15 November 2012 as an Independent. He received 47,632 first preference votes from an electorate of nearly 1.5 million on a turnout of 14.6% at the PCC Election in 2012. Hayes was one of the minority Independent PCCs country and as such has no party-political affiliations.

Hayes was the chairman of Hampshire and Isle of Wight Crimestoppers and is a former chairman of the Hampshire Police Authority.

In Hayes' previous role as Chairman of the Police Authority he was also a Conservative councillor on both Hampshire County Council and New Forest District Council. He was also the Conservative candidate for Mid Dorset and North Poole in 2005.

Hayes faced accusations that he lives in Earls Barton, Northamptonshire, However, the IPCC was satisfied that he lived in Hampshire.
