= Dan Price (police commissioner) =

British politician, police commissioner and engineer

Cheshire Police and Crime Commissioner
- Incumbent
- Assumed office 9 May 2024
- Preceded by: John Dwyer

Member of Warrington Borough Council for Great Sankey North & Whittle Hall
- In office 2016–2021
- Succeeded by: Hitesh Patel

Member of Warrington Borough Council for Great Sankey North
- In office 2011–2016

Personal details
- Party: Labour (??-2018, 2021-Present)
- Other political affiliations: Change UK (2018-2021)

Daniel Price is a British politician and engineer who has served as Cheshire Police and Crime Commissioner since May 2024.

== Early life and education ==
Price studied at St Gregory's Catholic High School followed by an apprenticeship with Unilever.

== Career ==
Price was previously an engineer. He was elected to Warrington Borough Council in 2011 representing the Ward Great Sankey North (the Ward was later reformed into Great Sankey North & Whittle Hall in 2016), becoming Warrington's youngest ever councillor at the age of 21. Price resigned from the Labour Party in April 2019, but in December said that he would tactically vote for the party in the 2019 general election. He would serve as an Independent Councillor before stepping down for the 2021 local elections. He was a Change UK candidate in the 2019 European Parliament election for North West England.

Price was the vice chair of Great Sankey Parish Council and never stood for re-election due to the police and crime commissioner candidacy.

Price was the Labour Party candidate in the 2024 England and Wales police and crime commissioner elections for Cheshire constabulary. He defeated the incumbent John Dwyer, receiving 86,279 votes.

== Personal life ==
Price has lived in Cheshire all his life. Price is openly gay and is married to his husband Alessandro. The couple have two dogs.
