= Cumbria Constabulary =

English territorial police force

- Motto: Safer, stronger Cumbria

Agency overview
- Formed: 1974; 52 years ago
- Preceding agencies: Cumberland and Westmorland Constabulary; Kendal Borough Police; Carlisle City Police
- Employees: 2,151
- Volunteers: 142
- Annual budget: £177 million

Jurisdictional structure
- Operations jurisdiction: Cumberland; Westmorland and Furness, England
- Map of police area
- Area: 2,634 square miles (6,820 km^{2})
- Population: 500,000
- Legal jurisdiction: England and Wales
- Governing body: Home Office
- Constituting instrument: Police Act 1996
- General nature: Local civilian police

Operational structure
- Overseen by: His Majesty's Inspectorate of Constabulary and Fire & Rescue Services; Independent Office for Police Conduct
- Headquarters: Carleton Hall, Penrith
- Constables: 1,121
- Police community support officers: 99
- Police and crime commissioner responsible: David Allen, Labour Party
- Agency executive: Darren Martland, Chief constable
- Territorial police areas: Cumberland; Westmorland & Furness

Facilities
- Stations: 14

Website
- www.cumbria.police.uk

Cumbria Constabulary is the territorial police force in England covering the ceremonial county of Cumbria. As of September 2017, the force had 1,108 police officers, 535 police staff, 93 police community support officers, and 86 special constables.

The force serves a population of 500,000 across an area of 2,634 square miles (6,820 km^{2}). There are significant areas of isolated and rural community, and the area has one of the smallest visible minority ethnic populations in the country at under 3.0%. Each year, the force's area, which incorporates the Lake District National Park, attracts over 23 million visitors from all over the world (46 times the local population). The area has 67 miles (108 km) of motorway and some 700 miles (1,100 km) of trunk and primary roads.

The chief constable is Darren Martland. The headquarters of the force are at Carleton Hall, Penrith.

== History ==
Cumberland and Westmorland Constabulary was formed in 1856. In 1947 this force absorbed Kendal Borough Police. Less than 20 years later this amalgamated force absorbed Carlisle City Police to form a force broadly the same as today's force called the Cumberland, Westmorland and Carlisle Constabulary. In 1965, it had an establishment of 652 and an actual strength of 617. In 1967 the force name was changed to Cumbria Constabulary.

In 1974 the force's boundaries were expanded to include the new non-metropolitan county of Cumbria, in particular Furness and Sedbergh Rural District.

The Home Secretary proposed on 6 February 2006 to merge it with Lancashire Constabulary. These proposals were accepted by both forces on 25 February and the merger would have taken place on 1 April 2007. However, in July 2006, the Cumbria and Lancashire forces decided not to proceed with the merger because the Government could not remedy issues with the differing council tax precepts.

=== Chief constables ===
Cumbria Constabulary (1967)

- 1968–1980: William Cavey
- 1980–1987: Barry David Keith Price
- 1988–1991: Sir Leslie Sharp
- 1991–1997: Alan Elliott
- 1997–2001: Colin Phillips
- 2001–2007: Michael Baxter
- 2007–2012: Craig Thomas Mackey
- 2012–2013: Stuart Hyde
- 2014–2018: Jerry Graham
- 2018–2023: Michelle Skeer
- 2023–2025: Rob Carden
- 2025–Present: Darren Martland

=== Officers killed in the line of duty ===
The Police Roll of Honour Trust and Police Memorial Trust list and commemorate all British police officers killed in the line of duty. Since its establishment in 1984, the Police Memorial Trust has erected 50 memorials nationally to some of those officers.

- On 3 July 1915, Reserve Police Constable Andrew Johnstone was on duty near Carlisle railway station when he reported to his sergeant that he was feeling ill. He was told to make his way home, but he never arrived and was found drowned in a dammed river in Denton Holme.
- The force's first, and to date only, murder of an officer occurred on 10 February 1965. Constable George William Russell, aged 36, was fatally shot when, unarmed and knowing that colleagues had already been fired on, he confronted an armed suspect and called upon him to surrender at the railway station in Kendal. Russell was posthumously awarded the Queen's Police Medal for gallantry and a memorial plaque has been unveiled on a wall at Carlisle Cathedral.
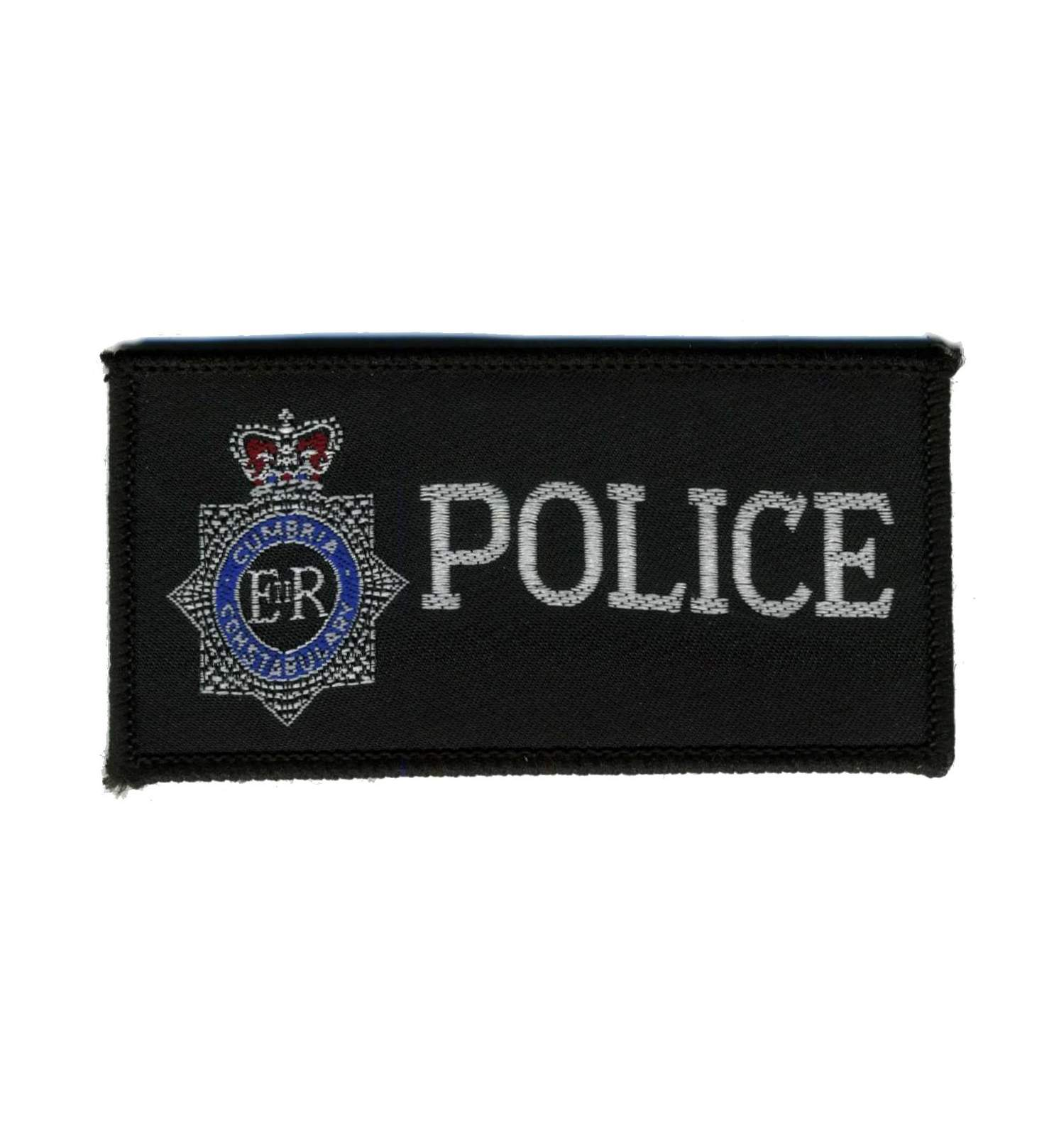
- Cumbria Constabulary Patch
  PC Nick Dumphreys was killed on duty on 26 January 2020, when his car crashed whilst responding to an emergency call in the Carlisle area. PC Dumphreys was part of Cumbria Constabulary's roads policing unit. In September 2022, the cause of the crash was determined to be an inherent problem with BMW engines – an oil leak at high speed spilling onto the wheels and causing him to lose control at 130 mph (210 km/h).

== Organisation ==
In terms of operational policing, the force is divided into two commands – the Territorial Policing Command and the Crime Command, each headed by a Chief Superintendent.

=== Territorial Policing Command ===
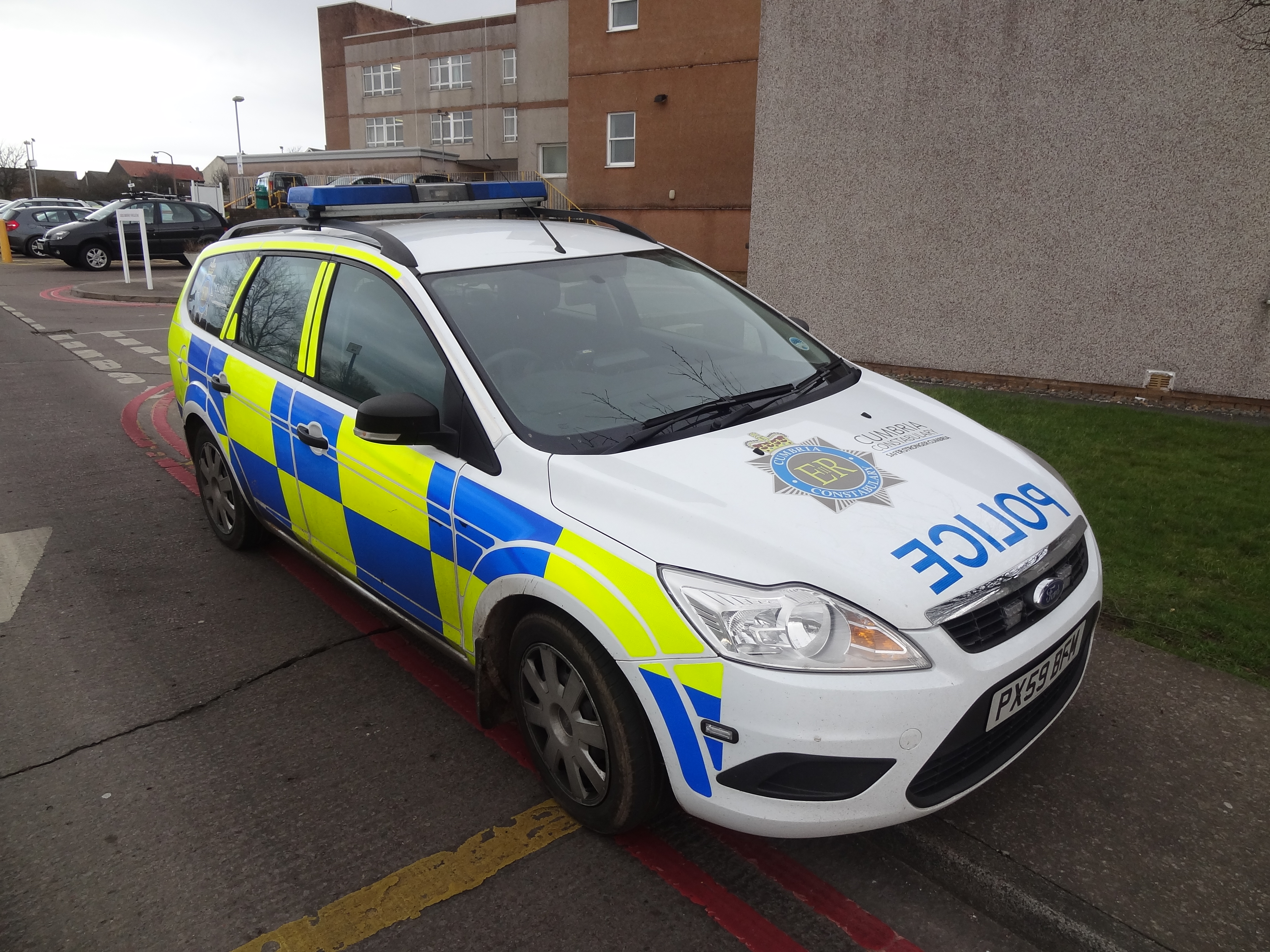
Cumbria Constabulary Area Car

This command is further divided into three geographic Territorial Policing Areas (TPAs) to cover the county, an operational support section and a command and control section. Each TPA is led by a Superintendent and is further divided into districts and then teams for the purposes of neighbourhood policing. The major elements of the Territorial Policing Command are as follows:

==== North Territorial Policing Area ====
Responsible for neighbourhood and response policing across the following geographic areas:

- Carlisle District

==== South Territorial Policing Area ====
Responsible for neighbourhood and response policing across the following geographic areas:

- Barrow Borough District
- South Lakeland District
- Eden District

==== West Territorial Policing Area ====
Responsible for neighbourhood and response policing across the following geographic areas

- Allerdale District
- Copeland District

==== Operational Support ====
Within this section are force wide units which support the TPAs or units from the Crime Command, or provide a specialist service:

- Roads Policing
- Firearms
- Dog section
- Proactive Support Group
- Civil Contingencies
- Collision Investigation
- Firearms Licensing
- Safety Camera/Central Ticket Office

==== Command and Control ====
Within this section is the Command and Control Room (dispatch), including the Force Incident Manager (FIM) and the call taking centre.

=== Crime Command ===
This command is responsible for significant investigations and is predominantly staffed by detectives. The command is divided as follows:

- Intelligence
  - Force Intelligence Bureau
  - Intelligence Analysis
  - Area Intelligence Units
- Operations
  - Public Protection Units
  - CID Volume Crimes
  - Force Major Investigations
  - Safeguarding Hub
- Forensics

== Collaborations ==
Cumbria Constabulary is a partner in the following collaboration:

- North West Police Underwater Search & Marine Unit

== PEEL inspection 2022 ==
His Majesty's Inspectorate of Constabulary and Fire & Rescue Services (HMICFRS) conducts a periodic police effectiveness, efficiency and legitimacy (PEEL) inspection of each police service's performance. In its latest PEEL inspection, Cumbria Constabulary was rated as follows:

	Outstanding	Good	Adequate	Requires Improvement	Inadequate
2021/22 rating	Managing offenders	Investigating crime; Developing a positive workplace; Protecting vulnerable people	Preventing crime; Treatment of the public; Responding to the public; Good use of resources		

== See also ==
- Cumbria Police, Fire and Crime Commissioner
- Law enforcement in the United Kingdom
- List of law enforcement agencies in the United Kingdom, Crown Dependencies and British Overseas Territories
- PC John Kent – The first black British police officer, who served with the then Carlisle City Police between 1837 and 1844
