= Bacton and Old Newton Ward =

Former electoral ward in Suffolk, England

Bacton and Old Newton Ward is a former electoral ward in Mid-Suffolk, Suffolk, England. The ward was created by the District of Mid Suffolk (Electoral Changes) Order 2001, in which it was defined as consisting of the parishes of Bacton, Gipping and Old Newton with Dagworth. The ward was abolished in 2019.

The candidate information for the Bacton and Old Newton Ward.

== Councillors ==
Election	Member	Party
2003	Michael Shave	Independent
2007	Sarah Stringer	Independent
2011	Sarah Stringer	Independent
2015	Jill Wilshaw	Conservative

=== 2011 Results ===
The election was held on

Candidate name:	Party:	Votes:	% of votes:
Stringer, Sarah	Independent	476	48.92
Bennett, Simon	Conservative	281	42.34
Hawkins, Ian	UK Independence Party	128	8.74

=== 2015 Results ===
The turnout of the election was 70.34%.

Candidate name:	Party name:	Votes:	% of votes:
Jill Wilshaw	Conservative	687	50.63
Jacob Stringer	Independent	670	49.37

== See also ==
- Mid Suffolk local elections
