= Palgrave Ward =

Electoral ward of Mid Suffolk, England

The candidate information for the Palgrave Ward in Mid-Suffolk, Suffolk, England.

== Councillors ==
Election	Member	Party
2011	David Burn	Conservative
2015	David Burn	Conservative
2019	David Burn	Conservative
2023	Tim Weller	Green

== 2011 Results ==
Candidate name:	Party name:	Votes:	% of votes:
Burn, David	Conservative	534	58.68
Guthrie, Brian	Green	209	22.97
Halton, Elaine	Labour	167	18.35

== 2015 Results ==
The turnout of the election was 74.36%.

Candidate name:	Party name:	Votes:	% of votes:
David BURN	Conservative	870	65.07
Sarah GUTHRIE	Green	241	18.03
Elaine HALTON	Labour	226	16.90

== 2019 Results ==
The turnout of the election was 36.9%.

Candidate name:	Party name:	Votes:	% of votes:
David BURN	Conservative	465	58.1
Gillian HERIZ-SMITH	Green	335	41.9

== 2023 Results ==
The turnout of the election was 43.8%.

Candidate name:	Party name:	Votes:	% of votes:
Tim WELLER	Green	536	51.9
Tim PASSMORE	Conservative	444	43.0
Evan HEASLEY	Reform UK	53	5.1

== See also ==
- Mid Suffolk local elections
