= Debenham Ward =

Electoral ward of Mid Suffolk, England

The candidate information for the Debenham Ward in Mid-Suffolk, Suffolk, England.

== Councillors ==
Election	Member	Party
2011	Kathie Guthrie	Conservative
2015	Kathie Guthrie	Conservative

== 2011 Results ==
Candidate name:	Party name:	Votes:	% of votes:
Guthrie, Kathie	Conservative	509	53.30
Fearnley, Brian	Green	178	18.64
Chattington, Jennifer	Labour	176	18.43
Stanfield, Xy	Liberal Democrat	92	9.63

== 2015 Results ==
The turnout of the election was 71.54%.

Candidate name:	Party name:	Votes:	% of votes: 1348
Kathie GUTHRIE	Conservative	679	50.37
Bec JASPER	Labour	293	21.74
Roger FOURACRE	UKIP	157	11.65
Mark FINBOW	Green	151	11.20
David PAYNE	Liberal Democrat	68	5.04

== See also ==
- Mid Suffolk local elections
