= Haughley and Wetherden Ward =

Electoral ward in Mid Suffolk, England

The candidate information for the Haughley and Wetherden Ward in Mid-Suffolk, Suffolk, England.

== Councillors ==
Election	Member	Party
2011	Rachel Eburne	Green
2015	Rachel Eburne	Green

== 2011 Results ==
Candidate name:	Party:	Votes:	% of votes:
Eburne, Rachel	Green	Not contested	

== 2015 Results ==
Candidate name:	Party:	Votes:	% of votes:
Eburne, Rachel	Green	Not contested	

== See also ==
- Mid Suffolk local elections
