= The Stonhams Ward =

Electoral ward of Mid Suffolk, England

The candidate information for The Stonhams Ward in Mid-Suffolk, Suffolk, England.

== Councillors ==
Election	Member	Party
2011	Terence Anthony Curran	Conservative
2015	Susan Morley	Conservative

== 2011 results ==
Candidate name:	Party name:	Votes:	% of votes:
Curran, Terence Anthony	Conservative	462	46.20
Fowler, Anthony Colin	Liberal Democrat	295	29.50
Hardingham, Nicholas Robert	Green	152	15.20
Hicks, Jan	Labour	91	9.10

== 2015 Results ==
The turnout of the election was 78.49%.

Candidate name:	Party name:	Votes:	% of votes: 1423
Susan MORLEY	Conservative	834	58.61
Nicholas HARDINGHAM	Green	425	29.87
Kay FIELD	Liberal Democrats	164	11.52

== See also ==
- Mid Suffolk local elections
