= Worlingworth Ward =

Electoral division in Suffolk, England

The candidate information for the Worlingworth Ward in Mid-Suffolk, Suffolk, England.

== Councillors ==
Election	Member	Party
2011	Matthew Hicks	Conservative
2015	Matthew Hicks	Conservative

== 2011 Results ==
Candidate name:	Party name:	Votes:	% of votes:
Hicks, Matthew	Conservative	613	63.07
Burrows, Paul	Labour	221	22.74
Aalders-Dunthorne, Kielen	Liberal Democrat	138	14.20

== 2015 Results ==
Candidate name:	Party name:	Votes:	% of votes:
Hicks, Matthew	Conservative	Not contested	

== See also ==
- Mid Suffolk local elections
