= Bramford and Blakenham Ward =

Electoral ward of Mid Suffolk, England

The candidate information for the Bramford and Blakenham Ward in Mid-Suffolk, Suffolk, England. This pages shows the results of the latest election on Thursday 5 May 2011. This ward elects two councillors.

== Councillors ==
| Election | Member | Party | Member | Party |
|---|---|---|---|---|
| 2011 | Michael Blakenham | Suffolk Together | John Field | Liberal Democrats |
| 2015 | Kevin Welsby | Conservative | John Field | Liberal Democrats |

== 2011 Results ==
| Candidate name: | Party: | Votes: | % of votes: |
|---|---|---|---|
| Blakenham, Michael | Suffolk Together | 731 | 30.26 |
| Field, John | Liberal Democrats | 584 | 24.17 |
| Welsby, Kevin | Conservative | 453 | 18.75 |
| Smith, Brian | Liberal Democrats | 226 | 9.35 |
| Elliott, Tony | Labour | 222 | 9.19 |
| Meudec, Sophie | Labour | 200 | 8.28 |

== 2015 Results ==
The turnout of the election was 71.64%.

| Candidate name: | Party name: | Votes: | % of votes: |
|---|---|---|---|
| John FIELD | Liberal Democrats | 885 | 24.31 |
| Kevin WELSBY | Conservative Party | 829 | 22.77 |
| Aprille MEAKIN | Conservative Party | 697 | 19.15 |
| Linda SCOTT | Suffolk Together | 668 | 18.35 |
| Neil HARRISON | UKIP | 561 | 15.41 |

== See also ==
- Mid Suffolk local elections
