= Stowupland Ward =

Electoral ward in Mid Suffolk, England

The candidate information for the Stowupland Ward in Mid-Suffolk, Suffolk, England.

== Councillors ==
| Election | Member | Party |
|---|---|---|
| 2011 | Caroline Byles | Conservative |
| 2015 | Keith Welham | Green |

== 2011 Results ==
| Candidate name: | Party: | Votes: | % of votes: |
|---|---|---|---|
| Byles, Caroline | Conservative | 356 | 40.64 |
| Valladares, Mark | Liberal Democrat | 265 | 30.25 |
| Snell, Ronald | Labour | 128 | 14.61 |
| Theobald, Craig | Green | 127 | 14.50 |

== 2015 Results ==
The turnout of the election was 70.09%.

| Candidate name: | Party name: | Votes: | % of votes: |
|---|---|---|---|
| Keith WELHAM | Green | 686 | 54.06 |
| Jemma LYNCH | Conservative | 583 | 45.94 |

== See also ==
- Mid Suffolk local elections
