= Wetheringsett Ward =

Electoral ward of Mid Suffolk, England

The candidate information for the Wetheringsett Ward in Mid-Suffolk, Suffolk, England.

== Councillors ==
Election	Member	Party
2011	Charles Mark Wentworth Tilbury	Conservative
2015	Glen Horn	Conservative

== 2011 Results ==
Candidate name:	Party name:	Votes:	% of votes:
Tilbury, Charles Mark Wentworth	Conservative	533	53.57
Turner, Rachel Constance	Green	281	28.24
Ravenhill, Marion Josephine	Labour	128	12.86
Field, Kay Patricia	Liberal Democrat	53	5.33

== 2015 Results ==
The turnout of the election was 74.39%.

Candidate name:	Party name:	Votes:	% of votes:
Glen HORN	Conservative	825	56.05
Peter BROOKE	Green	647	43.95

== See also ==
- Mid Suffolk local elections
