= Rickinghall and Walsham Ward =

Electoral ward of Mid Suffolk, England

The candidate information for the Rickinghall and Walsham Ward in Mid-Suffolk, Suffolk, England. This ward elects two councillors.

== Councillors ==
Election	Member	Party	Member	Party
2011	Sara Michell	Conservative	Derek Osborne	Conservative
2015	Jessica Fleming	Conservative	Derek Osborne	Conservative

== 2011 Results ==
Candidate name:	Party:	Votes:	% of votes:
Michell, Sara	Conservative	1006	32.26
Osborne, Derek	Conservative	971	31.14
Dougall, Eddie	Labour	497	15.94
Stebbing, John	Labour	426	13.66
Truelove, Julia	Liberal Democrat	218	6.99

== 2015 Results ==
The turnout of the election was 70.98%.

Candidate name:	Party name:	Votes:	% of votes: 4445
Derek OSBORNE	Conservative	1425	32.06
Jessica FLEMING	Conservative	1278	28.75
Eddie DOUGALL	Labour	596	13.41
Dominic TOOTH	Green	421	9.47
Harriet BOWES	Green	408	9.18
Julia TRUELOVE	Liberal Democrats	317	7.13

== See also ==
- Mid Suffolk local elections
