= Mendlesham Ward =

Electoral ward in Suffolk, England

The candidate information for the Mendlesham Ward in Mid-Suffolk, Suffolk, England.

== Councillors ==
Election	Member	Party
2011	Andrew Stringer	Green
2015	Andrew Stringer	Green

== 2011 Results ==
Candidate name:	Party:	Votes:	% of votes:
Stringer, Andrew	Green	764	73.96
Fleming, Jessica	Conservative	223	21.59
Martin, Rebecca	Labour	46	4.45

== 2015 Results ==
The turnout of the election was 76.24%.

Candidate name:	Party name:	Votes:	% of votes:
Andrew STRINGER	Green	871	63.16
Paul ALLEN	Conservative	508	36.84

== See also ==
- Mid Suffolk local elections
