= Gislingham Ward =

Electoral ward in Mid Suffolk, England

The candidate information for the Gislingham Ward in Mid-Suffolk, Suffolk, England.

== Councillors ==
Election	Member	Party
2011	Diana Kearsley	Conservative
2015	Diana Kearsley	Conservative

== 2011 Results ==
Candidate name:	Party:	Votes:	% of votes:
Kearsley, Diana	Conservative	696	61.87
Paterson, Ged	Green	184	16.36
O'Keefe, Kevin	Labour	153	13.51
Smith, Linda	Liberal Democrat	93	8.27

== 2015 Results ==
The turnout of the election was 74.67%.

Candidate name:	Party name:	Votes:	% of votes:
Diana KEARSLEY	Conservative	1006	62.37
Rowland WARBOYS	Green	607	37.63

== See also ==
- Mid Suffolk local elections
