= 1987 Mid Suffolk District Council election =

1987 English local government election

- 7 May 1987

All 40 seats to Mid Suffolk District Council 21 seats needed for a majority

	First party	Second party	Third party
Party	Conservative	Independent	Labour
Seats won	19	11	6
Seat change	Steady	▼2	Steady
Popular vote	11,081	5,617	7,990
Percentage	32.5%	16.5%	23.4%
Swing	▲2.6%	▼10.6%	▲2.9%
	Fourth party	Fifth party
Party	Alliance	Ind. Conservative
Seats won	4	0
Seat change	▲3	▼1
Popular vote	8,618	116
Percentage	25.3%	0.3%
Swing	▲7.9%	N/A
- Winner of each seat at the 1987 Mid Suffolk District Council election.
Council control before election
No overall control
Council control after election
No overall control

The 1987 Mid Suffolk District Council election took place on 7 May 1987 to elect members of Mid Suffolk District Council in Suffolk, England. This was on the same day as other local elections.

== Summary ==
=== Election result ===
1987 Mid Suffolk District Council election
Party	Candidates	Seats	Gains	Losses	Net gain/loss	Seats %	Votes %	Votes	+/−
Conservative	24	19	4	4	Steady	47.5	32.5	11,081	+2.6
Independent	15	11	3	5	▼2	27.5	16.5	5,617	–10.6
Labour	39	6	0	0	Steady	15.0	23.4	7,990	+2.9
Alliance	33	4	3	0	▲3	10.0	25.3	8,618	+7.9
Green	6	0	0	0	Steady	0.0	2.1	704	–3.0
Ind. Conservative	1	0	0	1	▼1	0.0	0.3	116	N/A

== Ward results ==
Incumbent councillors standing for re-election are marked with an asterisk (*). Changes in seats do not take into account by-elections or defections.

=== Badwell Ash ===
Badwell Ash
Party	Candidate	Votes	%	±%
Independent	P. Austin	334	56.1	
Alliance	R. Montgomery	216	36.3	
Labour	T. O'Keefe	45	7.6	
Majority		118	19.8	
Turnout		595	48.0	
Registered electors		1,240		
Independent hold		Swing		

=== Barham ===
Barham
Party	Candidate	Votes	%	±%
Conservative	B. Shipp*	427	60.9	
Alliance	B. Ward	165	23.5	
Labour	T. Wilson	109	15.5	
Majority		262	37.4	
Turnout		701	49.0	
Registered electors		1,431		
Conservative hold		Swing		

=== Barking ===
Barking
Party	Candidate	Votes	%	±%
Independent	P. Chapman*	498	76.9	
Alliance	P. Cope	94	14.5	
Labour	P. Carter	56	8.6	
Majority		404	62.4	
Turnout		648	45.0	
Registered electors		1,440		
Independent hold		Swing		

=== Bramford ===
Bramford (2 seats)
Party	Candidate	Votes	%	±%
Conservative	C. Bird*	695	55.5	
Conservative	B. Plummer	640	51.1	
Labour	E. Barker	299	23.9	
Labour	L. Barker	289	23.1	
Alliance	P. Thomas	258	20.6	
Turnout		~1,252	45.0	
Registered electors		2,782		
Conservative hold				
Conservative gain from Independent				

=== Claydon ===
Claydon
Party	Candidate	Votes	%	±%
Conservative	H. Griffiths*	352	59.7	
Labour	J. Wilson	121	20.5	
Alliance	J. Dedman	117	19.8	
Majority		231	39.2	
Turnout		590	44.0	
Registered electors		1,341		
Conservative hold		Swing		

=== Creeting ===
Creeting
Party	Candidate	Votes	%	±%
Conservative	H. Coton	348	55.3	
Alliance	A. Lilley	237	37.7	
Labour	C. Howell	44	7.0	
Majority		111	17.6	
Turnout		629	58.0	
Registered electors		1,084		
Conservative gain from Independent		Swing		

=== Debenham ===
Debenham
Party	Candidate	Votes	%	±%
Conservative	E. Alcock*	488	65.9	
Alliance	D. Nettleton	177	23.9	
Labour	D. Macpherson	76	10.3	
Majority		311	42.0	
Turnout		741	49.0	
Registered electors		1,512		
Conservative hold		Swing		

=== Elmswell ===
Elmswell
Party	Candidate	Votes	%	±%
Independent	D. Dyball*	465	70.1	
Labour	P. Stanners	198	29.9	
Majority		267	40.2	
Turnout		663	36.0	
Registered electors		1,842		
Independent hold		Swing		

=== Eye ===
Eye
Party	Candidate	Votes	%	±%
Independent	C. Flatman*	564	87.7	
Labour	D. McGeever	79	12.3	
Majority		485	75.4	
Turnout		643	44.0	
Registered electors		1,461		
Independent hold		Swing		

=== Fressingfield ===
Fressingfield
Party	Candidate	Votes	%	±%
Independent	R. Marchant*	322	50.1	
Alliance	R. White	181	28.1	
Labour	A. Kerr	73	11.4	
Green	J. Holloway	67	10.4	
Majority		141	22.0	
Turnout		643	51.0	
Registered electors		1,261		
Independent hold		Swing		

=== Gislingham ===
Gislingham
Party	Candidate	Votes	%	±%
Alliance	L. Henniker-Major	492	58.8	
Conservative	C. Vaudrey	345	41.2	
Majority		147	17.6	
Turnout		837	57.0	
Registered electors		1,468		
Alliance gain from Independent		Swing		

=== Haughley & Wetherden ===
Haughley & Wetherden
Party	Candidate	Votes	%	±%
Labour	E. Crascall*	496	55.9	
Conservative	H. Spencer	241	27.2	
Alliance	P. Thomson	150	16.9	
Majority		255	28.7	
Turnout		887	62.0	
Registered electors		1,431		
Labour hold		Swing		

=== Helmingham ===
Helmingham
Party	Candidate	Votes	%	±%
Independent	M. Denyer*	317	65.2	
Alliance	C. Cleverly	115	23.7	
Labour	P. Wheeler	54	11.1	
Majority		202	41.5	
Turnout		486	45.0	
Registered electors		1,080		
Independent gain from Conservative		Swing		

=== Hoxne ===
Hoxne
Party	Candidate	Votes	%	±%
Conservative	D. Harding	361	47.7	
Alliance	M. Breeze	322	42.5	
Labour	R. Millwood	74	9.8	
Majority		39	5.2	
Turnout		757	54.0	
Registered electors		1,402		
Conservative hold		Swing		

=== Mendlesham ===
Mendlesham
Party	Candidate	Votes	%	±%
Independent	A. Braybrooke*	376	54.6	
Alliance	R. Blake	170	24.7	
Labour	J. Langston	100	14.5	
Green	F. Luis	43	6.2	
Majority		206	29.9	
Turnout		689	48.0	
Registered electors		1,435		
Independent hold		Swing		

=== Needham Market ===
Needham Market (2 seats)
Party	Candidate	Votes	%	±%
Conservative	J. Swain*	680	45.1	
Conservative	I. Mason*	629	41.7	
Alliance	G. Miller	498	33.0	
Alliance	J. Finch	418	27.7	
Labour	S. Ceasar	213	14.1	
Labour	D. Ceasar	211	14.0	
Ind. Conservative	W. Dixon	116	7.7	
Turnout		~1,507	47.0	
Registered electors		3,206		
Conservative hold				
Conservative hold				

=== Norton ===
Norton
Party	Candidate	Votes	%	±%
Conservative	B. Siffleet*	397	53.2	
Alliance	R. Wyartt	154	20.6	
Independent	F. Armstrong	122	16.3	
Green	J. Matthissen	44	5.9	
Labour	T. Payne	30	4.0	
Majority		243	32.6	
Turnout		747	49.0	
Registered electors		1,524		
Conservative hold		Swing		

=== Onehouse ===
Onehouse
Party	Candidate	Votes	%	±%
Alliance	R. Townsley	550	85.4	
Labour	C. Howell	94	14.6	
Majority		456	70.8	
Turnout		644	43.0	
Registered electors		1,498		
Alliance gain from Independent		Swing		

=== Palgrave ===
Palgrave
Party	Candidate	Votes	%	±%
Conservative	G. West	334	42.4	
Independent	N. Goodin*	236	29.9	
Alliance	J. Fawcett	150	19.0	
Labour	H. Hepburn	68	8.6	
Majority		98	12.5	
Turnout		788	58.0	
Registered electors		1,359		
Conservative gain from Ind. Conservative		Swing		

=== Rattlesden ===
Rattlesden
Party	Candidate	Votes	%	±%
Conservative	R. Vansittart*	312	42.7	
Alliance	P. Otton	301	41.2	
Labour	J. Woodham	73	10.0	
Green	C. Bornett	44	6.0	
Majority		11	1.5	
Turnout		730	52.0	
Registered electors		1,404		
Conservative hold		Swing		

=== Rickinghall ===
Rickinghall
Party	Candidate	Votes	%	±%
Conservative	B. Pask	348	46.8	
Independent	J. Foster	242	32.5	
Alliance	G. Lockwood	85	11.4	
Labour	J. Hicks	69	9.3	
Majority		106	14.3	
Turnout		744	47.0	
Registered electors		1,583		
Conservative gain from Independent		Swing		

=== Ringshall ===
Ringshall
Party	Candidate	Votes	%	±%
Conservative	R. Wallace	434	67.5	
Alliance	A. Marchant	120	18.7	
Labour	B. Salmon	89	13.8	
Majority		314	48.8	
Turnout		643	44.0	
Registered electors		1,461		
Conservative hold		Swing		

=== Stonham ===
Stonham
Party	Candidate	Votes	%	±%
Alliance	V. Allen	363	51.3	
Independent	F. Morley	321	45.3	
Labour	A. Lewis	24	3.4	
Majority		42	6.0	
Turnout		708	63.0	
Registered electors		1,124		
Alliance gain from Conservative		Swing		

=== Stowmarket Central ===
Stowmarket Central (2 seats)
Party	Candidate	Votes	%	±%
Conservative	J. Cade*	727	33.0	
Independent	D. Perry*	585	26.6	
Alliance	B. Hewitt	466	21.2	
Labour	A. Winchester	425	19.3	
Labour	R. Snell	389	17.7	
Turnout		~2,203	49.0	
Registered electors		4,496		
Conservative hold				
Independent gain from Conservative				

=== Stowmarket North ===
Stowmarket North (2 seats)
Party	Candidate	Votes	%	±%
Labour	B. Jones*	638	44.1	
Labour	E. Jones*	553	38.2	
Conservative	W. Crane	439	30.3	
Alliance	A. Tungate	256	17.7	
Green	J. Clarkson	114	7.9	
Turnout		~1,447	40.0	
Registered electors		3,618		
Labour hold				
Labour hold				

=== Stowmarket South ===
Stowmarket South (2 seats)
Party	Candidate	Votes	%	±%
Labour	E. Nunn*	675	45.7	
Labour	C. Soames*	536	36.3	
Conservative	B. Mayes	420	28.4	
Alliance	E. Shaw	382	25.9	
Alliance	J. Shaw	353	23.9	
Turnout		~1,477	46.0	
Registered electors		3,211		
Labour hold				
Labour hold				

=== Stowupland ===
Stowupland (2 seats)
Party	Candidate	Votes	%	±%
Labour	M. Shave*	856	32.6	
Alliance	J. Jay	768	29.2	
Conservative	J. Finn	610	23.2	
Labour	M. Douglas	405	15.4	
Green	R. Stearn	392	14.9	
Turnout		~2,626	56.0	
Registered electors		4,689		
Labour hold				
Alliance hold				

=== Stradbroke ===
Stradbroke
Party	Candidate	Votes	%	±%
Independent	S. Hawes*	474	90.5	
Labour	P. Davis	50	9.5	
Majority		424	81.0	
Turnout		524	45.0	
Registered electors		1,164		
Independent hold		Swing		

=== Thurston ===
Thurston
Party	Candidate	Votes	%	±%
Conservative	F. Marston*	426	54.5	
Alliance	J. Morland	260	33.3	
Labour	J. Keeble	95	12.2	
Majority		166	21.2	
Turnout		781	46.0	
Registered electors		1,698		
Conservative hold		Swing		

=== Walsham-le-Willows ===
Walsham-le-Willows
Party	Candidate	Votes	%	±%
Conservative	S. Edwards*	511	70.0	
Alliance	R. Barber	148	20.3	
Labour	J. Dougall	71	9.7	
Majority		363	49.7	
Turnout		730	60.0	
Registered electors		1,217		
Conservative hold		Swing		

=== Wetheringsett ===
Wetheringsett
Party	Candidate	Votes	%	±%
Independent	G. Taylor*	390	64.4	
Alliance	S. Morris	116	19.1	
Labour	D. Fearnhead	100	16.5	
Majority		274	45.3	
Turnout		606	49.0	
Registered electors		1,237		
Independent gain from Conservative		Swing		

=== Weybread ===
Weybread
Party	Candidate	Votes	%	±%
Conservative	J. Wellingham*	470	61.0	
Alliance	A. Pietrzak	190	24.6	
Labour	P. Williams	111	14.4	
Majority		280	36.4	
Turnout		771	62.0	
Registered electors		1,244		
Conservative hold		Swing		

=== Woolpit ===
Woolpit
Party	Candidate	Votes	%	±%
Independent	R. Melvin	371	56.5	
Alliance	G. Coleman	235	35.8	
Labour	R. Morris	51	7.8	
Majority		136	20.7	
Turnout		657	54.0	
Registered electors		1,217		
Independent hold		Swing		

=== Worlingworth ===
Worlingworth
Party	Candidate	Votes	%	±%
Conservative	K. Thurman*	447	73.4	
Alliance	D. Wilson	111	18.2	
Labour	A. Cholmondeley	51	8.4	
Majority		336	55.2	
Turnout		609	49.0	
Registered electors		1,243		
Conservative hold		Swing		

== By-elections ==
=== Palgrave ===
Palgrave by-election: 19 May 1988
Party	Candidate	Votes	%	±%
Conservative		269	46.7	
SLD		223	38.7	
Labour		84	14.6	
Majority		46	8.0	
Turnout		576	40.8	
Registered electors		1,412		
Conservative hold		Swing		

=== Needham Market (July 1988) ===
Needham Market by-election: 21 July 1988
Party	Candidate	Votes	%	±%
Conservative		583	48.1	
SLD		392	32.3	
Labour		238	19.6	
Majority		191	15.8	
Turnout		1,213	37.0	
Registered electors		3,278		
Conservative hold		Swing		

=== Onehouse ===
Onehouse by-election: 15 September 1988
Party	Candidate	Votes	%	±%
SLD		342	55.5	
Conservative		247	40.1	
Labour		27	4.4	
Majority		95	15.4	
Turnout		616	37.5	
Registered electors		1,643		
SLD hold		Swing		

=== Needham Market (April 1990) ===
Needham Market by-election: 5 April 1990
Party	Candidate	Votes	%	±%
Liberal Democrats		664	36.0	
Labour		551	29.9	
Conservative		422	22.9	
Independent		207	11.2	
Majority		113	6.1	
Turnout		1,844	54.2	
Registered electors		3,402		
Liberal Democrats gain from Conservative		Swing		

=== Stowmarket South ===
Stowmarket South by-election: 5 July 1990
Party	Candidate	Votes	%	±%
Labour		669	59.8	
Conservative		264	23.6	
Liberal Democrats		186	16.6	
Majority		405	36.2	
Turnout		1,119	37.0	
Registered electors		3,024		
Labour hold		Swing		
