= 2023 Mid Suffolk District Council election =

English local election

- 4 May 2023

All 34 seats to Mid Suffolk District Council 18 seats needed for a majority
- Turnout: 36.9%

	First party	Second party
Leader	Andy Mellen	Suzie Morley (defeated)
Party	Green	Conservative
Last election	12 seats, 34.0%	16 seats, 40.6%
Seats before	12	16
Seats won	24	6
Seat change	▲12	▼10
Popular vote	23,274	11,457
Percentage	56.8%	28.0%
Swing	▲22.8%	▼12.6%
	Third party	Fourth party
Leader	John Field
Party	Liberal Democrats	Independent
Last election	5 seats, 17.7%	1 seat, 3.4%
Seats before	5	1
Seats won	4	0
Seat change	▼1	▼1
Popular vote	4,451	n/a
Percentage	10.9%	n/a
Swing	▼6.8%	n/a
Leader before election
Suzie Morley
Conservative
No overall control
Leader after election
Andy Mellen
Green

The 2023 Mid Suffolk District Council election took place on 4 May 2023 to elect members of Mid Suffolk District Council in Suffolk, England. This was on the same day as other local elections across England.

== Summary ==
=== Background ===
Ahead of the election the council was identified as a target for the Green Party. The council had been under no overall control since the previous election in 2019, and the Conservatives had retained minority control only with the support of the independent councillor and the chair's casting vote. At the 2019 election in the Stowmarket St Peters ward the Conservative candidate had only won by a single vote.

The Green Party launched their local election campaign in Stowmarket on 5 April 2023.

The council had become highly increasingly closely fought in recent years, partly due to local opposition to large-scale housing development and concerns of damage to the rural environment.

=== Election result ===
The Greens won majority control following the election, and the Conservative leader of the council, Suzie Morley, lost her seat. It was the first time in the Green Party's history that they had taken majority control of a council. The Green group leader, Andy Mellen, was formally appointed leader of the council at the subsequent annual council meeting on 22 May 2023.

2023 Mid Suffolk District Council election
Party	Candidates	Seats	Gains	Losses	Net gain/loss	Seats %	Votes %	Votes	+/−
Green	29	24	12	0	▲12	70.6	56.8	23,274	+22.8
Conservative	27	6	0	10	▼10	17.6	28.0	11,457	–12.6
Liberal Democrats	13	4	0	1	▼1	11.8	10.9	4,451	–6.8
Labour	8	0	0	0	Steady	0.0	3.6	1,490	–0.3
Reform	2	0	0	0	Steady	0.0	0.7	303	N/A
Independent	0	0	0	1	▼1	0.0	N/A	N/A	–3.4

== Ward results ==
The Statement of Persons Nominated, which details the candidates standing in each ward, was released by Mid Suffolk District Council following the close of nominations on 5 April 2023. The results were as follows, with an asterisk (*) indicating an incumbent councillor standing for re-election.

=== Bacton ===
Bacton
Party	Candidate	Votes	%	±%
Green	Andy Mellen*	745	75.5	+10.6
Conservative	John Davie-Thornhill	207	21.0	–14.1
Liberal Democrats	David Appleton	35	3.5	N/A
Majority		538	54.5	+24.5
Turnout		992	42.8	+5.6
Registered electors		2,317		
Green hold		Swing	▲12.5	

=== Battisford and Ringshall ===
Battisford & Ringshall
Party	Candidate	Votes	%	±%
Green	Dan Pratt*	608	68.6	+11.5
Conservative	David Whybrow	226	25.5	–17.4
Liberal Democrats	David Payne	52	5.9	N/A
Majority		382	43.1	+39.1
Turnout		888	35.8	+4.3
Registered electors		2,482		
Green hold		Swing	▲14.5	

=== Blakenham ===
Blakenham
Party	Candidate	Votes	%	±%
Liberal Democrats	Adrienne Marriott	434	55.5	+3.8
Conservative	Steven Wells	348	44.5	+15.9
Majority		86	9.0	–14.1
Turnout		792	26.8	–1.4
Registered electors		2,956		
Liberal Democrats hold		Swing	▼6.0	

=== Bramford ===
Bramford
Party	Candidate	Votes	%	±%
Conservative	James Caston*	395	54.3	–3.3
Green	Emma Buckmaster	201	27.6	N/A
Liberal Democrats	Attila Borzak	132	18.1	–24.3
Majority		194	27.0	+11.8
Turnout		732	34.3	+3.1
Registered electors		2,134		
Conservative hold		Swing	▼3.3	

=== Chilton (Stowmarket) ===
Chilton (Stowmarket) (2 seats)
Party	Candidate	Votes	%	±%
Green	Terence Carter*	1,062	71.7	+23.4
Green	David Napier	998	67.4	N/A
Conservative	Vikash Mantha	426	28.8	–19.9
Turnout		1,481	30.1	+4.6
Registered electors		4,923		
Green hold				
Green gain from Conservative				

=== Claydon and Barham ===
Claydon & Barham (2 seats)
Party	Candidate	Votes	%	±%
Green	David Penny	708	42.9	+2.8
Conservative	John Whitehead*	654	39.6	–13.8
Green	Benjamin MacKinnon	624	37.8	N/A
Conservative	Nick Gowrley	572	34.6	–16.5
Liberal Democrats	Martin Wheatley	223	13.5	–17.0
Labour	Terence Wilson	185	11.2	N/A
Liberal Democrats	David Poulson	144	8.7	N/A
Turnout		1,651	35.3	+4.3
Registered electors		4,682		
Green gain from Conservative				
Conservative hold				

=== Combs Ford (Stowmarket) ===
Combs Ford (Stowmarket) (2 seats)
Party	Candidate	Votes	%	±%
Liberal Democrats	Keith Scarff*	1,059	70.1	+31.6
Green	Miles Row	1,029	68.1	+37.4
Conservative	Kieren Lathangue-Clayton	672	44.5	+13.8
Reform	David Card	250	16.5	N/A
Turnout		1,511	32.5	+2.0
Registered electors		4,648		
Liberal Democrats hold				
Green gain from Independent				

=== Debenham ===
Debenham
Party	Candidate	Votes	%	±%
Green	Teresa Davis	684	61.9	N/A
Conservative	Henry Dobell	421	38.1	–32.0
Majority		263	23.8	N/A
Turnout		1,108	45.0	+8.0
Registered electors		2,463		
Green gain from Conservative				

=== Elmswell and Woolpit ===
Elmswell & Woolpit (2 seats)
Party	Candidate	Votes	%	±%
Green	Sarah Mansel*	1,583	76.7	+17.1
Green	Jen Overett	1,358	65.8	+11.0
Conservative	Jason Duggan	623	30.2	–12.4
Turnout		2,065	37.2	+2.2
Registered electors		5,558		
Green hold				
Green hold				

=== Eye ===
Eye
Party	Candidate	Votes	%	±%
Green	Lucy Elkin	693	70.2	N/A
Conservative	Kev Crispin	294	29.8	–23.1
Majority		399	40.0	N/A
Turnout		995	44.2	
Registered electors		2,249		
Green gain from Conservative				

=== Fressingfield ===
Fressingfield
Party	Candidate	Votes	%	±%
Conservative	Lavinia Hadingham*	546	51.5	–3.3
Green	Colin MacKinnon	515	48.5	+26.7
Majority		31	3.0	–30.0
Turnout		1,071	44.7	+4.5
Registered electors		2,397		
Conservative hold		Swing	▼15.0	

=== Gislingham ===
Gislingham
Party	Candidate	Votes	%	±%
Green	Rowland Warboys*	792	71.5	+22.7
Conservative	Anne-Marie Hogan	315	28.5	–12.1
Majority		477	43.0	+34.6
Turnout		1,122	42.8	+1.8
Registered electors		2,622		
Green hold		Swing	▲17.4	

=== Haughley, Stowupland and Wetherden ===
Haughley, Stowupland & Wetherden (2 seats)
Party	Candidate	Votes	%	±%
Green	Rachel Eburne*	1,407	80.2	+2.0
Green	Janet Pearson	1,210	69.0	–4.2
Conservative	Lesley Canham	425	24.2	+4.9
Turnout		1,754	36.0	–4.0
Registered electors		4,866		
Green hold				
Green hold				

=== Hoxne and Worlingworth ===
Hoxne & Worlingworth
Party	Candidate	Votes	%	±%
Conservative	Matthew Hicks*	509	51.2	–7.7
Green	Charlie Meyer	287	28.9	+8.8
Liberal Democrats	Steve Card	97	9.8	–2.1
Labour	Stephen Nixon	92	9.3	+0.2
Majority		222	22.3	–15.2
Turnout		994	42.6	+1.9
Registered electors		2,334		
Conservative hold		Swing	▼8.3	

=== Mendlesham ===
Mendlesham
Party	Candidate	Votes	%	±%
Green	Andrew Stringer*	816	79.1	+7.1
Conservative	Paul Allen	215	20.8	–7.2
Majority		601	58.2	+14.4
Turnout		1,032	41.6	–7.9
Registered electors		2,479		
Green hold		Swing	+7.1	

=== Needham Market ===
Needham Market (2 seats)
Party	Candidate	Votes	%	±%
Green	Ross Piper	943	53.2	N/A
Liberal Democrats	Terry Lawrence	673	37.9	–25.6
Liberal Democrats	Sylvie Watson	636	35.9	–24.4
Conservative	Kay Oakes	564	31.8	–1.3
Turnout		1,774	34.4	+6.2
Registered electors		5,160		
Green gain from Liberal Democrats				
Liberal Democrats hold				

=== Onehouse ===
Onehouse
Party	Candidate	Votes	%	±%
Green	John Matthissen*	534	58.6	+3.0
Conservative	James Spencer	283	31.0	+1.6
Labour	Rob Davies	87	9.5	N/A
Majority		251	27.5	+1.7
Turnout		912	39.3	+0.9
Registered electors		2,318		
Green hold		Swing	▲0.7	

=== Palgrave ===
Palgrave
Party	Candidate	Votes	%	±%
Green	Tim Weller	536	51.9	+10.0
Conservative	Tim Passmore	444	43.0	–15.1
Reform	Evan Heasley	53	5.1	N/A
Majority		92	9.0	N/A
Turnout		1,034	43.8	+6.9
Registered electors		2,360		
Green gain from Conservative		Swing	▲12.6	

=== Rattlesden ===
Rattlesden
Party	Candidate	Votes	%	±%
Liberal Democrats	Nicky Willshere	694	65.4	+2.0
Conservative	Stephen Gerrish	351	33.1	+7.4
Majority		343	32.3	+5.0
Turnout		1,061	42.5	+1.6
Registered electors		2,497		
Liberal Democrats hold		Swing	▼2.7	

=== Rickinghall ===
Rickinghall
Party	Candidate	Votes	%	±%
Conservative	Gilly Morgan	466	53.0	−9.4
Labour	Bob Caley	395	44.9	+7.3
Majority		71	8.1	−15.6
Turnout		879	36.7	+1.4
Registered electors		2,396		
Conservative hold		Swing	-9.4	

=== St Peters (Stowmarket) ===
St Peters (Stowmarket)
Party	Candidate	Votes	%	±%
Green	Ollie Walters	589	73.7	N/A
Conservative	Richard Stevens	210	26.3	–23.8
Majority		379	47.4	N/A
Turnout		808	35.5	+9.7
Registered electors		2,275		
Green gain from Conservative				

=== Stonham ===
Stonham
Party	Candidate	Votes	%	±%
Green	Nicholas Hardingham	615	59.5	+26.5
Conservative	Suzie Morley*	419	40.5	–3.5
Majority		196	19.0	N/A
Turnout		1,045	45.2	+5.4
Registered electors		2,313		
Green gain from Conservative		Swing	▲15.0	

=== Stow Thorney (Stowmarket) ===
Stow Thorney (Stowmarket) (2 seats)
Party	Candidate	Votes	%	±%
Green	Colin Lay	662	59.3	+14.0
Green	James Patchett	525	47.0	N/A
Conservative	Steve Runciman	359	32.2	−19.6
Labour	Will Howman	280	25.1	−0.9
Turnout		1116	26.5	+4.5
Registered electors		4,209		
Green gain from Conservative				
Green hold				

=== Stadbroke and Laxfield ===
Stadbroke & Laxfield
Party	Candidate	Votes	%	±%
Conservative	Anders Linder	441	46.7	−21.5
Green	Gemma Whitehouse	263	27.9	N/A
Labour	Paul Theaker	155	16.4	N/A
Liberal Democrats	James Fawcett	82	8.7	−30.1
Majority		178	18.9	−16.0
Turnout		944	37.1	−1.7
Registered electors		2,546		
Conservative hold		Swing	▼21.5	

=== Thurston ===
Thurston (2 seats)
Party	Candidate	Votes	%	±%
Green	David Bradbury	1,288	34.7	−10.9
Green	Austin Davies*	1,224	33.0	+5.7
Conservative	Harry Richardson*	716	19.3	−20.1
Liberal Democrats	Oliver Hurdwell	190	5.1	−7.7
Labour	Philip Cockell	164	4.4	−4.1
Labour	Jean Staff	132	3.6	
Turnout		3714	40.6	+5.1
Registered electors		5,193		
Green hold				
Green gain from Conservative				

=== Walsham-le-Willows ===
Walsham-le-Willows
Party	Candidate	Votes	%	±%
Green	Richard Winch	775	68.5	+43.7
Conservative	Philippa Wilding	356	31.5	−19.3
Majority		419	37.0	
Turnout		1140	42.7	+9.4
Registered electors		2,672		
Green gain from Conservative		Swing		

== Post-election changes ==
=== By-elections ===
==== Chilton ====
Chilton by-election: 2 May 2024
Party	Candidate	Votes	%	±%
Green	Lorraine Baker	589	47.2	–24.2
Conservative	Steven Runciman	375	30.0	+1.4
Labour	William Howman	285	22.8	N/A
Majority		214	17.2	N/A
Turnout		1,255	25.0	–5.1
Registered electors		5,021		
Green hold		Swing	▼12.8	

==== Thurston ====
Thurston by-election: 24 September 2024
Party	Candidate	Votes	%	±%
Conservative	Harold Richardson	579	49.2	+18.4
Green	Oscar Barrick-Cook	518	44.0	–11.4
Labour	Nathan Hope	79	6.7	+1.0
Majority		61	5.2	N/A
Turnout		1,182	21.0	–19.6
Registered electors		5,628		
Conservative gain from Green		Swing	▲14.9	

==== Haughley, Stowupland and Wetherden ====
Haughley, Stowupland & Wetherden by-election: 12 June 2025
Party	Candidate	Votes	%	±%
Green	Agnes Watson	901	64.1	−12.7
Conservative	Kieren Clayton	444	31.6	+8.4
Liberal Democrats	Timothy Glenton	61	4.3	new
Majority		457	32.5	
Turnout		1,406	27.1	−8.9
Registered electors		5,222		
Green hold				
