= 1995 Mid Suffolk District Council election =

1995 English local government election

- 4 May 1995

All 40 seats to Mid Suffolk District Council 21 seats needed for a majority

	First party	Second party
Party	Labour	Liberal Democrats
Seats won	17	12
Seat change	▲9	▲2
Popular vote	12,917	8,085
Percentage	43.6%	27.3%
Swing	▲14.1%	▲2.7%
	Third party	Fourth party
Party	Conservative	Independent
Seats won	6	5
Seat change	▼11	Steady
Popular vote	6,403	1,895
Percentage	21.6%	6.4%
Swing	▼15.4%	▼2.0%
- Winner of each seat at the 1995 Mid Suffolk District Council election.
Control before election
No overall control
Control after election
No overall control

The 1995 Mid Suffolk District Council election took place on 4 May 1995 to elect members of Mid Suffolk District Council in Suffolk, England. This was on the same day as other local elections.

== Summary ==
=== Election result ===
1995 Mid Suffolk District Council election
Party	Candidates	Seats	Gains	Losses	Net gain/loss	Seats %	Votes %	Votes	+/−
Labour	34	17	9	0	▲9	42.5	43.6	12,917	+14.1
Liberal Democrats	22	12	4	2	▲2	30.0	27.3	8,085	+2.7
Conservative	23	6	1	12	▼11	15.0	21.6	6,403	–15.4
Independent	6	5	1	1	Steady	12.5	6.4	1,895	–2.0
Green	1	0	0	0	Steady	0.0	1.2	356	+0.6

== Ward results ==
Incumbent councillors standing for re-election are marked with an asterisk (*). Changes in seats do not take into account by-elections or defections.

=== Badwell Ash ===
Badwell Ash
Party	Candidate	Votes	%	±%
Independent	P. Austin*	346	62.3	
Labour	C. Descombes	209	37.7	
Majority		137	24.7	
Turnout		555	43.7	
Registered electors		1,269		
Independent hold		Swing		

=== Barham ===
Barham
Party	Candidate	Votes	%	±%
Liberal Democrats	N. Ramsden	285	36.2	
Conservative	B. Shipp*	261	33.2	
Labour	P. Cooper	241	30.6	
Majority		24	3.0	
Turnout		787	46.0	
Registered electors		1,711		
Liberal Democrats gain from Conservative		Swing		

=== Barking ===
Barking
Party	Candidate	Votes	%	±%
Liberal Democrats	V. Hoy	305	43.8	
Conservative	A. Pratt	227	32.6	
Labour	D. Lee	164	23.6	
Majority		78	11.2	
Turnout		696	45.5	
Registered electors		1,530		
Liberal Democrats gain from Independent		Swing		

=== Bramford ===
Bramford (2 seats)
Party	Candidate	Votes	%	±%
Labour	T. Green	436	39.5	
Labour	C. Curl	426	38.6	
Conservative	C. Bird*	337	30.5	
Conservative	B. Plummer*	306	27.7	
Liberal Democrats	P. Sands	267	24.2	
Liberal Democrats	J. Wishart	261	23.6	
Turnout		~1,105	38.0	
Registered electors		2,908		
Labour gain from Conservative				
Labour gain from Conservative				

=== Claydon ===
Claydon
Party	Candidate	Votes	%	±%
Labour	T. Wilson	343	54.9	
Conservative	J. Williams	282	45.1	
Majority		61	9.8	
Turnout		625	41.4	
Registered electors		1,509		
Labour gain from Conservative		Swing		

=== Creeting ===
Creeting
Party	Candidate	Votes	%	±%
Liberal Democrats	A. Lilley*	338	55.1	
Conservative	R. Vickery	183	29.9	
Labour	A. Lewis	92	15.0	
Majority		155	25.3	
Turnout		613	52.2	
Registered electors		1,175		
Liberal Democrats hold		Swing		

=== Debenham ===
Debenham
Party	Candidate	Votes	%	±%
Liberal Democrats	C. Cleverly*	360	58.8	
Independent	C. Cooksley	141	23.0	
Labour	J. Robinson	111	18.1	
Majority		219	35.8	
Turnout		612	35.1	
Registered electors		1,746		
Liberal Democrats gain from Conservative		Swing		

=== Elmswell ===
Elmswell
Party	Candidate	Votes	%	±%
Labour	R. Durrant	350	34.4	
Independent	P. Dow	316	31.0	
Liberal Democrats	C. Ward	184	18.1	
Conservative	R. Cook*	168	16.5	
Majority		34	3.3	
Turnout		1,018	43.0	
Registered electors		2,366		
Labour gain from Conservative		Swing		

=== Eye ===
Eye
Party	Candidate	Votes	%	±%
Independent	C. Flatman*	344	51.3	
Labour	M. Carr	326	48.7	
Majority		18	2.7	
Turnout		670	44.0	
Registered electors		1,521		
Independent hold		Swing		

=== Fressingfield ===
Fressingfield
Party	Candidate	Votes	%	±%
Independent	G. Frost*	419	55.9	
Liberal Democrats	H. Stewart	216	28.8	
Labour	K. Herod	114	15.2	
Majority		203	27.1	
Turnout		749	50.6	
Registered electors		1,480		
Independent hold		Swing		

=== Gislingham ===
Gislingham
Party	Candidate	Votes	%	±%
Labour	T. O'Keefe	343	45.9	
Liberal Democrats	B. Netscher	246	32.9	
Conservative	H. Ayres*	159	21.3	
Majority		97	13.0	
Turnout		748	42.9	
Registered electors		1,742		
Labour gain from Liberal Democrats		Swing		

=== Haughley & Wetherden ===
Haughley & Wetherden
Party	Candidate	Votes	%	±%
Labour	E. Crascall*	Unopposed		
Registered electors		1,564		
Labour hold				

=== Helmingham ===
Helmingham
Party	Candidate	Votes	%	±%
Conservative	M. Raine*	215	44.7	
Liberal Democrats	L. Jones	180	37.4	
Labour	C. Hammond	86	17.9	
Majority		35	7.3	
Turnout		481	41.5	
Registered electors		1,158		
Conservative hold		Swing		

=== Hoxne ===
Hoxne
Party	Candidate	Votes	%	±%
Liberal Democrats	J. Craven*	457	71.5	
Conservative	M. Campbell-Preston	182	28.5	
Majority		275	43.0	
Turnout		639	43.4	
Registered electors		1,471		
Liberal Democrats hold		Swing		

=== Mendlesham ===
Mendlesham
Party	Candidate	Votes	%	±%
Labour	J. Barker	389	54.0	
Independent	M. Ribbons	332	46.0	
Majority		57	7.9	
Turnout		721	45.5	
Registered electors		1,586		
Labour gain from Conservative		Swing		

=== Needham Market ===
Needham Market (2 seats)
Party	Candidate	Votes	%	±%
Liberal Democrats	W. Marchant*	939	61.6	
Liberal Democrats	D. Stannard	750	49.2	
Labour	D. Hill	373	24.5	
Labour	G. Fisk	283	18.6	
Conservative	D. Burch	233	15.3	
Turnout		~1,524	43.0	
Registered electors		3,560		
Liberal Democrats hold				
Liberal Democrats hold				

=== Norton ===
Norton
Party	Candidate	Votes	%	±%
Conservative	B. Siffleet*	415	49.1	
Labour	E. Dykes	294	34.8	
Liberal Democrats	P. Carlisle	137	16.2	
Majority		121	14.3	
Turnout		846	50.2	
Registered electors		1,684		
Conservative hold		Swing		

=== Onehouse ===
Onehouse
Party	Candidate	Votes	%	±%
Liberal Democrats	R. Cray	288	39.3	
Conservative	J. Sinclair	232	31.7	
Labour	J. Rogers	213	29.1	
Majority		56	7.6	
Turnout		733	44.0	
Registered electors		1,665		
Liberal Democrats hold		Swing		

=== Palgrave ===
Palgrave
Party	Candidate	Votes	%	±%
Conservative	C. Michell	238	37.3	
Liberal Democrats	J. Roche	232	36.4	
Labour	C. Wright	168	26.3	
Majority		6	0.9	
Turnout		638	43.0	
Registered electors		1,484		
Conservative gain from Liberal Democrats		Swing		

=== Rattlesden ===
Rattlesden
Party	Candidate	Votes	%	±%
Liberal Democrats	P. Otton*	459	57.8	
Conservative	J. Drinkwater	192	24.2	
Labour	G. Briggs	143	18.0	
Majority		267	33.6	
Turnout		794	54.0	
Registered electors		1,470		
Liberal Democrats hold		Swing		

=== Rickinghall ===
Rickinghall
Party	Candidate	Votes	%	±%
Conservative	B. Pask*	406	50.5	
Labour	R. Hill	398	49.5	
Majority		8	1.0	
Turnout		804	40.5	
Registered electors		1,986		
Conservative hold		Swing		

=== Ringshall ===
Ringshall
Party	Candidate	Votes	%	±%
Liberal Democrats	M. Turner	500	70.3	
Conservative	P. Joslin	133	18.7	
Labour	P. Carter	78	11.0	
Majority		367	51.6	
Turnout		711	41.1	
Registered electors		1,728		
Liberal Democrats hold		Swing		

=== Stonham ===
Stonham
Party	Candidate	Votes	%	±%
Liberal Democrats	A. Fowler	379	70.3	
Conservative	T. Passmore	160	29.7	
Majority		219	40.6	
Turnout		539	41.3	
Registered electors		1,303		
Liberal Democrats hold		Swing		

=== Stowmarket Central ===
Stowmarket Central (2 seats)
Party	Candidate	Votes	%	±%
Labour	A. Olney*	626	43.4	
Labour	R. Snell*	624	43.3	
Liberal Democrats	K. Scarff	463	32.1	
Conservative	G. Boatfield	455	31.6	
Turnout		~1,322	36.0	
Registered electors		3,673		
Labour hold				
Labour hold				

=== Stowmarket North ===
Stowmarket North (2 seats)
Party	Candidate	Votes	%	±%
Labour	R. Jones*	842	71.8	
Labour	E. Jones*	824	70.3	
Liberal Democrats	G. Cray	330	28.2	
Turnout		~1,173	32.0	
Registered electors		3,633		
Labour hold				
Labour hold				

=== Stowmarket South ===
Stowmarket South (2 seats)
Party	Candidate	Votes	%	±%
Labour	E. Nunn*	756	59.8	
Labour	S. Britton*	600	47.5	
Liberal Democrats	B. McKinlay	509	40.2	
Turnout		~1,265	35.0	
Registered electors		3,421		
Labour hold				
Labour hold				

=== Stowupland ===
Stowupland (2 seats)
Party	Candidate	Votes	%	±%
Labour	M. Shave*	1,081	60.2	
Labour	C. Jones*	874	48.7	
Conservative	N. Major	358	19.9	
Green	R. Stearn	356	19.8	
Turnout		~1,547	46.0	
Registered electors		3,362		
Labour hold				
Labour gain from Conservative				

=== Stradbroke ===
Stradbroke
Party	Candidate	Votes	%	±%
Conservative	S. Gemmill*	406	62.5	
Labour	C. Thornber	244	37.5	
Majority		162	24.9	
Turnout		650	52.6	
Registered electors		1,236		
Conservative hold		Swing		

=== Thurston ===
Thurston
Party	Candidate	Votes	%	±%
Labour	D. Stevenson	492	55.8	
Conservative	R. Bowden	390	44.2	
Majority		102	11.6	
Turnout		882	39.9	
Registered electors		2,210		
Labour gain from Conservative		Swing		

=== Walsham-le-Willows ===
Walsham-le-Willows
Party	Candidate	Votes	%	±%
Conservative	A. Russell*	465	55.4	
Labour	J. Dougall	374	44.6	
Majority		91	10.8	
Turnout		839	50.9	
Registered electors		1,649		
Conservative hold		Swing		

=== Wetheringsett ===
Wetheringsett
Party	Candidate	Votes	%	±%
Labour	M. Ravenhill	254	50.3	
Conservative	R. Passmore*	251	49.7	
Majority		3	0.6	
Turnout		505	38.2	
Registered electors		1,324		
Labour gain from Conservative		Swing		

=== Weybread ===
Weybread
Party	Candidate	Votes	%	±%
Independent	S. Kent	391	60.2	
Labour	G. Deeks	258	39.8	
Majority		133	20.5	
Turnout		649	49.8	
Registered electors		1,304		
Independent gain from Conservative		Swing		

=== Woolpit ===
Woolpit
Party	Candidate	Votes	%	±%
Independent	R. Melvin*	433	68.2	
Labour	S. Robinson	202	31.8	
Majority		231	36.4	
Turnout		635	42.4	
Registered electors		1,497		
Independent hold		Swing		

=== Worlingworth ===
Worlingworth
Party	Candidate	Votes	%	±%
Liberal Democrats	H. Whitworth	288	52.7	
Independent	P. Debenham*	258	47.3	
Majority		30	5.5	
Turnout		546	43.6	
Registered electors		1,253		
Liberal Democrats gain from Conservative		Swing		

== By-elections ==
=== Haughley & Wetherden ===
Haughley & Wetherden by-election: 13 July 1995
Party	Candidate	Votes	%	±%
Labour		340	50.8	
Conservative		169	25.3	
Independent		160	23.9	
Majority		171	25.5	
Turnout		669	43.0	
Registered electors		1,556		
Labour hold		Swing		

=== Stowmarket Central ===
Stowmarket Central by-election: 2 May 1996
Party	Candidate	Votes	%	±%
Labour		637	44.2	
Conservative		483	33.5	
Liberal Democrats		322	22.3	
Majority		154	10.7	
Turnout		1,442	39.3	
Registered electors		3,669		
Labour hold		Swing		

=== Badwell Ash ===
Badwell Ash by-election: 27 February 1997
Party	Candidate	Votes	%	±%
Conservative		292	44.4	
Labour		184	28.0	
Liberal Democrats		182	27.7	
Majority		108	16.4	
Turnout		658	51.0	
Registered electors		1,290		
Conservative gain from Independent		Swing		
