= 1991 Mid Suffolk District Council election =

Mid Suffolk District Council election

- 2 May 1991

40 seats to Mid Suffolk District Council 21 seats needed for a majority

	First party	Second party
Party	Conservative	Liberal Democrats
Last election	19 seats, 32.5%	4 seats, 23.9%
Seats won	17	10
Seat change	▼2	▲6
Popular vote	12,251	8,131
Percentage	37.0%	24.6%
Swing	▲4.5%	▼0.7%
	Third party	Fourth party
Party	Labour	Independent
Last election	6 seats, 23.4%	11 seats, 16.5%
Seats won	8	5
Seat change	▲2	▼6
Popular vote	9,756	2,768
Percentage	29.5%	8.4%
Swing	▲6.1%	▼8.1%
- Winner of each seat at the 1991 Mid Suffolk District Council election.
Control before election
No overall control
Control after election
No overall control

The 1991 Mid Suffolk District Council election took place on 2 May 1991 to elect members of Mid Suffolk District Council in Suffolk, England. This was on the same day as other local elections.

== Summary ==
=== Election result ===
1991 Mid Suffolk District Council election
Party	Candidates	Seats	Gains	Losses	Net gain/loss	Seats %	Votes %	Votes	+/−
Conservative	35	17	6	8	▼2	42.5	37.0	12,251	+4.5
Liberal Democrats	23	10	7	1	▲6	25.0	24.6	8,131	–0.7
Labour	27	8	2	0	▲2	20.0	29.5	9,756	+6.1
Independent	9	5	0	6	▼6	12.5	8.4	2,768	–8.1
Green	1	0	0	0	Steady	0.0	0.6	192	–1.5

4 Conservatives and 1 Independent were elected unopposed.

== Ward results ==
Incumbent councillors standing for re-election are marked with an asterisk (*). Changes in seats do not take into account by-elections or defections.

=== Badwell Ash ===
Badwell Ash
Party	Candidate	Votes	%	±%
Independent	P. Austin*	Unopposed		
Registered electors		1,214		
Independent hold				

=== Barham ===
Barham
Party	Candidate	Votes	%	±%
Conservative	B. Shipp*	291	43.0	
Liberal Democrats	N. Ramsden	222	32.8	
Labour	P. Williams	163	24.1	
Majority		69	10.2	
Turnout		686	45.0	
Registered electors		1,525		
Conservative hold		Swing		

=== Barking ===
Barking
Party	Candidate	Votes	%	±%
Independent	P. Chapman*	410	64.3	
Liberal Democrats	J. Fisher	122	19.1	
Labour	P. Carter	106	16.6	
Majority		288	45.1	
Turnout		645	44.0	
Registered electors		1,465		
Independent hold		Swing		

=== Bramford ===
Bramford (2 seats)
Party	Candidate	Votes	%	±%
Conservative	B. Plummer*	Unopposed		
Conservative	C. Bird*	Unopposed		
Registered electors		2,947		
Conservative hold				
Conservative hold				

=== Claydon ===
Claydon
Party	Candidate	Votes	%	±%
Conservative	H. Griffiths*	307	54.3	
Labour	T. Wilson	167	29.6	
Liberal Democrats	M. Redbond	91	16.1	
Majority		140	24.8	
Turnout		561	38.0	
Registered electors		1,475		
Conservative hold		Swing		

=== Creeting ===
Creeting
Party	Candidate	Votes	%	±%
Liberal Democrats	A. Lilley	399	61.0	
Conservative	G. Bennett	255	39.0	
Majority		144	22.0	
Turnout		656	57.0	
Registered electors		1,151		
Liberal Democrats gain from Conservative		Swing		

=== Debenham ===
Debenham
Party	Candidate	Votes	%	±%
Conservative	E. Alcock*	474	61.2	
Liberal Democrats	S. Comer	300	38.8	
Majority		174	22.5	
Turnout		788	48.0	
Registered electors		1,641		
Conservative hold		Swing		

=== Elmswell ===
Elmswell
Party	Candidate	Votes	%	±%
Conservative	R. Cook	406	47.8	
Labour	S. Robinson	277	32.6	
Liberal Democrats	G. Serjeant	166	19.6	
Majority		129	15.2	
Turnout		857	41.0	
Registered electors		2,090		
Conservative gain from Independent		Swing		

=== Eye ===
Eye
Party	Candidate	Votes	%	±%
Independent	C. Flatman*	267	37.7	
Liberal Democrats	S. Morris	200	28.2	
Conservative	M. Whant	135	19.0	
Labour	S. Reeves	107	15.1	
Majority		67	9.4	
Turnout		727	49.0	
Registered electors		1,484		
Independent hold		Swing		

=== Fressingfield ===
Fressingfield
Party	Candidate	Votes	%	±%
Independent	G. Frost	472	74.3	
Labour	E. Millwood	163	25.7	
Majority		309	48.7	
Turnout		641	47.0	
Registered electors		1,363		
Independent hold		Swing		

=== Gislingham ===
Gislingham
Party	Candidate	Votes	%	±%
Liberal Democrats	L. Henniker-Major*	386	43.6	
Conservative	P. Farmer	296	33.4	
Labour	T. O'Keefe	204	23.0	
Majority		90	10.2	
Turnout		885	54.0	
Registered electors		1,638		
Liberal Democrats hold		Swing		

=== Haughley & Wetherden ===
Haughley & Wetherden
Party	Candidate	Votes	%	±%
Labour	E. Crascall*	577	73.8	
Conservative	R. Bowden	205	26.2	
Majority		372	47.6	
Turnout		782	52.0	
Registered electors		1,503		
Labour hold		Swing		

=== Helmingham ===
Helmingham
Party	Candidate	Votes	%	±%
Conservative	M. Raine	Unopposed		
Registered electors		1,157		
Conservative gain from Independent				

=== Hoxne ===
Hoxne
Party	Candidate	Votes	%	±%
Liberal Democrats	J. Craven	452	56.3	
Conservative	D. Harding*	351	43.7	
Majority		101	12.6	
Turnout		803	57.0	
Registered electors		1,401		
Liberal Democrats gain from Conservative		Swing		

=== Mendlesham ===
Mendlesham
Party	Candidate	Votes	%	±%
Conservative	E. Bauly	519	61.9	
Labour	J. Barker	320	38.1	
Majority		199	23.7	
Turnout		848	56.0	
Registered electors		1,514		
Conservative gain from Independent		Swing		

=== Needham Market ===
Needham Market (2 seats)
Party	Candidate	Votes	%	±%
Liberal Democrats	W. Marchant*	968	50.1	
Liberal Democrats	R. Scott*	679	35.1	
Conservative	T. Watts	461	23.8	
Conservative	P. Redman	419	21.7	
Labour	S. Caesar	295	15.3	
Independent	I. Mason	210	10.9	
Turnout		~1,704	50.0	
Registered electors		3,407		
Liberal Democrats gain from Conservative				
Liberal Democrats gain from Conservative				

=== Norton ===
Norton
Party	Candidate	Votes	%	±%
Conservative	B. Siffleet*	490	60.9	
Labour	S. Palmer	315	39.1	
Majority		175	21.7	
Turnout		823	50.0	
Registered electors		1,645		
Conservative hold		Swing		

=== Onehouse ===
Onehouse
Party	Candidate	Votes	%	±%
Liberal Democrats	J. How*	604	75.4	
Conservative	V. Waspe	197	24.6	
Majority		407	50.8	
Turnout		801	50.8	
Registered electors		1,577		
Liberal Democrats hold		Swing		

=== Palgrave ===
Palgrave
Party	Candidate	Votes	%	±%
Liberal Democrats	D. Wells	323	42.3	
Conservative	M. Webbe	313	41.0	
Labour	D. McGeever	127	16.6	
Majority		10	1.3	
Turnout		769	54.0	
Registered electors		1,424		
Liberal Democrats gain from Conservative		Swing		

=== Rattlesden ===
Rattlesden
Party	Candidate	Votes	%	±%
Liberal Democrats	P. Otton	479	59.7	
Conservative	R. Vansittart*	240	29.9	
Labour	J. Woodham	83	10.3	
Majority		239	29.8	
Turnout		804	55.0	
Registered electors		1,462		
Liberal Democrats gain from Conservative		Swing		

=== Rickinghall ===
Rickinghall
Party	Candidate	Votes	%	±%
Conservative	B. Pask*	561	63.2	
Labour	J. Stratford	327	36.8	
Majority		234	26.4	
Turnout		893	50.0	
Registered electors		1,785		
Conservative hold		Swing		

=== Ringshall ===
Ringshall
Party	Candidate	Votes	%	±%
Liberal Democrats	M. Turner	351	46.6	
Conservative	R. Wallace*	337	44.7	
Labour	B. Salmon	66	8.8	
Majority		14	1.9	
Turnout		762	52.0	
Registered electors		1,466		
Liberal Democrats gain from Conservative		Swing		

=== Stonham ===
Stonham
Party	Candidate	Votes	%	±%
Liberal Democrats	B. Ward	356	57.6	
Conservative	D. Burch	262	42.4	
Majority		94	15.2	
Turnout		622	51.0	
Registered electors		1,220		
Liberal Democrats hold		Swing		

=== Stowmarket Central ===
Stowmarket Central (2 seats)
Party	Candidate	Votes	%	±%
Labour	A. Olney	638	36.3	
Labour	R. Snell	633	36.0	
Conservative	J. Cade*	591	33.6	
Conservative	D. Perry*	501	28.5	
Liberal Democrats	R. Cray	338	19.2	
Green	D. Buckfield	192	10.9	
Turnout		~1,571	44.0	
Registered electors		3,570		
Labour gain from Conservative				
Labour gain from Independent				

=== Stowmarket North ===
Stowmarket North (2 seats)
Party	Candidate	Votes	%	±%
Labour	R. Jones*	742	56.1	
Labour	E. Jones*	712	53.9	
Conservative	W. Crane	366	27.7	
Conservative	R. Godfree	352	26.6	
Liberal Democrats	G. Cray	215	16.3	
Liberal Democrats	M. Wilson	189	14.3	
Turnout		~1,361	40.0	
Registered electors		3,402		
Labour hold				
Labour hold				

=== Stowmarket South ===
Stowmarket South (2 seats)
Party	Candidate	Votes	%	±%
Labour	E. Nunn*	795	49.4	
Labour	S. Wicker*	649	40.3	
Liberal Democrats	J. Shaw	411	25.5	
Conservative	B. Mayes	404	25.1	
Conservative	L. Mayes	397	24.7	
Turnout		~1,424	42.0	
Registered electors		3,390		
Labour hold				
Labour hold				

=== Stowupland ===
Stowupland (2 seats)
Party	Candidate	Votes	%	±%
Labour	M. Shave*	1,006	39.0	
Conservative	I. Hendry	548	21.2	
Liberal Democrats	J. Jay*	546	21.2	
Labour	C. Descombes	536	20.8	
Independent	R. Stearn	480	18.6	
Turnout		~1,799	54.0	
Registered electors		3,331		
Labour hold				
Conservative gain from Liberal Democrats				

=== Stradbroke ===
Stradbroke
Party	Candidate	Votes	%	±%
Conservative	S. Gemmill	409	63.8	
Liberal Democrats	H. Whitworth	232	36.2	
Majority		177	27.6	
Turnout		537	45.0	
Registered electors		1,194		
Conservative gain from Independent		Swing		

=== Thurston ===
Thurston
Party	Candidate	Votes	%	±%
Conservative	F. Marston*	519	65.6	
Independent	P. Carlisle	272	34.4	
Majority		247	31.2	
Turnout		793	40.0	
Registered electors		1,982		
Conservative hold		Swing		

=== Walsham-le-Willows ===
Walsham-le-Willows
Party	Candidate	Votes	%	±%
Conservative	S. Edwards*	444	58.7	
Independent	R. Montgomery	195	25.8	
Labour	J. Dougall	118	15.6	
Majority		249	32.9	
Turnout		751	48.0	
Registered electors		1,565		
Conservative hold		Swing		

=== Wetheringsett ===
Wetheringsett
Party	Candidate	Votes	%	±%
Conservative	R. Passmore	328	57.3	
Labour	M. Carr	244	42.7	
Majority		84	14.7	
Turnout		570	45.0	
Registered electors		1,267		
Conservative gain from Independent		Swing		

=== Weybread ===
Weybread
Party	Candidate	Votes	%	±%
Conservative	J. Wellingham*	427	65.3	
Labour	G. Deeks	227	34.7	
Majority		200	30.6	
Turnout		662	52.0	
Registered electors		1,273		
Conservative hold		Swing		

=== Woolpit ===
Woolpit
Party	Candidate	Votes	%	±%
Independent	R. Melvin*	462	81.9	
Liberal Democrats	B. Wilkes	102	18.1	
Majority		360	63.8	
Turnout		561	43.0	
Registered electors		1,304		
Independent hold		Swing		

=== Worlingworth ===
Worlingworth
Party	Candidate	Votes	%	±%
Conservative	K. Thurman*	446	73.7	
Labour	D. Wakeman	159	26.3	
Majority		287	47.4	
Turnout		632	51.0	
Registered electors		1,239		
Conservative hold		Swing		

== By-elections ==
=== Walsham-le-Willows ===
Walsham-le-Willows by-election: 4 February 1993
Party	Candidate	Votes	%	±%
Conservative		275	31.7	
Independent		216	24.9	
Liberal Democrats		191	22.0	
Labour		185	21.3	
Majority		59	6.8	
Turnout		867	55.4	
Registered electors		1,565		
Conservative hold		Swing		

=== Stowupland ===
Stowupland by-election: 4 February 1993
Party	Candidate	Votes	%	±%
Labour		506	45.1	
Liberal Democrats		335	29.9	
Conservative		281	25.0	
Majority		171	15.2	
Turnout		1,122	33.7	
Registered electors		3,329		
Labour gain from Conservative		Swing		

=== Debenham ===
Debenham by-election: 30 September 1993
Party	Candidate	Votes	%	±%
Liberal Democrats		454	57.3	
Conservative		338	42.7	
Majority		116	14.6	
Turnout		792	46.3	
Registered electors		1,711		
Liberal Democrats gain from Conservative		Swing		

=== Worlingworth ===
Worlingworth by-election: 20 October 1994
Party	Candidate	Votes	%	±%
Independent		225	43.5	
Liberal Democrats		170	32.9	
Labour		122	23.6	
Majority		55	10.6	
Turnout		517	41.7	
Registered electors		1,240		
Independent gain from Conservative		Swing		
