= 1983 Mid Suffolk District Council election =

1983 English local government election

- 5 May 1983

All 40 seats to Mid Suffolk District Council 21 seats needed for a majority

	First party	Second party	Third party
Party	Conservative	Independent	Labour
Seats won	19	13	6
Seat change	▲4	▼5	▲1
Popular vote	5,624	5,096	3,860
Percentage	29.9%	27.1%	20.5%
Swing	▼9.8%	▲7.8%	▼10.8%
	Fourth party	Fifth party
Party	Alliance	Ind. Conservative
Seats won	1	1
Seat change	▼1	▲1
Popular vote	3,278	Unopposed
Percentage	17.4%	Unopposed
Swing	▲7.7%	N/A
- Winner of each seat at the 1983 Mid Suffolk District Council election.
Council control before election
No overall control
Council control after election
No overall control

The 1983 Mid Suffolk District Council election took place on 5 May 1983 to elect members of Mid Suffolk District Council in Suffolk, England. This was on the same day as other local elections.

== Summary ==
=== Election result ===
1983 Mid Suffolk District Council election
Party	Candidates	Seats	Gains	Losses	Net gain/loss	Seats %	Votes %	Votes	+/−
Conservative	22	19	5	1	▲4	47.5	29.9	5,624	–9.8
Independent	19	13	1	6	▼5	32.5	27.1	5,096	+7.8
Labour	11	6	1	0	▲1	15.0	20.5	3,860	–10.8
Alliance	10	1	0	1	▼1	2.5	17.4	3,278	+7.7
Ind. Conservative	1	1	1	0	▲1	2.5	N/A	N/A	N/A
Ecology	7	0	0	0	Steady	0.0	5.1	964	N/A

== Ward results ==
Incumbent councillors standing for re-election are marked with an asterisk (*). Changes in seats do not take into account by-elections or defections.

=== Badwell Ash ===
Badwell Ash
Party	Candidate	Votes	%	±%
Independent	M. Linn*	Unopposed		
Registered electors		1,234		
Independent hold				

=== Barham ===
Barham
Party	Candidate	Votes	%	±%
Conservative	B. Shipp	453	66.4	
Alliance	B. Ward	229	33.6	
Majority		224	32.8	
Turnout		682	49.4	
Registered electors		1,381		
Conservative gain from Independent		Swing		

=== Barking ===
Barking
Party	Candidate	Votes	%	±%
Independent	P. Chapman*	526	84.0	
Independent	F. Cornish	100	16.0	
Majority		426	68.0	
Turnout		626	45.0	
Registered electors		1,391		
Independent hold		Swing		

=== Bramford ===
Bramford (2 seats)
Party	Candidate	Votes	%	±%
Conservative	C. Bird*	612	41.7	
Independent	G. Cunningham*	465	31.7	
Conservative	J. Banfield	391	26.6	
Turnout		~1,468	54.7	
Registered electors		2,684		
Conservative hold				
Independent hold				

=== Claydon ===
Claydon
Party	Candidate	Votes	%	±%
Conservative	H. Griffiths*	Unopposed		
Registered electors		1,235		
Conservative hold				

=== Creeting ===
Creeting
Party	Candidate	Votes	%	±%
Independent	J. Ward*	304	62.0	
Alliance	A. Lilley	186	38.0	
Majority		118	24.0	
Turnout		490	46.9	
Registered electors		1,045		
Independent hold		Swing		

=== Debenham ===
Debenham
Party	Candidate	Votes	%	±%
Conservative	E. Alcock	Unopposed		
Registered electors		1,361		
Conservative hold				

=== Elmswell ===
Elmswell
Party	Candidate	Votes	%	±%
Independent	D. Dyball*	408	61.4	
Alliance	G. Coleman	205	30.9	
Ecology	M. Green	51	7.7	
Majority		203	30.5	
Turnout		664	41.9	
Registered electors		1,585		
Independent hold		Swing		

=== Eye ===
Eye
Party	Candidate	Votes	%	±%
Independent	C. Flatman*	Unopposed		
Registered electors		1,393		
Independent hold				

=== Fressingfield ===
Fressingfield
Party	Candidate	Votes	%	±%
Independent	R. Marchant	290	56.1	
Alliance	R. White	227	43.9	
Majority		63	12.2	
Turnout		517	41.0	
Registered electors		1,261		
Independent gain from Conservative		Swing		

=== Gislingham ===
Gislingham
Party	Candidate	Votes	%	±%
Independent	W. Stevens*	Unopposed		
Registered electors		1,366		
Independent hold				

=== Haughley & Wetherden ===
Haughley & Wetherden
Party	Candidate	Votes	%	±%
Labour	E. Crascall*	Unopposed		
Registered electors		1,391		
Labour hold				

=== Helmingham ===
Helmingham
Party	Candidate	Votes	%	±%
Conservative	M. Denyer	325	71.7	
Independent	C. Crosby	128	28.3	
Majority		197	43.4	
Turnout		453	42.3	
Registered electors		1,071		
Conservative gain from Independent		Swing		

=== Hoxne ===
Hoxne
Party	Candidate	Votes	%	±%
Conservative	Y. Herbert	Unopposed		
Registered electors		1,285		
Conservative hold				

=== Mendlesham ===
Mendlesham
Party	Candidate	Votes	%	±%
Independent	A. Braybrooke*	465	81.6	
Ecology	F. Luis	105	18.4	
Majority		360	63.2	
Turnout		570	42.9	
Registered electors		1,329		
Independent hold		Swing		

=== Needham Market ===
Needham Market (2 seats)
Party	Candidate	Votes	%	±%
Conservative	I. Mason	Unopposed		
Conservative	J. Swain*	Unopposed		
Registered electors		2,902		
Conservative hold				
Conservative hold				

=== Norton ===
Norton
Party	Candidate	Votes	%	±%
Conservative	B. Siffleet*	408	63.1	
Ecology	J. Matthissen	239	36.9	
Majority		169	26.1	
Turnout		647	42.1	
Registered electors		1,537		
Conservative hold		Swing		

=== Onehouse ===
Onehouse
Party	Candidate	Votes	%	±%
Independent	H. Mitson*	565	85.5	
Ecology	C. Chapman	96	14.5	
Majority		469	71.0	
Turnout		661	46.4	
Registered electors		1,425		
Independent hold		Swing		

=== Palgrave ===
Palgrave
Party	Candidate	Votes	%	±%
Ind. Conservative	N. Goodin	Unopposed		
Registered electors		1,314		
Ind. Conservative gain from Independent				

=== Rattlesden ===
Rattlesden
Party	Candidate	Votes	%	±%
Conservative	R. Vansittart	356	52.5	
Alliance	D. Cole	215	31.7	
Labour	J. Dawson	107	15.8	
Majority		141	20.8	
Turnout		678	48.8	
Registered electors		1,389		
Conservative hold		Swing		

=== Rickinghall ===
Rickinghall
Party	Candidate	Votes	%	±%
Independent	R. Moss*	417	63.2	
Independent	J. Jackson	243	36.8	
Majority		174	26.4	
Turnout		660	44.7	
Registered electors		1,477		
Independent hold		Swing		

=== Ringshall ===
Ringshall
Party	Candidate	Votes	%	±%
Conservative	W. Martindale	263	50.2	
Independent	L. Manton	261	49.8	
Majority		2	0.4	
Turnout		524	38.8	
Registered electors		1,351		
Conservative gain from Independent		Swing		

=== Stonham ===
Stonham
Party	Candidate	Votes	%	±%
Conservative	H. D'Arcy*	Unopposed		
Registered electors		1,113		
Conservative hold				

=== Stowmarket Central ===
Stowmarket Central (2 seats)
Party	Candidate	Votes	%	±%
Conservative	J. Cade*	591	28.1	
Conservative	D. Perry	572	27.2	
Alliance	M. Livett	417	19.9	
Labour	F. Reed	334	15.9	
Labour	M. Weatherell	186	8.9	
Turnout		~2,100	64.5	
Registered electors		3,256		
Conservative hold				
Conservative gain from Alliance				

=== Stowmarket North ===
Stowmarket North (2 seats)
Party	Candidate	Votes	%	±%
Labour	R. Jones*	483	28.5	
Labour	E. Jones	381	22.4	
Independent	R. Pattle*	326	19.2	
Conservative	W. Crane	321	18.9	
Alliance	M. Wilson	186	11.0	
Turnout		~1,697	64.7	
Registered electors		2,623		
Labour hold				
Labour gain from Independent				

=== Stowmarket South ===
Stowmarket South (2 seats)
Party	Candidate	Votes	%	±%
Labour	E. Nunn*	661	47.3	
Labour	C. Soames*	531	38.0	
Conservative	D. Burch	394	28.2	
Alliance	J. Finch	342	24.5	
Turnout		~1,396	56.4	
Registered electors		2,475		
Labour hold				
Labour hold				

=== Stowupland ===
Stowupland (2 seats)
Party	Candidate	Votes	%	±%
Alliance	S. Wilson*	1,139	47.6	
Labour	M. Shave	923	38.6	
Ecology	R. Stearn	331	13.8	
Turnout		~2,393	81.1	
Registered electors		2,951		
Alliance hold				
Labour hold				

=== Stradbroke ===
Stradbroke
Party	Candidate	Votes	%	±%
Independent	S. Hawes*	Unopposed		
Registered electors		1,162		
Independent hold				

=== Thurston ===
Thurston
Party	Candidate	Votes	%	±%
Conservative	F. Marston	471	70.5	
Labour	J. Walters	197	29.5	
Majority		274	41.0	
Turnout		668	42.4	
Registered electors		1,575		
Conservative hold		Swing		

=== Walsham-le-Willows ===
Walsham-le-Willows
Party	Candidate	Votes	%	±%
Conservative	S. Edwards*	467	53.4	
Independent	V. Beak	243	27.8	
Alliance	R. Barber	132	15.1	
Ecology	R. Austin	33	3.8	
Majority		224	25.6	
Turnout		875	59.0	
Registered electors		1,483		
Conservative hold		Swing		

=== Wetheringsett ===
Wetheringsett
Party	Candidate	Votes	%	±%
Conservative	G. Taylor*	Unopposed		
Registered electors		1,215		
Conservative gain from Independent				

=== Weybread ===
Weybread
Party	Candidate	Votes	%	±%
Conservative	J. Wellingham	Unopposed		
Registered electors		1,192		
Conservative hold				

=== Woolpit ===
Woolpit
Party	Candidate	Votes	%	±%
Independent	R. Baker*	355	68.1	
Ecology	N. Rutter	109	20.9	
Labour	R. Morris	57	10.9	
Majority		246	47.2	
Turnout		521	48.9	
Registered electors		1,065		
Independent hold		Swing		

=== Worlingworth ===
Worlingworth
Party	Candidate	Votes	%	±%
Conservative	K. Thurman*	Unopposed		
Registered electors		1,251		
Conservative hold				

== By-elections ==
=== Stonham ===
Stonham by-election: 22 May 1986
Party	Candidate	Votes	%	±%
Conservative		278	43.2	
Alliance		269	41.8	
Labour		96	14.9	
Majority		9	1.4	
Turnout		643	56.9	
Registered electors		1,130		
Conservative hold		Swing		

=== Ringshall ===
Ringshall by-election: 30 October 1986
Party	Candidate	Votes	%	±%
Conservative		326	56.8	
Alliance		185	32.2	
Labour		63	11.0	
Majority		141	24.6	
Turnout		574	40.0	
Registered electors		1,435		
Conservative hold		Swing		
