= 1999 Mid Suffolk District Council election =

1999 English local government election

- 6 May 1999

All 40 seats to Mid Suffolk District Council 21 seats needed for a majority

	First party	Second party	Third party
Party	Conservative	Liberal Democrats	Labour
Seats won	15	14	6
Seat change	▲9	▲2	▼11
Popular vote	9,020	7,880	7,690
Percentage	33.8%	29.5%	28.8%
Swing	▲12.2%	▲2	▼14.8%
	Fourth party	Fifth party
Party	Independent	Independent Labour
Seats won	3	2
Seat change	▼2	▲2
Popular vote	1,422	698
Percentage	5.3%	2.6%
Swing	▼1.1%	N/A
- Winner of each seat at the 1999 Mid Suffolk District Council election.
Control before election
No overall control
Control after election
No overall control

The 1999 Mid Suffolk District Council election took place on 6 May 1999 to elect members of Mid Suffolk District Council in Suffolk, England. This was on the same day as other local elections.

== Summary ==
=== Election result ===
1999 Mid Suffolk District Council election
Party	Candidates	Seats	Gains	Losses	Net gain/loss	Seats %	Votes %	Votes	+/−
Conservative	28	15	9	0	▲9	37.5	33.8	9,020	+12.2
Liberal Democrats	37	14	3	1	▲2	35.0	29.5	7,880	+2.2
Labour	27	6	0	11	▼11	15.0	28.8	7,690	–14.8
Independent	4	3	0	2	▼2	7.5	5.3	1,422	–1.1
Independent Labour	2	2	2	0	▲2	5.0	2.6	698	N/A

== Ward results ==
Incumbent councillors standing for re-election are marked with an asterisk (*). Changes in seats do not take into account by-elections or defections.

=== Badwell Ash ===
Badwell Ash
Party	Candidate	Votes	%	±%
Liberal Democrats	M. Saunders	300	50.3	
Conservative	J. Storey*	296	49.7	
Majority		4	0.7	
Turnout		596	45.0	
Registered electors		1,331		
Liberal Democrats gain from Independent		Swing		

=== Barham ===
Barham
Party	Candidate	Votes	%	±%
Liberal Democrats	C. Crane	310	46.1	
Conservative	P. Ferris	235	34.9	
Labour	A. Elliot	128	19.0	
Majority		75	11.1	
Turnout		673	39.0	
Registered electors		1,706		
Liberal Democrats hold		Swing		

=== Barking ===
Barking
Party	Candidate	Votes	%	±%
Liberal Democrats	V. Hoy*	Unopposed		
Registered electors		1,552		
Liberal Democrats hold				

=== Bramford ===
Bramford (2 seats)
Party	Candidate	Votes	%	±%
Conservative	R. Saunders	384	45.5	
Labour	T. Green*	381	45.1	
Labour	C. Curl*	351	41.6	
Liberal Democrats	P. Sands	179	21.2	
Liberal Democrats	J. Truelove	145	17.2	
Turnout		~844	26.0	
Registered electors		3,247		
Conservative gain from Labour				
Labour hold				

=== Claydon ===
Claydon
Party	Candidate	Votes	%	±%
Conservative	M. Miller	302	56.7	
Labour	D. Swale	186	34.9	
Liberal Democrats	A. Flury	45	8.4	
Majority		116	21.8	
Turnout		533	34.0	
Registered electors		1,548		
Conservative gain from Labour		Swing		

=== Creeting ===
Creeting
Party	Candidate	Votes	%	±%
Liberal Democrats	A. Lilley*	311	62.1	
Conservative	G. Broatfield	190	37.9	
Majority		121	24.2	
Turnout		501	42.0	
Registered electors		1,180		
Liberal Democrats hold		Swing		

=== Debenham ===
Debenham
Party	Candidate	Votes	%	±%
Liberal Democrats	D. Sadler-Bridge	317	40.9	
Conservative	T. Passmore	304	39.2	
Labour	S. Chittenden*	154	19.9	
Majority		13	1.7	
Turnout		775	43.1	
Registered electors		1,800		
Liberal Democrats hold		Swing		

=== Elmswell ===
Elmswell
Party	Candidate	Votes	%	±%
Conservative	M. Talbot	326	38.7	
Labour	R. Durrant*	230	27.3	
Independent	P. Dow	206	24.5	
Liberal Democrats	G. Serjeant	80	9.5	
Majority		96	11.4	
Turnout		842	33.4	
Registered electors		2,522		
Conservative gain from Labour		Swing		

=== Eye ===
Eye
Party	Candidate	Votes	%	±%
Independent	C. Flatman*	333	54.6	
Labour	M. Carr	202	33.1	
Liberal Democrats	J. Faulkener	75	12.3	
Majority		131	21.5	
Turnout		610	39.6	
Registered electors		1,540		
Independent hold		Swing		

=== Fressingfield ===
Fressingfield
Party	Candidate	Votes	%	±%
Independent	G. Frost*	443	71.3	
Liberal Democrats	H. Stewart	178	28.7	
Majority		265	42.7	
Turnout		621	41.1	
Registered electors		1,511		
Independent hold		Swing		

=== Gislingham ===
Gislingham
Party	Candidate	Votes	%	±%
Labour	T. O'Keefe*	327	45.9	
Conservative	D. Kearsley	302	42.4	
Liberal Democrats	G. Clarke	83	11.7	
Majority		25	3.5	
Turnout		712	38.9	
Registered electors		1,830		
Labour hold		Swing		

=== Haughley & Wetherden ===
Haughley & Wetherden
Party	Candidate	Votes	%	±%
Labour	D. Evans*	322	51.3	
Conservative	I. Lockett	247	39.3	
Liberal Democrats	J. Grimbly	59	9.4	
Majority		75	11.9	
Turnout		628	37.6	
Registered electors		1,671		
Labour hold		Swing		

=== Helmingham ===
Helmingham
Party	Candidate	Votes	%	±%
Conservative	M. Raine*	304	66.1	
Labour	G. Tanner	86	18.7	
Liberal Democrats	M. Selwyn-Smith	70	15.2	
Majority		218	47.4	
Turnout		460	38.7	
Registered electors		1,189		
Conservative hold		Swing		

=== Hoxne ===
Hoxne
Party	Candidate	Votes	%	±%
Liberal Democrats	J. Craven*	356	53.8	
Conservative	S. Geddes	241	36.4	
Labour	E. Halton	65	9.8	
Majority		115	17.4	
Turnout		662	42.9	
Registered electors		1,544		
Liberal Democrats hold		Swing		

=== Mendlesham ===
Mendlesham
Party	Candidate	Votes	%	±%
Conservative	C. Storey	363	50.5	
Labour	J. Barker*	356	49.5	
Majority		7	1.0	
Turnout		719	42.5	
Registered electors		1,690		
Conservative gain from Labour		Swing		

=== Needham Market ===
Needham Market (2 seats)
Party	Candidate	Votes	%	±%
Liberal Democrats	W. Marchant*	881	57.3	
Liberal Democrats	M. Norris	535	34.8	
Conservative	I. Mason	377	24.5	
Labour	K. Smith	224	14.6	
Turnout		~1,483	35.0	
Registered electors		3,558		
Liberal Democrats hold				
Liberal Democrats hold				

=== Norton ===
Norton
Party	Candidate	Votes	%	±%
Conservative	B. Siffleet*	432	53.3	
Liberal Democrats	J. Ottley	378	46.7	
Majority		54	6.7	
Turnout		810	44.8	
Registered electors		1,807		
Conservative hold		Swing		

=== Onehouse ===
Onehouse
Party	Candidate	Votes	%	±%
Liberal Democrats	R. Cray*	406	65.2	
Conservative	R. Willison-Gray	217	34.8	
Majority		189	30.3	
Turnout		623	36.0	
Registered electors		1,732		
Liberal Democrats hold		Swing		

=== Palgrave ===
Palgrave
Party	Candidate	Votes	%	±%
Conservative	C. Michell*	342	56.9	
Liberal Democrats	M. Goater	149	24.8	
Labour	C. Wright	110	18.3	
Majority		193	32.1	
Turnout		601	38.4	
Registered electors		1,566		
Conservative hold		Swing		

=== Rattlesden ===
Rattlesden
Party	Candidate	Votes	%	±%
Liberal Democrats	P. Otton*	Unopposed		
Registered electors		1,538		
Liberal Democrats hold				

=== Rickinghall ===
Rickinghall
Party	Candidate	Votes	%	±%
Conservative	S. Michell	378	45.2	
Labour	T. Lodge	355	42.5	
Liberal Democrats	C. Lavin	103	12.3	
Majority		23	2.8	
Turnout		836	40.2	
Registered electors		2,080		
Conservative hold		Swing		

=== Ringshall ===
Ringshall
Party	Candidate	Votes	%	±%
Liberal Democrats	M. Turner*	Unopposed		
Registered electors		2,021		
Liberal Democrats hold				

=== Stonham ===
Stonham
Party	Candidate	Votes	%	±%
Liberal Democrats	A. Fowler*	306	61.3	
Conservative	R. Grimsey	193	38.7	
Majority		113	22.6	
Turnout		499	37.2	
Registered electors		1,340		
Liberal Democrats hold		Swing		

=== Stowmarket Central ===
Stowmarket Central (2 seats)
Party	Candidate	Votes	%	±%
Labour	M. Finbow	503	47.4	
Conservative	G. Paton	450	42.4	
Labour	R. Snell*	425	40.1	
Conservative	D. Burch	400	37.7	
Liberal Democrats	B. Fearnley	180	17.0	
Liberal Democrats	R. Townsley	155	14.6	
Turnout		~1,117	30.0	
Registered electors		3,722		
Labour hold				
Conservative gain from Labour				

=== Stowmarket North ===
Stowmarket North (2 seats)
Party	Candidate	Votes	%	±%
Independent Labour	R. Jones*	351	45.0	
Independent Labour	E. Jones*	347	44.5	
Labour	D. Macpherson	235	30.2	
Liberal Democrats	G. Cray	231	29.7	
Labour	S. Britton	220	28.3	
Liberal Democrats	A. Cooke	179	23.0	
Turnout		~762	22.0	
Registered electors		3,463		
Independent Labour gain from Labour				
Independent Labour gain from Labour				

=== Stowmarket South ===
Stowmarket South (2 seats)
Party	Candidate	Votes	%	±%
Liberal Democrats	B. McKinley	501	58.9	
Liberal Democrats	K. Scarff	418	49.2	
Labour	E. Nunn*	349	41.1	
Labour	J. Drake	263	31.0	
Turnout		~1,113	24.0	
Registered electors		3,463		
Liberal Democrats gain from Labour				
Liberal Democrats gain from Labour				

=== Stowupland ===
Stowupland (2 seats)
Party	Candidate	Votes	%	±%
Labour	M. Shave*	663	54.1	
Labour	C. Jones*	569	46.4	
Conservative	J. Clover	407	33.2	
Conservative	P. Dyble	199	16.3	
Liberal Democrats	F. Rapsey	155	12.7	
Turnout		~1,165	35.0	
Registered electors		3,329		
Labour hold				
Labour hold				

=== Stradbroke ===
Stradbroke
Party	Candidate	Votes	%	±%
Conservative	S. Gemmill*	380	73.6	
Liberal Democrats	D. Whymark	136	26.4	
Majority		244	47.3	
Turnout		516	42.5	
Registered electors		1,215		
Conservative hold		Swing		

=== Thurston ===
Thurston
Party	Candidate	Votes	%	±%
Conservative	R. Cook	444	51.9	
Labour	D. Stevenson*	332	38.8	
Liberal Democrats	B. Wilkes	80	9.3	
Majority		112	13.1	
Turnout		856	34.3	
Registered electors		2,495		
Conservative gain from Labour		Swing		

=== Walsham-le-Willows ===
Walsham-le-Willows
Party	Candidate	Votes	%	±%
Conservative	A. Russell*	375	51.0	
Labour	J. Dougall	287	39.0	
Liberal Democrats	G. Adamson	73	9.9	
Majority		88	12.0	
Turnout		735	43.3	
Registered electors		1,699		
Conservative hold		Swing		

=== Wetheringsett ===
Wetheringsett
Party	Candidate	Votes	%	±%
Conservative	R. Passmore	309	55.5	
Labour	M. Ravenhill*	242	43.4	
Majority		67	12.1	
Turnout		557	41.0	
Registered electors		1,359		
Conservative gain from Labour		Swing		

=== Weybread ===
Weybread
Party	Candidate	Votes	%	±%
Conservative	G. Mathias	335	53.9	
Liberal Democrats	D. Pye	159	25.6	
Labour	G. Deeks	125	20.1	
Majority		176	28.3	
Turnout		621	46.0	
Registered electors		1,349		
Conservative gain from Independent		Swing		

=== Woolpit ===
Woolpit
Party	Candidate	Votes	%	±%
Independent	R. Melvin*	440	79.6	
Liberal Democrats	R. Flower	109	19.7	
Majority		331	59.9	
Turnout		553	36.0	
Registered electors		1,535		
Independent hold		Swing		

=== Worlingworth ===
Worlingworth
Party	Candidate	Votes	%	±%
Conservative	J. Thurman	288	54.3	
Liberal Democrats	R. Van Slooten	238	44.9	
Majority		50	9.4	
Turnout		530	40.0	
Registered electors		1,326		
Conservative gain from Liberal Democrats		Swing		

== By-elections ==
=== Norton ===
Norton
Party	Candidate	Votes	%	±%
Conservative		546	61.4	
Liberal Democrats	John Ottley	343	38.6	
Majority		203	22.8	
Turnout		889	49.4	
Registered electors		1,800		
Conservative hold		Swing		

=== Mendlesham ===
Mendlesham
Party	Candidate	Votes	%	±%
Conservative	John Gilmour	343	48.2	
Labour		257	36.1	
Green		111	15.6	
Majority		86	12.1	
Turnout		711	41.1	
Registered electors		1,730		
Conservative hold		Swing		

=== Elmswell ===
Elmswell
Party	Candidate	Votes	%	±%
Liberal Democrats	Carol Millward	726	77.6	
Conservative		209	22.4	
Majority		517	55.3	
Turnout		935	37.0	
Registered electors		2,527		
Liberal Democrats gain from Conservative		Swing		

=== Worlingworth ===
Worlingworth
Party	Candidate	Votes	%	±%
Conservative		411	83.4	
Labour		82	16.6	
Majority		329	66.7	
Turnout		493	36.3	
Registered electors		1,358		
Conservative hold		Swing		
