= 2019 Mid Suffolk District Council election =

2019 UK local government election

- 2 May 2019

All 34 seats to Mid Suffolk District Council 18 seats needed for a majority

	First party	Second party
Party	Conservative	Green
Last election	29 seats, 51.2%	5 seats, 15.2%
Seats before	29	5
Seats won	16	12
Seat change	▼13	▲7
Popular vote	14,289	11,944
Percentage	40.7%	34.0%
Swing	▼8.0%	▲14.7%
	Third party	Fourth party
Party	Liberal Democrats	Independent
Last election	4 seats, 13.4%	2 seats, 4.0%
Seats before	4	2
Seats won	5	1
Seat change	▲1	▼1
Popular vote	6,213	1,196
Percentage	17.7%	3.4%
Swing	▲4.7%	▼0.1%
- Winner of each seat at the 2019 Mid Suffolk District Council election

The 2019 Mid Suffolk District Council election took place on 2 May 2019 to elect members of Mid Suffolk District Council in Suffolk, England. This was on the same day as other local elections.

== Summary ==
=== Election result ===
2019 Mid Suffolk District Council election
Party	Candidates	Seats	Gains	Losses	Net gain/loss	Seats %	Votes %	Votes	+/−
Conservative	32	16	N/A	N/A	▼13	47.7	40.7	14,289	–8.0
Green	21	12	N/A	N/A	▲7	35.3	34.0	11,944	+14.7
Liberal Democrats	19	5	N/A	N/A	▲1	14.7	17.7	6,213	+4.7
Independent	3	1	N/A	N/A	▼1	2.9	3.4	1,196	–0.1
Labour	8	0	N/A	N/A	Steady	0.0	3.9	1,370	–2.1
UKIP	1	0	N/A	N/A	Steady	0.0	0.3	113	–7.7

== Ward results ==
=== Bacton ===
Bacton
Party	Candidate	Votes	%
Green	Andrew Mellen	633	64.9
Conservative	Jill Wilshaw*	343	35.1
Majority		290	29.8
Turnout		976	42.4
Registered electors		2,304	
Green win (new seat)			

=== Battisford & Ringshall ===
Battisford & Ringshall
Party	Candidate	Votes	%
Green	Daniel Pratt	424	57.1
Conservative	Kay Oakes	319	42.9
Majority		105	14.2
Turnout		743	30.9
Registered electors		2,403	
Green win (new seat)			

=== Blakenham ===
Blakenham
Party	Candidate	Votes	%
Liberal Democrats	John Field*	354	51.7
Conservative	Robert Grimsey	196	28.6
Green	Peter Jousiffe	135	19.7
Majority		158	23.1
Turnout		685	27.6
Registered electors		2,487	
Liberal Democrats win (new seat)			

=== Bramford ===
Bramford
Party	Candidate	Votes	%
Conservative	James Caston*	348	57.6
Liberal Democrats	Martin Redbond	256	42.4
Majority		92	15.2
Turnout		604	30.4
Registered electors		1,989	
Conservative win (new seat)			

=== Chilton (Stowmarket) ===
Chilton (Stowmarket) (2 seats)
Party	Candidate	Votes	%
Conservative	Barry Humphreys*	552	48.1
Green	Oliver Amorowson	548	47.8
Conservative	Gary Green*	428	37.3
Liberal Democrats	David Poulson	360	31.4
Turnout		1,147	25.5
Registered electors		4,507	
Conservative win (new seat)			
Green win (new seat)			

=== Claydon & Barham ===
Claydon & Barham (2 seats)
Party	Candidate	Votes	%
Conservative	John Whitehead*	749	52.2
Conservative	Timothy Passmore*	717	50.0
Green	Helen Bridgeman	562	39.2
Liberal Democrats	Mark Valladares	427	29.8
Turnout		1,434	31.0
Registered electors		4,629	
Conservative win (new seat)			
Conservative win (new seat)			

=== Combs Ford (Stowmarket) ===
Combs Ford (Stowmarket) (2 seats)
Party	Candidate	Votes	%
Independent	Gerard Brewster*	893	61.2
Liberal Democrats	Keith Scarff	557	38.2
Conservative	Nicholas Gowrley*	443	30.4
Green	Miles Row	443	30.4
Turnout		1,458	30.5
Registered electors		4,781	
Independent win (new seat)			
Liberal Democrats win (new seat)			

=== Debenham ===
Debenham
Party	Candidate	Votes	%	±%
Conservative	Dorothy Guthrie*	605	70.1	+19.7
Labour	Terence Wilson	258	29.9	+8.2
Majority		347	40.2	+11.5
Turnout		863	35.1	–36.5
Registered electors		2,457		
Conservative hold		Swing	▲5.8	

=== Elmswell & Woolpit ===
Elmswell & Woolpit (2 seats)
Party	Candidate	Votes	%
Green	Sarah Mansel*	1,006	59.1
Green	Helen Geake	925	54.4
Conservative	Jane Storey*	719	42.2
Liberal Democrats	Kerry Burn	204	12.0
Turnout		1,702	35.0
Registered electors		4,857	
Green win (new seat)			
Green win (new seat)			

=== Eye ===
Eye
Party	Candidate	Votes	%	±%
Conservative	Peter Gould	419	53.1	N/A
Liberal Democrats	Timothy Glenton	370	46.9	N/A
Majority		49	6.2	N/A
Turnout		789	34.7	–35.3
Registered electors		2,276		
Conservative gain from Independent				

=== Fressingfield ===
Fressingfield
Party	Candidate	Votes	%	±%
Conservative	Lavinia Hadingham*	518	54.8	–5.9
Green	Peter Davies	206	21.8	N/A
Independent	Garry Deeks	141	14.9	N/A
Liberal Democrats	Paul Seeman	80	8.5	–9.9
Majority		312	33.0	–6.8
Turnout		945	39.8	–35.7
Registered electors		2,373		
Conservative hold				

=== Gislingham ===
Gislingham
Party	Candidate	Votes	%	±%
Green	Rowland Warboys	506	48.8	+11.2
Conservative	Christopher Pitt	421	40.6	–21.8
Labour	Joanne Clifford	110	10.6	N/A
Majority		85	8.2	N/A
Turnout		1,037	40.8	–33.9
Registered electors		2,540		
Green gain from Conservative		Swing	▲16.5	

=== Haughley, Stowupland & Wetherden ===
Haughley, Stowupland & Wetherden (2 seats)
Party	Candidate	Votes	%
Green	Rachel Eburne*	1,363	77.7
Green	Keith Welham*	1,277	72.8
Conservative	Stephen Britt	337	19.2
Conservative	James Passmore	293	16.7
Turnout		1,755	40.0
Registered electors		4,385	
Green win (new seat)			
Green win (new seat)			

=== Hoxne & Worlingworth ===
Hoxne & Worlingworth
Party	Candidate	Votes	%
Conservative	Matthew Hicks*	533	58.9
Green	David Penny	182	20.1
Liberal Democrats	Stephen Card	108	11.9
Labour	Anthony Scott-Robinson	82	9.1
Majority		351	38.8
Turnout		905	39.4
Registered electors		2,295	
Conservative win (new seat)			

=== Mendlesham ===
Mendlesham
Party	Candidate	Votes	%	±%
Green	Andrew Stringer*	838	72.0	+8.8
Conservative	Elaine Bryce	326	28.0	–8.8
Majority		512	44.0	+17.6
Turnout		1,164	49.2	–27.0
Registered electors		2,364		
Green hold		Swing	▲8.8	

=== Needham Market ===
Needham Market (2 seats)
Party	Candidate	Votes	%	±%
Liberal Democrats	Michael Norris*	847	62.1	+9.0
Liberal Democrats	Stephen Phillips	805	59.0	+21.6
Conservative	Matthew Oakes	442	32.4	–4.7
Conservative	Paul Allen	370	27.1	N/A
Turnout		1,364	28.2	–38.1
Registered electors		4,838		
Liberal Democrats hold				
Liberal Democrats hold				

=== Onehouse ===
Onehouse
Party	Candidate	Votes	%	±%
Green	John Matthissen*	463	55.6	–0.6
Conservative	James Spencer	245	29.4	N/A
Liberal Democrats	Nichola Willshere	125	15.0	–2.6
Majority		218	26.2	–2.7
Turnout		833	37.9	–32.9
Registered electors		2,201		
Green hold				

=== Palgrave ===
Palgrave
Party	Candidate	Votes	%	±%
Conservative	David Burn*	465	58.1	–7.0
Green	Gillian Heriz-Smith	335	41.9	+23.9
Majority		130	16.2	–30.9
Turnout		800	36.4	–38.0
Registered electors		2,199		
Conservative hold		Swing	▼15.5	

=== Rattlesden ===
Rattlesden
Party	Candidate	Votes	%	±%
Liberal Democrats	Penelope Otton*	628	63.4	+4.8
Conservative	Gillian Morgan	254	25.7	–15.7
Labour	Philip Cockell	108	10.9	N/A
Majority		374	37.7	+20.5
Turnout		990	40.4	–34.2
Registered electors		2,450		
Liberal Democrats hold		Swing	▲10.3	

=== Rickinghall ===
Rickinghall
Party	Candidate	Votes	%
Conservative	Jessica Fleming*	502	62.4
Labour	Susan Coe	302	37.6
Majority		200	24.8
Turnout		804	33.7
Registered electors		2,386	
Conservative win (new seat)			

=== St Peter’s (Stowmarket) ===
St Peter’s (Stowmarket)
Party	Candidate	Votes	%
Conservative	Paul Ekpenyong*	282	50.1
Liberal Democrats	David Child	281	49.9
Majority		1	0.2
Turnout		563	25.8
Registered electors		2,323	
Conservative win (new seat)			

=== Stonham ===
Stonham
Party	Candidate	Votes	%
Conservative	Susan Morley*	413	44.8
Green	Nicholas Hardingham	304	33.0
UKIP	Jeremy Hall	113	12.3
Liberal Democrats	David Payne	91	9.9
Majority		109	11.8
Turnout		921	39.8
Registered electors		2,325	
Conservative win (new seat)			

=== Stow Thorney (Stowmarket) ===
Stow Thorney (Stowmarket) (2 seats)
Party	Candidate	Votes	%
Conservative	David Muller*	475	50.9
Green	Terence Carter	415	44.4
Conservative	Clifton Bushe	400	42.8
Labour	William Howman	238	25.5
Turnout		934	22.0
Registered electors		4,242	
Conservative win (new seat)			
Green win (new seat)			

=== Stradbroke & Laxfield ===
Stradbroke & Laxfield
Party	Candidate	Votes	%	±%
Conservative	Julie Flatman*	616	68.2	–1.8
Liberal Democrats	Catherine Leith	287	31.8	N/A
Majority		329	36.4	–3.6
Turnout		903	38.8	–35.9
Registered electors		2,433		
Conservative hold				

=== Thurston ===
Thurston (2 seats)
Party	Candidate	Votes	%
Green	Wendy Turner	732	45.1
Conservative	Harold Richardson	633	39.0
Conservative	Oliver Passmore	498	30.7
Green	Sue Tytler	438	27.0
Liberal Democrats	Ellen Kirkby	206	12.7
Independent	Olivia Boland	162	10.0
Liberal Democrats	Francis Wright	158	9.7
Labour	Ursula Ajimal	136	8.4
Turnout		1,624	35.5
Registered electors		4,581	
Green win (new seat)			
Conservative win (new seat)			

=== Walsham-le-Willows ===
Walsham-le-Willows
Party	Candidate	Votes	%
Conservative	Richard Meyer	428	50.8
Green	Stuart Masters	209	24.8
Labour	John Dougall	136	16.2
Liberal Democrats	Martin Spurling	69	8.2
Majority		219	26.0
Turnout		842	32.9
Registered electors		2,562	
Conservative win (new seat)			

== By-elections ==
=== Thurston ===
Thurston: 17 February 2022
Party	Candidate	Votes	%	±%
Green	Austin Davies	845	64.4	+25.2
Conservative	Philippa Wilding	399	30.4	−3.5
Liberal Democrats	Timothy Glenton	37	2.8	−8.2
Labour	Terence Wilson	32	2.4	−4.8
Majority		446	34.0	
Turnout		1,320	28.1	−7.4
Green hold		Swing	▲14.4	
