= Mid Suffolk District Council elections =

Local government elections in Suffolk, England

Mid Suffolk District Council elections are held every four years to elect members of Mid Suffolk District Council in Suffolk, England. Since the last boundary changes in 2019, there have been 34 councillors elected from 26 wards.

== Council elections ==
Year	Conservative	Labour	Liberal Democrats (Note: Includes totals for the predecessors of the Liberal Democrats, the Liberal Party and SDP (both of which participated in the Alliance).)	Green	Independents & Others	Council control after election
Local government reorganisation; council established (40 seats)
1973	6	9	1	–	24	Independent
1976	13	6	2	0	19	No overall control
New ward boundaries
1979	15	5	2	0	18	No overall control
1983	19	6	1	0	14	No overall control
1987	19	6	4	0	11	No overall control
1991	17	8	10	0	5	No overall control
1995	6	17	12	0	5	No overall control
1999	15	6	14	0	5	No overall control
New ward boundaries
2003	21	2	11	2	4	Conservative
2007	22	0	10	2	6 (Note: Including 2 Suffolk Together)	Conservative
2011	22	1	6	4	7 (Note: Including 2 Suffolk Together)	Conservative
2015	29	0	4	5	2	Conservative
New ward boundaries; seats decreased from 40 to 34
2019	16	0	5	12	1	No overall control
2023	6	0	4	24	0	Green

== Results maps ==
1979 results map

1983 results map

1987 results map

1991 results map

1995 results map

1999 results map

2003 results map

2007 results map

2011 results map

2015 results map

2019 results map

2023 results map

== By-election results ==
A by-election occurs when seats become vacant between council elections. Below is a summary of by-elections from 1983 onwards. Full by-election results are listed under the last regular election preceding the by-election and can be found by clicking on the ward name.

=== 1983-1994 ===
Ward	Date	Incumbent party	Winning party
Stonham	22 May 1986	Conservative	Conservative
Ringshall	30 October 1986	Conservative	Conservative
Palgrave	19 May 1988	Conservative	Conservative
Needham Market	21 July 1988	Conservative	Conservative
Onehouse	15 September 1988	SLD	SLD
Needham Market	5 April 1990	Conservative	Liberal Democrats
Stowmarket South	5 July 1990	Labour	Labour
Walsham-le-Willows	4 February 1993	Conservative	Conservative
Stowupland	4 February 1993	Conservative	Labour
Debenham	30 September 1993	Conservative	Liberal Democrats
Worlingworth	20 October 1994	Conservative	Independent

=== 1995-2006 ===
Ward	Date	Incumbent party	Winning party
Haughley & Wetherden	13 July 1995	Labour	Labour
Stowmarket Central	2 May 1996	Labour	Labour
Badwell Ash	27 February 1997	Independent	Conservative
Norton	9 September 1999	Conservative	Conservative
Mendlesham	17 January 2002	Conservative	Conservative
Elmswell	21 March 2002	Conservative	Liberal Democrats
Worlingworth	23 January 2003	Conservative	Conservative
Claydon & Barham	21 October 2004	Liberal Democrats	Liberal Democrats
Barking & Somersham	21 October 2004	Liberal Democrats	Liberal Democrats
Hoxne	28 July 2005	Conservative	Liberal Democrats
Bramford & Blakenham	24 November 2005	Conservative	Liberal Democrats

=== 2007-2018 ===
Ward	Date	Incumbent party	Winning party
Haughley & Wetherden	25 March 2010	Conservative	Green
Stowmarket North	22 May 2014	Conservative	Conservative
Barking & Somersham	2 February 2016	Conservative	Green
Eye	4 May 2017	Independent	Conservative

=== 2019-present ===
Ward	Date	Incumbent party	Winning party
Thurston	17 February 2022	Green	Green
Chilton	2 May 2024	Green	Green
Thurston	24 September 2024	Green	Conservative
Haughley, Stowupland & Wetherden	12 June 2025	Green	Green
