= 2003 Mid Suffolk District Council election =

2003 English local government election

- 1 May 2003

All 40 seats to Mid Suffolk District Council 21 seats needed for a majority

	First party	Second party	Third party
Party	Conservative	Liberal Democrats	Independent
Seats won	21	11	5
Seat change	▲6	▼3	▲2
Popular vote	14,464	8,940	1,967
Percentage	47.0%	29.1%	6.4%
Swing	▲13.2%	▼0.4%	▲1.1%
	Fourth party	Fifth party	Sixth party
Party	Labour	Green	Independent Labour
Seats won	2	1	0
Seat change	▼4	▲1	▼2
Popular vote	4,209	1,170	did not stand
Percentage	13.7%	3.8%	did not stand
Swing	▼15.1%	N/A	▼2.6%
- Winner of each seat at the 2003 Mid Suffolk District Council election.
Control before election
No overall control
Control after election
Conservative

The 2003 Mid Suffolk District Council election took place on 1 May 2003 to elect members of Mid Suffolk District Council in Suffolk, England. This was on the same day as other local elections.

== Summary ==
=== Election result ===
2003 Mid Suffolk District Council election
Party	Candidates	Seats	Gains	Losses	Net gain/loss	Seats %	Votes %	Votes	+/−
Conservative	31	21	N/A	N/A	▲6	52.5	47.0	14,464	+13.2
Liberal Democrats	22	11	N/A	N/A	▼3	27.5	29.1	8,940	–0.4
Independent	7	5	N/A	N/A	▲2	12.5	6.4	1,967	+1.1
Labour	13	2	N/A	N/A	▼4	5.0	13.7	4,209	–15.1
Green	7	1	N/A	N/A	▲1	2.5	3.8	1,170	N/A
Independent Labour	0	0	0	2	▼2	0.0	N/A	N/A	–2.6

== Ward results ==
Incumbent councillors standing for re-election are marked with an asterisk (*). Changes in seats do not take into account by-elections or defections.

=== Bacton & Old Newton ===
Bacton & Old Newton
Party	Candidate	Votes	%
Independent	Michael Shave*	420	48.4
Conservative	David Hodges	270	31.1
Green	Roger Stearn	178	20.5
Majority		150	17.3
Turnout		868	48.2
Registered electors		1,802	
Independent win (new seat)			

=== Badwell Ash ===
Badwell Ash
Party	Candidate	Votes	%	±%
Conservative	Roy Barker	668	64.2	
Liberal Democrats	Malcolm Saunders*	373	35.8	
Majority		295	28.3	
Turnout		1,041	53.7	+8.7
Registered electors		1,938		
Conservative gain from Liberal Democrats		Swing		

=== Barking & Somersham ===
Barking & Somersham
Party	Candidate	Votes	%
Liberal Democrats	Vivienne Hoy*	Unopposed	
Registered electors		1,723	
Liberal Democrats win (new seat)			

=== Bramford & Blakenham ===
Bramford & Blakenham (2 seats)
Party	Candidate	Votes	%
Labour	Gary Install	Unopposed	
Conservative	Roger Saunders*	Unopposed	
Registered electors		3,162	
Labour win (new seat)			
Conservative win (new seat)			

=== Claydon & Barham ===
Claydon & Barham (2 seats)
Party	Candidate	Votes	%
Liberal Democrats	Clive Crane*	756	58.3
Liberal Democrats	Sally Eastall	712	54.9
Conservative	John Williams	538	41.5
Conservative	Neil Cooper	485	37.4
Turnout		~1,297	38.1
Registered electors		3,405	
Liberal Democrats win (new seat)			
Liberal Democrats win (new seat)			

=== Debenham ===
Debenham
Party	Candidate	Votes	%	±%
Conservative	Edward Alcock	386	52.7	
Liberal Democrats	Manuelo Lorenzo	221	30.2	
Green	Merlin Carr	125	17.1	
Majority		165	22.5	
Turnout		732	43.6	+0.5
Registered electors		1,680		
Conservative gain from Liberal Democrats		Swing		

=== Elmswell & Norton ===
Elmswell & Norton (2 seats)
Party	Candidate	Votes	%
Liberal Democrats	Carol Milward*	873	65.9
Liberal Democrats	Douglas Reed	850	64.1
Conservative	David Etchells-Butler	453	34.2
Turnout		~1,337	37.9
Registered electors		3,526	
Liberal Democrats win (new seat)			
Liberal Democrats win (new seat)			

=== Eye ===
Eye
Party	Candidate	Votes	%	±%
Independent	Charles Flatman*	Unopposed		
Registered electors		1,591		
Independent hold				

=== Fressingfield ===
Fressingfield
Party	Candidate	Votes	%	±%
Independent	George Frost*	454	61.5	
Independent	Garry Deeks	117	15.8	
Liberal Democrats	Mary Goode	88	11.9	
Green	Emily Beanland	79	10.7	
Majority		337	45.7	
Turnout		738	41.6	+0.5
Registered electors		1,776		
Independent hold		Swing		

=== Gislingham ===
Gislingham
Party	Candidate	Votes	%	±%
Conservative	Diana Kearsley	572	66.1	
Labour	Terence O'Keefe*	294	33.9	
Majority		278	32.1	
Turnout		866	46.5	+7.6
Registered electors		1,862		
Conservative gain from Labour		Swing		

=== Haughley & Wetherden ===
Haughley & Wetherden
Party	Candidate	Votes	%	±%
Conservative	John Davie-Thornhill	335	52.2	
Labour	David Evans*	307	47.8	
Majority		28	4.4	
Turnout		642	38.9	+2.3
Registered electors		1,660		
Conservative gain from Labour		Swing		

=== Helmingham & Coddenham ===
Helmingham & Coddenham
Party	Candidate	Votes	%
Conservative	Timothy Passmore	415	62.2
Liberal Democrats	Simon West	252	37.8
Majority		163	24.4
Turnout		667	40.5
Registered electors		1,651	
Conservative win (new seat)			

=== Hoxne ===
Hoxne
Party	Candidate	Votes	%	±%
Conservative	Christopher Lawrence	463	62.7	
Liberal Democrats	Robert Van Slooten	275	37.3	
Majority		188	25.4	
Turnout		738	46.4	+3.5
Registered electors		1,597		
Conservative gain from Liberal Democrats		Swing		

=== Mendlesham ===
Mendlesham
Party	Candidate	Votes	%	±%
Green	Andrew Stringer	472	53.4	
Conservative	John Gilmour*	412	46.6	
Majority		60	6.8	
Turnout		884	50.9	+8.4
Registered electors		1,755		
Green gain from Conservative		Swing		

=== Needham Market ===
Needham Market (2 seats)
Party	Candidate	Votes	%	±%
Liberal Democrats	Wendy Marchant*	740	53.6	
Liberal Democrats	Michael Norris*	517	37.5	
Conservative	Ian Mason	468	33.9	
Conservative	Raymond Darnell	465	33.7	
Labour	David Hill	173	12.5	
Turnout		~1,413	38.6	+3.6
Registered electors		3,662		
Liberal Democrats hold				
Liberal Democrats hold				

=== Onehouse ===
Onehouse
Party	Candidate	Votes	%	±%
Conservative	Bruce Cameron-Laker	297	42.6	
Liberal Democrats	Robert Cray*	293	42.0	
Green	John Matthissen	108	15.5	
Majority		4	0.6	
Turnout		698	41.9	−2.9
Registered electors		1,667		
Conservative gain from Liberal Democrats		Swing		

=== Palgrave ===
Palgrave
Party	Candidate	Votes	%	±%
Conservative	Charles Michell*	418	71.8	
Labour	Elaine Halton	164	28.2	
Majority		254	43.6	
Turnout		582	36.5	−1.9
Registered electors		1,614		
Conservative hold		Swing		

=== Rattlesden ===
Rattlesden
Party	Candidate	Votes	%	±%
Liberal Democrats	Penelope Otton*	488	73.4	
Independent	Lord Morris	177	26.6	
Majority		311	46.8	
Turnout		665	44.3	−5.9
Registered electors		1,510		
Liberal Democrats hold		Swing		

=== Rickinghall & Walsham ===
Rickinghall & Walsham (2 seats)
Party	Candidate	Votes	%
Conservative	Alec Russell*	812	66.5
Conservative	Sara Michell*	797	65.3
Labour	John Dougall	409	33.5
Turnout		~1,249	37.0
Registered electors		3,376	
Conservative win (new seat)			
Conservative win (new seat)			

=== Ringshall ===
Ringshall
Party	Candidate	Votes	%	±%
Liberal Democrats	Patricia Godden	340	54.3	
Conservative	Eleanor Rauh	286	45.7	
Majority		54	8.6	
Turnout		626	32.6	+32.6
Registered electors		1,928		
Liberal Democrats hold		Swing		

=== Stowmarket Central ===
Stowmarket Central (2 seats)
Party	Candidate	Votes	%	±%
Conservative	Gordon Paton*	621	54.5	
Conservative	Poppy Robinson	558	48.9	
Labour	Marilyn Finbow*	518	45.5	
Labour	Ronald Snell	428	37.6	
Turnout		~1,191	32.4	+2.4
Registered electors		3,676		
Conservative hold				
Conservative gain from Labour				

=== Stowmarket North ===
Stowmarket North (3 seats)
Party	Candidate	Votes	%	±%
Conservative	Frank Shephard	621	57.7	
Conservative	Frank Whittle	571	53.1	
Labour	Duncan Macpherson	455	42.3	
Labour	John Drake	448	41.6	
Labour	Suzanne Britton	446	41.4	
Turnout		~1,135	24.7	+2.7
Registered electors		4,594		
Conservative gain from Independent Labour				
Conservative gain from Independent Labour				
Labour win (new seat)				

=== Stowmarket South ===
Stowmarket South (2 seats)
Party	Candidate	Votes	%	±%
Liberal Democrats	Brenda McKinlay*	533	50.8	
Conservative	Vera Waspe	517	49.2	
Liberal Democrats	Keith Scarff*	504	47.9	
Conservative	Keith Myers-Hewitt	479	45.5	
Turnout		~1,069	28.7	+4.7
Registered electors		3,724		
Liberal Democrats hold				
Conservative gain from Liberal Democrats				

=== Stowupland ===
Stowupland
Party	Candidate	Votes	%	±%
Conservative	Ivan Lockett	384	66.0	
Labour	Timothy Lodge	198	34.0	
Majority		186	32.0	
Turnout		582	33.6	−1.4
Registered electors		1,755		
Conservative gain from Labour		Swing		

=== Stradbroke & Laxfield ===
Stradbroke & Laxfield
Party	Candidate	Votes	%
Independent	Stuart Gemmill*	438	66.7
Liberal Democrats	Sarah Coulter	115	17.5
Green	Adrian Green	104	15.8
Majority		323	49.2
Turnout		657	34.3
Registered electors		1,917	
Independent win (new seat)			

=== The Stonhams ===
The Stonhams
Party	Candidate	Votes	%
Liberal Democrats	Anthony Fowler*	333	45.2
Conservative	Richard Passmore*	300	40.7
Green	Nicholas Hardingham	104	14.1
Majority		33	4.5
Turnout		737	42.0
Registered electors		1,755	
Liberal Democrats win (new seat)			

=== Thurston & Hessett ===
Thurston & Hessett (2 seats)
Party	Candidate	Votes	%
Conservative	Derrick Haley	687	47.7
Conservative	Alan Stiff	639	44.4
Liberal Democrats	David Kemplay	384	26.7
Labour	Donald Stevenson	369	25.6
Turnout		~1,211	36.5
Registered electors		3,317	
Conservative win (new seat)			
Conservative win (new seat)			

=== Wetheringsett ===
Wetheringsett
Party	Candidate	Votes	%	±%
Conservative	Charles Tilbury	Unopposed		
Registered electors		1,818		
Conservative hold				

=== Woolpit ===
Woolpit
Party	Candidate	Votes	%	±%
Independent	Ramon Melvin*	361	73.1	
Liberal Democrats	Ann Cooke	133	26.9	
Majority		228	46.2	
Turnout		494	32.0	−4
Registered electors		1,545		
Independent hold		Swing		

=== Worlingworth ===
Worlingworth
Party	Candidate	Votes	%	±%
Conservative	Paul Debenham*	547	77.4	
Liberal Democrats	Denise Foster	160	22.6	
Majority		387	54.8	
Turnout		707	40.8	+0.8
Registered electors		1,739		
Conservative hold		Swing		

== By-elections ==
Barking & Somersham By-Election 21 October 2004
Party	Candidate	Votes	%	±%
Liberal Democrats	Robin Richardson	281	51.1	
Conservative		183	33.3	
UKIP		86	15.6	
Majority		98	17.8	
Turnout		550	32.1	+32.1
Liberal Democrats hold		Swing		

Claydon & Barham By-Election 21 October 2004
Party	Candidate	Votes	%	±%
Liberal Democrats	Martin Redbound	617	57.7	−0.7
Conservative		374	35.0	−6.6
Labour		78	7.3	+7.3
Majority		243	22.7	
Turnout		1,069	30.7	−7.4
Liberal Democrats hold		Swing		

Hoxne By-Election 28 July 2005
Party	Candidate	Votes	%	±%
Liberal Democrats	Evelyn Adey	308	46.9	+9.6
Conservative	Elizabeth Gibson-Harries	295	45.0	−17.7
Labour	Garry Deeks	54	8.2	+8.2
Majority		13	1.9	
Turnout		657	40.3	−6.1
Liberal Democrats gain from Conservative		Swing		

Bramford & Blakenham By-Election 24 November 2005
Party	Candidate	Votes	%	±%
Liberal Democrats	John Field	536	64.3	
Conservative	Michael Damant	229	27.5	
Labour	Suzanne Britton	68	8.2	
Majority		307	36.8	
Turnout		833	26.5	+26.5
Liberal Democrats gain from Conservative		Swing		
