= 2007 Mid Suffolk District Council election =

2007 English local government election

- 3 May 2007

All 40 seats to Mid Suffolk District Council 21 seats needed for a majority

	First party	Second party	Third party
Party	Conservative	Liberal Democrats	Independent
Seats won	22	10	4
Seat change	▲1	▼1	▼1
Popular vote	18,373	12,976	2,363
Percentage	46.9%	33.1%	6.0%
Swing	▼0.1%	▲4.0%	▼0.4%
	Fourth party	Fifth party	Sixth party
Party	Green	Suffolk Together	Labour
Seats won	2	2	0
Seat change	▲1	▲2	▼2
Popular vote	1,562	1,533	1,769
Percentage	4.0%	3.9%	4.5%
Swing	▲0.2%	N/A	▼9.2%
- Winner of each seat at the 2007 Mid Suffolk District Council election.
Control before election
Conservative
Control after election
Conservative

The 2007 Mid Suffolk District Council election took place on 3 May 2007 to elect members of Mid Suffolk District Council in Suffolk, England. This was on the same day as other local elections.

== Summary ==
=== Election result ===
2007 Mid Suffolk District Council election
Party	Candidates	Seats	Gains	Losses	Net gain/loss	Seats %	Votes %	Votes	+/−
Conservative	34	22	3	2	▲1	52.4	46.9	18,373	–0.1
Liberal Democrats	31	10	1	2	▼1	23.8	33.1	12,976	+4.0
Independent	6	4	0	1	▼1	14.3	6.0	2,363	–0.4
Green	4	2	1	0	▲1	4.8	4.0	1,562	+0.2
Suffolk Together	3	2	2	0	▲2	4.8	3.9	1,533	N/A
Labour	6	0	0	2	▼2	0.0	4.5	1,769	–9.2
UKIP	3	0	0	0	Steady	0.0	1.3	523	N/A
BNP	1	0	0	0	Steady	0.0	0.3	105	N/A

== Ward results ==
Incumbent councillors standing for re-election are marked with an asterisk (*). Changes in seats do not take into account by-elections or defections.

=== Bacton & Old Newton ===
Bacton & Old Newton
Party	Candidate	Votes	%	±%
Independent	Sarah Stringer	473	54.7	
Conservative	Terence Curran	392	45.3	
Majority		81	9.4	
Turnout		865	45.5	−2.7
Registered electors		1,902		
Independent hold		Swing		

=== Badwell Ash ===
Badwell Ash
Party	Candidate	Votes	%	±%
Conservative	Roy Barker*	782	75.3	
Liberal Democrats	Ann Gath	152	14.6	
BNP	John Jones	105	10.1	
Majority		630	60.6	
Turnout		1,039	52.2	−1.5
Registered electors		1,992		
Conservative hold		Swing		

=== Barking & Somersham ===
Barking & Somersham
Party	Candidate	Votes	%	±%
Suffolk Together	Stephen Wright	362	39.6	
Conservative	Jeremy Smith	286	31.3	
Liberal Democrats	Robin Richardson*	266	29.1	
Majority		76	8.3	
Turnout		914	52.2	+52.2
Registered electors		1,752		
Suffolk Together gain from Liberal Democrats		Swing		

=== Bramford & Blakenham ===
Bramford & Blakenham (2 seats)
Party	Candidate	Votes	%	±%
Suffolk Together	Michael Blakenham	706	51.0	
Liberal Democrats	John Field*	689	49.7	
Liberal Democrats	Niki Fowler	459	33.2	
Conservative	Linda Britt	318	23.0	
Turnout		~1,383	43.9	+43.9
Registered electors		3,153		
Suffolk Together gain from Labour				
Liberal Democrats gain from Conservative				

=== Claydon & Barham ===
Claydon & Barham (2 seats)
Party	Candidate	Votes	%	±%
Liberal Democrats	Martin Redbond*	933	64.9	
Liberal Democrats	Mohammed Touman	527	36.7	
Suffolk Together	Peter Welham	465	32.4	
Conservative	Tony Ferris	378	26.3	
Turnout		~1,437	39.7	+1.6
Registered electors		3,618		
Liberal Democrats hold				
Liberal Democrats hold				

=== Debenham ===
Debenham
Party	Candidate	Votes	%	±%
Conservative	Kathie Guthrie	486	67.7	
Liberal Democrats	Julia Truelove	232	32.3	
Majority		254	35.4	
Turnout		718	39.5	−4.1
Registered electors		1,838		
Conservative hold		Swing		

=== Elmswell & Norton ===
Elmswell & Norton (2 seats)
Party	Candidate	Votes	%	±%
Liberal Democrats	Carol Milward*	674	43.4	
Conservative	Stephen Carlton-Walker	600	38.6	
Liberal Democrats	Doug Reed*	573	36.9	
Independent	Sarah Mansel	503	32.4	
UKIP	Nina Cawthorne	167	10.8	
Turnout		~1,499	38.6	+0.9
Registered electors		3,881		
Liberal Democrats hold				
Conservative gain from Liberal Democrats				

=== Eye ===
Eye
Party	Candidate	Votes	%	±%
Independent	Charles Flatman*	Unopposed		
Registered electors		1,646		
Independent hold				

=== Fressingfield ===
Fressingfield
Party	Candidate	Votes	%	±%
Conservative	Marilyn Curran	576	66.7	
Independent	Garry Deeks	287	33.3	
Majority		289	33.5	
Turnout		863	48.2	+6.6
Registered electors		1,820		
Conservative gain from Independent		Swing		

=== Gislingham ===
Gislingham
Party	Candidate	Votes	%	±%
Conservative	Diana Kearsley*	690	78.6	
Labour	Terence O'Keefe	188	21.4	
Majority		502	57.2	
Turnout		878	44.9	−1.6
Registered electors		1,999		
Conservative hold		Swing		

=== Haughley & Wetherden ===
Haughley & Wetherden
Party	Candidate	Votes	%	±%
Conservative	Bruce Laker	354	45.1	
Liberal Democrats	Geoff Clarke	309	39.4	
Green	Jenny Overett	122	15.5	
Majority		45	5.7	
Turnout		785	46.9	+8
Registered electors		1,722		
Conservative hold		Swing		

=== Helmingham & Coddenham ===
Helmingham & Coddenham
Party	Candidate	Votes	%	±%
Conservative	Timothy Passmore*	571	72.9	
Liberal Democrats	Ian Chapman	212	27.1	
Majority		359	45.8	
Turnout		783	45.5	+5
Registered electors		1,733		
Conservative hold		Swing		

=== Hoxne ===
Hoxne
Party	Candidate	Votes	%	±%
Conservative	Elizabeth Gibson-Harries	489	57.1	
Liberal Democrats	Evelyn Adey*	368	42.9	
Majority		121	14.1	
Turnout		857	49.8	+3.4
Registered electors		1,686		
Conservative hold		Swing		

=== Mendlesham ===
Mendlesham
Party	Candidate	Votes	%	±%
Green	Andrew Stringer*	838	77.5	
Conservative	Jessica Fleming	225	20.8	
Liberal Democrats	Lesley Reed	18	1.7	
Majority		613	56.7	
Turnout		1,081	59.8	+8.9
Registered electors		1,811		
Green hold		Swing		

=== Needham Market ===
Needham Market (2 seats)
Party	Candidate	Votes	%	±%
Liberal Democrats	Wendy Marchant*	955	58.8	
Liberal Democrats	Michael Norris*	771	47.5	
Conservative	Alastair Liddell	445	27.4	
Conservative	Veronica Craggs	324	20.0	
UKIP	Ian Mason	223	13.7	
Turnout		~1,474	40.7	+2.1
Registered electors		3,623		
Liberal Democrats hold				
Liberal Democrats hold				

=== Onehouse ===
Onehouse
Party	Candidate	Votes	%	±%
Green	John Matthissen	368	40.2	
Conservative	Larry Lloyd	352	38.5	
Liberal Democrats	Nicky Turner	195	21.3	
Majority		16	1.7	
Turnout		915	51.9	+10
Registered electors		1,769		
Green gain from Conservative		Swing		

=== Palgrave ===
Palgrave
Party	Candidate	Votes	%	±%
Conservative	David Laurie	Unopposed		
Registered electors		1,774		
Conservative hold				

=== Rattlesden ===
Rattlesden
Party	Candidate	Votes	%	±%
Liberal Democrats	Penny Otton*	473	54.9	
Conservative	Robert Nodding	389	45.1	
Majority		84	9.7	
Turnout		862	52.8	+8.5
Registered electors		1,635		
Liberal Democrats hold		Swing		

=== Rickinghall & Walsham ===
Rickinghall & Walsham (2 seats)
Party	Candidate	Votes	%	±%
Conservative	Sara Michell*	918	73.6	
Conservative	Derek Osborne	878	70.4	
Labour	Eddie Dougall	329	26.4	
Labour	John Stebbing	309	24.8	
Turnout		~1,336	38.8	+1.8
Registered electors		3,441		
Conservative hold				
Conservative hold				

=== Ringshall ===
Ringshall
Party	Candidate	Votes	%	±%
Liberal Democrats	Patricia Godden*	426	51.1	
Conservative	Karen Langford	408	48.9	
Majority		18	2.2	
Turnout		834	40.0	+7.4
Registered electors		2,095		
Liberal Democrats hold		Swing		

=== Stowmarket Central ===
Stowmarket Central (2 seats)
Party	Candidate	Votes	%	±%
Conservative	Poppy Robinson*	719	57.2	
Conservative	Lesley Mayes	696	55.4	
Liberal Democrats	Avis Finbow	539	42.8	
Liberal Democrats	Colin Groundsell	501	39.8	
Turnout		~1,316	36.1	+3.7
Registered electors		3,643		
Conservative hold				
Conservative hold				

=== Stowmarket North ===
Stowmarket North (3 seats)
Party	Candidate	Votes	%	±%
Conservative	Gary Green	1,011	45.8	
Conservative	Frank Whittle*	984	44.6	
Conservative	Peter Woodley	804	36.4	
Labour	Duncan Macpherson*	609	27.6	
Liberal Democrats	John Curle	589	26.7	
Turnout		~1,773	30.3	+5.6
Registered electors		5,847		
Conservative hold				
Conservative hold				
Conservative gain from Labour				

=== Stowmarket South ===
Stowmarket South (2 seats)
Party	Candidate	Votes	%	±%
Liberal Democrats	Keith Scarff	531	38.5	
Conservative	Vera Waspe*	525	38.0	
Conservative	David Whybrow	414	29.9	
Liberal Democrats	Christopher Vecchi	333	24.1	
Labour	Gareth Snell	191	13.8	
UKIP	Chris Streatfield	133	9.6	
Turnout		~1,189	32.2	+3.5
Registered electors		3,691		
Liberal Democrats hold				
Conservative hold				

=== Stowupland ===
Stowupland
Party	Candidate	Votes	%	±%
Conservative	Caroline Byles	434	58.3	
Liberal Democrats	Pip Sands	168	22.6	
Labour	Ronald Snell	143	19.2	
Majority		266	35.7	
Turnout		745	42.0	+8.4
Registered electors		1,797		
Conservative hold		Swing		

=== Stradbroke & Laxfield ===
Stradbroke & Laxfield
Party	Candidate	Votes	%	±%
Independent	Stuart Gemmill*	651	80.6	
Liberal Democrats	Andrew Aalders-Dunthorne	157	19.4	
Majority		494	61.1	
Turnout		808	39.8	+5.5
Registered electors		2,045		
Independent hold		Swing		

=== The Stonhams ===
The Stonhams
Party	Candidate	Votes	%	±%
Liberal Democrats	Anthony Fowler*	470	55.6	
Conservative	Juliet Betts	375	44.4	
Majority		95	11.2	
Turnout		845	46.0	+4
Registered electors		1,843		
Liberal Democrats hold		Swing		

=== Thurston & Hessett ===
Thurston & Hessett (2 seats)
Party	Candidate	Votes	%	±%
Conservative	Derrick Haley*	752	57.8	
Conservative	Rodney Scott	666	51.2	
Liberal Democrats	Richard Flower	549	42.2	
Liberal Democrats	David Kemplay	478	36.7	
Turnout		~1,351	39.2	+2.7
Registered electors		3,445		
Conservative hold				
Conservative hold				

=== Wetheringsett ===
Wetheringsett
Party	Candidate	Votes	%	±%
Conservative	Charles Tilbury*	516	62.0	
Green	Brian Fearnley	234	28.1	
Liberal Democrats	Jim Grimbly	82	9.9	
Majority		282	33.9	
Turnout		832	43.1	+43.1
Registered electors		1,948		
Conservative hold		Swing		

=== Woolpit ===
Woolpit
Party	Candidate	Votes	%	±%
Independent	Ray Melvin*	449	75.1	
Liberal Democrats	Ann Cooke	149	24.9	
Majority		300	50.2	
Turnout		598	36.9	+4.9
Registered electors		1,621		
Independent hold		Swing		

=== Worlingworth ===
Worlingworth
Party	Candidate	Votes	%	±%
Conservative	Paul Debenham*	636	76.3	
Liberal Democrats	Kay Field	198	23.7	
Majority		438	52.5	
Turnout		834	44.8	+4
Registered electors		1,871		
Conservative hold		Swing		

== By-elections ==
Haughley and Wetherden By-Election 25 March 2010
Party	Candidate	Votes	%	±%
Green	Rachel Eburne	444	61.0	+45.4
Conservative	Samantha Powell	176	24.2	−20.9
Liberal Democrats	Christopher Vecchi	51	7.0	−32.4
Labour	David Hill	32	4.4	+4.4
UKIP	Christopher Streatfield	25	3.4	+3.4
Majority		268	36.8	
Turnout		728	41.6	−5.3
Green gain from Conservative		Swing	+33.2	
