= 2015 Mid Suffolk District Council election =

2015 English local government election

- 7 May 2015

All 40 seats to Mid Suffolk District Council 21 seats needed for a majority

	First party	Second party	Third party
Party	Conservative	Green	Liberal Democrats
Seats won	29	5	4
Seat change	▲7	▲1	▼2
Popular vote	33,679	13,391	8,977
Percentage	48.7%	19.3%	13.0%
Swing	▲5.9%	▲7.7%	▼8.6%
	Fourth party	Fifth party
Party	Independent	Suffolk Together
Seats won	2	0
Seat change	▼3	▼2
Popular vote	2,401	1,079
Percentage	3.5%	1.6%
Swing	▼2.1%	▼1.6%
- Winner of each seat at the 2015 Mid Suffolk District Council election.
Control before election
Conservative
Control after election
Conservative

The 2015 Mid Suffolk District Council election took place on 7 May 2015 to elect members of Mid Suffolk District Council in Suffolk, England. This was on the same day as the 2015 general election and other local elections.

== Summary ==
=== Election result ===
2015 Mid Suffolk District Council election
Party	Candidates	Seats	Gains	Losses	Net gain/loss	Seats %	Votes %	Votes	+/−
Conservative	33	29	8	1	▲7	72.5	48.7	33,679	+5.9
Green	26	5	1	0	▲1	12.5	19.3	13,391	+7.7
Liberal Democrats	18	4	0	2	▼2	10.0	13.0	8,977	–8.6
Independent	4	2	0	3	▼3	5.0	3.5	2,401	–2.1
UKIP	11	0	0	0	Steady	0.0	8.0	5,568	+4.7
Labour	8	0	0	0	▼1	0.0	6.0	4,123	–5.9
Suffolk Together	2	0	0	2	▼2	0.0	1.6	1,079	–1.6

== Ward results ==
Incumbent councillors standing for re-election are marked with an asterisk (*). Changes in seats do not take into account by-elections or defections.

=== Bacton & Old Newton ===
Bacton & Old Newton
Party	Candidate	Votes	%	±%
Conservative	Jill Wilshaw	687	50.6	+8.3
Independent	Jacob Stringer	670	49.4	N/A
Majority		17	1.2	N/A
Turnout		1,357	70.3	+20.5
Registered electors		1,952		
Conservative gain from Independent				

=== Badwell Ash ===
Badwell Ash
Party	Candidate	Votes	%	±%
Conservative	Roy Barker*	1,071	67.4	–2.6
Green	Andy Mellen	382	24.0	+7.6
Liberal Democrats	Ann Gath	137	8.6	+0.6
Majority		689	43.4	–10.1
Turnout		1,590	74.3	+22.3
Registered electors		2,156		
Conservative hold		Swing	▼5.1	

=== Barking & Somersham ===
Barking & Somersham
Party	Candidate	Votes	%	±%
Conservative	David Card	542	41.7	+8.2
Suffolk Together	Stephen Wright*	411	31.6	–21.8
UKIP	Melanie Combstock	194	14.9	N/A
Liberal Democrats	Paul Thomas	154	11.8	–1.3
Majority		131	10.1	N/A
Turnout		1,301	72.4	+20.9
Registered electors		1,810		
Conservative gain from Suffolk Together		Swing	▲15.0	

=== Bramford & Blakenham ===
Bramford & Blakenham (2 seats)
Party	Candidate	Votes	%	±%
Liberal Democrats	John Field*	885	35.8	–1.9
Conservative	Kevin Welsby	829	33.5	+4.3
Conservative	Aprille Meakin	697	28.2	N/A
Suffolk Together	Linda Scott	668	27.0	–20.2
UKIP	Neil Harrison	561	22.7	N/A
Turnout		~2,471	71.6	+23.8
Registered electors		3,449		
Liberal Democrats hold				
Conservative gain from Suffolk Together				

=== Claydon & Barham ===
Claydon & Barham (2 seats)
Party	Candidate	Votes	%	±%
Conservative	John Whitehead*	1,330	52.8	+16.9
Conservative	James Caston	1,213	48.1	+18.7
Liberal Democrats	Mo Touman	550	21.8	–9.7
Labour	Terry Wilson	515	20.4	+4.7
Green	David Penny	384	15.2	+6.5
Independent	Jennifer Wilson	158	6.3	N/A
Turnout		~2,520	69.0	+25.2
Registered electors		3,653		
Conservative hold				
Conservative gain from Liberal Democrats				

=== Debenham ===
Debenham
Party	Candidate	Votes	%	±%
Conservative	Kathie Guthrie*	679	50.4	–2.9
Labour	Bec Jasper	293	21.7	+3.3
UKIP	Roger Fouracre	157	11.6	N/A
Green	Mark Finbow	151	11.2	–7.4
Liberal Democrats	David Payne	68	5.0	–4.6
Majority		386	28.7	–6.2
Turnout		1,348	71.6	+20.3
Registered electors		1,893		
Conservative hold		Swing	▼3.1	

=== Elmswell & Norton ===
Elmswell & Norton (2 seats)
Party	Candidate	Votes	%	±%
Conservative	John Levantis	1,619	53.7	+4.5
Green	Sarah Mansel*	1,003	33.3	+0.7
Liberal Democrats	Doug Reed	908	30.1	–0.4
UKIP	Howard Jones	750	24.9	N/A
Green	Sylvie Warry	421	14.0	N/A
Turnout		~3,015	71.1	+22.8
Registered electors		4,241		
Conservative hold				
Green hold				

=== Eye ===
Eye
Party	Candidate	Votes	%	±%
Independent	Charles Flatman*	639	54.6	+5.2
Green	Simon Hooton	531	45.4	+6.7
Majority		108	9.2	–1.5
Turnout		1,170	70.0	+17.8
Registered electors		1,704		
Independent hold		Swing	▼0.8	

=== Fressingfield ===
Fressingfield
Party	Candidate	Votes	%	±%
Conservative	Lavinia Hadingham	885	60.7	+2.1
Labour	Garry Deeks	304	20.9	+2.9
Liberal Democrats	Andrew Aalders-Dunthorne	269	18.4	–5.0
Majority		581	39.8	+4.7
Turnout		1,458	75.5	+23.6
Registered electors		1,962		
Conservative hold		Swing	▼0.4	

=== Gislingham ===
Gislingham
Party	Candidate	Votes	%	±%
Conservative	Diana Kearsley*	1,006	62.4	+0.5
Green	Rowland Warboys	607	37.6	+21.2
Majority		399	24.8	–20.7
Turnout		1,613	74.7	+21.8
Registered electors		2,199		
Conservative hold		Swing	▼10.4	

=== Haughley & Wetherden ===
Haughley & Wetherden
Party	Candidate	Votes	%	±%
Green	Rachel Eburne*	Unopposed		
Registered electors		N/A		
Green hold				

=== Helmingham & Coddenham ===
Helmingham & Coddenham
Party	Candidate	Votes	%	±%
Conservative	Tim Passmore*	956	70.3	–1.0
Liberal Democrats	Martin Spurling	395	29.0	+1.0
Majority		561	41.3	–2.0
Turnout		1,351	75.6	–2.0
Registered electors		1,828		
Conservative hold		Swing	▼1.0	

=== Hoxne ===
Hoxne
Party	Candidate	Votes	%	±%
Conservative	Liz Gibson-Harries*	839	63.5	+0.3
Labour	Nicola Carr	400	30.3	+13.6
Green	Tommy Gee	65	4.9	N/A
Majority		439	33.2	–11.9
Turnout		1,304	76.5	+22.1
Registered electors		1,728		
Conservative hold		Swing	▼6.7	

=== Mendlesham* ===
Mendlesham
Party	Candidate	Votes	%	±%
Green	Andrew Stringer*	871	62.4	–10.8
Conservative	Paul Allen	508	36.4	+15.2
Majority		363	26.0	–26.4
Turnout		1,379	76.2	+19.4
Registered electors		1,831		
Green hold		Swing	▼13.0	

=== Needham Market ===
Needham Market (2 seats)
Party	Candidate	Votes	%	±%
Liberal Democrats	Wendy Marchant*	1,307	53.1	–15.4
Liberal Democrats	Mike Norris*	921	37.4	–18.3
Conservative	Kay Oakes	913	37.1	N/A
UKIP	Samantha Streatfield	470	19.1	–0.5
Green	Terence Carter	409	16.6	N/A
Turnout		~2,461	66.3	+24.2
Registered electors		3,714		
Liberal Democrats hold				
Liberal Democrats hold				

=== Onehouse ===
Onehouse*
Party	Candidate	Votes	%	±%
Green	John Matthissen*	734	54.3	–0.1
UKIP	Andrew Billinge	343	25.4	N/A
Liberal Democrats	Cunningham	230	17.0	+6.5
Majority		391	28.9	+5.2
Turnout		1,307	70.8	+16.7
Registered electors		1,911		
Green hold				

=== Palgrave ===
Palgrave
Party	Candidate	Votes	%	±%
Conservative	David Burn*	870	64.0	+6.4
Green	Sarah Guthrie	241	17.7	–5.0
Labour	Elaine Halton	226	16.6	–1.5
Majority		629	46.3	+10.6
Turnout		1,337	74.4	+25.4
Registered electors		1,829		
Conservative hold		Swing	▲5.7	

=== Rattlesden ===
Rattlesden
Party	Candidate	Votes	%	±%
Liberal Democrats	Penny Otton*	728	57.6	–5.7
Conservative	Gilly Morgan	515	40.8	+5.7
Majority		213	16.8	–11.8
Turnout		1,243	74.6	+17.3
Registered electors		1,694		
Liberal Democrats hold		Swing	▼5.7	

=== Rickinghall & Walsham ===
Rickinghall & Walsham (2 seats)
Party	Candidate	Votes	%	±%
Conservative	Derek Osborne*	1,425	53.7	–3.0
Conservative	Jessica Fleming	1,278	48.2	–6.5
Labour	Eddie Dougall	596	22.5	–5.5
Green	Dominic Tooth	421	15.9	N/A
Green	Harriet Bowes	408	15.4	N/A
Liberal Democrats	Julia Truelove	317	11.9	N/A
Turnout		~2,654	71.0	+23.1
Registered electors		3,739		
Conservative hold				
Conservative hold				

=== Ringshall ===
Ringshall
Party	Candidate	Votes	%	±%
Conservative	David Whybrow	740	48.4	–0.3
Liberal Democrats	Nicky Willshere	338	22.1	–28.8
UKIP	Mei Minns	257	16.8	N/A
Green	Patricia Aspinall	186	12.2	N/A
Majority		402	26.3	N/A
Turnout		1,521	70.1	+22.3
Registered electors		2,187		
Conservative gain from Liberal Democrats		Swing	▲14.3	

=== Stowmarket Central ===
Stowmarket Central (2 seats)
Party	Candidate	Votes	%	±%
Conservative	Lesley Mayes*	966	38.9	–6.9
Conservative	Paul Ekpenyong	865	34.9	–4.3
UKIP	Stephen Searle	607	24.5	+9.0
Labour	Suzanne Britton	505	20.4	–4.1
Green	Linda Baxter	421	17.0	–5.4
Green	Miles Row	322	13.0	N/A
Liberal Democrats	John Curle	232	9.4	–1.4
Turnout		~2,481	67.7	+23.6
Registered electors		3,664		
Conservative hold				
Conservative hold				

=== Stowmarket North ===
Stowmarket North (3 seats)
Party	Candidate	Votes	%	±%
Conservative	Gary Green*	2,292	47.5	–2.0
Conservative	Barry Humphreys	1,948	40.4	–2.1
Conservative	Dave Muller	1,705	35.3	N/A
Labour	Duncan Macpherson*	1,284	26.6	–8.6
Green	Nigel Rozier	1,145	23.7	–6.6
UKIP	Christopher Streatfield	1,132	23.5	+9.2
Green	John Betts-Davies	1,081	22.4	N/A
Turnout		~4,826	62.7	+28.1
Registered electors		7,697		
Conservative hold				
Conservative hold				
Conservative gain from Labour				

=== Stowmarket South ===
Stowmarket South (2 seats)
Party	Candidate	Votes	%	±%
Independent	Gerard Brewster*	934	39.2	+7.2
Conservative	Nick Gowrley	856	35.9	+4.7
Liberal Democrats	Keith Scarff	768	32.2	+5.4
UKIP	Stewart Minns	574	24.1	+16.9
Green	Jen Overett	352	14.8	–9.6
Turnout		~2,383	63.6	+23.4
Registered electors		3,749		
Independent hold				
Conservative hold				

=== Stowupland ===
Stowupland
Party	Candidate	Votes	%	±%
Green	Keith Welham	686	52.9	+39.6
Conservative	Jemma Lynch	583	45.0	+5.3
Majority		103	7.9	N/A
Turnout		1,269	70.1	+21.7
Registered electors		1,849		
Green gain from Conservative		Swing	▲17.2	

=== Stradbroke & Laxfield ===
Stradbroke & Laxfield
Party	Candidate	Votes	%	±%
Conservative	Julie Flatman	1,083	67.6	N/A
Green	James Hargrave	464	29.0	N/A
Majority		619	38.6	N/A
Turnout		1,547	74.7	+23.9
Registered electors		2,144		
Conservative gain from Independent				

=== The Stonhams ===
The Stonhams
Party	Candidate	Votes	%	±%
Conservative	Suzie Morley	834	58.0	+12.4
Green	Nicholas Hardingham	425	29.6	+14.7
Liberal Democrats	Kay Field	164	11.4	–18.0
Majority		409	28.4	+11.7
Turnout		1,423	78.5	+23.9
Registered electors		1,832		
Conservative hold		Swing	▼1.2	

=== Thurston & Hessett ===
Thurston & Hessett (2 seats)
Party	Candidate	Votes	%	±%
Conservative	Derrick Haley*	1,459	56.3	–4.7
Conservative	Esther Jewson	918	35.4	–8.8
Liberal Democrats	Ellen Kirkby	606	23.4	–7.0
Green	Jonathan Arnold	576	22.2	N/A
UKIP	Ryan Fiske	523	20.2	+6.4
Turnout		2,593	73.9	+27.2
Registered electors		3,510		
Conservative hold				
Conservative hold				

=== Wetheringsett ===
Wetheringsett
Party	Candidate	Votes	%	±%
Conservative	Glen Horn	825	55.4	+2.4
Green	Peter Brooke	647	43.4	+15.8
Majority		178	12.0	–13.3
Turnout		1,472	74.4	+23.9
Registered electors		2,003		
Conservative hold		Swing	▼6.7	

=== Woolpit ===
Woolpit
Party	Candidate	Votes	%	±%
Conservative	Jane Storey	743	61.2	N/A
Green	Claire Scotford	458	37.7	+13.2
Majority		285	23.5	N/A
Turnout		1,201	73.8	+22.4
Registered electors		1,645		
Conservative gain from Independent				

== By-elections ==
=== Barking & Somersham ===
Barking and Somersham By-Election 2 June 2016
Party	Candidate	Votes	%	±%
Green	Anne Marie Killett	212	34.5	+34.5
Conservative	Jemma Lynch	210	34.2	−7.5
Liberal Democrats	Mark Valladares	154	25.1	+13.2
Labour	Will Marsburg	38	6.2	+6.2
Majority		2	0.3	
Turnout		617	34.1	−38.8
Green gain from Conservative		Swing	+21.0	

=== Eye ===
Eye By-Election 4 May 2017
Party	Candidate	Votes	%	±%
Conservative	Michael Burke	438	52.3	+52.3
Green	Simon Hooton	220	26.3	−19.1
Liberal Democrats	John Blake	112	13.4	+13.4
Labour	Alex Wilson	68	8.1	+8.1
Majority		218	26.0	
Turnout		838		
Conservative gain from Independent		Swing		
