= Ron Ball =

English police commissioner

Warwickshire Police and Crime Commissioner
- In office 22 November 2012 – 11 May 2016
- Preceded by: Office created
- Succeeded by: Philip Seccombe

Personal details
- Born: August 1950 (age 76) Bordesley Green, Birmingham, Warwickshire, England
- Party: Independent
- Children: 4
- Education: University of Southampton; Hamble College of Air Training
- Profession: Airline pilot

Ronald William Ball (born August 1950) is a former Warwickshire Police and Crime Commissioner (PCC), and the first person to hold the post. At the time of his election he was the only independent PCC not to have a background in policing. After a four-decade long career in aviation as an airline pilot on both commercial and cargo flights he was elected to the newly created office of Police and Crime Commissioner on 15 November 2012. One of his first acts in the post was to endorse an alliance with a neighbouring police force aimed at pooling resources and reducing overall costs. Although his role was a non-operational one, he requested a review of a police investigation into a motoring accident that left several people injured, citing public concerns over the incident. After it emerged that police officers who held a meeting with former Conservative Chief Whip Andrew Mitchell following his involvement in the Plebgate affair had not given a proper account of their conversation, Ball became caught up in the affair after criticising the findings of the Independent Police Complaints Commission (IPCC) which recommended the officers be disciplined. Ball did not contest the 2016 election for the post, and was succeeded by Philip Seccombe of the Conservative Party.

== Early life and career in aviation ==
Ball was born in 1950 in Bordesley Green, Birmingham (then in Warwickshire), England, and educated at Birmingham's Central Grammar School. He went on to study engineering at Southampton University, helping with the construction of Spaghetti Junction during his summer breaks from study. He trained at the Hamble College of Air Training then joined British European Airways as an airline pilot. He spent 31 years with BEA, and its successor, British Airways, rising to the position of Captain, and helping to design motivational courses for newly promoted Captains. He was also a union official with the British Airline Pilots' Association. He retired from BA in 2005, but returned to the airline industry as a pilot with Global Supply Systems in 2007, flying Boeing 747 cargo aircraft. Away from this profession he served as a local magistrate and school governor in Warwickshire. He retired from aviation in 2012 to stand as a Police Commissioner.

== Election to office ==
Ball stood as an independent candidate in Warwickshire in the United Kingdom's first elections for Police and Crime Commissioners on 15 November 2012, deciding to seek election because he believed the post should be non-political. Although he had no previous police experience, part of his campaign was to argue that this would enable him to take an independent approach to matters of law enforcement. His manifesto promised a "common sense" approach to policing, and in his election statement he said that his objective would be to reduce crime and disorder in Warwickshire. Along with his fellow Warwickshire candidates Ball expressed concerns about the limited information provided by the UK government to explain the nature and purpose of the elections. He also criticised comments made by the former Chief Constable of Warwickshire, Peter Joslin who urged voters to boycott the elections, calling them "irresponsible".

The Warwickshire turnout for the election was 15.65%, reflecting a poor figure nationally across England and Wales, and the Electoral Commission launched an investigation into why voting had been so low. The poll was conducted under the supplementary voting system in which voters choose a first and second preference, and saw him score 898 fewer votes than the Labour Party candidate and former government minister, James Plaskitt, but falling short of the 50% required for an overall majority. The second-preference votes for those who had voted for the third-place candidate, the Conservative Party's Fraser Pithie were then counted, giving Ball a clear majority. He had expected to secure around 20% of the vote. His election made him the Police and Crime Commissioner of England's smallest police force.

Warwickshire Police and Crime Commissioner election, 2012
Party	Candidate	1st round		2nd round			1st round votesTransfer votes, 2nd round
Party	Candidate	Total	Of round	Transfers	Total	Of round	1st round votesTransfer votes, 2nd round
Independent	Ron Ball	21,410	33.30%	11,821	33,231		
Labour	James Plaskitt	22,308	34.70%	2,892	25,200		
Conservative	Fraser Pithie	20,571	32.00%				
Turnout		64,289	15.23%				
Rejected ballots		1,796	2.72%				
Total votes		66,085	15.65				
Registered electors		422,189					
Independent win							

== Police and Crime Commissioner ==
As one of twelve independent candidates elected to the role of Police and Crime Commissioner across England and Wales, Ball was the only one not to have had a background in policing, either as a serving officer or member of a Police Authority. After being declared the winner on 16 November Ball was immediately sworn into office, and officially took up the role of PCC on 22 November, when the post of Police and Crime Commissioner replaced that of the Police Authorities. Keen to establish himself in the mind's eye of the public as a separate entity from the police force he set up his headquarters in a local authority owned building rather than one belonging to the Warwickshire Constabulary: “If people want to come and make a complaint against the police, it’s a bit intimidating in a police station. It will be my job to monitor all aspects of the performance of the police—and that includes being independent when it comes to dealing with people who have complaints against the police.”

The task of Police and Crime Commissioner required him to liaise with Warwickshire's Chief Constable to set budgets and meet targets. One of his first acts as the county's head of policing was to launch a six-month review of bureaucracy within the Warwickshire force. He also announced plans to improve the quality of local policing throughout the county, which he described as "patchy", and recruit more special constables. In January 2013 he said these would be recruited in "significant numbers" throughout the area. The BBC reported in August 2013 that talks were under way on proposals to merge the Warwickshire and West Midlands forces. Ball said that although this was one of several options being discussed going forward, nothing would happen during his term in office, and he personally had an "emotional preference" for smaller police forces.

On 28 November, and together with his counterpart, Bill Longmore from the neighbouring West Mercia Police, Ball gave his backing to an alliance between the two forces, enabling them to pool services and make budgetary savings of £30.3 million. A draft report published in January 2013 and titled the Police and Crime Plan indicated that as part of the savings the two police forces would collectively lose 200 frontline police officers by 2016, together with 450 civilian posts.

On 5 December Ball appointed the former Chief Executive of Warwickshire Police Authority, Dr. Eric Wood as his Deputy. He also announced that official meetings between himself and the Chief Constable would be open to the public, giving Warwickshire residents the opportunity to gain some insight into the working of their police force. Meetings would be held on a bimonthly basis with the public invited to submit questions beforehand, as well as regular surgeries at locations throughout the county.

Another of Ball's early decisions was to ask the Chief Constable to review a Warwickshire Police investigation into an incident in which several people were injured when a vehicle crashed through pedestrians and into a shop in Stratford-upon-Avon. Nobody was prosecuted over the incident in April 2012 because there was found to be insufficient evidence to bring a case, and although operational matters are generally not the responsibility of a Police and Crime Commissioner, Ball asked for the review as he felt the event was a matter for public concern.

In October 2015 Ball announced that he would not be standing for re-election in 2016. The second police and crime commissioner elections, held on 5 May 2016, saw Conservative Party councillor Philip Seccombe elected to succeed Ball with 43,208 votes, and on a turnout of 26.73%. Ball offered Seccombe his congratulations: "I have no doubt that he will find the job as rewarding and enjoyable as I have and I wish him the very best for the next four years."

== Plebgate investigation ==
The Plebgate affair concerns an altercation between former Conservative Chief Whip Andrew Mitchell and police officers guarding Downing Street that occurred on 19 September 2012, during which Mitchell was alleged to have called the officers "fucking plebs" when they refused to let him cycle through the main gate. Mitchell—the MP for Sutton Coldfield in the West Midlands—subsequently met with three Police Federation representatives from the West Midlands, Warwickshire and West Mercia forces at his constituency office to discuss the incident, after which the officers gave interviews about what had been discussed at the meeting. They claimed Mitchell had not given a full account of the disagreement, but a transcript of a recording of the meeting made by Mitchell indicated he had spoken at length about the incident. West Mercia Police launched an investigation into the affair, but concluded the three officers concerned should not be disciplined. An inquiry was also held by the Independent Police Complaints Commission (IPCC).

On 15 October 2013, the IPCC said that West Mercia's conclusions were wrong, and questioned the "honesty and integrity" of the three officers. Along with the three police forces involved, Ron Ball criticised the IPCC's findings, prompting its Deputy Chair, Deborah Glass, to respond with clarification of its conclusions. In a letter to Ball, Glass said that West Mercia had changed its mind over whether to discipline the officers before the final publication of its report. Her comments led to media speculation that senior police officers could have interfered with the investigation. Ball subsequently requested a review of West Mercia's inquiry. "That is a very serious allegation and I want to understand the exact circumstances of the investigative approval process." West Mercia then launched an investigation into issues raised by the IPCC. The IPCC subsequently announced it would conduct its own investigation into the behaviour of the three officers, prompting Ball to issue a statement on 3 November 2013 in which he expressed concerns about the legality of a fresh probe.

Ball made an appearance on the BBC's Newsnight on 16 October 2013, in which he spoke about the affair. Writing for The Independent, the journalist Steve Richards noted that he "appeared comically out of his depth".
