= West Mercia Police and Crime Commissioner =

- Incumbent; John Campion since 12 May 2016
- Police and crime commissioner of West Mercia Police
- Reports to: West Mercia Police and Crime Panel
- Appointer: Electorate of Herefordshire, Worcestershire and Shropshire
- Term length: Four years
- Constituting instrument: Police Reform and Social Responsibility Act 2011, s 1(1)
- Precursor: West Mercia Police Authority
- Inaugural holder: Bill Longmore
- Formation: 22 November 2012
- Deputy: Deputy Police and Crime Commissioner
- Salary: £78,400
- Website: www.westmercia-pcc.gov.uk

The West Mercia Police and Crime Commissioner is the police and crime commissioner (PCC), an elected official tasked with setting out the way crime is tackled by West Mercia Police in the English counties of Herefordshire, Worcestershire and Shropshire. The post was created in November 2012, following an election held on 15 November 2012, and replaced the West Mercia Police Authority. The current incumbent is John Campion, who represents the Conservative Party.

== List of West Mercia Police and Crime Commissioners ==
Name	Political party	From	To
Bill Longmore	Independent	22 November 2012	11 May 2016
John Campion	Conservative	12 May 2016	Incumbent

== Bill Longmore (2012–2016) ==
The inaugural PCC was the politically independent Bill Longmore, who was elected in November 2012.

One of Longmore's first acts as PCC was to give his backing to an alliance with the neighbouring Warwickshire Police Force enabling them to pool services and make budgetary savings of £30.3 million. A draft report published in January 2013 and titled the Police and Crime Plan indicated that as part of the savings the two police forces would collectively lose 200 frontline police officers by 2016, as well as 450 civilian posts, with West Mercia bearing most of the losses.

Longmore attracted controversy in December 2012 after appointing his former campaign manager, Barrie Sheldon, to the post of deputy PCC, despite advice to the contrary from Worcestershire County Council's Police and Crime Commission Panel, which felt there should be more competition for the position. Longmore and Sheldon had both served as officers with Staffordshire Police, but had not known each other until the 2012 election campaign. Longmore's decision, which he described as "absolutely necessary" led to allegations of cronyism, and prompted the council's Labour group to call for his resignation, with a threat to put forward a motion of no confidence against him at a Council meeting on 17 January 2013. The motion was subsequently rejected by a majority of 49–4.

In response, Longmore said that he had given Sheldon the job on the merit of his experience as a former police officer and university lecturer rather than through any favouritism. Following the rejection of the no confidence vote Longmore said that he would put forward a proposal that future PCC candidates name the person they intend to select as their deputy as part of their campaign for office.

== John Campion (2016–present) ==
On 7 July 2016, newly elected PCC John Campion appointed Tracey Onslow, a fellow Conservative councillor, to the post of Deputy Police and Crime Commissioner.

In 2017, Campion put forward proposals to transfer control of Shropshire Fire and Rescue Service and Hereford and Worcester Fire and Rescue Service to the office of the West Mercia Police and Crime Commissioner, a move Campion argued would save £4 million. The plans subsequently garnered the support of Home Secretary Amber Rudd, who gave them the go-ahead in March 2018. Both fire services subsequently launched a legal challenge, applying for a judicial review of the plans, which was rejected by the High Court in July 2018.

In October 2018, Campion announced an end to the strategic alliance his predecessor had formed with Warwickshire Police to help pool costs, and which had attracted national acclaim. Campion's decision drew criticism from the Warwickshire Police and Crime Commissioner, Philip Seccombe.

Campion's first term in office also saw the addition of an extra 400 police officers to the West Mercia force.

Campion was re-elected in 2021. Following the announcement that Anthony Bangham would be retiring as Chief Constable of West Mercia Police in September 2021, it was announced on 30 June that Campion had chosen Pippa Mills, the Deputy Chief Constable of Essex Police, as his preferred candidate to succeed Bangham. Mills' appointment was confirmed on 13 July, making her the first woman to lead West Mercia. On 27 July Campion announced plans to appoint a deputy police and crime commissioner for West Mercia Police.

Campion was re-elected for a third term in 2024.
