= Warwickshire Police Authority =

- Successor: Warwickshire Police and Crime Commissioner
- Formation: 1995
- Dissolved: November 22, 2012; 13 years ago
- Type: Police authority
- Headquarters: Northgate Street; Warwick; CV34 4SP
- Region served: Warwickshire, England
- Chair: Phil Robson
- Website: www.warwickshirepa.gov.uk

The Warwickshire Police Authority was the police authority of Warwickshire in England. Created in 1995, it held the Chief Constable of the Warwickshire Police Force to account and set the budget for the force.

The Authority departed from the traditional police authority structure and, since 2007, operated within a governance framework designed to work more closely with the force. Under the framework, there were three main work streams: Policing Communities, Resources, and Investigation & Strategic Planning. Each of these work streams was closely aligned to the main work areas of the police force and gave responsibility to the Authority to govern the way the force carried out its business, but it did not have any influence over the operational side of its work, which remained solely with the Chief Constable.

Members of the Police Authority, along with representatives from county, district, borough, town, and parish councils, and the Police Force, annually consulted with the public at 33 community forums across Warwickshire. It also had accounts on Facebook, Twitter, and YouTube.

In January 2011, it was revealed that the Authority was in discussion with the neighbouring West Mercia Police Authority, with a view to having their two police forces enter into a strategic alliance to meet anticipated cuts, though merging the two services completely was ruled out.

== Structure ==
The WPA was made up of 17 members: 9 nominated by Warwickshire County Council and 8 independent members directly appointed (at least one of whom was a serving magistrate). Since 25 May 2011, the authority's chairman was Phil Robson, an independent member who retired in 2001 as Warwickshire’s Chief Probation Officer. The previous chairman was Ian Francis. The authority also had a representative on the Police Force's 'Executive Board'.

== Audit ==
The authority's work was reviewed by the Audit Commission, who in 2010 described the Authority as "performing adequately and… contributing to improved policing in the county".

== Abolishment ==
In 2012, the Warwickshire Police Authority was abolished as part of a nationwide reform to replace police authorities in England and Wales with directly elected Police and Crime Commissioners (PCCs). This change was introduced under the Police Reform and Social Responsibility Act 2011, with the aim of increasing accountability and giving the public a greater say in policing priorities. The first election for Warwickshire’s Police and Crime Commissioner took place in November 2012, with the newly elected PCC assuming responsibility for overseeing Warwickshire Police, managing budgets, and setting strategic priorities, functions previously held by the Police Authority.
