= Plebgate =

Political scandal regarding Conservative MP Andrew Mitchell

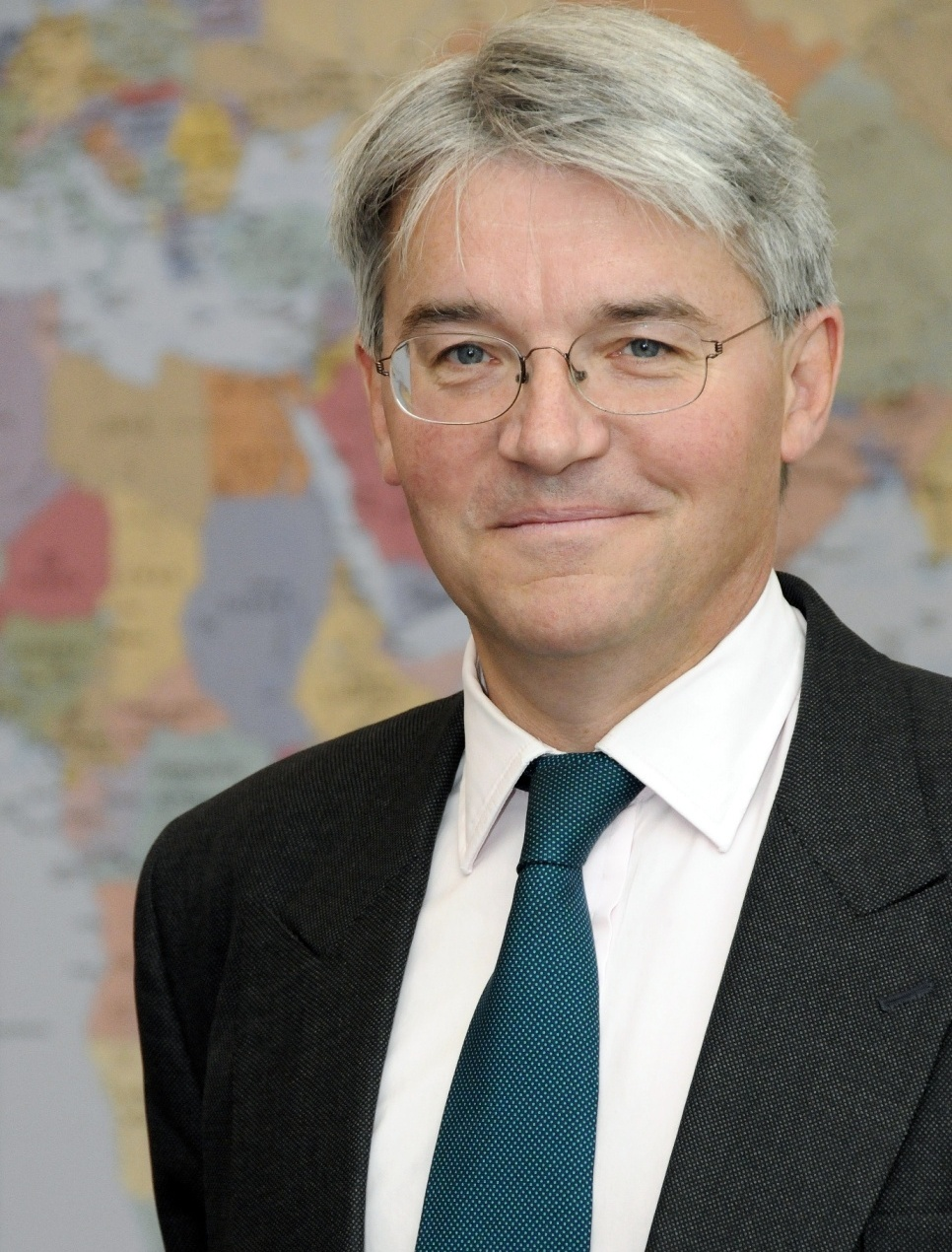
Andrew Mitchell, member of parliament for Sutton Coldfield, who was involved in the scandal

"Plebgate" (also known as "Plodgate" and "Gategate") was a British political scandal which started in September 2012. The trigger was an altercation between Conservative MP and Chief Whip Andrew Mitchell and police officers on duty outside Downing Street in London. Leaked police logs, later apparently backed up by eyewitness evidence, suggested that Mitchell had sworn at police officers and called them "plebs" (a pejorative word meaning someone of low social class) when they refused to open the main gate for him as he attempted to leave with his bicycle, telling him to walk through the adjacent pedestrian gate instead. Mitchell apologised, stating that he had used bad language but denied using the words claimed and in particular calling police officers "plebs". However, finding his position untenable amid intense media scrutiny, he resigned from the post of Chief Whip a month later.

The story returned to the headlines a few months later when CCTV footage threw into doubt the police version of events. Further, evidence originally included an email from a member of the public confirming the police's story. It was revealed this email was actually sent by a serving police officer who had not been present at the scene. The Metropolitan Police investigated the incident as Operation Alice.

The affair was revisited again in October 2013, after a report from the Independent Police Complaints Commission (IPCC) concluded that three officers had given a false account of a meeting they had with Mitchell at his constituency office in October 2012, and that the findings of a subsequent investigation had been changed just in time to recommend no disciplinary action be taken against them. After Home Secretary Theresa May and Prime Minister David Cameron criticised the conduct of the officers involved, the officers issued a statement in which they apologised for misleading the public. At the Old Bailey, PC Keith Wallis subsequently admitted falsely claiming to have witnessed the incident. He was sentenced to 12 months in prison.

Once the criminal trials had concluded, Mitchell sued The Sun for libel and lost. The judge ruled on the balance of probabilities that Mitchell had said "the words alleged or something so close to them as to amount to the same including the politically toxic word pleb."

== Incident and initial aftermath ==
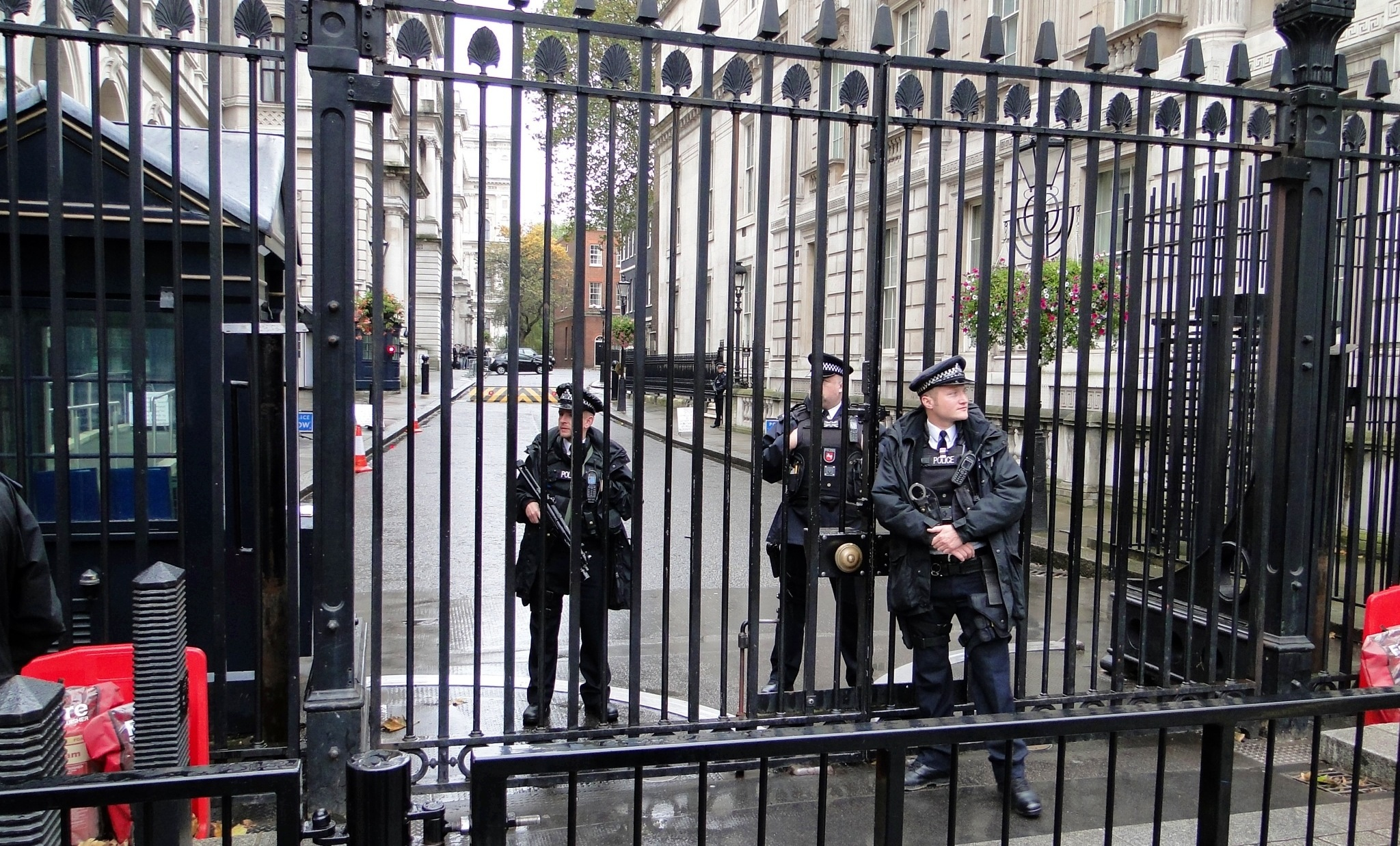
Armed police at the gates to Downing Street

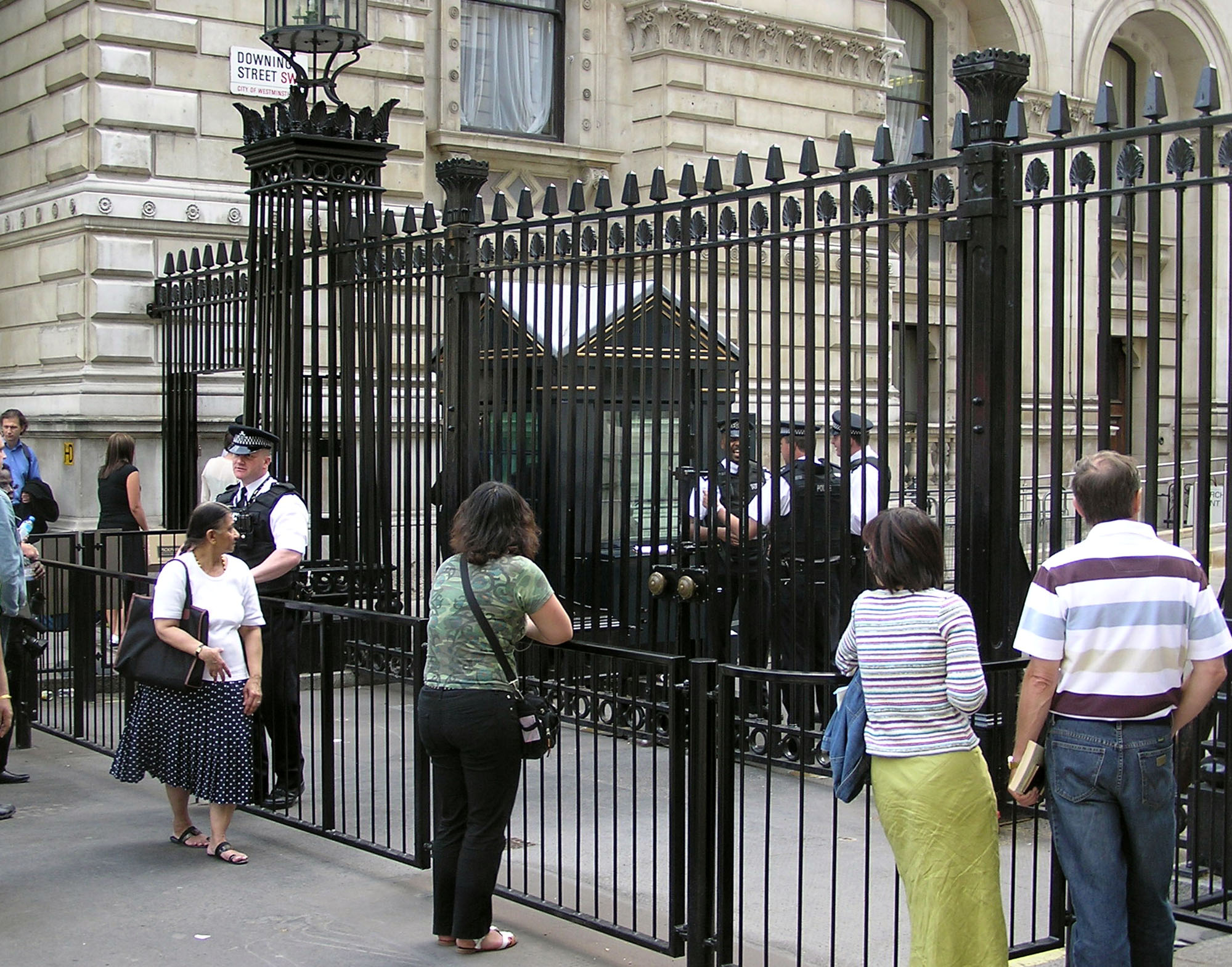
Pedestrian gate to the left, car gates at centre

On the evening of Wednesday 19 September 2012, at about 7:30 pm, Mitchell left the office of the Chief Whip at 9 Downing Street, the street containing the official residence of the Prime Minister (Number Ten) and Chancellor of the Exchequer (Number 11), which is under heavy security and has been gated since the 1980s. Mitchell, who was cycling, swore when a police officer told him to exit through the pedestrian gate rather than by the main gate. The official police log of the incident states that Mitchell said:

Best you learn your fucking place. You don't run this fucking government ... You're fucking plebs.

The log reported Mitchell as saying:

you haven't heard the last of this.

On Thursday 20 September, before the incident was publicly reported, an email was also received by John Randall, MP, the Government's Deputy Chief Whip. It appeared to offer independent corroboration of the version of events in the police log. The author stated that he was a member of the public who had been present outside the gates of Downing Street at the time, with his nephew from Hong Kong; and that the incident had been witnessed by other tourists nearby. This email later proved to be false, and in fact came from a police officer who had not been present.

These allegations became known in the media as "Plebgate". Members of the West Midlands branch of the Police Federation of England and Wales, Shadow Home Secretary Yvette Cooper and a leader column in The Daily Telegraph called on Mitchell to resign or be sacked.

The affair has occasionally been referred to as "Plodgate" ("plod" being British slang for a police officer). The Week magazine called it "Gategate", which was picked up by BBC News and Business Insider, with the latter saying that this use of the -gate suffix for scandals had taken "the practice to its logical conclusion" as a "new height of absurdity".

== Apologies and eventual resignation ==
Mitchell apologised on 21 September, saying "I admit I did not treat the police with the respect they deserve", but he denied swearing or calling the officers "plebs". However, he later admitted to saying "I thought you guys were supposed to fucking help us." John Tully, chairman of the Metropolitan Police Federation, said that Mitchell's account was contradicted by notes made by two officers at the scene. The Chairman of the Police Federation of England and Wales commented that "It is hard to fathom how someone who holds the police in such contempt could be allowed to hold a public office. Mr Mitchell's half-hearted apology for the comments made whilst leaving Downing Street will do little to build bridges with the police".

Five days following the event, on 24 September, Mitchell apologised a second time for his behaviour, saying "I didn't show the police the amount of respect which I should have done", but stated that he did not use the words that had been attributed to him. He did not specify which words he was referring to. John Tully said "It is not the words, police officers are quite thick skinned, what infuriates me here is that a minister [Andrew Mitchell] is saying police officers are liars. There is a clear difference of opinion, and we need to establish what happened." The same day, Cabinet Secretary Sir Jeremy Heywood confirmed in a letter to Shadow Home Secretary Yvette Cooper that there would be no inquiry into Mitchell's outburst because, although the outburst was "disappointing", the officer had accepted Mitchell's apology.

Mitchell's apologies failed to end the criticism, and media commentators and political opponents continued to call for his resignation. Mitchell resigned on 19 October, stating, "It has become clear to me that whatever the rights and wrongs of the matter I will not be able to fulfill my duties as we both would wish. [...] Nor is it fair to continue to put my family and colleagues through this upsetting and damaging publicity". He continued to maintain that he had not used the word "pleb". The Police Federation of England and Wales issued a statement that it regarded his resignation as the end of the matter, and would seek no further action.

== Doubts over police version of events ==
In mid-December 2012, CCTV footage of the incident was released, which Mitchell insisted backed up his version of events. The footage shows a brief interaction between Mitchell and the police but no crowd of tourists outside the gates.

On 18 December 2012, journalist Michael Crick and former The Cook Report producer Philip Braund identified the author of the 20 September email as a police officer and challenged his account. The officer admitted that he had not been present and that the email was false. Police logs and the supporting email had both claimed that "several members of the public" were present, that they had heard the exchange and were "visibly shocked". The email alleged that "Other people/tourists standing with us were also shocked and some were even, inadvertently, filming the incident". However, the CCTV footage shows only a single member of the public stopping to look on from an otherwise empty section of street immediately outside the gates.

It further transpired that Police Federation officers from around the West Midlands who met with Mitchell had claimed that he refused to give his side of events, a claim thrown into question by a recording of that meeting. Mitchell—the MP for Sutton Coldfield in the West Midlands—had met with three representatives from the West Midlands, Warwickshire and West Mercia forces at his constituency office on 12 October to discuss the incident, after which the officers gave interviews about what had been discussed at the meeting. They claimed that Mitchell had not given a full account of the disagreement, but a transcript of the recording he made indicated he had spoken at length about the incident.

== Operation Alice ==
Following these revelations, calls were made for the events to be fully investigated. The Metropolitan Police revealed that the investigation, which had started shortly after the leak of the police log, now had a team of thirty officers investigating the allegations. The operation, "Operation Alice", was led by the head of the Metropolitan Police's Directorate of Professional Standards, Deputy Assistant Commissioner Pat Gallan. On 23 December, the Metropolitan Police Commissioner Bernard Hogan-Howe returned from his holiday to promise "a ruthless search for the truth" of the affair.

It was reported on 24 March 2013 that ten police officers and one civilian were suspected of involvement. Seven of those officers and the one civilian fell under Operation Alice, with the investigation into the three Police Federation officers, Ken Mackaill, Chris Jones and Stuart Hinton, being a separate investigation by the Independent Police Complaints Commission.

The police submitted their report to the Crown Prosecution Service on 28 March. It contained evidence of alleged leaks, but not that officers had lied about what Mitchell said. The CPS indicated that it was unhappy with the file, referring to it as "initial papers" and saying that they were awaiting the conclusion of the investigation. At the same time, Mitchell started libel proceedings against The Sun, the paper that broke the story. On 31 March, as a result of the apparent leaking of the report, he lodged a complaint with the IPCC, accusing the police of a continued campaign to destroy his career. Keith Vaz, chairman of the Commons Home Affairs committee, said that this illustrated why his committee had always called for the investigation to be run by the IPCC rather than by the police themselves.

By April 2013, Operation Alice had cost an estimated £144,000.

On 5 September 2014, it was reported that the investigation's conclusion revealed the police had obtained the mobile phone records of the Political Editor of The Sun without his knowledge, through use of the Regulation of Investigatory Powers Act 2000, and in breach of the usual safeguards for the protection of journalistic sources. They were thereby able to unmask the identity of the whistle-blower. The whistle-blower alleged that one of the officers said "right, we can stitch him up".

=== Investigations and arrests ===
In March 2013, three officers from the Parliamentary and Diplomatic Protection group were arrested: one on suspicion of misconduct in a public office, one on suspicion of unauthorised disclosure of information to the media and one on suspicion of both offences. Another man, a relative of one of the arrested officers, was arrested on suspicion of "intentionally encouraging or assisting the commission of an indictable offence", relating to misconduct in a public office. In addition, another four members of the Diplomatic Protection Group became the subject of disciplinary investigations. Under a separate but related inquiry by the IPCC, three members of the Police Federation were investigated for alleged misconduct over comments they made to the media.

In June 2013 two more arrests were made, with one of those arrested being a serving police officer. The officer, one of the four Diplomatic Protection officers already undergoing a disciplinary investigation, was arrested on suspicion of misconduct in a public office and the civilian on suspicion of assisting an offender. In September 2013 it was revealed eight people had been bailed over the issue, including five police officers. The lengthy investigation was criticised by the former Director of Public Prosecutions, Ken Macdonald.

=== Criminal conviction of PC Keith Wallis ===
On 10 January 2014, Police Constable Keith Wallis pleaded guilty at the Central Criminal Court, the Old Bailey, to a charge of misconduct in a public office relating to the email he had sent to John Randall MP. This prompted the Metropolitan Police Commissioner, Sir Bernard Hogan-Howe, to issue a public apology to Andrew Mitchell:

The evidence against PC Wallis was such that he pleaded guilty. To lie about witnessing something and provide a false account falls way below the standards that I and his colleagues expect of officers. His actions have also negatively impacted upon public trust and confidence in the integrity of police officers. I would also like to apologise to Mr Mitchell that a Met officer clearly lied about seeing him behaving in a certain manner. I will be writing to him offering to meet and apologise in person. I expect my officers to serve the public without fear or favour. Where officers break the law they must expect to be held to account and answer for what they have done.

On 6 February 2014, Wallis was sentenced to twelve months imprisonment.

=== Seven findings of police misconduct ===
Seven police officers were found to have committed misconduct in relation to Plebgate, one criminally, three at the level of gross misconduct and three more as misconduct but not gross misconduct requiring dismissal from the service. Specifically:

- on 26 February 2014 PC Keith Wallis was dismissed for his criminal conduct in this matter and undisclosed business interests;
- on 26 February 2014 PC James Glanville was also dismissed for gross misconduct in data handling;
- on 30 April 2014 PC Gillian Weatherley was also dismissed for gross misconduct for leaks to the press;
- on 21 May 2014 PC Susan Johnson was dismissed for gross misconduct "in relation to honesty and integrity; confidentiality; discreditable conduct and challenging and reporting improper conduct";
- on 23 May an allegation against PC James Addison was found "not proven" by a disciplinary panel;
- three further officers were found guilty of lower level misconduct.

=== Federation officers ===
The IPCC investigation of the three Federation officers, Chris Jones, Stuart Hinton and Ken MacKaill, was on hold for much of 2014, pending a judicial review. However, on 3 November 2014, this application was unsuccessful, with the three forces' investigations branded by the administrative court "a car crash" and so legally flawed that they were "invalid and of no effect".

Two of these officers were also accused of lying to Parliament in their evidence to the Home Affairs Select Committee in the account they gave of their disciplinary record (stating they had no record when in fact they did), and were recalled by the committee to justify this. They subsequently apologised.

== IPCC conclusions ==
West Mercia Police launched an investigation into the conduct of the three police officers who spoke with Mitchell at his constituency office, but concluded they should not be disciplined. On 15 October 2013, the IPCC criticised three Police Federation Officers for their version of events. The Home Secretary, Theresa May, was also critical, saying the police were wrong to say they had no case to answer and calling for the officers to be disciplined. At Prime Minister's Questions on 16 October 2013, David Cameron said that Mitchell was "owed an apology" over the Plebgate affair.

The findings of the IPCC report were criticised by the three police forces concerned, as well as by the Police and crime commissioner for Warwickshire, Ron Ball. This prompted the IPCC's Deputy Chair, Deborah Glass, to respond with clarification of its conclusions. In a letter to Ball, Glass said that West Mercia had changed its mind over whether to discipline the officers before the final publication of its report. Her comments led to media speculation that senior police officers could have interfered with the investigation. Ball subsequently requested a review of West Mercia's inquiry. "That is a very serious allegation and I want to understand the exact circumstances of the investigative approval process." West Mercia then launched an investigation into issues raised by the IPCC.

On 21 October 2013, the three officers concerned—Ken MacKaill, Stuart Hinton, and Chris Jones—issued a statement in which they apologised for their "poor judgement" in briefing the media about their meeting, and said that they did not intend to mislead the public. Along with their respective Chief Constables, the three officers appeared before the Home Affairs Select Committee on 23 October in which they told MPs their account of the meeting with Mitchell had been "accurate" and they stood by it. The Committee subsequently called them back, believing that they had misled it. In November 2013 the IPCC announced it would conduct its own investigation into the behaviour of the officers. In the wake of the announcement, Ron Ball expressed his concerns about the legality of a new investigation.

Home Secretary Theresa May referred to this event, along with others, in a speech on 21 May 2014 which demanded the police address issues of honesty and integrity and that the Federation reform.

== Libel trial ==
On 17 November 2014 a civil libel case for the allegations began oral hearings at the Royal Courts of Justice, before Mr Justice Mitting. In these proceedings two cases were joined: the alleged libel of Mitchell by The Sun, and, alternatively, the alleged libel of PC Rowland by Mitchell. One of the alleged incidents, which had occurred in November 2005, involved Mitchell claiming that he was too important to stop for a police officer, and a direct insult addressed to the officer involved.

On 27 November Mr Justice Mitting found: "I am satisfied at least on the balance of probabilities that Mr Mitchell did speak the words alleged or something so close to them as to amount to the same including the politically toxic word pleb." In consequence Mitchell lost the libel cases and became liable for both the Sun's and PC Rowland's costs.
