= Warwickshire Police and Crime Commissioner =

- Incumbent; Philip Seccombe since 12 May 2016
- Police and crime commissioner of Warwickshire Police
- Reports to: Warwickshire Police and Crime Panel
- Appointer: Electorate of Warwickshire
- Term length: Four years
- Constituting instrument: Police Reform and Social Responsibility Act 2011
- Precursor: Warwickshire Police Authority
- Inaugural holder: Ron Ball
- Formation: 22 November 2012
- Salary: £68,200
- Website: www.warwickshire-pcc.gov.uk

The Warwickshire Police and Crime Commissioner is the police and crime commissioner, an elected official tasked with setting out the way crime is tackled by Warwickshire Police in the English County of Warwickshire. The post was created in November 2012, following an election held on 15 November 2012, and replaced the Warwickshire Police Authority. The current incumbent is Philip Seccombe, who represents the Conservative Party.

== List of Warwickshire Police and Crime Commissioners ==
Name	Political party	From	To
Ron Ball	Independent	22 November 2012	11 May 2016
Philip Seccombe	Conservative	12 May 2016	Incumbent

== Electoral history ==
Philip Seccombe was elected Warwickshire Police and Crime commissioner Election in 2024 with a majority of 306, reduced from 40,195 from 2021.

Warwickshire Police and Crime Commissioner election, 2021
Party	Candidate	1st round		2nd round			1st round votesTransfer votes, 2nd round
Party	Candidate	Total	Of round	Transfers	Total	Of round	1st round votesTransfer votes, 2nd round
Conservative	Philip Seccombe	85,963	52.07%				
Labour	Ben Twomey	45,768	27.72%				
Liberal Democrats	Louis Adam	26,660	16.15%				
Reform	Henry Lu	6,692	4.05%				
Turnout		170,182	38.45				
Rejected ballots		5075					
Total votes		165,107					
Registered electors							
Conservative hold							

Warwickshire Police and Crime Commissioner election, 2016
Party	Candidate	1st round		2nd round			1st round votesTransfer votes, 2nd round
Party	Candidate	Total	Of round	Transfers	Total	Of round	1st round votesTransfer votes, 2nd round
Conservative	Philip Seccombe	33,895	31.17%	9,313	43,208		
Labour	Julie Jackson	27,725	25.50%	7,383	35,108		
UKIP	Rob Harris	14,553	13.38%				
Independent	Dave Whitehouse	11,983	11.02%				
Liberal Democrats	Nicola Davies	11,509	10.58%				
Independent	Ben Twomey	9,076	8.35%				
Turnout		108,741	26.73%				
Rejected ballots		3,145					
Total votes		111,900					
Registered electors		418,686					
Conservative gain from Independent							

Warwickshire Police and Crime Commissioner election, 2012
Party	Candidate	1st round		2nd round			1st round votesTransfer votes, 2nd round
Party	Candidate	Total	Of round	Transfers	Total	Of round	1st round votesTransfer votes, 2nd round
Independent	Ron Ball	21,410	33.30%	11,821	33,231		
Labour	James Plaskitt	22,308	34.70%	2,892	25,200		
Conservative	Fraser Pithie	20,571	32.00%				
Turnout		64,289	15.23%				
Rejected ballots		1,796	2.72%				
Total votes		66,085	15.65				
Registered electors		422,189					
Independent win							
