= Denis Tunnicliffe, Baron Tunnicliffe =

British politician

The Right Honourable The Lord Tunnicliffe CBE
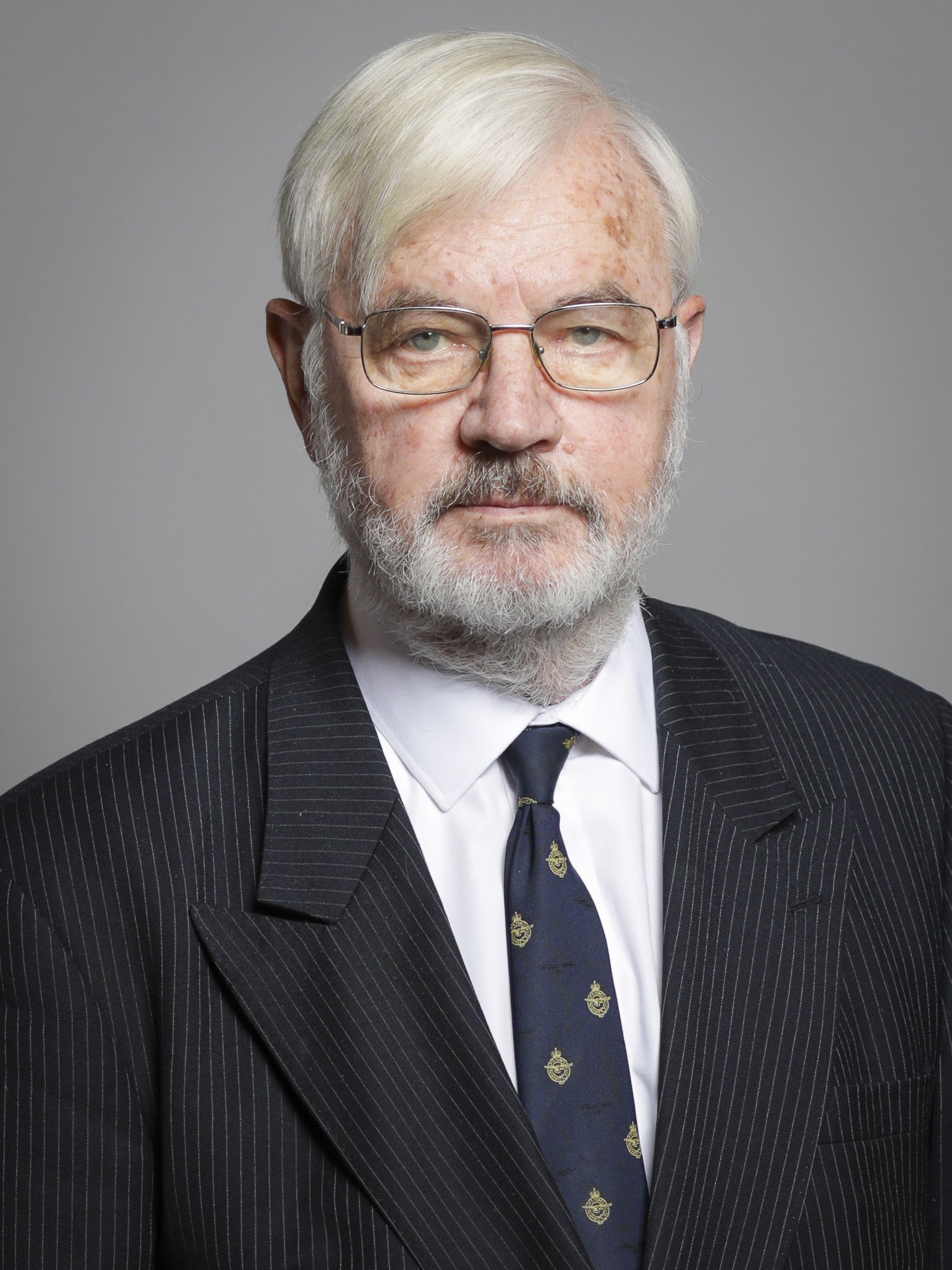
- Official portrait, 2019

Opposition Deputy Chief Whip in House of Lords
- In office 8 October 2010 – July 2024
- Leader: Ed Miliband; Harriet Harman; Jeremy Corbyn; Keir Starmer
- Succeeded by: The Earl of Courtown

Lord-in-Waiting Government Whip
- In office 6 October 2008 – 6 May 2010
- Prime Minister: Gordon Brown
- Preceded by: The Lord Bassam of Brighton
- Succeeded by: The Earl Attlee

Member of the House of Lords
- Lord Temporal
- Life peerage 2 June 2004

Personal details
- Born: 17 January 1943 (age 83)
- Party: Labour
- Spouse: Susan Dale
- Children: 2
- Education: University College London; Hamble College of Air Training
- Profession: Pilot and railwayman

Denis Tunnicliffe, Baron Tunnicliffe (born 17 January 1943) is a British politician and transport executive. He is a Labour life peer, who has had held several roles in the House of Lords ranging from a government whip to defence spokesman. He recently spent several years as the shadow deputy chief whip; when Labour returned to office after the 2024 United Kingdom general election, the incoming Starmer ministry allotted the deputy chief whip's position, Captain of the Yeomen of the Guard, to Margaret Wheeler, Baroness Wheeler.

== Early life and career ==
The son of Arthur and Ellen Tunnicliffe, he was educated at Henry Cavendish School in Derby and University College, London, where he graduated with a Bachelor of Science degree in mathematics in 1965. He was further educated at the College of Air Training in Hamble and worked then for British Overseas Airways Corporation (BOAC) and later British Airways from 1966 to 1986. Until 1972, he was a co-pilot.

Since 1968, he has been married to Susan Dale. They had two sons, one now deceased. One of his sons, Richard Tunnicliffe, was a candidate in a Caerphilly by-election for the Senedd, following the suicide of sitting Senedd Member, Hefin David. He came in third place.

From 1986 to 1988, Tunnicliffe was chief executive of the Aviation Division of International Leisure Group. For London Underground, he was managing director between 1988 and 1998 and chairman between 1998 and 2000. Tunnicliffe was chief executive of London Regional Transport from 1998 to 2000 and chairman of the United Kingdom Atomic Energy Authority from 2002 to 2004. Since 2003, he has been chairman of the Rail Safety and Standards Board. For the British Airline Pilots' Association, he was a member between 1966 and 1972, and local council member from 1969 to 1972.

Tunnicliffe is a trustee of Homerton College, Cambridge, and a council member of Royal Holloway, University of London.

In the 1993 Birthday Honours, he was appointed a Commander of the Order of the British Empire (CBE).

== In parliament ==
He was created a life peer as Baron Tunnicliffe, of Bracknell in the County of Berkshire on 2 June 2004.

Since his introduction to the House of Lords, he has served in many positions, including as a lord in waiting for the last two years of the Labour government under Gordon Brown.

Following the 2010 general election, Tunnicliffe was appointed as Opposition Deputy Chief Whip under Lord Bassam of Brighton while briefly serving as the Opposition spokesman for Defence. He continued to serve as Deputy Chief Whip as well as a general spokesman for a range of issues, as is the custom for whips in the House of Lords.

Coat of arms of Denis Tunnicliffe, Baron Tunnicliffe
Adopted 2006 Coronet Coronet of a Baron Crest A Cat sejant Sable winged Or Escutcheon Or an Orle enclosing a Saltire and a Cross all conjoined Sable and each conjoinment surmounting an Annulet Gules Supporters On either side a Mole statant erect Sable in the mouth a Black-eyed Susan Or eyed Sable slipped and leaved Gules Motto LOVE SUPPORT DIRECT Badge An Isosceles Triangle Or fimbriated Sable the base bendwise issuing from the apex an Isosceles Triangle Or fimbriated Sable the base bendwise sinister Symbolism The Arms allude to the London Underground, Lord Tunnicliffe being Managing Director of the same for ten years. The mole Supporters are a further allusion to London underground and the flower is a pun on his wife's name of Susan. The Badge is derived from BOAC's speedbird device.

Orders of precedence in the United Kingdom
Preceded by The Lord Drayson	Gentlemen; Baron Tunnicliffe	Followed by The Lord Howard of Rising
