= Circo de Bakuza =

Canadian production company

- Founded: 2009 in Montreal, Quebec, Canada
- Founders: Vincent Drolet;
- Headquarters: , Montreal, Canada
- Website: www.circodebakuza.com

Circo de Bakuza is a Canadian production company located in Montreal, Quebec, with a satellite office in Paris, France. As of 2016 its most prominent production is the entire set of pre-game shows and opening and closing ceremonies for France's Euro 2016 soccer tournament.

== Background ==
Circo de Bakuza was founded in 2009 by Vincent Drolet. The name Circo de Bakuza was a Montreal street show previously created by the founder of the agency, and a reference to the bacchanalian culture. The company's first gig was for the 5th Dubai International Film Festival. The company initially focused on galas and product launches, but rapidly produced soccer-related events as well.

== Major Performances ==
- 2014 UEFA Champions League Final opening ceremonies
- 2015 UEFA Champions League Final opening ceremonies
- 2016 UEFA Champions League Final opening ceremonies
- Euro 2016 opening ceremonies
- Euro 2016 pre-game shows
- Euro 2016 closing ceremonies
- 2016 Montreal Olympics 40th Anniversary of the 1976 Summer Olympics anniversary ceremonies

== Awards ==
- 2015 EUBEA Best Sport Event; for Berlin Opening Ceremonies of Euro 2016
