= Pat Gallan =

British police officer (born 1965)

Patricia Ferguson Gallan QPM (born 26 October 1965) is a British former police officer who served as Assistant Commissioner Specialist Crime and Operations of the Metropolitan Police in London. She previously served as Deputy Assistant Commissioner (Specialist Operations – Security and Protection) from 2012 to 2015, Assistant Chief Constable (Operations Support) of Merseyside Police from February 2006 to 2012, and also served as temporary Deputy Chief Constable of the force from October 2009 to February 2010. She was the most senior female ethnic minority police officer in British history. She retired from the police service in August 2018.

== Police career ==
Gallan was born in Paisley, Renfrewshire, and adopted by a Church of Scotland Minister, the Reverend Alex Gallan, and his wife Sarah in Lanarkshire, Scotland, and joined the Metropolitan Police as a constable in 1987. She served in the East End of London, first as a uniformed officer and then with the Criminal Investigation Department (CID).

In 1997, she trained as a hostage negotiator. She is also a qualified barrister. In March 2000, as a Detective Superintendent, she was appointed head of the informant unit in the Criminal Intelligence Branch (SO11) at Scotland Yard. She then served as staff officer to Deputy Commissioner Sir Ian Blair. In January 2005, she joined the National Crime Squad as Assistant Chief Constable in charge of covert policing and served there until her appointment to Merseyside in 2006.

Gallan later became head of the Metropolitan Police's Directorate of Professional Standards and was in charge of Operation Alice, an investigation to look into allegations relating to the "Plebgate" affair.

== Honours ==
- Gallan was awarded the Queen's Police Medal (QPM) in the 2006 New Year Honours.

Ribbon	Description	Notes
	Queen's Police Medal (QPM)	2006 New Year Honours
	Queen Elizabeth II Golden Jubilee Medal	2002; UK version of this medal
	Queen Elizabeth II Diamond Jubilee Medal	2012; UK version of this medal
	Police Long Service and Good Conduct Medal	

== Views ==
Gallan maintains that high social inequality causes crime and that tackling inequality would help tackle crime. She told The Guardian that “children are not born bad” and wants to address inequalities that lead to people feeling, “they do not have a stake in society”. She also said, “If we don’t invest at the beginning we’ll have to invest in it in terms of criminal justice and in the prison system.” and said, “I think that is not good for society, for social cohesion, but also it is not good if people do not feel they have the stake in society. We have to look at and ask ourselves individually and collectively: why do people feel they do not have a stake in society? Because once you are involved in crime and once you go into the criminal justice system, it starts to get far more difficult for you, whether it is staying out of prison or getting a job.” Gallan also maintains austerity has affected policing because police numbers have been reduced and higher demand puts the police force under strain.

== Portrayal on television ==
Gallan was played by Sara Powell in ITV's 2017 drama Little Boy Blue, which is based on the murder of Rhys Jones.
