= James Plaskitt =

British Labour Party politician (born 1954)

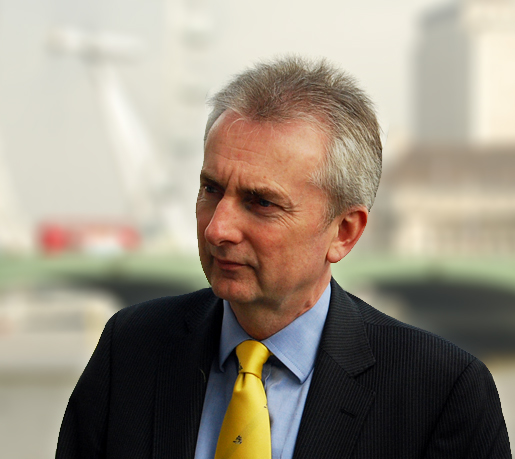
- Plaskitt in 2008

Parliamentary Under-Secretary of State for Work and Pensions
- In office 10 May 2005 – 6 October 2008
- Prime Minister: Tony Blair; Gordon Brown
- Preceded by: Chris Pond
- Succeeded by: Kitty Ussher

Member of Parliament for Warwick and Leamington
- In office 1 May 1997 – 12 April 2010
- Preceded by: Dudley Smith
- Succeeded by: Chris White

Personal details
- Born: 23 June 1954 (age 72) Grimsby
- Party: Labour
- Education: University College, Oxford

James Andrew Plaskitt (born 23 June 1954) is a British Labour Party politician who was the member of parliament (MP) for Warwick and Leamington from 1997 until his defeat at the 2010 general election.

== Early life ==
Born in Grimsby, Plaskitt was educated at the Pilgrim School (then a grammar school that became a comprehensive upper school in 1974 and closed down and now has the Pilgrims Pre-Preparatory School on the former site and council offices) on Brickhill Drive in Brickhill, Bedford and went up to University College, Oxford to read PPE and gained an MA. He graduated in 1976 and subsequently took a MPhil in Politics before taking up a lectureship at University College until 1979. He moved to Brunel University for four years as a lecturer in Government and then to Christ Church, Oxford from 1984 to 1986 as a lecturer. From 1985 he was a business analyst for Oxford Analytica, joining as a business consultant and later becoming consultancy director.

== Parliamentary career ==
His political career began in 1985 when he was elected to Oxfordshire County Council. He was leader of the Labour group from 1990 to 1996. In the 1992 general election he contested Witney for Labour, losing by a substantial margin to the then Conservative Foreign Secretary Douglas Hurd. As Labour were swept to power in the 1997 general election landslide, Plaskitt was elected MP for the previously Conservative constituency of Warwick and Leamington, beating the incumbent Dudley Smith into second place. He served on the House of Commons Treasury Select Committee from 1999, and in the 2001 general election was re-elected with an increased margin, although on a lower turnout. He is a strong supporter of reforming the law on assisted dying, tackling child poverty and expanding further education. He spoke out against Israel's actions in Gaza and called for urgent reform of international banking regulation. Plaskitt tended to vote with the government on major issues such as university tuition fees and foundation hospitals. He made clear that he would only ever support increases in university tuition fees which were matched by increases in Government grants for less well-off students, and he played a leading role in supporting Warwick Hospital's application for Trust status. He is notable among Labour MPs in that he did not vote for the 2003 invasion of Iraq.

Following the general election in May 2005, Plaskitt was appointed as a junior minister in the Department for Work and Pensions. He left the Gordon Brown Government by mutual agreement in October 2008, and was re-appointed to the House of Commons Treasury Select Committee in July 2009. Plaskitt was one of 98 MPs who voted against the provisions of the Freedom of Information Act concerning MPs' addresses applying to Members of Parliament.

Plaskitt lost to the Conservative candidate, Chris White in the 2010 general election by 3,513 votes, a swing to the Conservatives of 8.2%. The Warwick and Leamington constituency saw a very high 71% turnout.

== Other work ==
Since leaving Parliament, he has co-written The Pigeon House, published in 2011.

Plaskitt's face was used as the model for the character of Colonel George Blake in the 2001 computer game Operation Flashpoint: Cold War Crisis.

In 2012 Plaskitt was selected as the Labour candidate for the Police and Crime Commissioner election for the Warwickshire Police. In the election on 15 November 2012 he came runner-up to Ron Ball the Independent candidate.

Parliament of the United Kingdom
Preceded by Dudley Smith	Member of Parliament for Warwick and Leamington; 1997–2010	Succeeded by Chris White
