= Red shirts scandal =

Australian political scandal

The red shirts scandal was an Australian political scandal involving the Andrews Government of Victoria, Australia. The issue stemmed from the use of electorate staff during the 2014 Victorian state election, with investigations by police ending in 2019 with findings that no criminal actions occurred.

The scandal originated following a report by the Herald Sun that the Australian Labor Party had arranged for electorate officers for Victorian MPs to wear political attire ('red shirts') and campaign for the party in marginal seats during the 2014 Victorian state election. Although electorate officers are a type of political staffer, taxpayer funded electorate officers are not allowed to campaign under Victorian parliamentary rules.

Electorate officers were paid for their campaigning partly through party funds, and partly through the taxpayer funded electorate officer budget. However, many were not required to perform any parliamentary staffer work; only performing campaign-related work. Some staffers involved questioned the legality of the scheme, but their concerns were ignored.

Greens leader Greg Barber successfully introduced a motion in the Victorian Legislative Council for ombudsman Deborah Glass to investigate. The ombudsman report identified $388,000 in taxpayer money had been used in the scheme with 21 Labor MPs involved in the breach of rules. The ombudsman report resulted in an investigation by the Victorian Police's fraud squad and in August 2018, 17 former field organisers were arrested by Victoria Police during the investigation.

The issue concluded after the police and Ombudsman investigations found no criminal charges should be laid. The Ombudsman report suggest Labor repay the money, and the party did so. The following year Victoria Police announced that the investigation would be closed without the laying of charges. The opposition leader Michael O'Brien called for the Victorian OPP to make public the legal advice resulting in their decision not to prosecute but was ignored. The ombudsman later criticised the decision to arrest the staffers.

In November 2018 the Andrews Government was re-elected with a landslide 10 seat increase to their majority, and again in the 2022 election adding 1 additional seat. Andrews retired as both Premier and the Member of Mulgrave in September 2023. Labor retained the seat with Eden Foster winning the 2023 Mulgrave state by-election.
