= Deputy Foreign Secretary =

Member of the Cabinet of the United Kingdom

United Kingdom Deputy Secretary of State for Foreign, Commonwealth and Development Affairs
- Royal Arms of His Majesty's Government
- Foreign, Commonwealth and Development Office
- Type: Minister of the Crown
- Status: Secretary of State
- Member of: Cabinet; Privy Council; National Security Council
- Reports to: The Prime Minister; Foreign Secretary
- Nominator: The Prime Minister
- Appointer: The Monarch; (on the advice of the Prime Minister)
- Term length: At His Majesty's pleasure
- Formation: 12 April 2024
- First holder: Andrew Mitchell
- Final holder: Andrew Mitchell
- Abolished: 5 July 2024
- Website: Deputy Foreign Secretary

The Deputy Secretary of State for Foreign, Commonwealth and Development Affairs, also known as the Deputy Foreign Secretary, was a minister of state position in the Government of the United Kingdom deputised to the Foreign Secretary and whose responsibility was to deputise for and represent the Foreign Secretary in the House of Commons. Despite being previously used unofficially, it was officially created for Andrew Mitchell in 2023, who was the only formal holder of the office.

== History ==
In 1947, the Labour government of Clement Attlee appointed Frank Pakenham, a member of the House of Lords, to the unofficial title of Deputy Foreign Secretary (while holding the formal title of Chancellor of the Duchy of Lancaster), with responsibility for the British-occupied zones in post-war Germany.

In 1960, Edward Heath was appointed Lord Privy Seal by prime minister Harold MacMillan with Foreign Office responsibilities, alongside Foreign Secretary the Earl of Home.

In the years following, senior Foreign Office ministers were often considered as de facto deputy to the Foreign Secretary, and occasionally granted the right to attend Cabinet, but without formally or informally holding the title of Deputy Foreign Secretary - for example, Sayeeda Warsi during the Cameron–Clegg coalition (who held the title Senior Minister of State for Foreign and Commonwealth Affairs).

In November 2023, former Prime Minister David Cameron was appointed Foreign Secretary and a life peer in the House of Lords as part of the November 2023 British cabinet reshuffle by Prime Minister Rishi Sunak, with Andrew Mitchell, a Minister of State in the Foreign Office, nominated to act as Cameron's representative in the House of Commons and granted the right to attend cabinet.

Following criticism that Cameron, as a member of the House of Lords, could not be scrutinised in the House of Commons to the same extent as other ministers, Mitchell was formally given the title of Deputy Foreign Secretary during an April 2024 mini-reshuffle, the first time the post had been officially granted, while continuing to deputise for Cameron in the House of Commons and attend cabinet, as he had since Cameron's appointment.

Following the 2024 general election, the post of Foreign Secretary reverted to being held by a member of the House of Commons in the Starmer ministry, leaving the formal post of Deputy Foreign Secretary vacant.

== List of Deputy Foreign Secretaries ==
Deputy foreign secretaries
Deputy Foreign Secretary	Term of office		Other ministerial portfolios held during tenure	Party	Ministry
Frank Pakenham; 7th Earl of Longford	17 April 1947	31 May 1948	Chancellor of the Duchy of Lancaster	Labour	Attlee
Edward Heath; MP for Bexley	14 February 1960	20 October 1963	Lord Keeper of the Privy Seal	Conservative	Macmillan II
Andrew Mitchell; MP for Sutton Coldfield	12 April 2024	5 July 2024	Minister of State for Development and Africa	Conservative	Sunak
