= John Campion (politician) =

English politician

West Mercia Police and Crime Commissioner
- Incumbent
- Assumed office 12 May 2016
- Preceded by: Bill Longmore

Personal details
- Party: Conservative

John-Paul Campion (born 1976) is an English politician and the current Police and Crime Commissioner for the West Mercia region, representing the Conservative Party. He was elected to the post in 2016. Prior to his election as Police and Crime Commissioner, Campion worked for HM Prison Service as a contractors escort, and served as leader of Wyre Forest District Council.

== Career ==
As well as a career in business, Campion worked for HM Prison Service as a contractors escort in high security prisons. He was first elected as a councillor to Wyre Forest District Council in 2004, and in 2007 was appointed as its leader, becoming the youngest person to hold that office, as well as the longest. In 2005 he was elected to Worcestershire County Council, and served as a member of its Cabinet.

He was elected to the post of Police and Crime Commissioner on 5 May 2016, succeeding the previous incumbent, Bill Longmore.

In March 2021, Campion announced that he would stand as the Conservative candidate for West Mercia Police in that year's police and crime commissioner elections, which had been delayed for a year due to the COVID-19 pandemic. His campaign included plans to get more police officers on the streets, and giving them a much more visible presence. He was re-elected on 6 May, and announced he would also use his second term to press ahead with plans to transfer responsibility for fire services to the PCC. He was sworn in for his second term in office on 18 May.

Campion was re-elected for a third term in office in May 2024.

In addition to his police commissioner role, Campion is Deputy Leader of the Association of Police and Crime Commissioners Portfolio Group on Equality, Diversity and Human Rights, and Deputy Leader for Citizens in Policing.
