= Confrérie des Chevaliers du Tastevin =

Fraternity of wine connoisseurs

- Arms of the Chevaliers du Tastevin, depicting a 16c cartoon priest-chevalier
- Founded: 1934; 92 years ago Nuits-Saint-Georges, France
- Type: Bacchanalian fraternity
- Affiliation: Independent
- Status: Active
- Scope: International
- Colors: Crimson and Gold
- Publication: Tastevin en Main
- Chapters: 75
- Members: 12,000 active
- Former name: Ordre de la Boisson
- Headquarters: 2 rue de Chaux; Nuits-Saint-Georges 21700; France
- Website: tastevin-bourgogne.com

The Confrérie des Chevaliers du Tastevin (literally "Fraternity of the Knights of the Wine-Tasting Cup") is a Bacchanalian fraternity of wine connoisseurs established in 1934 to promote Burgundian wines and culture.

Originally formed under the Ancien Régime and re-established in 1934, the Chevaliers du Tastevin are based at the 12th-century château of Clos de Vougeot, in the French department of Côte d'Or.

With chapters worldwide, called Sous-Commanderies, in view of its Gallic heritage, the name and ceremonial titles are usually styled in French.

== History ==
The Chevaliers du Tastevin, in its present form, was founded in 1934. Its origins derive from the earlier Ordre des Buveurs Libres de Bourgogne (Order of the Free-Drinkers of Burgundy). The initial idea was to reinvigorate the Burgundian wine industry during the economic turmoil prior to World War II. The first meeting was held on 16 November 1934 in the Caveau Nuiton at Nuits-Saint-Georges.

The American branch was established on 27 March 1940 in New York by Jules Bohy; a chapter in Washington, D.C. opened in 1946).

In 1944, the Chevaliers du Tastevin's founding members bought the château of the Clos de Vougeot, making it the organization's headquarters, and then embarked upon the castle's renovation.

Open to men and women, there numbered about 12,000 members worldwide in 2016 (2,300 in the USA alone); there are 33 chapters in the United States and 75 worldwide. The primary aims of Chevaliers du Tastevin are "to hold in high regard and promote Burgundian produce, particularly her great wines and regional cuisine. To maintain and revive the festivities, customs and traditions of Burgundian folklore," and "to encourage people from all over the world to visit Burgundy."

== Symbols ==
Members wear ceremonial Tastevin that have ribbons of crimson and gold. These colors represent the pinot noir and the chardonnay, both grapes of Burgundy. New members receive the accolade by a petrified grapevine root from Burgundy.

At investitures, prospective members are adorned with ornate robes similar to academic gowns worn by doctors of theology in sixteenth-century France, before being admitted upon the following proclamation – French: Par Noé, Père de la Vigne, Par Bacchus, Dieu du Vin, Par Saint-Vincent, Patron des Vignerons, nous vous armons Chevalier du Tastevin (English: "Through Noah, Father of Vines, Bacchus, God of Wine, Saint-Vincent, Patron of Winemakers, we make admit you as a Knight of the Tastevin").

Its magazine, Tastevin en Main, is published twice a year.

== Activities ==
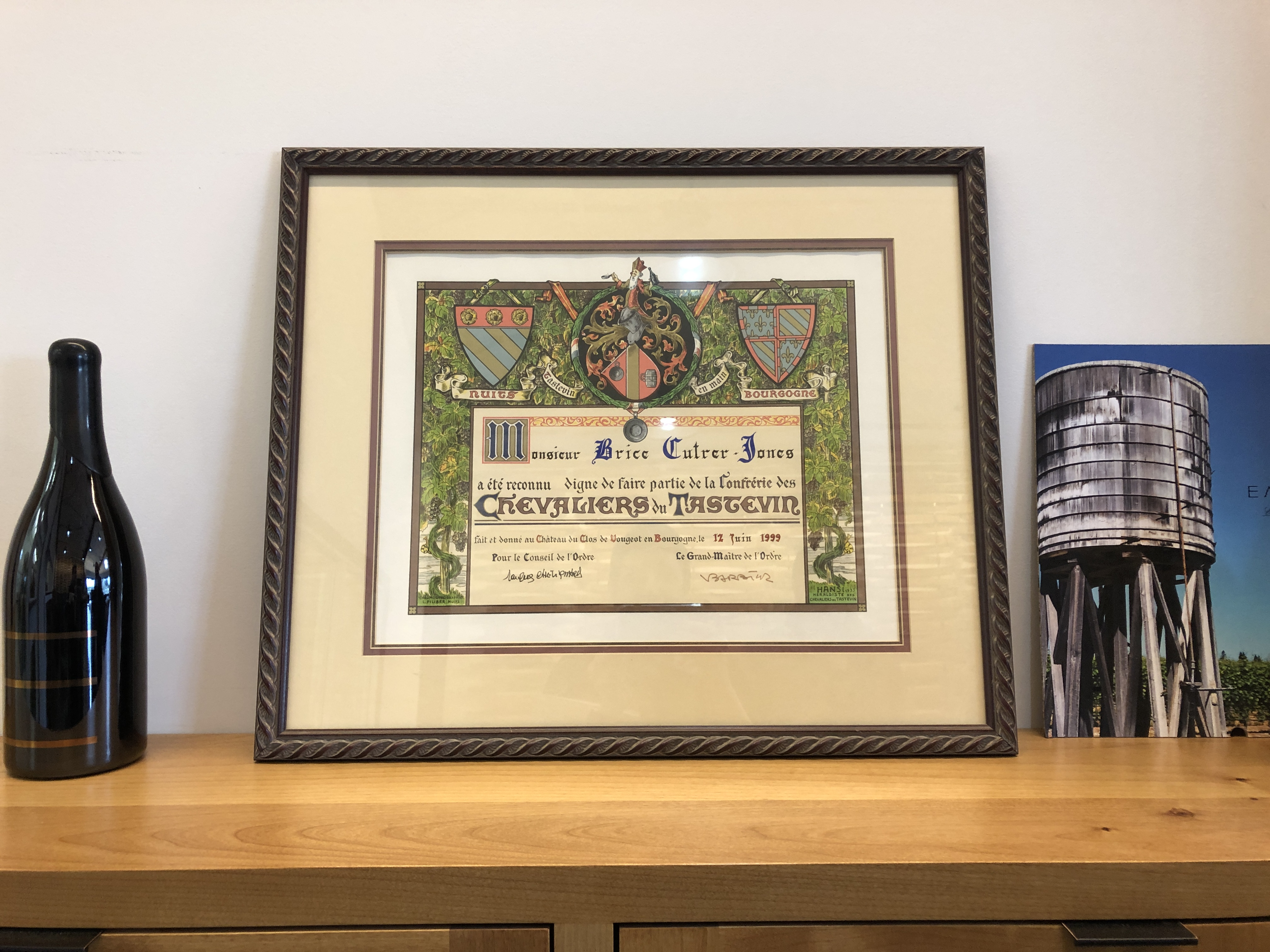
Membership certificate of a Chevalier du Tastevin

Chevaliers du Tastevin's activities are generally scheduled around sumptuous chapter dinners and other culinary events, where Burgundian wines are served (and occasionally other quality French wines, eg. Bordeaux, are tasted). At these events, it is customary for the Chevaliers to give detailed appraisals on the background and characteristics of each wine or dish being served; neatly described as "viticultural and gastronomic education", such critique also serves as peer review.

Each chapitre collects and stores its own wine, with one member assigned to look after the cellar.

The principal annual event of the organization is the tasting of Burgundy wines, called Tastevinage, at the Château du Clos de Vougeot, when wines deemed worthy by a jury of tasters are awarded the accolade of Tasteviné and are permitted to use a special label on their bottles.

== Organization ==
Chevaliers du Tastevin is governed by a Grand Conseil of Chevaliers, headed by the Grand Maître, with a secretary known as the Grand Connétable. In the United States, the organization delegates authority to a Grand Pilier, who is also assisted by a Grand Connétable. Membership is hierarchically ranked (in descending order) from grand officier, officier-commandeur, commandeur, to chevalier.

== Membership ==
Candidates for membership are approved by the Grand Pilier or Grand Connétable, subject to confirmation by the Grand Conseil of Chevaliers in France. Its membership includes businessmen, politicians, military leaders, diplomats, scholars, athletes, musicians and artists.

== Notable members ==
- Valéry Giscard d'Estaing, President of France
- General Charles de Gaulle, first President of the 5th French Republic
- Kevin O'Leary, Canadian entrepreneur
- Canon Félix Kir, Mayor of Dijon (1945–68)
- Ralph Beauclerk MBE, 6th marquis de Valero de Urria
- Torquhil Campbell, 13th Duke of Argyll
- Nathalie Kosciusko-Morizet, French politician
- Andrew Mitchell, British politician
- Barrie Hall, British musician

== Bibliography ==
- Jean-Francois Bazin, Bernard Pivot, Confrerie des Chevaliers du Tastevin: 1934 - 1994, Les Editions du Tastevin (1994)
