= Andrew Mitchell =

British politician (born 1956)

The Right Honourable Sir Andrew Mitchell KCMG MP
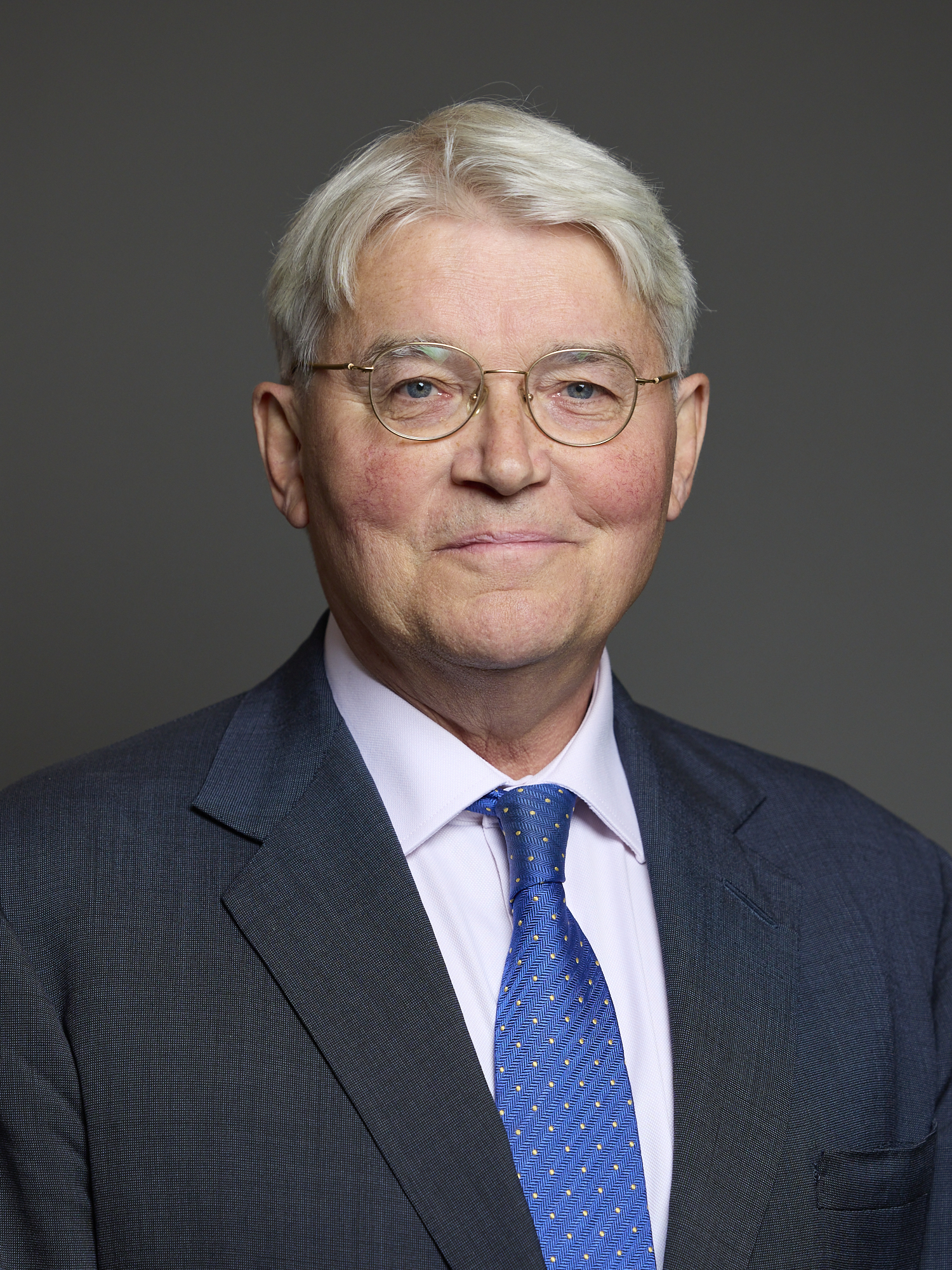
- Official portrait, 2024

Shadow Foreign Secretary
- In office 8 July 2024 – 4 November 2024
- Leader: Rishi Sunak
- Preceded by: David Lammy
- Succeeded by: Priti Patel

Deputy Foreign Secretary
- In office 12 April 2024 – 5 July 2024
- Prime Minister: Rishi Sunak
- Foreign Secretary: David Cameron
- Preceded by: Office established
- Succeeded by: Office abolished

Minister of State for Development and Africa
- In office 25 October 2022 – 5 July 2024
- Prime Minister: Rishi Sunak
- Preceded by: Vicky Ford (Note: As Minister of State for Development); Gillian Keegan (Note: As Parliamentary Under-Secretary of State for Africa)
- Succeeded by: Anneliese Dodds; The Lord Collins of Highbury

Government Chief Whip in the House of Commons; Parliamentary Secretary to the Treasury
- In office 4 September 2012 – 19 October 2012
- Prime Minister: David Cameron
- Preceded by: Patrick McLoughlin
- Succeeded by: Sir George Young

Secretary of State for International Development
- In office 12 May 2010 – 4 September 2012
- Prime Minister: David Cameron
- Preceded by: Douglas Alexander
- Succeeded by: Justine Greening
Shadow Cabinet portfolios
Shadow Secretary of State for International Development
In office 7 May 2005 – 11 May 2010
Leader	Michael Howard; David Cameron
Preceded by	Alan Duncan
Succeeded by	Douglas Alexander
Junior ministerial offices
Parliamentary Under-Secretary of State for Social Security
In office 6 July 1995 – 2 May 1997
Prime Minister	John Major
Preceded by	Alistair Burt
Succeeded by	John Denham
Lord Commissioner of the Treasury
In office 20 July 1994 – 6 July 1995
Prime Minister	John Major
Preceded by	Irvine Patnick
Succeeded by	David Willetts

Member of Parliament
- Incumbent
- Assumed office 7 June 2001
- Preceded by: Norman Fowler
- Constituency: Sutton Coldfield
- Majority: 2,543 (5.3%)
- In office 11 June 1987 – 8 April 1997
- Preceded by: Philip Holland
- Succeeded by: Vernon Coaker
- Constituency: Gedling

Personal details
- Born: Andrew John Bower Mitchell; 23 March 1956 (age 70) Hampstead, London, England
- Party: Conservative
- Spouse: Sharon Bennett (m. 1985)
- Children: 2
- Parent: David Mitchell (father)
- Education: Ashdown House School; Rugby School; Jesus College, Cambridge (MA)
- Website: Constituency website

Sir Andrew John Bower Mitchell KCMG (born 23 March 1956) is a British politician who was Shadow Foreign Secretary from July to November 2024 and served as Deputy Foreign Secretary from April to July 2024. He was also Minister of State for Development and Africa between October 2022 and July 2024. A member of the Conservative Party, he has served as the Member of Parliament (MP) for Sutton Coldfield since 2001 and previously served as the MP for Gedling from 1987 to 1997. Mitchell served in the Cabinet as Secretary of State for International Development from 2010 to 2012 and then briefly as Government Chief Whip in the House of Commons in late 2012.

Mitchell studied history at Jesus College, Cambridge, where he was elected President of the Cambridge Union in 1978. He was elected to the House of Commons for Gedling in Nottinghamshire at the 1987 general election. He served in the second Major government as a Lord Commissioner of the Treasury from 1994 to 1995 and as a junior minister at the Department of Social Security from 1995 to 1997. Mitchell lost his seat to the Labour Party's Vernon Coaker at the 1997 general election. In 2001, he contested Sutton Coldfield in the West Midlands, a safe seat for the Conservatives, and was returned to Parliament. Mitchell was appointed to the Shadow cabinet in 2005 as Shadow Secretary of State for International Development. In this role, he founded Project Umubano, a Conservative Party social action project in Rwanda and Sierra Leone in central and west Africa.

Under the coalition government of David Cameron, he served as Secretary of State for International Development from 2010 to 2012. In the September 2012 cabinet reshuffle, he was appointed chief whip. Amid public pressure due to the Plebgate scandal, Mitchell resigned from the government the following month, and returned to the backbenches. In 2022, after serving on the backbenches for 10 years, Mitchell made a return to government as Minister of State for Development and Africa following the appointment of Rishi Sunak as prime minister. He was appointed to the honorific title of Deputy Foreign Secretary in April 2024. Following the defeat of the Conservative party in the 2024 general election, Mitchell became Shadow Foreign Secretary in the Sunak shadow cabinet.

== Early life and career ==
Mitchell was born at Hampstead in north London, the son of Sir David Bower Mitchell, a future Conservative MP of 33 years, and Government Minister. He was educated at Ashdown House School and Rugby School, where—as a self-confessed "stern disciplinarian"—he earned the nickname "Thrasher".

In February 1975, he joined the Royal Tank Regiment as a second lieutenant on a Short Service Limited Commission (a commission designed for teenagers applying to Oxford or Cambridge University after leaving the sixth form), spending time in Cyprus where his unit was carrying out peacekeeping duties. In October of that year, he transferred to the Territorial and Army Volunteer Reserve. He resigned his commission on 9 February 1977.

He went to the University of Cambridge, where he read History at Jesus College. He was Chairman of the Cambridge University Conservative Association in the Michaelmas Term of 1977. He served as President of the Cambridge Union 1978–79, after graduating with a Bachelor of Arts degree in 1978, later promoted by seniority to Master of Arts.

Mitchell worked for Lazard, the investment bank, where he worked with British companies seeking large-scale overseas contracts.

== Political career ==
=== Early career (1983–2005) ===
Mitchell was the only Conservative member of Islington Health Authority (IHA) in north London during the 1980s and, in that capacity, he called for the IHA to make greater use of competitive tendering in the allocation of service contracts.

After unsuccessfully contesting Sunderland South at the 1983 general election, Mitchell entered Parliament in 1987 at the age of 31 as MP for Gedling, Nottinghamshire, serving in the House of Commons concurrently with his father until 1997. In 1988, under Prime Minister Margaret Thatcher, he became PPS to William Waldegrave, who was Minister of State at the Foreign and Commonwealth Office. In 1990, he became PPS to John Wakeham, who was Secretary of State for Energy. In 1992, under John Major, he became Vice-Chairman of the Conservative Party, and in the same year was appointed as an Assistant Government Whip. In 1993, he became a Government Whip. In 1995, he became Parliamentary Under-Secretary of State at the Department of Social Security, a position he held until 1997.

Mitchell lost his Commons seat with Tony Blair's Labour victory at the 1997 election. He was returned to Parliament at the 2001 election as the MP for Sutton Coldfield, near Birmingham. He held no shadow ministerial or organisational position under the leadership of Iain Duncan Smith, but in November 2003, under new leader Michael Howard, he became Shadow Economic Affairs Minister. In 2004, he became Shadow Home Office Minister, primarily dealing with police matters.

=== Shadow International Development Secretary (2005–2010) ===
In May 2005, Mitchell was appointed to the Shadow Cabinet as Shadow Secretary of State for International Development. Following Howard's decision to stand down as leader following the Conservatives' 2005 general election defeat, Following Michael Howard's decision to stand down after the 2005 general election, Mitchell helped run David Davis's unsuccessful Conservative leadership campaign. After David Cameron won the leadership, Mitchell remained in the Shadow Cabinet as Shadow Secretary of State for International Development.

==== Project Umubano ====
Mitchell led groups of Conservative volunteers from the professions in social development projects in Rwanda for three consecutive summers, from 2007 to 2009, as part of Project Umubano, and kept a detailed diary of their activities and experiences. The volunteers focused on five areas: health, education, justice, the private sector, and a community centre construction project. In 2008, Mitchell himself taught English to over a thousand Rwandan primary school teachers. It was during one of these trips that Mitchell and his aides are reported to have verbally abused one of the volunteers, a student journalist who had circulated a draft newspaper article she had written stressing the positives of the project, but also pointing out some problems with its operation. The journalist, Lucy Kinder, claimed Mitchell texted her father, a friend from Mitchell's university days: "They [his aides] are threatening her with physical violence and I can't say I blame them".

==== Views on Gaza ====
Mitchell expressed support for the idea of a televised appeal for Gaza on the BBC in 2009, a subject which had aroused much controversy on both sides of the argument. He said that, while the matter was ultimately for the BBC to decide, "We believe that they should allow the broadcast to proceed so that the British public, who have proved themselves so generous during recent emergencies in the Congo and Burma, can make their own judgement on the validity of the appeal".

Following the resignation of Baroness Warsi during the 2014 Israel–Gaza conflict, Mitchell criticised repeated Israeli attacks on UN schools and called for an arms embargo, warning that the misery suffered by an "enormous number of innocent people" was poisoning attitudes.

=== International Development Secretary (2010–2012) ===
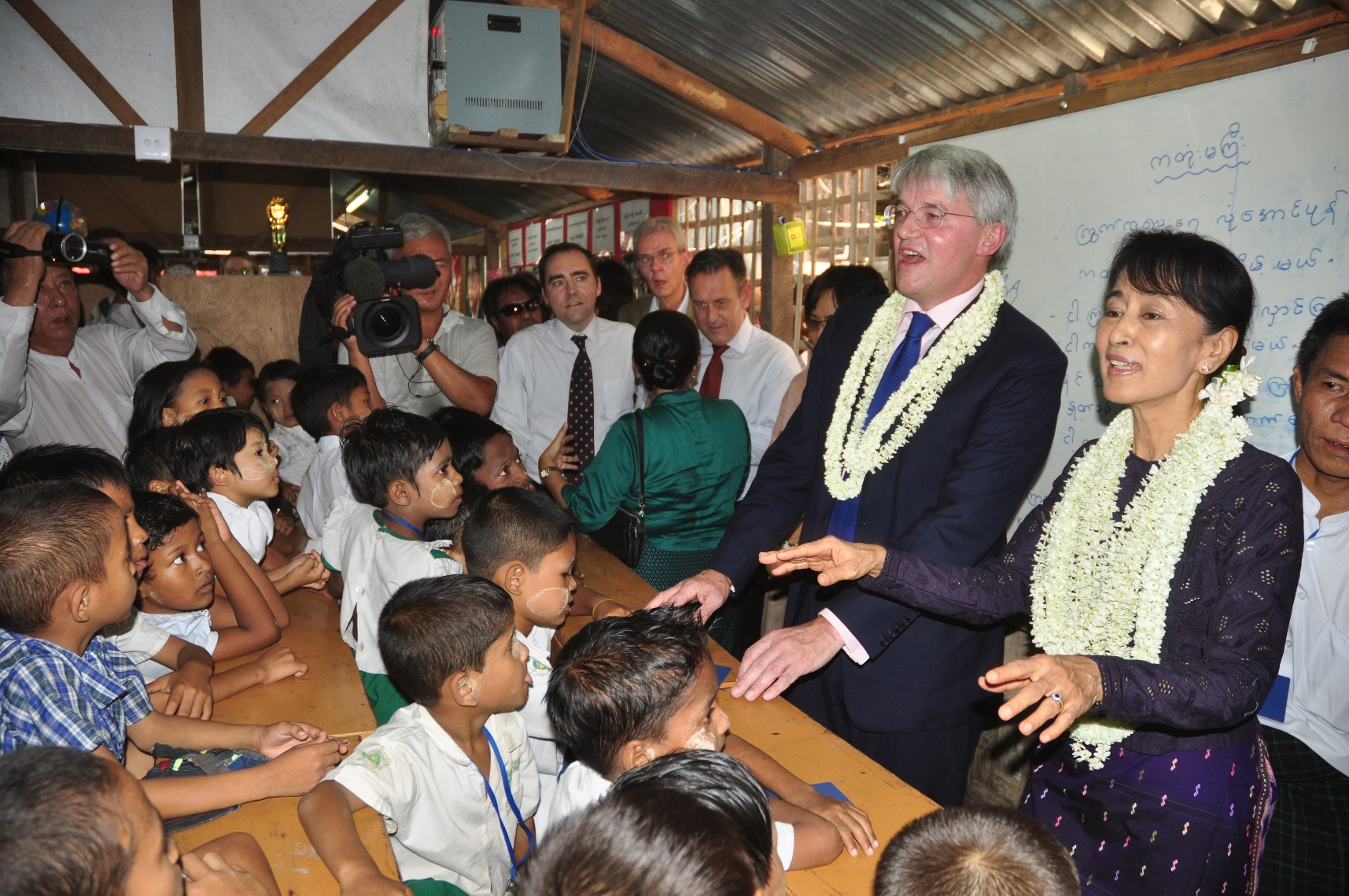
Mitchell and human rights activist Aung San Suu Kyi meet schoolchildren in Myanmar, 2011.

Following the general election and formation of the Conservative – Liberal Democrat coalition in May 2010, he became Secretary of State for International Development.

Mitchell travelled to countries in need of aid. He visited Pakistan during the floods in 2010 and returned the following year. He also visited Haiti, to see the effects of the earthquake, and Somalia and Libya in 2011. He also addressed the United Nations General Assembly in 2010 to press the case for greater support for the developing world, strongly criticised the developed world for failing in its responsibilities towards it, and announced that Britain would double its aid contribution to Pakistan.

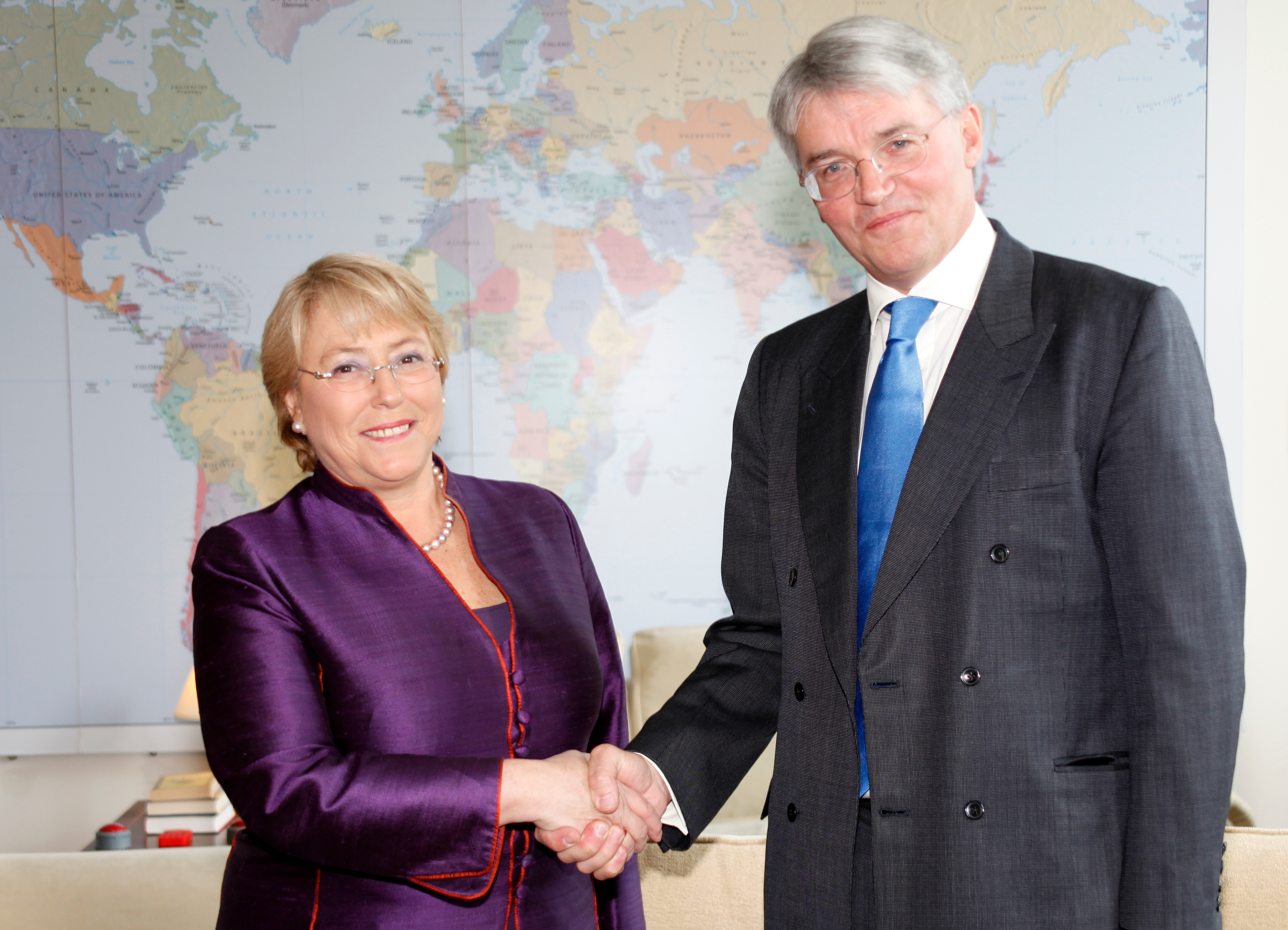
Mitchell with Michelle Bachelet, head of UN Women

Both in Opposition and Government, Mitchell asserted the need for transparency and value for money in British aid contributions to the developing world, with resources concentrated on the world's poorest and most troubled countries.

During the 2011 Battle of Tripoli, Mitchell said that the UK had learned from Iraq and had laid the groundwork for a post-Gaddafi Libya. While emphasising that the transition should be Libyan-led, he said that Libya's allies had outlined steps to ensure a smooth transition. He added, "We have made clear that there should be no revenge attacks," and, "Libyans have to work together for a new Libya. They should keep in place the sinews of security. The National Transitional Council (NTC) in Benghazi has good informal connections with security officials in Tripoli and has told them: 'You've got a job, please help us keep stability'." He added that "Divisions between the rebels groups are overstated. The way the National Transitional Council has reached out gives us some confidence."

Mitchell accepted that a smaller aid budget might have meant fewer cuts elsewhere, but insisted that development projects also helped protect Britain. "Our security is not just provided by soldiers and tanks and fighter jets, it is also provided by training the police in Afghanistan, by building up governance structures in the Middle East and by getting girls into school in the Horn of Africa," he said, "Those things are all part of what makes us safer."

==== Praise in debate ====
On 1 July 2010, at the end of a debate on global poverty in the House of Commons, the minister of state for international development, Alan Duncan, quoted the journalist Jon Snow as having said, "Andrew Mitchell is unquestionably the best prepared Secretary of State – nobody has waited longer in the wings and everyone in the sector knows of his commitment to the sector".

==== Aid transparency ====
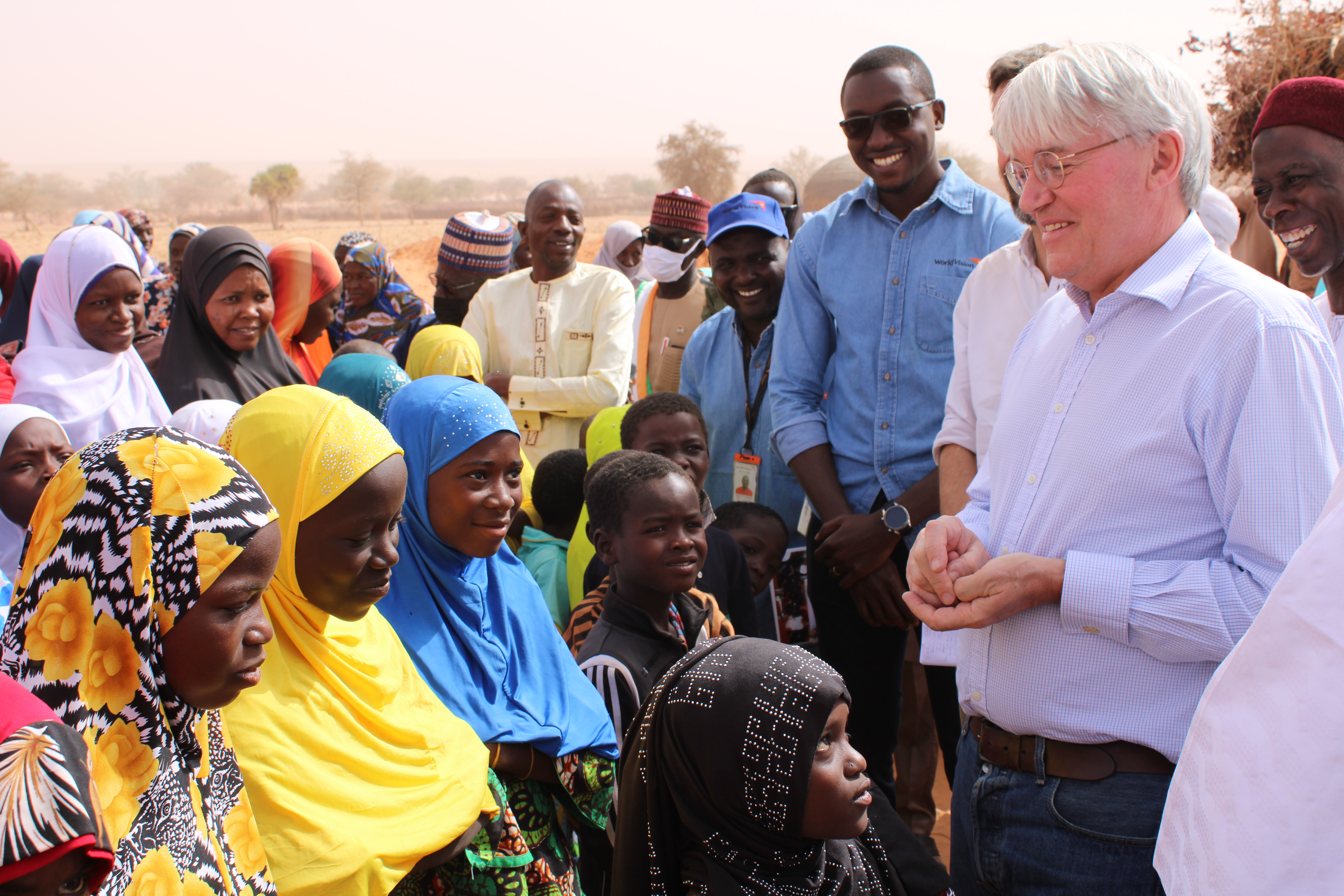
Mitchell visits Niger in 2023 to announce a fund for the Sahel.

Both in Opposition, and later as Secretary of State for International Development, Mitchell repeatedly asserted the need for transparency in aid donations to other countries, with contributions fully accounted for and published, and announced his intention for Britain to lead the world in this transparency. He made clear that value for money in aid donations was of critical importance and provided a guarantee that British legislation would be amended to ensure that Britain's aid contributions would be maintained at 0.7 per cent of UK GNI (Gross National Income) by 2013. He also asked former international envoy and Liberal Democrat leader Paddy Ashdown to conduct a review of the UK's response to international humanitarian disasters, such as the 2010 Haiti earthquake, to see whether lessons could be learned from them.

==== Aid to Rwanda ====
On his final day as International Development Secretary, Mitchell authorised the payment of £16 million of previously suspended aid to Rwanda, half of Britain's annual aid to Rwanda. The aid had been suspended in July, along with other governments' aid, over concerns about Rwanda's alleged support of the rebel March 23 Movement in east Democratic Republic of the Congo. Mitchell's successor stopped further aid payments as Rwanda had breached agreements, and following the publication of a United Nations Security Council investigators' report which provided evidence that Rwanda had supplied guns, money and recruits to the rebels contrary to United Nations Security Council Resolution 1807, and engaged directly in combat to help the rebels capture territory.

The International Development Select Committee launched an inquiry into the suspending, then subsequent authorisation, of budget support to Rwanda. On 30 November 2012 the committee published its report criticising Mitchell for restoring the funding, stating "We do not understand how [Mitchell] reached the conclusion that support for the M23 had ceased", which was one of the three conditions that the prime minister had set for the resumption of aid.

=== Chief Whip and "Plebgate" (2012) ===
In September 2012, Mitchell was appointed Government Chief Whip in David Cameron's first significant Cabinet reshuffle.

On the evening of 19 September, Mitchell allegedly swore when a police officer told him to dismount from a bicycle and exit Downing Street through the pedestrian gate rather than the main gate. The leaked official police log of the incident stated that Mitchell said "Best you learn your fucking place. You don't run this fucking government...You're fucking plebs". The allegations became known in the media as "Plebgate".

Mitchell's alleged comments attracted strong criticism from some branches of the Police Federation, and from police officers in general, not least because they came on the day after the murder of two police officers in Manchester.

In response to the allegations, Mitchell apologised, but disputed many of the details of the accusations, in particular that he had used the word "pleb". He later resigned on 19 October.

In December 2012, CCTV evidence was published in the media which appeared to contradict the police account of the incident, along with evidence that an email corroborating the police account and purporting to be sent by a member of the public to their MP was actually sent by an off-duty police officer who was not at the scene. Additionally, a claim by Police Federation officers from the West Midlands Police who met Mitchell that he refused to give his side of events was contradicted by a recording of the meeting, made by Mitchell himself, and subsequently released to the media. The Metropolitan Police investigation of both the leak of the police log and the discrepancies between it and other accounts was known as Operation Alice.

Mitchell strongly disputed the police account of the incident in statements to the media, and in an article in The Sunday Times alleged the police officers were involved in a "cynical smear campaign".

Operation Alice resulted in one police officer, Constable Keith Wallis, being charged with misconduct in a public office, for sending an email in which he falsely claimed to be an ordinary member of the public who had witnessed the alleged incident from the public footpath outside the Downing Street gates. On 10 January 2014, Wallis pleaded guilty to the charge. Wallis was dismissed from the police force and three other police officers who were involved in aspects of 'Plebgate' were dismissed for gross misconduct. Following Wallis' conviction, Mitchell received a public apology from the commissioner of the Metropolitan Police, Bernard Hogan-Howe, and fellow MPs called for him to be reappointed to the cabinet.

Mitchell launched a civil libel case against UK newspaper The Sun, which had first published reports of the affair. He was countersued by PC Toby Rowland, the officer who had been on duty at the Downing Street gate. On 27 November 2014, Mr Justice Mitting ruled against Mitchell, describing his behaviour as childish and saying: "I am satisfied at least on the balance of probabilities that Mr Mitchell did speak the words alleged or something so close to them as to amount to the same including the politically toxic word pleb". In consequence, Mitchell lost the libel cases against both The Sun and PC Rowland and became liable for both parties' costs, which were estimated at £2m. Mitchell said he was "bitterly disappointed". On 30 January 2015, court papers revealed that News Group newspapers offered a deal on 19 September 2014 which would have allowed Mitchell to avoid liability for the legal costs incurred by the media organisation up to that date. However, the offer did not include any apology from the publisher and Mitchell turned it down. The media organisation's legal costs subsequently increased by at least £500,000.

PC Rowland successfully sued Mitchell for libel and agreed to accept a payment of £80,000 in damages.

=== Backbenches (2012–2022) ===
Speaking in January 2018, to the Jesus College, Cambridge, Debating Society, Mitchell expressed the belief that Labour would win the next general election and Jeremy Corbyn would become the next prime minister. Mitchell explained that this was a prospect he regarded with apprehension, and speculated that under a Labour Government borrowing and taxation would increase drastically.

In October 2018, Mitchell said that by supporting the Saudi coalition "Britain is complicit in creating" a famine in Yemen.

On 31 January 2022, after Boris Johnson issued a statement to the house about the interim report by Sue Gray, into the Partygate scandal, Mitchell announced that he no longer supported the prime minister. Mitchell had previously been one of Johnson's longest supporters. In 1993, Johnson attempted to stand as a Conservative candidate in the 1994 European Parliament elections. Mitchell convinced Prime Minister John Major, who was critical of Johnson, not to veto Johnson's candidacy, but Johnson could not find a constituency.

=== Development and Africa Minister (2022–2024) ===
After serving on the backbenches for over a decade, Mitchell returned to the government under Prime Minister Rishi Sunak and was appointed to a cabinet attending role as Minister of State for Development and Africa in the Sunak ministry.

Following the November 2023 British cabinet reshuffle, former prime minister David Cameron became Foreign Secretary, which left Mitchell as the most senior foreign office official in the House of Commons. Because of this, Mitchell was appointed to the honorific title of Deputy Foreign Secretary on 12 April 2024.

=== Return to opposition (2024–present) ===
Following the Conservative party's defeat in the 2024 general election, Cameron resigned from the frontbench and Mitchell was appointed to what would have been Cameron's position Shadow Foreign Secretary in the Sunak shadow cabinet.

Following the election of Kemi Badenoch as Leader of the Opposition in November 2024, Mitchell was replaced as Shadow Foreign Secretary by Dame Priti Patel and left the Shadow Cabinet.

== Work as an MP ==
=== Keep Justice Local campaign ===
In 2002, Mitchell led the successful Keep Justice Local campaign across his constituency of Sutton Coldfield to safeguard the 50-year-old Magistrates' Court from closure. He presented a petition signed by more than 5,500 constituents, protesting at plans to transfer the court's work to Birmingham.

However, its closure was again announced in December 2010 by the government in which Mitchell was by then a minister. He said, "We must now ensure that there's a widespread local discussion about the future of the site and the building. I know that our councillors are already looking at how best we can do this". The site was subsequently sold to the Sutton Coldfield Muslim Association in 2012 and converted into a Masjid.

=== Voting record ===
In 1994, as MP for Gedling, Mitchell voted in the House of Commons for the restoration of the death penalty; the motion was defeated 383–186. Between 2001 and 2010, as MP for Sutton Coldfield, his House of Commons voting record shows that he voted for limiting climate change, civil partnerships for gay couples, greater autonomy for schools, a UK referendum on the EU Lisbon Treaty, replacement of Trident, the invasion of Iraq and the subsequent Iraq investigation, and limiting pollution from civil aviation. During the same period, he voted against ID cards, the closure of post offices, both 42 days' and 90 days' detention without charge or trial, the DNA database, closer EU integration, the relaxation of gambling laws, Section 28 (although in 1988 he had voted in favour), employment discrimination against gay people, the legalisation of recreational drugs, a fully elected House of Lords, and a ban on fox hunting.

In 2013 Mitchell voted against the legalisation of same-sex marriage and also voted for an amendment to the bill which would have allowed a government registrar to opt out of performing marriage ceremonies 'to which he had a conscientious objection'. He was ranked by the Liberal Democrat Voice (connected to, but not part of, the Liberal Democrat Party) as one of the least authoritarian members of Parliament, scoring 3 out of 100 points for his votes between 2005 and 2010. with a joint ranking of 542 out of 619.

Mitchell supported continued membership of the European Union in the 2016 referendum.

== Controversies ==
=== Allegations of lobbying on behalf of donors ===
An article in The Sunday Times newspaper on 30 October 2010, quoted by The Guardian newspaper the following day, claimed that Mitchell had pressured the Foreign Office and colleagues to lobby Ghana (successfully) for the lifting of a trading ban on a cocoa company, Armajaro, which had been a repeated donor to Mitchell's parliamentary office and also a donor to the Conservative Party. Ghana had imposed the ban as the company was believed to have been smuggling cocoa out of the country. However, when questioned by ITV News on 2 November about his role in the case, Mitchell said that he had a duty as a member of the government to respond to the company's requests, as it was registered as a British company, and that the government had a responsibility to promote British trade. He argued that he had seen no evidence that the Ghanaian government's suspicions about the company in question had been substantiated, and that the claim that he had acted improperly on behalf of a party donor was unreasonable, as the company had ceased to donate to both the Conservative Party and his parliamentary office several years earlier.

=== Allegations of tax avoidance ===
In 2006, Mitchell invested funds in privately owned firms implicated in a tax avoidance scheme. According to The Daily Telegraph, a subsidiary of DV3 purchased the lease on the Dickins & Jones department store building in central London for £65.1 million and sold it a month later to a partnership controlled by DV3 for £65,100, thus avoiding stamp duty. The loophole, although legal, was reported by The Times to be considered "aggressive tax avoidance" by Revenue & Customs.

== Personal life ==
Mitchell is married to Dr Sharon Bennett, a GP and a former dentist, and has two daughters, born December 1987 and December 1990. He maintains a residence in his constituency of Sutton Coldfield and primarily lives in Islington, London. In the 1980s, he lived at Tithby in Rushcliffe, west of Langar. He married in August 1985 at St Bartholomew-the-Great, in central London.

Mitchell is a trustee of International Inspiration – a charity that promotes access to sport, play and physical exercise in low and middle income countries around the world. He sits on the Board of Trustees alongside Sebastian Coe, Katherine Grainger and David Davies.

Mitchell was previously a trustee of the E. M. Radiation Research Trust, now known as the Radiation Research Trust, which conducts research into radiation emissions, from sites such as mobile phone masts. He was also a senior strategy adviser for consultants Accenture. He is also Freeman of the City of London and a Liveryman of the Vintners' Company.

In 2010, Mitchell was sworn in as a Privy Councillor. On 11 April 2025, Mitchell was appointed a Knight Commander of the Order of Saint Michael and Saint George in former prime minister Rishi Sunak's Resignation Honours list.

Mitchell is a member of the Burgundian bacchanalian fraternity, the Confrérie des Chevaliers du Tastevin.

== Publications ==
- Beyond a Fringe : Tales from a reformed Establishment lackey (Biteback Publishing, London, 2021)

== Sources ==
- Purnell, Sonia (2011). Just Boris: Boris Johnson: The Irresistible Rise of a Political Celebrity. London: Aurum Press Ltd. ISBN 978-1-84513-665-9.

== Notes ==
Parliament of the United Kingdom
Preceded by Philip Holland	Member of Parliament for Gedling; 1987–1997	Succeeded by Vernon Coaker
Preceded by Norman Fowler	Member of Parliament for Sutton Coldfield; 2001–present	Incumbent
Political offices
Preceded by Douglas Alexander	Secretary of State for International Development; 2010–2012	Succeeded by Justine Greening
Preceded by Patrick McLoughlin	Government Chief Whip in the House of Commons; 2012	Succeeded by George Young
Preceded by Patrick McLoughlin	Parliamentary Secretary to the Treasury; 2012	Succeeded by George Young
Preceded by Vicky Ford	Minister of State for Development; 2022–2024	Succeeded by Anneliese Dodds
Preceded by David Lammy	Shadow Foreign Secretary; 2024	Succeeded by Priti Patel
Party political offices
Preceded by Patrick McLoughlin	Conservative Chief Whip in the House of Commons; 2012	Succeeded by George Young
