= West Mercia Police Authority =

West Mercia Police Authority was the governing body of the West Mercia Police force in the English counties of Herefordshire, Worcestershire, and Shropshire until November 2012. Police authorities were replaced by directly elected police and crime commissioners. The current police and crime commissioner for West Mercia is Bill Longmore.

== Constitution ==
Police Authorities were usually a board of members consisting of local councillors and independent members appointed directly to serve in that role.

In West Mercia, the Police Authority had a membership of 17 people drawn from across the force area:

- Nine members were Councillors, nominated by the lead local authorities in West Mercia.
- Eight are Independent Members directly appointed (at least one of these members has to be a magistrate).

The Police Authority also had two co-opted Independent Members appointed to the Standards Committee.

== See also ==
- Police Authority
