= Philip Seccombe =

English police commissioner

Colonel Philip Seccombe

Warwickshire Police and Crime Commissioner
- Incumbent
- Assumed office 12 May 2016
- Preceded by: Ron Ball

Personal details
- Born: July 1951 (age 74)
- Party: Conservative

Philip Stanley Seccombe (born July 1951) is the Warwickshire Police and Crime Commissioner, representing the Conservative Party. He was first elected at the elections for police and crime commissioners held across England and Wales on 5 May 2016, with 43,208 votes. He was re-elected at the 2021 England and Wales police and crime commissioner elections with 85,963 votes, winning in the first round with 52.07%. He won a third term at the 2024 England and Wales police and crime commissioner elections with 45,638 votes, beating his rival candidate by 261 votes.

Seccombe previously served for 14 years as a councillor on Stratford upon Avon District Council, and also served for 25 years in the Territorial Army where he commanded his Regiment and reached the rank of colonel. He has also served as chairman of the West Midlands Reserve Forces’ and Cadets’ Association and chairman of the Warwickshire Army Benevolent Fund.

Nationally, Philip has served as the chair of the Emergency Services Collaboration Working Group, and the lead of the portfolio group on emergency services collaboration at the Association of Police and Crime Commissioners.

After his election, he launched a Police and Crime Plan. The plan agreed major new investments in equipment and infrastructure for Warwickshire Police including new mobile technology for frontline officers, and confirmed £1.6 million in funding through a grants scheme targeted at community initiatives to reduce crime and anti-social behaviour or provide increased support for victims of crime across the county. He also co-commissioned new services with Warwickshire County Council to support victims of domestic abuse. In 2020 Seccombe announced he had secured more funding for services tackling domestic abuse, coming from the Ministry of Justice.

Philip is married to Cllr Izzi Seccombe, the first female leader of Warwickshire County Council and Vice-Chairman of the LGA.

== Controversies ==
In July 2024, Seccombe admitted to being present at a dinner hosted by the University of Warwick Conservative Association the previous month, where students were filmed singing along to 'Erika' a marching song associated with Nazis. The conservative association was later suspended by the University of Warwick. Seccombe claimed to have only been present for part of the event.

In October 2024, Labour MP Matt Western accused Seccombe of accepting money from the Countryside Alliance (of which Seccombe is a member) to influence policing of trail hunting. Western also described a review of Warwickshire Police's handling of the Warwickshire Hunt as a "sham". The review later found that Seccombe's membership had no impact on the policing of hunting in Warwickshire.
