= Deborah Glass =

Australian lawyer

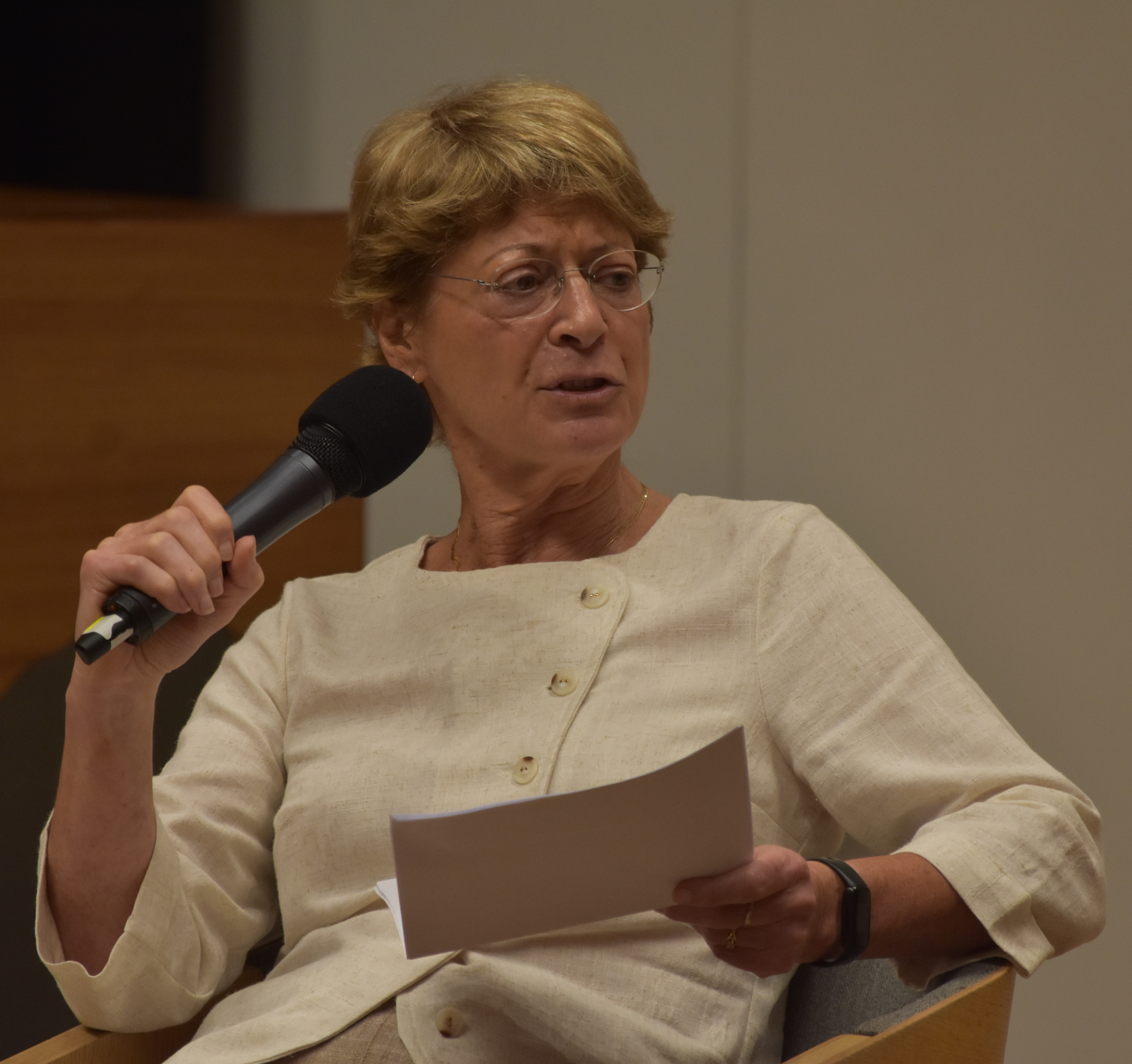
Glass in 2025 at Trinity College

Deborah Glass OBE (born 1959) is an Australian lawyer, who was the Victorian Ombudsman between March 2014 and March 2024, when she was succeeded by Marlo Baragwanath.

A lawyer by profession, she spent her formative years in Melbourne, Australia, before taking her career overseas to Switzerland, Hong Kong, and the United Kingdom. From 2008 to 2014, Glass was the deputy chair of the Independent Police Complaints Commission (IPCC) in the United Kingdom. She was also one of the IPCC's ten operational Commissioners, in which capacity she had joint regional responsibility for London and the South-East.

== Early years ==
Glass was born in 1959 in Bega, New South Wales, and raised in Melbourne. She attended Mount Scopus Memorial College and then Monash University, where she obtained her BA in 1980 and LLB in 1982.

== Career ==
Glass practiced law briefly in Melbourne, before relocating to Switzerland in 1985 to work for Citicorp, a US investment bank. In 1989 she was appointed to the Hong Kong Securities and Futures Commission, where she became Senior Director and was instrumental in raising standards in the investment management industry. She then moved to London in 1998 where she became Chief Executive of the Investment Management Regulatory Organisation, which under her stewardship was successfully subsumed into the London-based Financial Services Authority. She also worked as an Independent custody visitor between 1999 and 2005. In 2001, Glass was appointed to the Police Complaints Authority, and in 2004 became a Commissioner with the Independent Police Complaints Commission (IPCC). She was the Commissioner responsible, among other things, for London, and for many high-profile criminal and misconduct investigations and decisions involving the police. These included decisions in relation to the police response to the News International phone hacking scandal phone-hacking affair, the death of Ian Tomlinson during the London G20 protests in 2009, the decision to launch an independent investigation into the aftermath of the Hillsborough disaster, and the Plebgate affair. In 2012 Glass was awarded an Order of the British Empire for her service. She left the IPCC in March 2014, having completed a 10-year term with the organisation, which then published her personal critique of the police complaints system in England and Wales. Glass returned to Australia in 2014 and was appointed by the state government as Ombudsman Victoria for a 10-year fixed term. Glass was awarded Monash University Faculty of Law's Distinguished Alumni Award in 2016.

== Victorian Ombudsman ==
Deborah Glass served as the Victorian Ombudsman from 2014 to 2024, a decade marked by significant investigations, reform efforts, and challenges within public administration in Victoria.

As an Ombudsman, Glass' role included overseeing investigations that held government agencies accountable and advocating for vulnerable communities. Her legacy is built upon her commitment to transparency, accountability, and justice, even in the face of political challenges and systemic inertia.

=== Appointment as Ombudsman ===
After Glass's career took her abroad for almost 30 years, she returned to Melbourne in 2014 and was appointed as Victorian Ombudsman by the Liberal government led by Premier Denis Napthine. Glass regularly commented on the importance of her 10-year fixed, non-renewable term allowing her to act with complete independence, free from concerns about reappointment or political pressure. This autonomy is central to the Ombudsman role, and Glass leveraged it to carry out many high-profile investigations that sought to improve fairness and integrity in government operations.

=== Leadership and vision ===
From the beginning of her term, in reports and speeches Glass articulated a vision focused on addressing the imbalance of power between the individual and the state. She believed in using the Ombudsman's powers judiciously, advocating for change through collaboration wherever possible rather than relying on coercive measures. “The most impactful powers are the ones you don’t need to use because everyone knows you have them,” she once said.

Under her leadership, the Ombudsman's office became known for its expertise in independent, evidence-based investigations and its focus on systemic issues and human rights, ensuring that complaints were used to drive improvements in public administration.

=== Major investigations and achievements ===
Throughout her tenure, Glass oversaw investigations that had far-reaching impacts on public administration in Victoria. One of her most significant early investigations was into the historic child sexual abuse at Puffing Billy, a heritage railway. Glass's report revealed decades of negligence in dealing with abuse allegations and led to a public apology from Premier Daniel Andrews and other political leaders for the historic failures of the State to protect children. Glass described this investigation as one of the most emotionally impactful of her career, highlighting the importance of apologies in the healing process for victims.

One of the most poignant investigations during Glass's tenure was the Mentone Gardens case, which began with a complaint from a 91-year-old resident, Allan Lorraine, whose retirement home went bankrupt, leaving elderly residents without the refundable accommodation bonds they had paid.

Glass's investigation uncovered a litany of regulatory failures by the Department of Health, highlighting the vulnerability of the elderly residents, many of whom had lost not only their savings but also their dignity and independence. Glass's recommendation for an ex-gratia payment to the residents led to a $4.33 million settlement from the Victorian Government. The case became a symbol of the power of the Ombudsman to address bureaucratic failures and restore justice to those affected, and Lorraine himself was later awarded the Order of Australia Medal for his advocacy.

Another major investigation was into WorkSafe Victoria’s handling of complex workers' compensation claims. Glass's findings exposed systemic issues, with injured workers being unfairly denied compensation due to unreasonable decision-making by WorkSafe agents. Her two investigations into the issue led to significant reforms, including the establishment of an arbitration function to resolve disputes more efficiently, and featured in the Four Corners program ‘Immoral and Unethical’ in June 2020.

=== COVID-19 pandemic and public housing lockdown investigation ===
One of the defining moments of Glass's term came during the COVID-19 pandemic. In July 2020, the Victorian Government implemented a hard lockdown on public housing towers in Flemington and North Melbourne. Unlike other lockdowns, which allowed residents time to prepare, the public housing lockdown was enforced immediately, with police surrounding the buildings. Complaints to the Ombudsman's office prompted Glass to launch an investigation.

This revealed that the decision to impose the immediate lockdown had not been based on direct public health advice, and the Chief Health Officer had been given less than 15 minutes to consider the human rights implications. Glass found that the government's actions breached the residents’ human rights, particularly their right to humane treatment when deprived of liberty. Among other recommendations for reform, her report called for an apology to residents from the government, which was largely ignored.

While the government did not issue a formal apology, Glass's report made international headlines and led to significant changes in how subsequent COVID-19 outbreaks were handled. A year later, during another outbreak in the towers, the public health response was significantly more humane, focusing on communication and health support rather than police enforcement. Glass's work during this period highlighted the importance of balancing public health measures with human rights considerations, a theme that resonated throughout her term.

=== Advocacy for OPCAT and prison oversight ===
Glass was also a passionate advocate for the implementation of the Optional Protocol to the Convention Against Torture (OPCAT), a United Nations treaty aimed at preventing torture and other forms of ill-treatment in places of detention.

Although Australia ratified OPCAT in 2017, Victoria lagged in its implementation, failing to designate an independent agency to carry out inspections of prisons and other closed environments. In a series of reports, Glass argued that the Ombudsman's office was uniquely positioned to take on the role of OPCAT inspections, given its existing powers and expertise in overseeing places of detention. She pointed out that the cost of implementing OPCAT in Victoria was minimal, especially when compared to the potential costs of failing to prevent abuse and misconduct in detention facilities. Despite her advocacy, the Victorian Government did not act on her recommendations during her term, citing cost concerns. Glass's work on OPCAT was closely linked to her broader efforts to improve prison conditions and protect the rights of detainees.

In her 2015 report on the rehabilitation and reintegration of prisoners, she criticised the Victorian prison system for its lack of focus on rehabilitation, warning that the increasing prison population and high rates of recidivism were unsustainable. Her recommendations led to improvements in rehabilitation programs and a greater focus on reducing reoffending, although she remained critical of the government's reliance on incarceration as a solution to social problems.

=== Challenges and political tensions ===
Throughout her tenure, Glass faced political challenges, particularly from the Labor government under Premier Daniel Andrews which was in power for most of her 10-year term. The most notable of these challenges arose from her investigation referred by the Legislative Council in November 2015 into the "Red Shirts scandal", where ALP members of Parliament were accused of misusing public funds for political campaigning. The government challenged her jurisdiction to investigate Members of Parliament, leading to a legal battle that ultimately upheld Glass's authority to conduct the investigation.

Tensions in her relationship with the Andrews government were exacerbated by critical investigations into aspect of the Andrews government's decision-making during the COVID-19 pandemic, and by her last major report into a matter also referred by Parliament, in which she described ‘creeping politicisation’ and a ‘culture of fear’ within Victoria's public sector.

=== Legacy and reflections ===
As her term concluded in 2024, Deborah Glass reflected on her decade as Ombudsman. Under her leadership, the Ombudsman's office had tabled 99 reports in Parliament, resolved thousands of complaints, held public officials and agencies to account, and driven systemic improvements in many areas including local government, public housing and youth justice.

In her final report, Glass quoted Edmund Burke: “It is not what a lawyer tells me I may do; but what humanity, reason, and justice tell me I ought to do.” This, she said, was a guiding principle for her office.

== Publications ==
Some of Glass's key investigations as Victorian Ombudsman have been:

- Investigation into Department of Health oversight of Mentone Gardens, a Supported Residential Service (April 2015)
- Investigation into the rehabilitation and reintegration of prisoners in Victoria (September 2015)
- Investigation into public transport fare evasion enforcement (May 2016)
- Investigation into the management of complex workers compensation claims and WorkSafe oversight (September 2016)
- Investigation into the transparency of local government decision making (December 2016)
- Investigation into the management of maintenance claims against public housing tenants (October 2017)
- Implementing OPCAT in Victoria: report and inspection of the Dame Phyllis Frost Centre (November 2017)
- Investigation into the financial support provided to kinship carers (December 2017)
- Investigation of a matter referred from the Legislative Council on 25 November 2015 (March 2018)
- Investigation into child sex offender Robert Whitehead's involvement with Puffing Billy and other railway bodies (June 2018)
- OPCAT in Victoria: A thematic investigation of practices related to solitary confinement of children and young people (September 2019)
- WorkSafe2: Follow-up investigation into the management of complex workers compensation claims (December 2019)
- Investigation into review of parking fines by the City of Melbourne (September 2020)
- Investigation into the detention and treatment of public housing residents arising from a COVID-19 'hard lockdown' in July 2020 (December 2020)
- Investigation into the Department of Jobs, Precincts and Regions’ administration of the Business Support Fund (April 2021)
- Investigation into how local councils respond to ratepayers in financial hardship (May 2021)
- Investigation into decision-making under the Victorian Border Crossing Permit Directions (December 2021)
- Investigation of a matter referred from the Legislative Council on 9 February 2022 Part 1 (July 2022)
- Operation Watts, a joint investigation into allegations of serious corrupt conduct involving Victorian public officers, including Members of Parliament
- WorkSafe 3: Investigation into Victorian self-insurers’ claims management and WorkSafe oversight
- Investigation into the Department of Transport and Planning's implementation of the zero and low emission vehicle charge
- Watchdog for the people: 50 years of the Victorian Ombudsman
- Investigation into healthcare provision for Aboriginal people in Victorian prisons
- Reflections on 10 years
