= Peter Joslin =

British police officer and Deputy lieutenant of Warwickshire

Chief Constable Peter Joslin QPM, DL

Chief Constable of Warwickshire Police
- In office 1983–1998
- Preceded by: Roger Birch
- Succeeded by: Andrew Timpson

Personal details
- Born: 26 October 1933 (age 92)
- Education: Essex University
- Profession: Police officer

Peter Joslin QPM DL (born 26 October 1933) is a former British police officer and Deputy lieutenant of Warwickshire. He served as Chief Constable of Warwickshire Police, where he held the position for fifteen years from 1983 to 1998, becoming the county's longest serving police chief. In addition at the time of his retirement in 1998 he was also one of the United Kingdom's longest serving police officers, having served for 44 years.

== Career ==
Joslin was educated at King Edward VI Grammar School, Chelmsford. After completing his National Service with the Royal Corps of Signals Joslin joined the Essex Constabulary in 1954. He worked for them for twenty years, serving as both a uniformed and CID officer, and also spent three years at Essex University studying for an honours degree in government and politics. In 1974 he left Essex Police to join the Leicestershire Constabulary, and in 1983 was appointed as Chief Constable of the neighbouring Warwickshire force.

During his career Joslin campaigned on road safety and traffic issues. He also served as chairman of the Association of Chief Police Officers traffic committee where he advocated tough drink-driving laws. He was also responsible for the introduction of speed cameras on British roads, but later became a critic of their excessive use. He was awarded the Queen's Police Medal in 1992. He retired from the police in October 1998, having served as Warwickshire Chief Constable for fifteen years, the county's longest serving police officer in that job. His 44-year service also made him Britain's longest serving police officer at the time of his retirement.

He was appointed a Deputy Lieutenant of Warwickshire in 1999, and is also President of Warwickshire Association for the Blind.

In November 2012 he attracted criticism from the government after urging voters to boycott the elections for Police and Crime Commissioners, saying that it would allow people with little experience of policing to take charge of law enforcement matters. "Here we are changing it so that people with little experience and few qualifications, and certainly little knowledge of the police, could be put in a position where they can go as far as sacking the chief constable." Damian Green, the Minister for Policing and Criminal Justice, branded Joslin's comments as "deeply irresponsible". His remarks also attracted criticism from the three candidates standing in the Warwickshire area.

Joslin's son, Russell Joslin, was a BBC journalist. In the case following his suicide, Russell Joslin's account of sexual harassment by Liz Kershaw was brought to light.
