= Bill Longmore =

William Morgan Longmore aka Bill Longmore

West Mercia Police and Crime Commissioner
- In office 22 November 2012 – 11 May 2016
- Preceded by: Office created
- Succeeded by: John Campion

Personal details
- Born: 18 August 1938 Stourbridge, Worcestershire, England
- Died: 17 May 2018 (aged 79) Shrewsbury, Shropshire, England
- Party: Independent

William Morgan Longmore, more publicly known as Bill Longmore (18 August 1938 – 17 May 2018) was the Independent West Mercia Police and Crime Commissioner. He was the first person to hold the post and was elected on 15 November 2012. A former police officer with Staffordshire Police, Longmore was a businessman prior to his election. He attracted controversy shortly after taking office for appointing his former campaign manager as his Deputy.

== Police career and election ==
Longmore, who was brought up at Amblecote near Stourbridge, was a serving police officer with Staffordshire Police for 30 years from 1957, rising to the position of Superintendent.

Following his retirement from the force, he enjoyed a second career as a businessman, building up a manufacturing company, buying two factories and converting them to timber mills.

In 2011, Longmore won the BBC Midlands Sports Unsung Hero Award – an award recognising those involved in community sports projects, and which was presented to him for his work towards improving sports facilities in the village of Hanwood, Shropshire, where he settled after buying a former farmhouse. He was a district councillor in Cannock, Staffordshire, where he lived previously, and a parish councillor in Hanwood. In 2017, he and his wife, Ursula, formed the Great Hanwood Community Interest Company, which purchased the then-closed Cock Inn at Hanwood with the aim of reopening it for public community use.

Longmore ran as an independent Police and Crime Commissioner candidate for West Mercia Police in the first elections for the post in November 2012, and was subsequently elected to the position. During his campaign, he said that his intention was to serve a single term in office.

Longmore fulfilled his election pledge to retire at the next PCC election, which took place on 5 May 2016. His deputy, Barrie Sheldon, stood as Independent candidate but lost to Conservative candidate John Campion.

== Death ==
While serving as Police and Crime Commissioner, Longmore received a diagnosis of lung cancer, for which he received chemotherapy. He died at his home on 17 May 2018 aged 79. His funeral took place at Shrewsbury Crematorium on 9 June 2018, with a thanksgiving service at Shrewsbury Abbey Church the same day. He was survived by Ursula, whom he had married in 1989.
