= Bacchanalian fraternity =

Type of fraternal organization

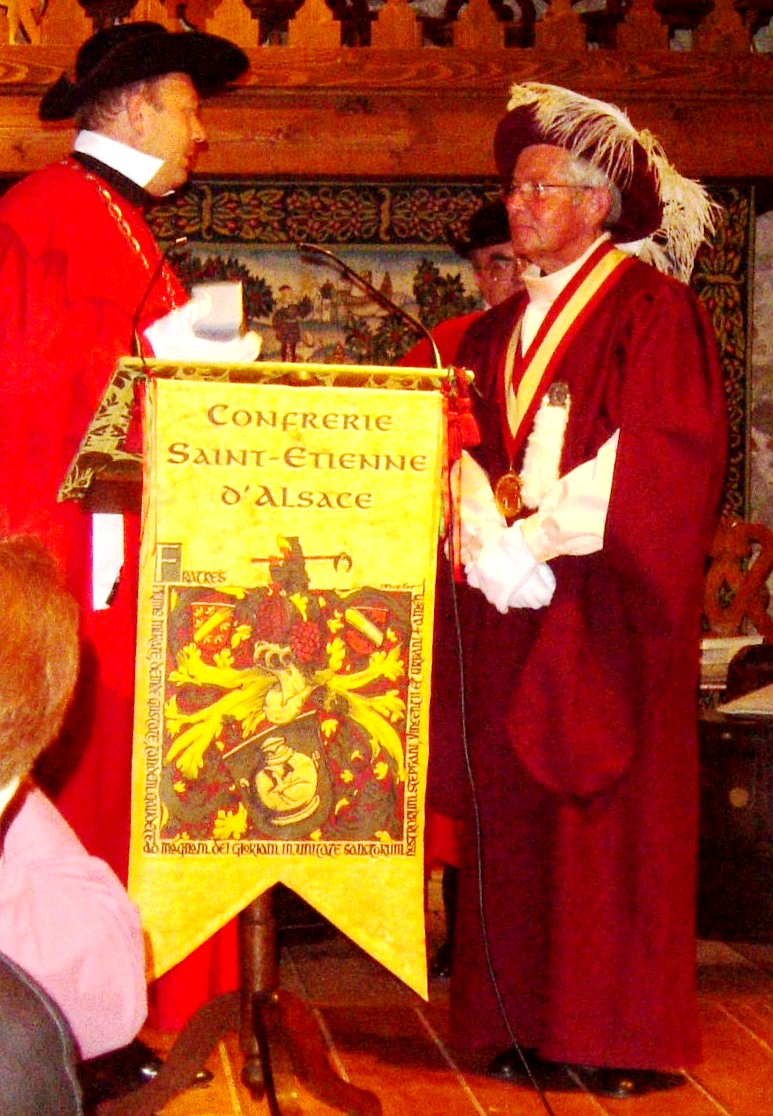
Reception of Commanderie des Grands Vins d'Amboise of Confrérie Saint-Étienne d'Alsace in Kientzheim, Alsace (2005).

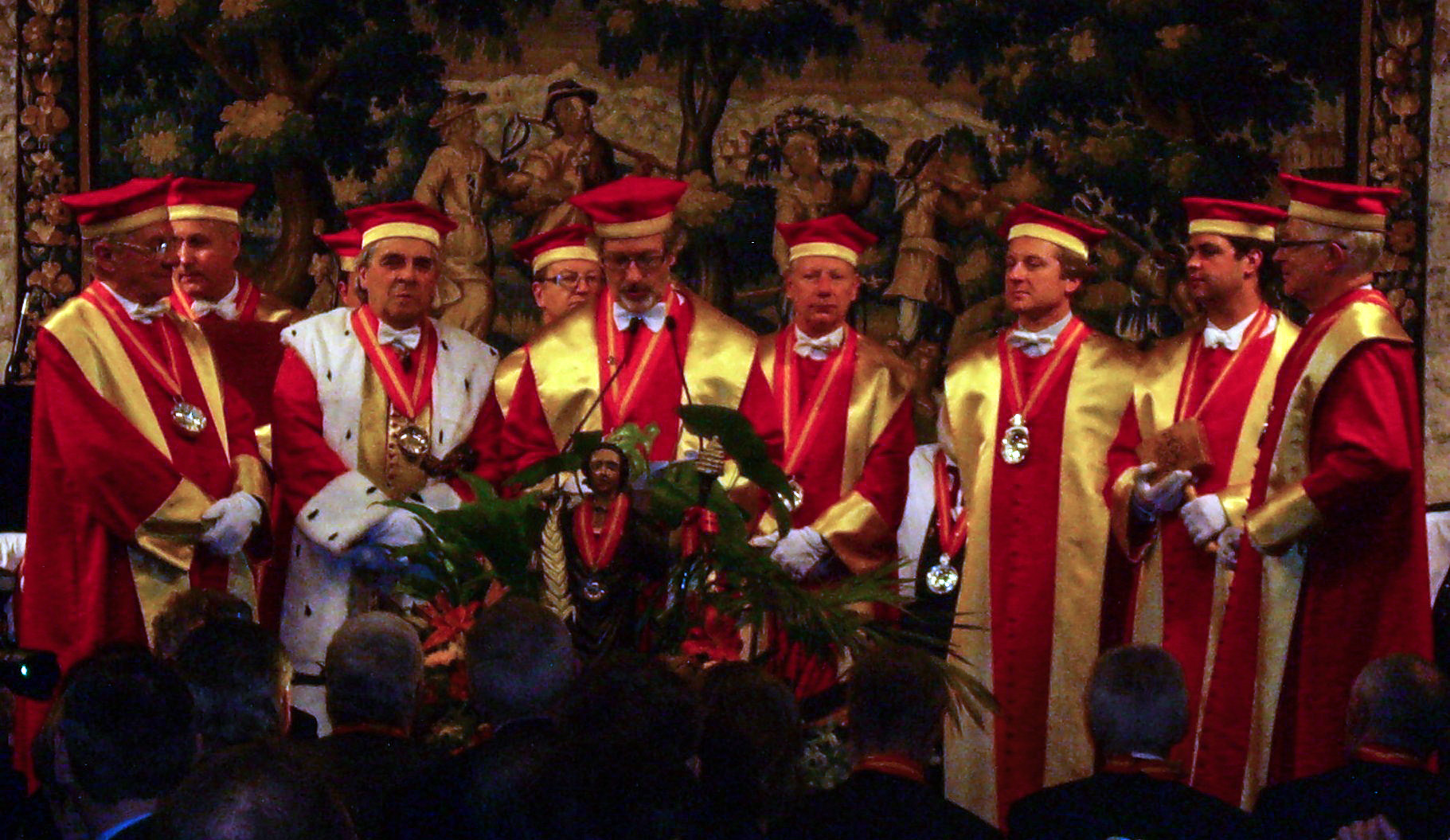
Members of Chevaliers du Tastevin.

A Bacchanalian fraternity is a fraternal society of professional or amateur aficionados of wine and perhaps other alcoholic beverages, typically promoting the wines of represented regions, such as wines from France and Germany. The term derives from Bacchus, the Roman equivalent of Dionysus, god of wine and intoxication.

Some of the societies date to the early modern era. Other modern ones have various affiliations, such as in the form of student societies.

== History ==
It is believed that Bacchanalian rituals first started in southern Italy and were introduced to Etruria and Rome. They probably originated from the Greek Dionysia festival. Historically, they were secret gatherings. Extreme orgies were a natural part of the entertainment. The members of Bacchanalian gatherings were called Bacchantes, and their sanctuary a Bacchanal. The initiation to join the group lasted 10 days, during which the applicant must refrain from sex. At its origins, the Bacchanalian societies were made up of women only.

The Campanian matron Paculla Annia eventually changed the method of celebration, by admitting men and going from a 3-day annual gathering to a 5-day monthly gathering. Around 186 BC, the Roman Senate found out about those unofficial Bacchanalian rituals and launched a repressive campaign against it. An estimated 7,000 members were prosecuted amidst a violent repression. The women were returned to their families for private punishments, while the men were imprisoned or executed. The destruction of all Bacchanalia was ordered by the Roman authorities. The Senatus auctoritas de Bacchanalibus decree was passed to forbid any future similar order.

Eventually, the Bacchanalian ordeal was replaced by the softer Liberalia festival.

== See also ==
- Dionysia
- Liberalia
