= Hamble College of Air Training =

Aviation school in Hampshire, England

Coordinates: 50°52′01″N 1°19′19″W

Hamble school of Air Training was a flight training centre in Hampshire, England.

During the late 1950s it became apparent that there was going to be a shortage of ex military pilots who would be available to crew British civil aircraft. The two (then) state owned airline corporations, British Overseas Airways Corporation (BOAC) and British European Airways (BEA), in collaboration with the Ministry of Aviation, proposed a flying school based loosely on the Royal Air Force's officer training school at Cranwell. The site chosen was a small airfield at Hamble, Hampshire in the Southern United Kingdom, used at the time by Air Service Training and Southampton University Air Squadron. The first course of cadets began training in 1960.

The school continued operations until the mid-1980s: British Airways (the merged BOAC and BEA) announced the closure in 1982 and in 1984 the land was sold for development and the equipment disposed of.

For the first few years of operation the course lasted two years: later courses were shortened to eighteen months. Cadets were accepted equally from the ranks of school leavers and university graduates: previous flying experience was not a requirement. Following fifteen weeks of ground study, ab initio and, later, advanced flying training commenced.

Ground training included aerodynamics, astronavigation, meteorology, propulsion and many other disciplines. Flying training commenced after fifteen weeks, initially on De Havilland Chipmunk then Piper Cherokee aircraft, progressing to twin engine experience on Piper Apaches and later Beechcraft Barons. A graduate would leave the college with a British commercial pilot's licence and a "frozen" airline transport pilot's licence, which could be converted into a full ATPL after further examinations and having accumulated the requisite flying hours.
