= Warwickshire Police =

English territorial police force

Agency overview
- Formed: 1840; 186 years ago
- Employees: 1,937 (2020)
- Volunteers: 165 (2020)
- Annual budget: £80.1 million

Jurisdictional structure
- Operations jurisdiction: Warwickshire, England
- Jurisdictional area shown within England
- Area: 762 square miles (1,970 km^{2})
- Population: 554,002
- Legal jurisdiction: England & Wales
- Constituting instrument: Police Act 1996
- General nature: Local civilian police

Operational structure
- Overseen by: His Majesty's Inspectorate of Constabulary and Fire & Rescue Services; Independent Office for Police Conduct
- Headquarters: Leek Wootton
- Police officers: 1,126 (2024); 64 special constables (2024)
- PCSOs: 58 (2024)
- Police and crime commissioner responsible: Philip Seccombe
- Agency executive: Alex Franklin-Smith, Chief constable
- Districts/Boroughs: 2 districts and 3 boroughs

Facilities
- Stations: 15

Website
- www.warwickshire.police.uk

Warwickshire Police is the territorial police force responsible for policing Warwickshire in England. It is the second smallest territorial police force in England and Wales after the City of London Police, with 1,126 regular officers as of July 2024. The resident population of the force area is 554,002.

== History ==
The force was established in 1840 as Warwickshire Constabulary. It did not, however, even cover all the rural areas of the county until 1857. Birmingham, Coventry, Leamington Spa, Stratford-upon-Avon and Warwick originally had their own police forces. The Warwickshire force absorbed Warwick Borough Police in 1875 and Stratford-upon-Avon Borough Police in 1889 with Leamington Borough Police lasting until 1946. In 1969, Coventry City Police amalgamated with Warwickshire Constabulary and the force became Warwickshire and Coventry Constabulary. However, with the inclusion of Coventry in the new county of the West Midlands in 1974, Coventry passed to the new West Midlands Police, which also took over the areas of the Birmingham City Police and part of the northwestern area of Warwickshire (around Solihull and Sutton Coldfield). Warwickshire Constabulary reverted to its old name. In 2001, its name was changed to Warwickshire Police.

Under proposals announced by the then Home Secretary, Charles Clarke, on 6 February 2006, Warwickshire Police would have merged with Staffordshire Police, West Mercia Constabulary and West Midlands Police to form a single strategic force for the West Midlands region. These proposals were subsequently abandoned.

Warwickshire Police was until April 2007 a partner alongside three other forces in the Central Motorway Police Group.

In December 2010, the Warwickshire Justice Centre was completed in Newbold Terrace, Leamington Spa. As well as a police station, the complex houses the magistrates' court, Crown Court, County Court, and other agencies such as the Probation Service and Victim Support. It was officially opened by Queen Elizabeth II on 4 March 2011. A similar complex was already in operation in Nuneaton.

=== Chief constables ===
The force has had a number of chief constables since 1857:

- 1857–1876: James Issac
- 1876–1892: J. H. Kinchant (fled to India and dismissed)
- 1892–1929: Captain John Turner Brinkley
- 1929–1948: E. K. H. Kemble
- 1948–1958: Lt-Col. Geoffrey C. White
- 1958–1964: Peter Ewan Brodie
- 1964–1976: Richard Bonnar Matthews
- 1976–1978: Albert Laugharne
- 1978–1983: Roger Birch
- 1983–1998: Peter D. Joslin
- 1998–2000: Andrew C. Timpson
- 2000–2006: John Burbeck
- 2006–2011: Keith Bristow
- 2011–2015: Andy Parker
- 2015–2021: Martin Jelley
- 2021–2024: Debbie Tedds
- 2024–present: Alex Franklin-Smith

== Organisation ==
Warwickshire Police Ford Ranger pictured in 2020

The force is run by a chief constable, a Deputy chief constable, an assistant chief constable. As of September 2020, the force has 1,041 police officers, 100 special constables, 87 police community support officers (PCSO), 65 police support volunteers (PSV), and 809 staff.

The county is divided into five districts and boroughs (based on local government districts/boroughs). There are 33 local policing teams within Warwickshire Police – called Safer Neighbourhood Teams,

- North Warwickshire Borough
- Nuneaton and Bedworth Borough
- Rugby Borough
- Stratford-on-Avon District
- Warwick District

The districts and boroughs are grouped into three policing areas, each commanded by a superintendent. North Warwickshire, Nuneaton and Bedworth make up the North Warwickshire policing area, Rugby makes up the East Warwickshire policing area and Leamington, Warwick and Stratford-on-Avon make up the South Warwickshire policing area.

The current chief constable is Debbie Tedds, who was appointed in July 2021 following the retirement of her predecessor Martin Jelley. He was appointed to the role on 7 April 2015, following the retirement of Andy Parker. Parker succeeded Keith Bristow on 1 December 2011. Bristow succeeded John Burbeck, who in turn succeeded Andrew Timpson, who in turn succeeded Peter Joslin.

=== West Mercia alliance ===
In September 2013, Warwickshire Police embarked on an alliance with West Mercia Police which saw one of the biggest reorganisations the force ever had. The alliance saw the sharing of back office facilities, force systems and support teams. In October 2018, West Mercia's chief constable and West Mercia Police and Crime Commissioner started formal proceedings to end the alliance. This action was not supported by Warwickshire's chief constable or the Warwickshire Police and Crime Commissioner. The alliance formally ceased to exist in October 2019.

== See also ==
- Law enforcement in the United Kingdom
- List of law enforcement agencies in the United Kingdom
- Table of police forces in the United Kingdom
- Warwickshire Fire and Rescue Service
