= Suffolk Constabulary =

English territorial police force

- Common name: Suffolk Police

Agency overview
- Formed: 1967; 59 years ago
- Preceding agencies: East Suffolk Constabulary; West Suffolk Constabulary; Ipswich Borough Police
- Employees: 1,399 police officers; 33 PCSOs; 917 police staff
- Volunteers: 116 special constables; 123 police support volunteers
- Annual budget: £157 million (2023 - 2024)

Jurisdictional structure
- Operations jurisdiction: Suffolk, England, UK
- Map of police area
- Area: 1,466 square miles (3,796 km2)
- Population: 761,000
- Legal jurisdiction: England & Wales
- Constituting instrument: Police Act 1996
- General nature: Local civilian police

Operational structure
- Overseen by: His Majesty's Inspectorate of Constabulary and Fire & Rescue Services; Independent Office for Police Conduct
- Headquarters: Martlesham
- Constables: 1,399 police officers; 116 special constables
- PCSOs: 36
- Police and Crime Commissioner responsible: Tim Passmore
- Agency executive: Rachel Kearton, Chief Constable

Website
- https://www.suffolk.police.uk/

Suffolk Constabulary is the territorial police force responsible for policing Suffolk in East Anglia, England. The force serves a population of 761,000 in a mostly rural area of 1,466 square miles (3,796 km^{2}), including 49 miles of coastline and the Southern part of the Broads National Park. Headquartered in Martlesham, Suffolk is responsible for Ipswich, Lowestoft, Bury St Edmunds and Felixstowe. As of March 2023, the force has a strength of approximately 1,399 police officers, 116 special constables, 917 police staff/designated officers, 33 PCSO's and 123 police support volunteers. The Chief Constable is currently Rachel Kearton, and the Police and Crime Commissioner Tim Passmore (Conservative).

== History ==
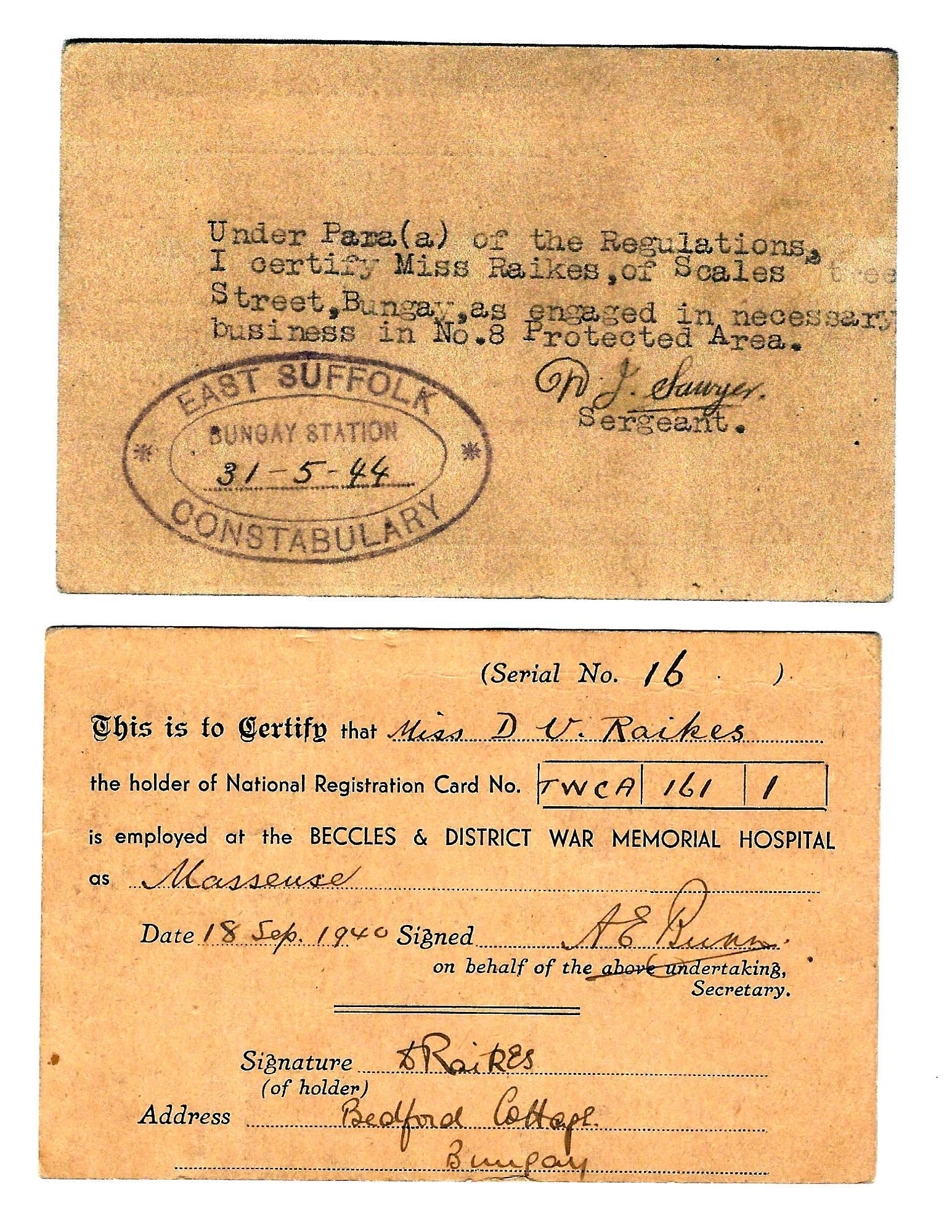
WWII pass from East Suffolk Constabulary allowing Bungay-living Miss Daphne Raikes, the Beccles & District War Memorial Hospital physiotherapist, to visit patients in the local wartime-protected Suffolk coastal area.

=== 19th and 20th century ===
Ipswich, Bury St Edmunds, Beccles and Orford formed their own borough police forces in 1836 following the Municipal Corporations Act 1835, which required local councils to appoint paid constable to keep the peace. Sudbury followed suit in 1835, along with Eye in 1840 and Southwold in 1844 each with their own borough police forces. Lowestoft and Dunwich also formed borough police forces around this time.

Ipswich Borough Police on its formation had a strength of 3 inspectors and 15 constables. They were headquartered at the town hall. In 1862 Ipswich Borough Police issued whistles to all its officers (much earlier than other forces) due to frequent assaults of officers at Ipswich Docks. In 1863 the force replaced top hats with helmets and badges.

Following the County Police Act 1839, East Sufolk Constabulary was created in 1840, followed by West Suffolk Constabulary in 1845 to cover the rural parts of the county not already covered by a borough force.

In 1857 Bury St Edmunds Borough Police merged with West Suffolk Constabulary and Beccles Borough Police merged with East Suffolk Constabulary.

In 1869, East Suffolk and West Suffolk Constabularies merged to form Suffolk Constabulary (excluding the Borough of Ipswich) under new Chief Constable Major Clement Henry John Heigham. Under this new merged force, there were six superintendents, six inspectors, six sergeants and 72 constables. Following the death of Major Heigham, the two forces separated again in 1899.

In 1889 Southwold Borough Police merged with East Suffolk Constabulary, following the Local Government Act 1888. Throughout its history it had a strength of a single constable. The people of Southwold didn't want anyone to look after them and reportedly only had one constable so as to look after the tourists.

In 1967, following the Police Act 1964, East Suffolk Constabulary, West Suffolk Constabulary and Ipswich Borough Police merged to form Suffolk Constabulary. Following the merger, there were 957 officers in Suffolk Constabulary. Following the merger, questions were being raised regarding the cost effectiveness of the Suffolk Cadet Force, where young cadets would eventually become constables. The last cadet to join under this scheme was in 1982, where the program was ended.

=== 21st century ===
In 2006, Suffolk Constabulary merged the role of traffic warden with that of PCSO.

Proposals announced by the then Home Secretary Charles Clarke in 2006 would have seen the force merge with neighbouring forces Norfolk Constabulary and Cambridgeshire Constabulary to form a strategic police force for East Anglia. However, the proposals were later abandoned.

In 2019, the UK Prime Minister announced that 20,000 new police officers would be recruited as part of a national uplift programme. Suffolk was allocated 179 of those new officers, which would bring the force strength up to more than 1,400 police officers by 2023.

In 2020, Suffolk recruited more female officers than male officers, being one of only eight forces in the UK to achieve this.

In 2022, Suffolk begun training recruits under the new Police Education Qualifications Framework (PEQF), which sees a partnership of training with Anglia Ruskin University.

=== Chief constables ===
- 1967–1968: Sir Peter Jack Matthews (formerly chief constable of East Suffolk and afterwards chief constable of Surrey, 1968–72)
- 1970–1976: Arthur Burns
- 1976–1989: Stuart Leonard Whiteley
- 1989–1998: Anthony Thomas Coe
- 1998–2002: Sir Paul Joseph Scott-Lee (afterwards Chief Constable of the West Midlands, 2002)
- 2003–2007: Alastair McWhirter
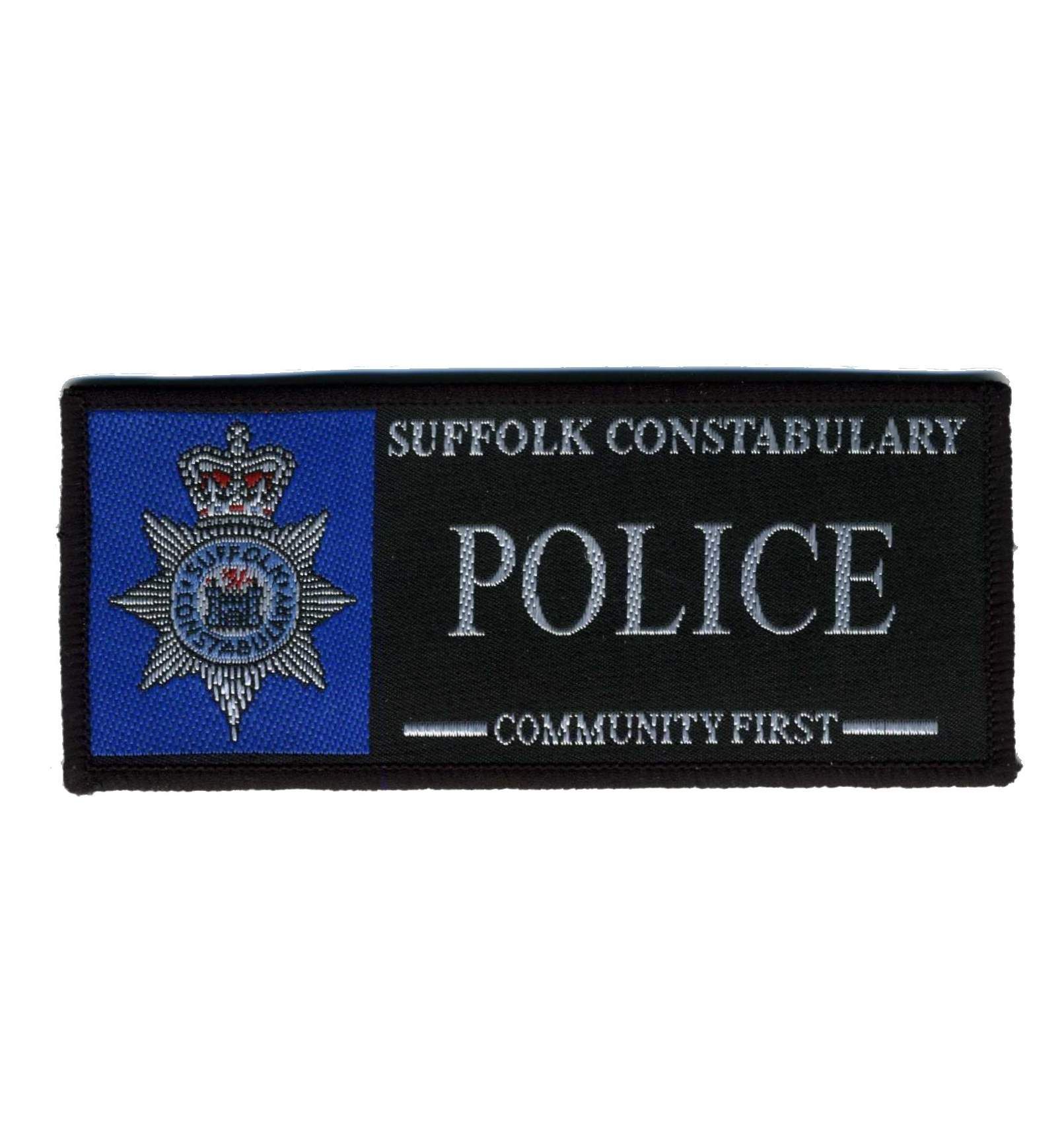
  Suffolk Constabulary Patch
  2007–2013: Simon Ash
- 2013–2015: Douglas Paxton
- 2016–2019: Gareth Wilson
- 2019–2022: Steve Jupp
- 2022–present: Rachel Kearton

== Organisation ==
Suffolk Constabulary is responsible for policing Suffolk's 4 major settlements, Ipswich, Lowestoft, Bury St Edmunds and Felixstowe.

It is also responsible for Suffolk's 49 miles of coastline, along with many rivers, including the southern Broads National Park. It also has responsibility for the Port of Felixstowe, the largest shipping container port in Britain.

There are 1,106 police constables (PC's) in Suffolk (with the remainder being officers of the rank sergeant and above). This accounts for 145 police constables per 100,000 population. 302 officers are assigned to neighbourhood policing whilst 357 are assigned to incident/response management.

=== Sizewell Nuclear Power Stations ===
In conjunction with the Civil Nuclear Constabulary, Suffolk is responsible for Sizewell A & B, on the East Suffolk coastline.

=== Military Bases ===
Suffolk is home to a number of major Army, RAF and USAF military bases, of which it works closely with. These include Wattisham Air Station, Mildenhall and Lakenheath.

=== Eastern Region Special Operations Unit (ERSOU) ===
Created in 2010, ERSOU is funded by the seven police forces that make up the eastern region, with Bedfordshire Police being the lead force. It is primarily responsible for the combined Regional Organised Crime Unit and Counter Terrorism Policing.

== Collaboration ==
=== Norfolk and Suffolk Collaboration ===
Norfolk Constabulary and Suffolk Constabulary have collaborated numerous services together since 2010. An extensive programme of collaborative work has already delivered a number of joint units and departments in areas such as Major Investigations, Protective Services, Custody, Transport, HR, Finance and ICT. In 2020/21, £20 million was saved due to the collaboration for Suffolk.

=== 7 Force / Eastern Region Collaboration ===
The 7 Force Collaboration Programme includes Bedfordshire, Cambridgeshire, Hertfordshire, Norfolk, Suffolk, Essex and Kent police forces. This strategic collaboration programme was established in 2015 to develop and implement successful collaborative solutions to protect the frontline local delivery of policing. It collaborates on areas including Procurement, Training, Firearms, Driver Management, Digital Assets, Vetting and Forensics, along with ERSOU.

=== Suffolk Fire and Rescue Service ===
The police and Suffolk Fire & Rescue share a number of joint stations, allowing for closer collaboration between the services. A number of the joint stations are also host to the East of England Ambulance Service.

== Fast Justice (TV documentary series) ==
Suffolk Constabulary Ford Kuga

In 2020, Suffolk's Sentinel Teams were at the focus of a ten part television series which aired on Dave. The Sentinel teams use state of the art Automatic Number Plate Recognition technology which provides instant access to a network of cameras across the country, and they drive high performance, customised BMW vehicles. The Sentinel teams provide enhanced coverage of Suffolk's road network to proactively disrupt serious and organised criminal activity as well as to increase police visibility. Sentinel officers also support the force's response policing and Safer Neighbourhood Teams, and offer additional operational options, making use of a wide range of proactive policing tactics and technology.

== Notable investigations ==
Suffolk Constabulary gained widespread attention in December 2006, when it began to investigate the murder of five women working as prostitutes in the Ipswich area. The murders generated media interest both nationally and internationally. The inquiry was the largest mounted by Suffolk Police in its history.

The disappearance of Corrie McKeague launched another unusually large investigation, involving officers from other constabularies and civilian volunteers.

== Governance and budget ==
Since 2012, the force has been overseen by Tim Passmore (Conservative) who is the Suffolk Police and Crime Commissioner. Since 2022, the chief constable is Rachel Kearton.

Suffolk Constabulary's budget for 2023/2024 is £157 million, with £88 million being government funded and £69 million precept (council tax) funded).

== See also ==
- Policing in the United Kingdom
