= Crowfield, Suffolk =

Village in Suffolk, England

Coordinates: 52.178°N 1.141°E

Crowfield
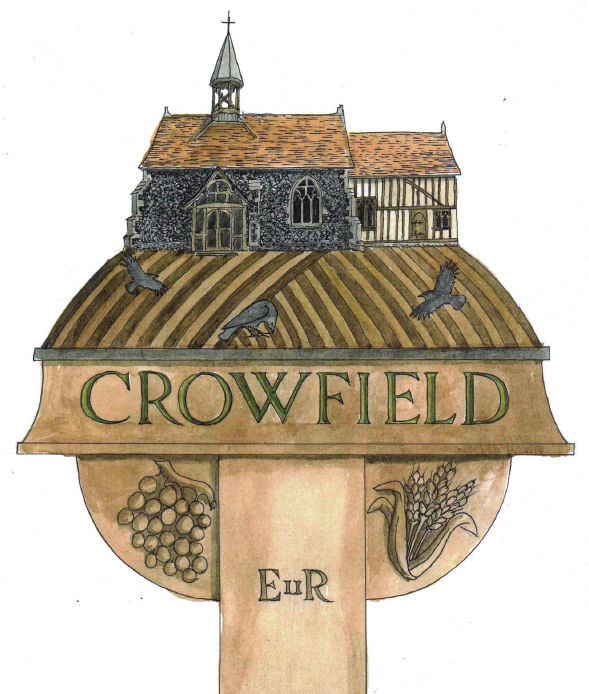
- Crowfield village sign

- Location within Suffolk
- Population: 361 (2011)
- District: Mid Suffolk
- Shire county: Suffolk
- Region: East
- Country: England
- Sovereign state: United Kingdom
- Post town: Ipswich
- Postcode district: IP6
- Dialling code: 01449

Crowfield is a village in Suffolk, England. It is in Helmingham and Coddenham ward in the Mid Suffolk local authority, in the East of England region.

== Crowfield village ==
Crowfield is about 9 miles (14 km) NNW from Ipswich, the county town of Suffolk. In 2012, the village was estimated to have around 200 households.

It is believed that Crowfield was established in Saxon times, not far from where All Saints' Church now stands. The settlement was recorded in Old English as Groffeud or Groffeld, implying that it was just a croft-field (a small enclosure). Its written form began to change to what it is now following the Norman Conquest of England that began in 1066. In the Domesday Book of 1086, or more accurately in East Anglia, 'Little Domesday', Crowfield was recorded in Latin as Crofelda. In later records we find this has become Crofield and although it is not clear when the 'w' was first added, the parish register of 1784 records the 'Hamlet of Crowfield'.

In his book The Place Names of Suffolk (1912), Walter William Skeat writes: "The name has been modified, and its original sense was other than it seems to be. Spelt Groffeud (for Crojfeld), Copinger also records the forms Groffeld and Croftfield. All of these suggest an Anglo Saxon form croft-feld, with the sense of 'croft-field'; i.e. a small enclosure."

At some point in its history, Crowfield had begun to grow along Stone Street, the Roman road that linked Coddenham to Peasenhall, and it is along this old Roman road that the majority of present-day dwellings in the parish are located. As a result, the church now seems isolated from the village as there is only a single dwelling remaining where the village began. However, examination of old maps showing paths and tracks as opposed to modern roads, show that the church is not that far from where people were living.

Politically, Crowfield Parish is in the Helmingham and Coddenham Ward, which lies in the District of Mid Suffolk. Nationally, Crowfield lies in the Central Suffolk and North Ipswich (UK Parliament constituency)

Ecclesiastically, the parish of Crowfield is in the Coddenham Benefice in Bosmere Deanery of the Diocese of St Edmundsbury and Ipswich. Bosmere originally "Bosa's mere", is a small lake near Needham Market in the grounds of Bosmere Hall.

=== Village sign ===
In 2012, the villagers of Crowfield decided to erect a village sign in order that Crowfield could join the list of over 350 Suffolk places with an ornamental sign. It was decided that the sign should follow tradition and include a significant feature to be found within the village and include elements of things associated with Crowfield. The design therefore depicts All Saints' Church surrounded by arable fields, with motifs representing grapes and wheat, a windmill and a cart wheel. 'ER II 2012' is carved into the post to commemorate the Diamond Jubilee of Queen Elizabeth II in 2012. Following a period of fundraising to pay for it, the sign was erected and unveiled on 1 February 2014.

=== Horswold ===
Little Domesday also mentions a place called Horswold. It has since disappeared however, almost certainly followed a modern footpath towards Gosbeck woods and then follows onto a farm inside of Gosbeck according to maps spanning up to 1946, and this would put Horswold within the present-day parish boundary of Crowfield. As "wold" is an Old English term for a forest or an area of woodland on high ground, this is quite plausible as Gosbeck Wood is on ground that is higher than its surroundings. Horswold is described as being in the Bosmere Hundred, with a total population of one household consisting of one 'free-man'. It would have been quite meagre as the tax assessed was 0.4 geld units.

== All Saints Church ==
Crowfield, All Saints is a Church of England church in the Deanery of Bosmere, which is in the diocese of St Edmundsbury and Ipswich. Although once a Chapel of Ease to St Marys, Coddenham, it is independent and has its own parochial church council. The living used to be in the gift of Sir William Middleton. Lying away from the present-day village centre, the church remains an important symbol to the village of Crowfield.

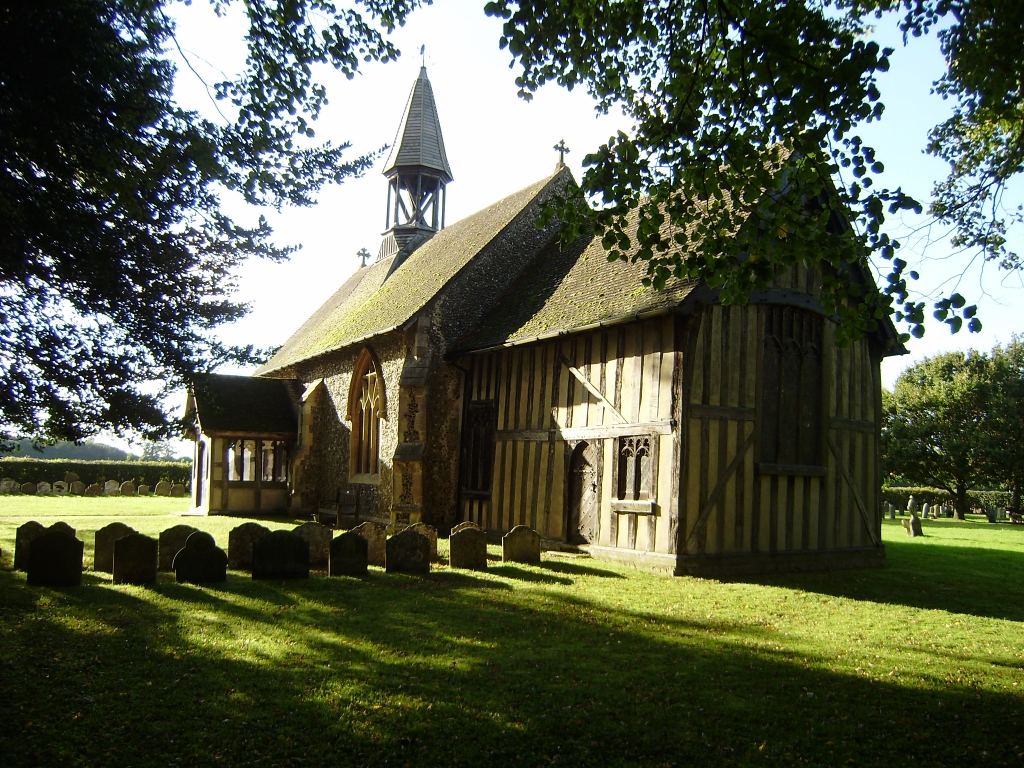
All Saints Church

The church, and its curtilage, are listed in the National Heritage List for England, list entry number 1181164, Grade II*.

== Location ==
The church is located at National Grid Reference: TM 142578, outside of the present-day centre of Crowfield village, near the junction of Church Road, Crowfield Road and Spring Lane. From the road junction, the church can be found at the end of a 100m cart track. Access by foot or bicycle is straightforward but there is limited access for motor vehicles.

To reach the church by road, follow Church Road from Crowfield village, Crowfield Road from Stonham Aspal, or Spring Lane from Coddenham. The church is not on any public transport route.

== History ==
=== 15th century ===
It is known that there has been a place of worship on this site for 600 years, and that the building retains its Norman footprint of a nave and chancel, with the porch and bell turret added later. No medieval records relating to the fabric of the building have been discovered, but there are references to furnishings: 'Our Ladies light', 1447–1511; replacing the Tabernacle of Our Lady in 1464; making a panel for the screen or reredos (an altar piece) in 1451.

The south porch dates from the 15th century. It is timber framed and a masterpiece of medieval carpentry. Inside, the porch is spanned by fine arch-braces, the spandrels of which are beautifully carved with foliage, faces, flowers, wheels and other motifs which merit close scrutiny. These arch-braces and the cornices and other woodwork are beautifully pierced and carved. The inner entrance arch has been renewed and its hood-mould rests on corbels depicting the three mitres of the Diocese of Norwich and a bishop. The closing ring and iron on the door are medieval but the door itself is not.

Crowfield parish register entries date back to 1543, but at that time Crowfield did not have its own register. Baptisms, marriages and burials were recorded in the Coddenham register until the 18th century when Crowfield was given its own register.

=== 16th century ===
In the preceding centuries, not only had much of the church's medieval beauty been lost, the church was almost lost entirely.

At the Reformation its continued existence was in question. William Kene, yeoman, in 1549 bequeathed £4 'to maintain God's service, to be paid £1 a year, if so be that the chapel do continue; if not I Will it shall be given in deeds of charity to the poor'. It appears that the chapel did not continue, as in 1674 when Daniel Browninge, a merchant of London, purchased the deed of the Crowfield estate, Crowfield Chapel was described as 'much decayed and ruined'.

=== 17th century ===
To the left of the track towards the church is a moat. This enclosed the first manor house of the manor of Crowfield-cum-Bocking. However, by 1673 the Lord of the Manor had relocated himself to Bocking Hall, about half a mile south west of the church, and renamed it Crowfield Hall. The first hall was reduced to the status of a farmhouse and eventually it was demolished. An archaeological excavation on the island in 2008, revealed ‘building foundations, together with 12th- to 14th-century pottery with a few sherds perhaps slightly earlier and later.’

During the 1670s and 1680s a bitter and protracted dispute was kept up between the inhabitants of Crowfield and the vicar and parish officers of Coddenham, concerning the provision to be made for services at All Saints', the chapel of ease in Crowfield. For some years the Crowfield people attended Coddenham church. But when the Bishop of Norwich, Anthony Sparrow, conducted his visitation in 1676, he ordered the inhabitants of Crowfield to repair the chapel and provide it with suitable ornaments. They were unwilling to carry out the work without an undertaking from William Smith, the vicar of Coddenham, and Sir Nicholas Bacon, the patron that services would once again be held there. The undertaking was given, and accordingly £60 was spent on restoring and equipping the chapel. On 16 September 1678 the inhabitants petitioned the Bishop to order the resumption of services. This was not the end of the matter though, and the discord continued for a decade.

=== 18th century ===
Little is known about the history of All Saints at this time. The introduction to the Diaries of John Longe, Vicar of Coddenham 1797–1833, contains the words, "The more isolated hamlet of Crowfield had a reputation of being backward and lawless", but gives no reason why it had earned this reputation. The second Crowfield Hall was rebuilt in 1728 but less than one hundred years later in 1819 it too was demolished.

=== 19th century ===
In 1804, the local MP, William Fowle Middleton, was made a baronet, and took Crowfield as his title. The Middletons held the patronage of the parish church.

In 1862 an extensive restoration of the church took place at the behest of Lady Middleton, in memory of her husband Sir William Fowle Middleton who had died in 1860. What you see today is the result of that extensive restoration. Upon its completion the Ipswich Journal commented that 'This is undoubtedly the most costly and choice piece of church restoration that has come to our notice for many years and the chapel is now a perfect model of chaste and elaborate design and finish.'

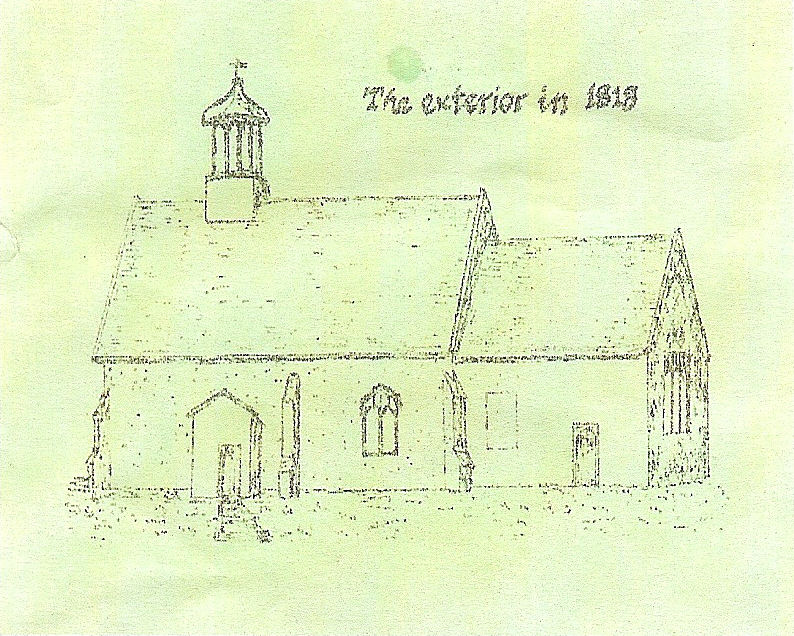
The Church prior to the 1862 restoration

We are given a snapshot of the state of the church prior to the restoration from the notes of David Elisha Davy. When he visited in 1824, the state of the church in the early 19th century is described the notes of the ecclesiologist David Elisha Davy. Visiting in 1824, he recorded that both roofs were hidden by plaster ceilings; there were uniform box pews throughout; the pulpit was painted white, and the small font had a square bowl. The single bell hung not in the cupola but in the wooden porch, which was plastered over. Several of the chancel windows were blocked up. The architect for the restoration was Edmund Charles Hakewill, who had designed two churches in East London, before moving to Suffolk. The contractors appointed for the work at Crowfield were Mr Gibbons and Mr English; both local firms. The woodcarving inside the church was executed by Mr James Wormald and Mr William Polly. The nave was rebuilt in 1862 from the foundations up using the original plan, materials and style. The large three-light windows added at that time are supported inside by double trefoil arches springing from a central shaft. Two grotesques, one human head, one animal found elsewhere in the church were placed in the external western wall level with the gable ends. The south door gives access to an interior which is clean, polished and lovingly tended. Colour has been judiciously used in its beautification and the general atmosphere is one of homeliness. Most of the furnishings were made in 1862 but everything is very tasteful and no amount of care or expense has been spared on the quality of the craftsmanship. In the wall beside the south entrance is a renewed niche for the Holy Water stoop. By the time of Davy's visit in 1824, the original bell turret had been replaced by a cupola with a domed top as can be seen in Isaac Johnson's drawing of 1818. Hakewill replaced this with a new bell turret, crowned with a spirelet. This contains a bell made by Taylor and Sons of Loughborough in 1848. The 15th century chancel, which is of timber-framed construction, is unique in Suffolk churches and extremely rare in churches of eastern England. The windows are attractive examples of Perpendicular architecture. They have timber frames, mullions and tracery. However, the exact history of the chancel is unclear. One account of the 1862 restoration says that the plaster was removed from the chancel walls, revealing for the first time in many years, the lovely windows. Whereas the English Heritage Listed Buildings record from 1955 says, 'The structure was entirely reassembled and many components renewed, in 1862'. The second of these descriptions seems likely as it is clear that when viewing the chancel from the outside, there is much newer timber mixed with the old. The north doorway of the nave leads to the vestry. It retains much of its original 15th-century stonework and hood mould although the corbel heads and part of the arch were renewed during the 1862 restoration. The nave is fitted with beautiful 19th-century benches. These have poppy-head ends on which an incredible variety of fruit and foliage has been carved. Each pew is different and if time allows, it is interesting to try to identify them all. The octagonal font dates from 1862 and has a simple undulating cusped motif around the bowl. The crowning glory of the nave is its magnificent late 15th-century single hammer-beam roof. The hammer-beams alternate with arch-braces and the wall plates are beautifully carved. The construction of this roof is unusual because the arch-braces are built in two stages. Another example of this kind of construction can be seen at Ufford. The restorers gave the roof its angels and standing figures. At the division between the nave and chancel are two very striking clusters of angels, carved in wood. These date from 1862, as do those at the ends of the stalls in the chancel. The chancel arch is 15th century and its responds have moulded capitals and bases. It still retains the places where the former rood screen or possibly rood-beam was attached. This screen, which was sadly destroyed centuries ago, was said to have been very fine. The interior of this remarkable chancel is as interesting and attractive as its exterior. The medieval timber frame is exposed internally and the lower parts of the walls are wainscoted. Its ancient roof has large tie-beams and rough arch-braces. On the south wall hangs a framed funerary hatchment of a member of the Middleton family. Hatchments were placed outside the house of the deceased for a time then taken for permanent display in the parish church. The communion rail dates from the 18th century and the present altar table came from the now redundant St. Andrews church, Mickfield, in 1985. On the east wall are fixed zinc plaques denoting the Lord's Prayer, the Creed and the Commandments. These are very finely painted and were the subject of some light restoration in 2004. The stained glass is by Hughes of London. The east windows were given in memory of Sir William Fowle Middleton by his widow. Other members of the family, who are buried in a vault beneath the altar, are commemorated by brass plaques on the chancel walls. Sir William also has a fine monument on the north wall, given by his tenants. In the chancel floor, under the mat, are two black ledger slabs. One commemorates Sir Henry Harwood of Crowfield Hall, who died in 1738. The other which has a Latin inscription, commemorates Sir Harbottle Wingfield, who died in 1645. There are two other slabs in the chancel floor. One on the north side commemorates William Springfield and the other, which is opposite, has its inscription hidden by the wooden floor.

=== 20th century ===
Crowfield continued to be a 'Hamlet of Coddenham' right up until the early part of the twentieth century. Crowfield became a parish in its own right following a petition to King George V and formal separation in 1923.

The simple single manual organ was built by Norman and Beard in 1913.

The spirelet was subject to some remodelling as part of a 'light refurbishment' in 2004 as it was considered to be of 'stumpy appearance'.

The village of Crowfield is proud of All Saints Church and its unique timber-frame chancel. So much so that the church was chosen as the main feature for the village sign which was commissioned in celebration of the Diamond Jubilee of HM Queen Elizabeth II in 2012. Unveiled on 1 February 2014, the village sign also carries a number of motifs copied from the wooden carvings and the stained glass windows of the church.

=== 21st century ===
On 16 January 2017 a police blockade begun, due to concerns for a man who was holed up in his home, possibly with a weapon. A large amount of Stone Street was cordoned off, and armoured vehicles, police dogs and armed police were brought to the street.

== Parish register ==
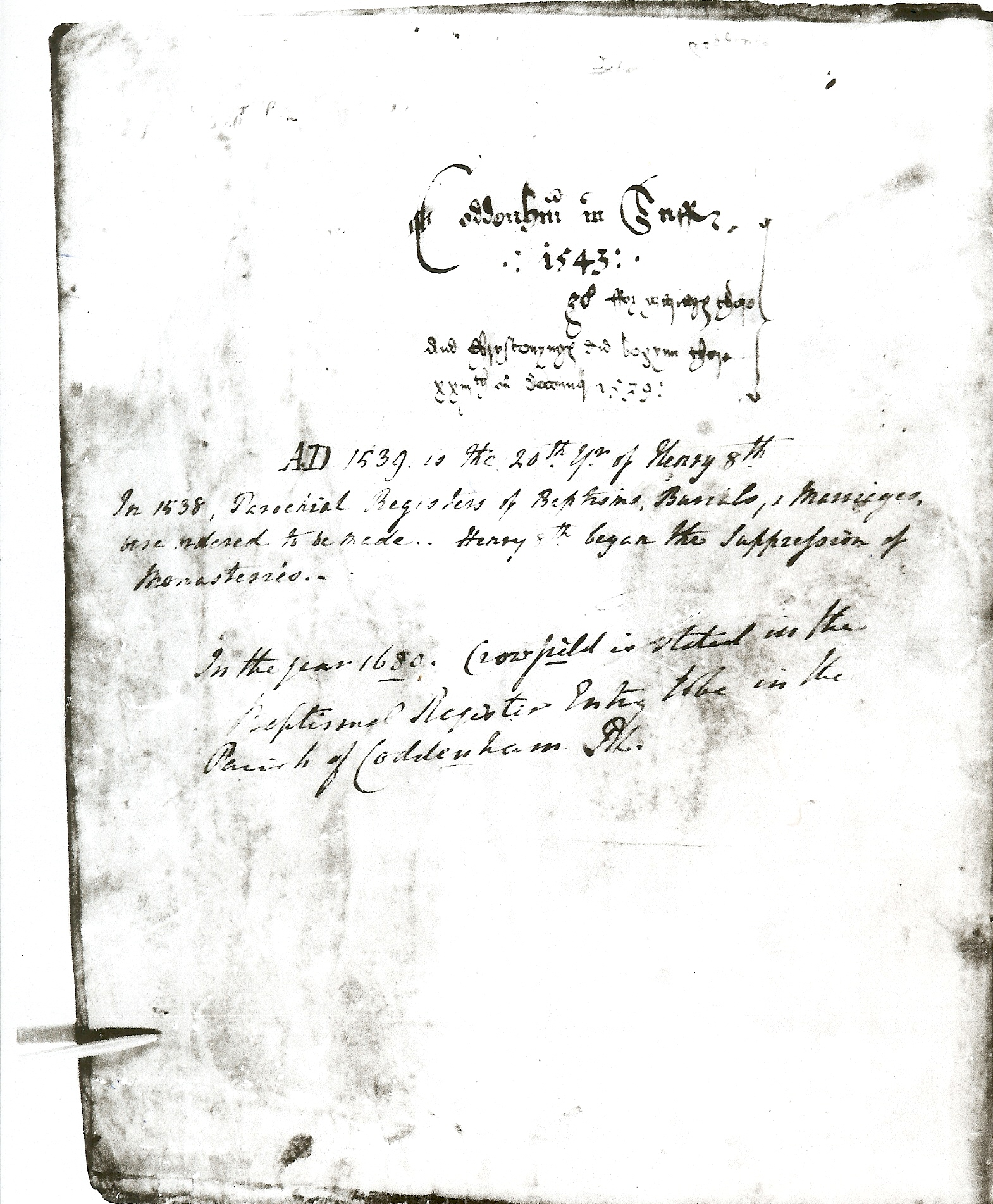
The cover of the 1543 Coddenham parish register

The parish register began in England in 1538 when Thomas Cromwell, Henry VIII's Vicar General, ordered that each parish priest must keep a book, and that the Parson, in the presence of the wardens, must enter all the baptisms, marriages and burials of the previous week. Many parishes ignored this order, so it was repeated in 1547. From 1539 to 1755, Crowfield did not have its own parish register. Births, marriages and deaths in the village were recorded in the Coddenham Register. From 1756, Crowfield was given its own register.

The cover of the first parish register for Coddenham (pictured) is dated 1543, suggesting that Coddenham was one of the parishes that ignored the order of 1539.

== Crowfield Windmill ==
Crowfield Windmill is disused. It is located on land adjacent to the village hall recreation ground. The Windmill was originally built as a drainage mill near Great Yarmouth. It was moved to Crowfield c. 1840 and converted to a corn mill. The mill worked by wind until 1916. An auxiliary engine was used to power the millstones until the mid-1930s.

== Crowfield Airfield ==
Crowfield Airfield is a small airfield with a grass runway lying between Crowfield and Coddenham Green.
