= Elizabeth Keir =

Scottish author (1747–1834)

- Born: October 16, 1746; Edinburgh
- Died: November 3, 1834; Edinburgh
- Occupations: Poet, novelist
- Father: James Rae

Elizabeth Rae Keir (16 October 1746 – 3 November 1834) was a Scottish novelist and poet. One of the few 18th century Scottish female novelists, she published two novels in the 1780s. Her over 400 unpublished poems represent the perhaps the largest body of work from a Scottish female poet of the time.

Elizabeth Rae was born in Edinburgh, Scotland, one of five children of Dr. James Rae, a surgeon, and Isabella Cant. In 1779, she married Dr. William Keir, who attended medical school in Edinburgh and received a position at St. Thomas' Hospital in London. They had three children before he died in 1783.

She returned with her children to Edinburgh and turned to writing for financial support. She published two epistolary novels in the 1780s: .Interesting Memoirs (1785) and History of Miss Greville (1787). Both were published anonymously, the first as "By a Lady" and the second as "By the Author of Interesting Memoirs." Some scholars have suggested that the lack of success of her first novel forced her to subsidize the publication of her second. However, Interesting Memoirs was translated into French and republished in America and Miss Greville was translated into German and republished in Ireland. Reportedly, her income from both novels reached hundreds of pounds a year. Well reviewed at the time, today critics consider her novels sentimental, didactic, and moralistic.

Keir wrote over 420 poems that are preserved in two bound volumes of nearly 900 pages at the National Library of Scotland. Her poems circulated privately amongst her social circles and range in topic from the playful to the deeply personal, such as the death of her husband. Only one of her poems appears to have been published in her lifetime, as a fourteen-page pamphlet called To the Right Honourable, Lady Perth, on the much lamented death of her only son: aged seven years and ten months (1799). Another poem written for Sir Walter Scott was published in an 1837 biography of the novelist, but misattributed to another person and not properly identified until 2017.

Keir died on 3 November 1834 and is buried in Greyfriars Kirkyard.

== Bibliography ==
- Interesting Memoirs, 2 volumes. London: A. Strahan and T. Cadell; Edinburgh: J. Balfour and W. Creech, 1785.
- The History of Miss Greville, 3 volumes. Edinburgh: Balfour and Creech; London: Cadell, 1787.
- To the Right Honourable, Lady Perth, on the much lamented death of her only son: aged seven years and ten months, 1799.
