= Staffordshire Police =

British Home Office Constabulary

Agency overview
- Formed: 1 January 1968; 58 years ago

Jurisdictional structure
- Operations jurisdiction: Staffordshire, UK
- Map of Staffordshire Police's jurisdiction
- Area: 2,713 square kilometres (1,047 sq mi)
- Population: approx. 1,062,500
- Constituting instrument: Police Act 1996
- General nature: Local civilian police

Operational structure
- Overseen by: His Majesty's Inspectorate of Constabulary and Fire & Rescue Services; Independent Office for Police Conduct
- Headquarters: Stafford
- Sworn members: 1,829 (of which 120 are special constables)
- Police, fire and crime commissioner responsible: Ben Adams
- Agency executive: Becky Riggs (Acting), Chief constable
- Divisions: Area: Trent Valley; Chase; North Staffs; Stoke-On-Trent

Facilities
- Stations: 19

Website
- www.staffordshire.police.uk

Staffordshire Police is the territorial police force responsible for policing the ceremonial county of Staffordshire in the West Midlands of England. It is made up of 11 local policing teams, whose boundaries are matched to the nine local authorities within Staffordshire.

== History ==
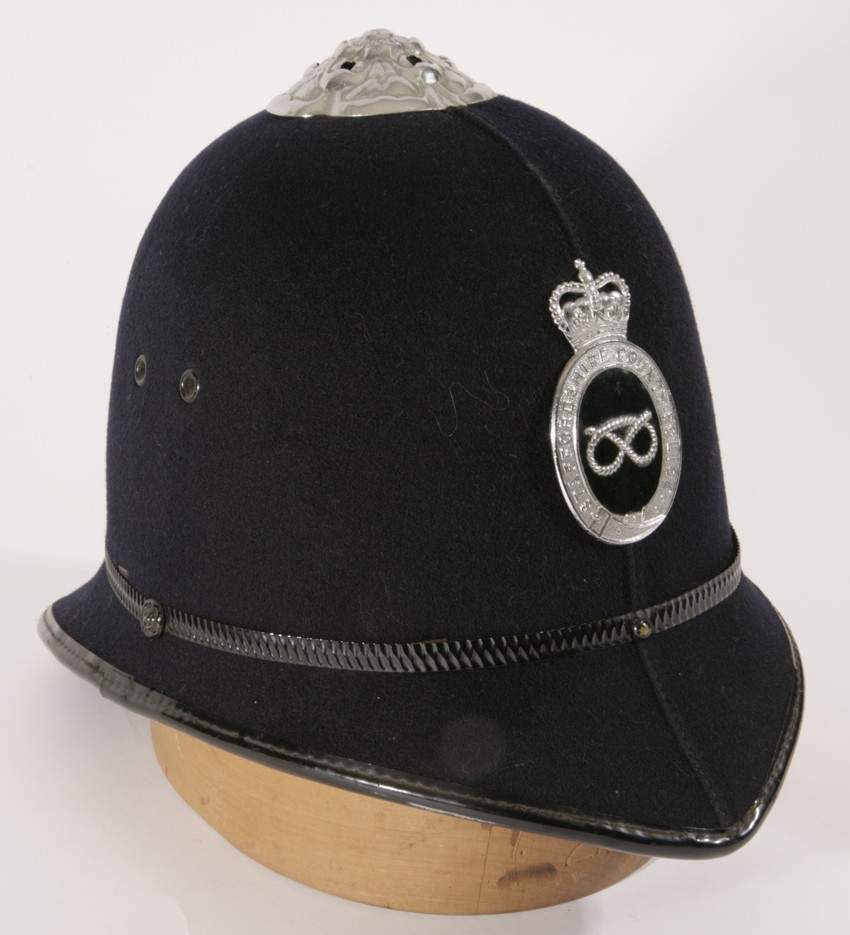
Pre-1968 Staffordshire police helmet, in the collection of Staffordshire County Museum

A combined force covering Staffordshire and Stoke-on-Trent, called Staffordshire County and Stoke-on-Trent Constabulary, was established on 1 January 1968, as a merger of the Staffordshire County Police and Stoke-on-Trent City Police. This force lost areas to the new West Midlands Police in 1974 under the Local Government Act 1972 and adopted a shorter name.

Under proposals made by the Home Secretary on 6 February 2006, it would have merged with Warwickshire Constabulary, West Mercia Constabulary and West Midlands Police to form a single strategic force for the West Midlands region. However these plans have not been taken forward largely due to public opposition.

For 2005/06 Staffordshire police topped the Home Office chart as being the best performing police force in England and Wales, although in assessments since 2020 it has slipped into the bottom half of police forces in terms of performance. In 2022, it was put into "special measures" and in 2025 Chief Constable Chris Noble was suspended pending several investigations by the IOPC into alleged misconduct. Following a 2 day misconduct hearing in July 2026 he was found to have committed gross misconduct and would have been dismissed had he not resigned the eve of his hearing.

=== Chief constables ===
- 1842–1857: John Hayes Hatton
- 1857–??: Lt-Col Gilbert Hogg
- 1888–1929: George Augustus Anson
- 1929–1951: Colonel Sir Herbert Hunter
- 1951–1960: George William Richard Hearn
- 1960–1964: Stanley Edwards Peck
- 1964–1977: Arthur Rees
- 1977–1996: Charles Henry Kelly
- 1996–2006: John Giffard
- 2006–2007: David Swift
- 2007–2009: Chris Sims
- 2009–2015: Mike Cunningham
- 2015–2017: Jane Sawyers
- 2017–2021: Gareth Morgan
- 2021: Emma Barnett (temporary)
- 2021–2026: Chris Noble (Resigned ahead of misconduct hearing where he would have been dismissed for Gross Misconduct)
- 2025–present: Becky Riggs (acting)

In October 2026, David Gardner, acting chief constable at Warwickshire Police, was named as preferred candidate to take over the chief constable role at Staffordshire Police.

=== Officers killed in the line of duty ===
The Police Roll of Honour Trust and Police Memorial Trust list and commemorate all British police officers killed in the line of duty. Since its establishment in 1984, the Police Memorial Trust has erected 50 memorials nationally to some of those officers.

The following officers of Staffordshire Police are listed by the Trust as having died attempting to prevent, stop or solve a crime, since the turn of the 20th century:

- PC William Ezra Price, 1903 (fatally injured attempting to arrest three men)
- PC Brinley James Booth, 1946 (bludgeoned to death while attempting to arrest a suspect)
- PC John David Taylor, 1986 (pushed out of a building by a suspect)

== Organisation ==
Staffordshire Police operates with the same rank structure as other Home Office forces in Britain.

Great Britain police ranks and insignia
Rank	Chief constable	Deputy chief constable	Assistant chief constable	Chief superintendent	Superintendent	Chief inspector	Inspector	Sergeant	Constable
Epaulette insignia									

Presently, the force operates with a senior leadership team consisting of a chief constable, deputy chief constable, two assistant chief constables and civilian assistant chief officer.

Staffordshire Police has a roads policing unit (RPU) who police the roads across the county, as of 2024 the unit is split into two teams, the Road Crime Team and Road Harm Team, the latter of which focussing on aspects such as traffic enforcement allowing the RCT to focus on a more intelligence-lead role.

Staffordshire Police was one of four forces involved in the Central Motorway Police Group West Midlands Police, West Mercia Police and Warwickshire Police. This unit provided roads policing for the motorway network in the West Midlands (mainly M5, M6 and M42) Warwickshire Police left the alliance in 2007 followed by West Mercia in 2018 leaving just Staffordshire and West Midlands until September 2024 when CMPG was disbanded.

Staffordshire Police had a mounted division until 1999, when it was disbanded as part of cost-saving measures that saw 250 jobs cut from the force. Twelve jobs were lost with the closure of the division and the twelve horses from the division were sold on the private market, saving the force £500,000 per year (equivalent to equivalent to £957,792 in 2025) in costs.

In September 2008, the force announced that it intended to vacate the Cannock Road HQ Site and sell it for housing development, moving HQ staff to Lanchester Court, next to the existing Weston Road premises.

Staffordshire Police Authority, a separate organisation charged with oversight of the force, had 9 councillors (drawn from both Staffordshire County Council and Stoke-on-Trent City Council), 3 justices of the peace, and 5 independent members.

The authority was abolished in November 2012, following the election of the first Staffordshire Police and Crime Commissioner (PCC), Matthew Ellis. The office of the police and crime commissioner and the individual elected is responsible for reducing crime and making the area they represent safer. The PCC decides how much council tax people will pay towards community safety services and policing and is personally accountable for all the public money spent, they are also responsible for communicating and representing public interests in the force area and holding the Chief Constable to account.

In 2021, Ben Adams was elected as the new Police, Fire and Crime commissioner, a role previously expanded to include oversight of Staffordshire Fire and Rescue Service.

== Staffordshire Police Cadets ==
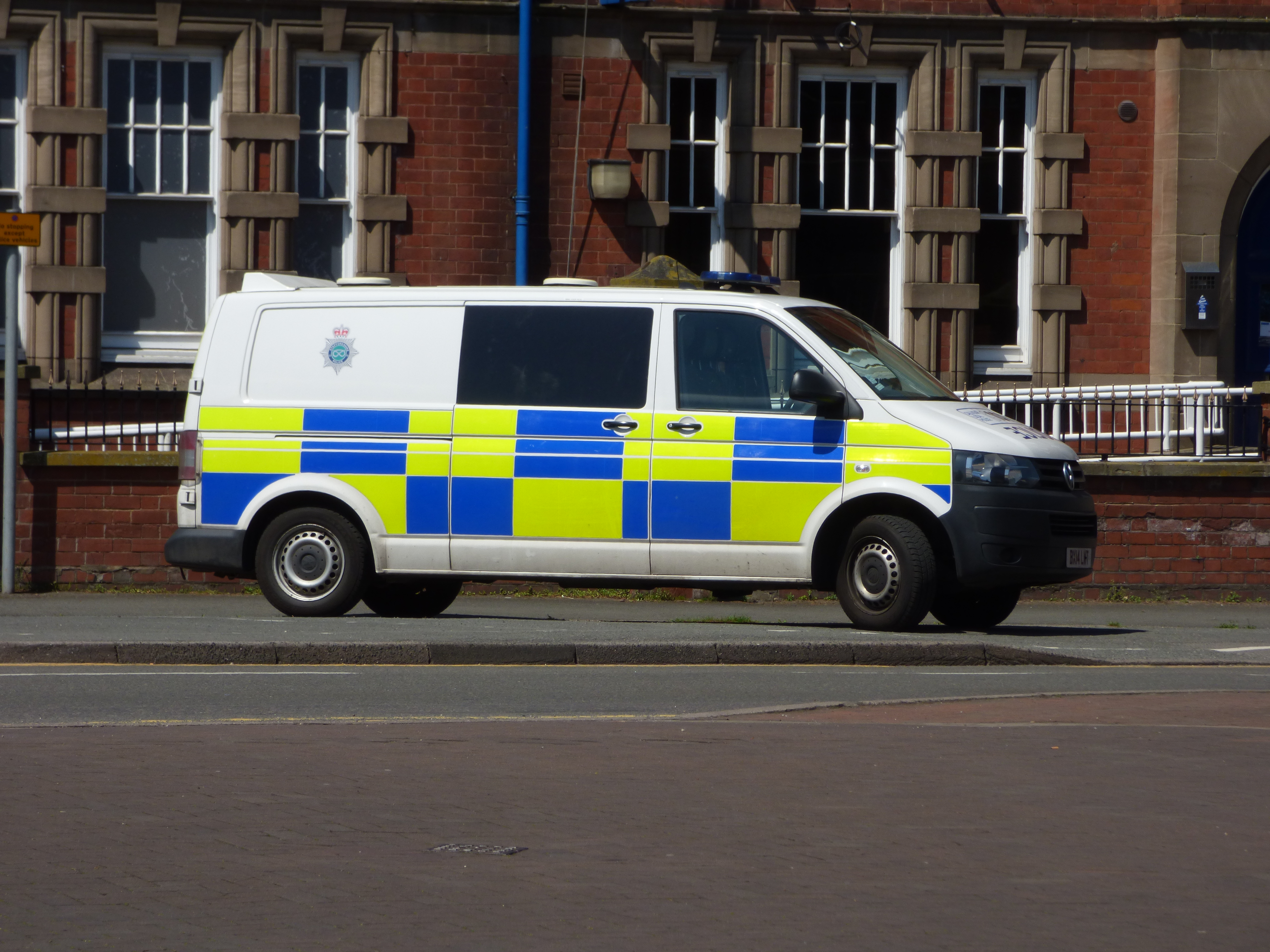
Staffordshire Police van

The Staffordshire Police Cadet scheme aims to strengthen links between the police and young people and promote good citizenship. The programme's chief officer is Chief Superintendent Elliot Sharrad William. The programs deputy chief officer (DCO) is also the DCO of the Special Constabulary; the cadets force also has many special constables, regular police constables and PSV's (police service volunteers) that assist in the running of the units.

The scheme has a ranking system similar to that of the Special Constabulary. This ranking system contains a head cadet, deputy head cadet, section leaders, and then the rank of cadet. There is also a ranking system for the volunteer leaders. This contains a unit commander, deputy unit commander, leaders, young leaders. The rank insignia is the same as the Special Constabulary in the sense of using bars to represent the rank.

== Controversies ==
=== HMICFRS monitoring and performance ===
In 2022, Staffordshire Police was moved into the enhanced monitoring process, known as "Engage" and commonly described as special measures, by His Majesty's Inspectorate of Constabulary and Fire & Rescue Services (HMICFRS). The inspectorate had raised concerns about the force's response to vulnerable people, including failures to consistently identify vulnerability at the first point of contact and concerns about the quality of crime investigations. The force remained in enhanced monitoring until May 2024, when HMICFRS said that sufficient improvements had been made for it to return to routine monitoring.

In its 2025–27 PEEL assessment, HMICFRS again raised concerns about Staffordshire Police's performance. The force was graded "inadequate" for responding to the public and "requires improvement" for investigating crime and for leadership and force management. The assessment found continuing problems with the force's response to calls for service and aspects of crime investigation. Staffordshire Police acknowledged that further improvement was required, while highlighting improvements in safeguarding vulnerable people and neighbourhood policing.

=== Suspension and resignation of Chief Constable Chris Noble ===
In August 2025, Chief Constable Chris Noble was suspended by the Staffordshire Police, Fire and Rescue and Crime Commissioner while allegations concerning his conduct were investigated by the Independent Office for Police Conduct (IOPC). The Commissioner's office said that the suspension was a neutral act and did not indicate guilt. Some of the allegations concerned conduct outside work and pre-dated Noble's appointment as chief constable.

In March 2026, the IOPC announced two further investigations into potential gross misconduct concerning Noble's behaviour while on duty or on police premises. The allegations related to periods during his service with Staffordshire Police and Humberside Police. Noble denied wrongdoing.

On 29 July 2026, media reports announced that Noble had resigned as Chief Constable, hours before the hearings about his gross misconduct charges were due to take place. According to the Daily Telegraph, the allegations included "sharing confidential information without a police purpose."

On 30 July 2026, following a two-day misconduct hearing it was found that Chris Noble committed gross misconduct and would have been dismissed had he not already resigned.

=== Other misconduct and disciplinary cases ===
Recent years have also seen a series of serious misconduct cases involving Staffordshire Police officers. In 2025, former Detective Sergeant Aaron Evans was found to have committed gross misconduct after racist and homophobic material was found on his phone and he remained in a WhatsApp group where such content was routinely shared. Former officer Owen Mills was jailed for two years for corrupt and improper exercise of police powers after developing personal and sexual relationships with a vulnerable woman and a witness he had encountered through his duties.

In 2025, Ryan Dzierzkowski, a response officer in north Staffordshire, was dismissed for gross misconduct and placed on the national College of Policing's Barred List, after he was found to have carried out unauthorised information for personal benefit, abusing his position as a police officer.

In March 2026, PC David Henzell was dismissed without notice after a misconduct panel found that he had sexually harassed a colleague, made inappropriate sexual comments to another colleague and slept while on duty. Three months later, former Sergeant Tim Rees was found to have committed gross misconduct after having a sexual relationship with a student officer on his team; Staffordshire Police's Deputy Chief Constable described abuse of position for a sexual purpose as “a serious form of corruption”.

In July 2026, serving Staffordshire Police officer Alex Trusler pleaded guilty to four counts of sexual assault following an investigation by the force's Anti-Corruption Unit. These cases are separate and do not establish misconduct by Staffordshire Police as an institution. They do, however, form part of the wider recent record against which questions of leadership, supervision and organisational performance at the force may reasonably be considered.

=== Israel arms export protests ===
Staffordshire Police has repeatedly policed protests and direct actions targeting companies in the defence sector over their alleged links to Israel. From 2020 onwards, UAV Engines in Shenstone, a subsidiary of Israeli weapons manufacturer Elbit Systems, was the target of repeated actions by Palestine Action. These included blockades, lock-ons and rooftop occupations, with multiple arrests. In January 2021, eight people were arrested following a three-day occupation of the site, while four further arrests were made outside the factory during a protest in February 2024. Staffordshire Police records also identify a series of protest-related events connected with UAV Engines.

In August 2025, Staffordshire Police responded to a direct action at the Wolverhampton factory of aerospace manufacturer Moog, during which four protesters entered the site and climbed onto the roof. Moog subsequently obtained a High Court injunction restricting protest activity at several of its UK sites. Court documents filed in support of the injunction stated that, following an approach by Declassified UK concerning Moog's alleged links to Israeli military aircraft, Staffordshire Police visited the Wolverhampton site, reviewed protest risks and advised on protest-control measures. Further contacts between the company and police followed before the August action.

Moog's injunction evidence also claimed that one of the Moog 4 protesters had previously been “observed attending PA rallies”, without identifying the source of that information. A subsequent Freedom of Information request asked Staffordshire Police about possible sharing of CCTV, still images or visual identifiers with Moog and the use of facial-matching processes. The force refused to confirm or deny whether such information was held, citing law-enforcement and national-security exemptions.

=== Policing of protests against Reform UK councillors' racist posts ===
In 2025, Staffordshire Council leader Ian Cooper was expelled from his party, Reform UK, over racist posts on social media, and another Reform UK councillor, Peter Mason, was forced to apologise for similar behavior. On 11 December 2025, members of the Staffordshire Campaign against Racism and Fascism protested outside a council meeting, and then sat in the public gallery while Reform UK group refused to answer any questions on the subject. The Reform UK group called Staffordshire Police, who cleared the protesters under threat of arrest.

One of the campaigners, Damon Hoppe, complained to Staffordshire Council's Standards Panel regarding false and misleading statements made by two Reform UK councillors about the protest, and was subsequently arrested by Staffordshire Police and charged with assault. In July 2026, the Crown Prosecution Service dropped the charges. Hoppe described the allegations as false and malicious and called for a public apology from council leader Martin Murray.

== See also ==
- List of law enforcement agencies in the United Kingdom, Crown Dependencies and British Overseas Territories
- Law enforcement in the United Kingdom
