= Claydon and Barham Ward =

Electoral ward of Mid Suffolk, England

The candidate information for the Claydon and Barham Ward in Mid-Suffolk, Suffolk, England. This ward selected two councillors.

== Councillors ==
Election	Member	Party	Member	Party
2011	John Whitehead	Conservative	Martin Redbond	Liberal Democrats
2015	John Whitehead	Conservative	James Caston	Conservative
2019	John Whitehead	Conservative	Tim Passmore	Conservative
2023	John Whitehead	Conservative	David Penny	Green

== 2011 Results ==
Candidate name:	Party:	Votes:	% of votes:
Whitehead, John	Conservative	573	21.12
Redbond, Martin	Liberal Democrat	502	18.50
Britt, Linda	Conservative	469	17.29
Touman, Mohammed	Liberal Democrat	296	10.91
Wilson, Jennifer	Labour	251	9.25
Fairburn, Shirley	Suffolk Together	250	9.21
Wilson, Terry	Labour	233	8.59
Penny, David	Green	139	5.12

== 2015 Results ==
The turnout of the election was 68.98% and the Conservatives won both seats.

Candidate name:	Party name:	Votes:	% of votes:
John WHITEHEAD	Conservative	1330	32.05
James CASTON	Conservative	1213	29.23
Mo TOUMAN	Liberal Democrat	550	13.25
Terry WILSON	Labour Party	515	12.41
David PENNY	Green Party	384	9.25
Jennifer WILSON	Independent	158	3.81

== 2019 Results ==
The turnout of the election was 30.98% and the Conservatives won both seats.

Candidate name:	Party name:	Votes:	% of votes:
John WHITEHEAD	Conservative	749	30.51
Tim Passmore	Conservative	717	29.21
Helen BRIDGEMAN	Green	562	22.89
Mark VALLADARES	Liberal Democrats	427	17.39

== See also ==
- Mid Suffolk local elections
