= Staffordshire Police, Fire and Crime Commissioner =

Elected official in Staffordshire, England

- Incumbent; Ben Adams since 13 May 2021
- Police, fire and crime commissioner of Staffordshire Police and Staffordshire Fire and Rescue Service
- Reports to: Staffordshire electorate
- Appointer: Electorate of Staffordshire
- Term length: Four years
- Constituting instrument: Police Reform and Social Responsibility Act 2011, The Police, Fire and Crime Commissioner for Staffordshire (Fire and Rescue Authority) Order 2018
- Precursor: Staffordshire Police Authority, Stoke-on-Trent and Staffordshire Fire Authority
- Formation: 22 November 2012 (since 1 August 2018 as the Fire Authority)
- Deputy: Deputy Police and Crime Commissioner
- Salary: £81,400
- Website: staffordshire-pfcc.gov.uk

The Staffordshire Police, Fire and Crime Commissioner, formerly the Staffordshire Police and Crime Commissioner is the police, fire and crime commissioner (PFCC), an elected official tasked with setting out the way crime is tackled by Staffordshire Police and the way fire and rescue services are managed by Staffordshire Fire and Rescue Service, in the English county of Staffordshire. The post was created in November 2012, following an election held on 15 November 2012, and replaced the Staffordshire Police Authority. The incumbent, since 2021, is Ben Adams, who represents the Conservative Party.

Matthew Ellis was re-elected to serve another four-year term at the 2016 England and Wales police and crime commissioner elections.

From 1 August 2018, the Staffordshire Police and Crime Commissioner became responsible for the governance of the fire and rescue services within Staffordshire, under the Police, Fire and Crime Commissioner for Staffordshire (Fire and Rescue Authority) Order 2018. The Staffordshire Police and Crime Commissioner is formally known as the Staffordshire Commissioner Fire and Rescue Authority, when exercising powers relating to Staffordshire Fire and Rescue Service.

Matthew Ellis announced in June 2019 that he would not seek re-election at the 2020 England and Wales police and crime commissioner elections.

== List of office holders ==
Name	Political party	From	To
Matthew Ellis	Conservative	22 November 2012	12 May 2021
Ben Adams	Conservative	13 May 2021	Incumbent

== Election results ==
=== 2024 ===
2024 Staffordshire police, fire and crime commissioner election
Party	Candidate	Votes	%	±%
Conservative	Ben Adams	73,500	45.6	−10.1
Labour Co-op	Alastair Watson	70,128	43.5	+16.0
Liberal Democrats	Alec Sandiford	17,666	11.0	+6.6
Turnout		161,294	19.2	
Conservative hold				

=== 2021 ===
2021 Staffordshire police, fire and crime commissioner election
Party	Candidate	Votes	%	±%
Conservative	Benedict Adams	136,024	55.71	+19.45%
Labour	Tony Kearon	67,050	27.46	
Independent	Deneice Florence-Jukes	19,102	7.82	
Liberal Democrats	Richard Whelan	10,690	4.38	
Reform	Michael Riley	5,504	2.25	
Turnout		238,370		
Conservative hold				

=== 2016 ===
2016 Staffordshire Police and Crime Commissioner election
Party	Candidate	1st round		2nd round			1st round votesTransfer votes, 2nd round
Party	Candidate	Total	Of round	Transfers	Total	Of round	1st round votesTransfer votes, 2nd round
Conservative	Matthew Ellis	63,123	36.26%	11,877	75,000	53.0%	
Labour	George Adamson	54,753	31.45%	11,760	66,513	47.0%	
UKIP	Harold Gregory	27,550	15.82%				
Independent	Natalie Devaney	22,155	12.72%				
Green	Paul Woodhead	6,527	3.75%				
Turnout		174,108	21.57%				
Rejected ballots							
Total votes							
Registered electors							
Conservative hold							
