= Ben Adams (police commissioner) =

British police and crime commissioner (born 1965)

Staffordshire Police, Fire and Crime Commissioner
- Incumbent
- Assumed office 13 May 2021
- Preceded by: Matthew Ellis

Personal details
- Born: Benedict Burne Adams; February 1965 (age 61) Sutton Coldfield
- Party: Conservative

Benedict Burne Adams (born February 1965) is a British Conservative Party politician, and the current Staffordshire Police, Fire and Crime Commissioner. He was first elected to the post in May 2021, and re-elected in May 2024.

== Early life and career ==
Adams was born in Sutton Coldfield and left school aged 18 hoping to be a professional golfer, before studying with the Open University and working in information technology.

From 2007, he held local government positions on Lichfield District Council and Staffordshire County Council. He was the Conservative parliamentary candidate for Stoke-on-Trent North at the 2015 and 2017 general elections, coming second to the Labour Party candidate Ruth Smeeth on both occasions.

== Police, Fire and Crime Commissioner ==
Adams was elected to the post of Staffordshire Police, Fire and Crime Commissioner in the 2021 elections, succeeding the previous incumbent Matthew Ellis. In his first speech as commissioner, Adams vowed to put tackling youth knife, drug and gang-related crime high on his agenda. He recommended Chris Noble for the role of Chief Constable at Staffordshire Police and Rob Barber for the post of Chief Fire Officer at Staffordshire Fire and Rescue Service, and their appointments were confirmed later in 2021.

Staffordshire Police was put into special measures by HMICFRS between June 2022 and May 2024. During that period, Adams was criticised for failures by the force with regard to child protection on multiple occasions. He was also criticised over the police force's rise in the number of complaints.

Adams was re-elected in the 2024 elections, with a small majority over the Labour candidate. Before the campaign, pro-Palestinian protesters had been arrested at a fundraising event, with Adams condemning "use of intimidation and abuse, in an attempt to disrupt and undermine the democratic process". The low turnout at the election prompted questions about Adams' mandate and salary.

He represents the Association of Police and Crime Commissioners as a board member on the Fire Standards Board.

== Policies ==
With some police officers and staff having moved to a nearby fire station under the previous PFCC, Adams re-iterated plans to integrate fire and police further.

In 2023, Adams launched a public consultation into increasing the budget for police and fire services.

In 2024, he emphasised organised crime as a priority, advocating significant increases to the money spent on preventative programmes and describing public support for organised crime as 'crucial'.

After electoral defeat for the Conservatives at the 2024 general election, Adams said the party should focus on "traditional Conservative values" and named Kemi Badenoch, Suella Braverman, Tom Tugendhat, Priti Patel, Robert Jenrick and Chris Philp as potential candidates to be the next leader of the party.
