= Middleton baronets of Crowfield (1804) =

Coat of arms of the Middleton baronets of Crowfield

The Middleton baronetcy, of Crowfield, Suffolk, was created in the Baronetage of the United Kingdom on 12 May 1804 for William Middleton, Member of Parliament for Ipswich and Hastings. The title became extinct on the death of the second Baronet in 1860.

== Middleton baronets, of Crowfield (1804) ==
- Sir William Fowle Middleton, 1st Baronet (1748–1829)
- Sir William Fowle Middleton, 2nd Baronet (25 August 1784 – 2 May 1860) of Shrubland Hall

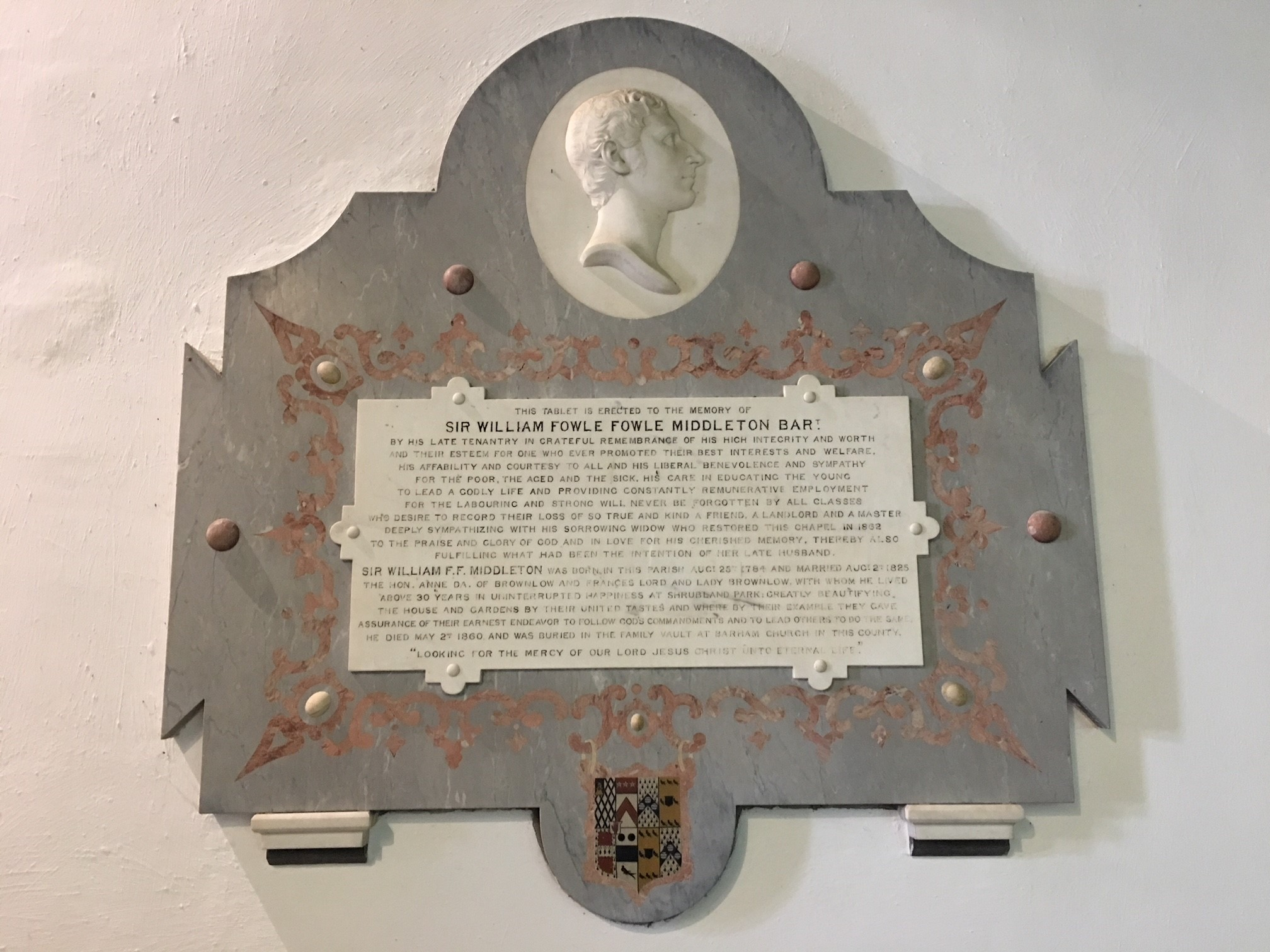
Memorial to Sir William Fowle Middleton, 2nd Baronet, in All Saints' Church, Crowfield, Suffolk

== Notes ==
Baronetage of the United Kingdom
Preceded by Fettes baronets	Middleton baronets of Crowfield; 12 May 1804	Succeeded by Coffin baronets
