= William Fettes =

Scottish businessman and philanthropist (1750 - 1836)

Sir William Fettes
- Born: 25 June 1750
- Died: 27 May 1836 (aged 85)
- Occupation: philanthropist

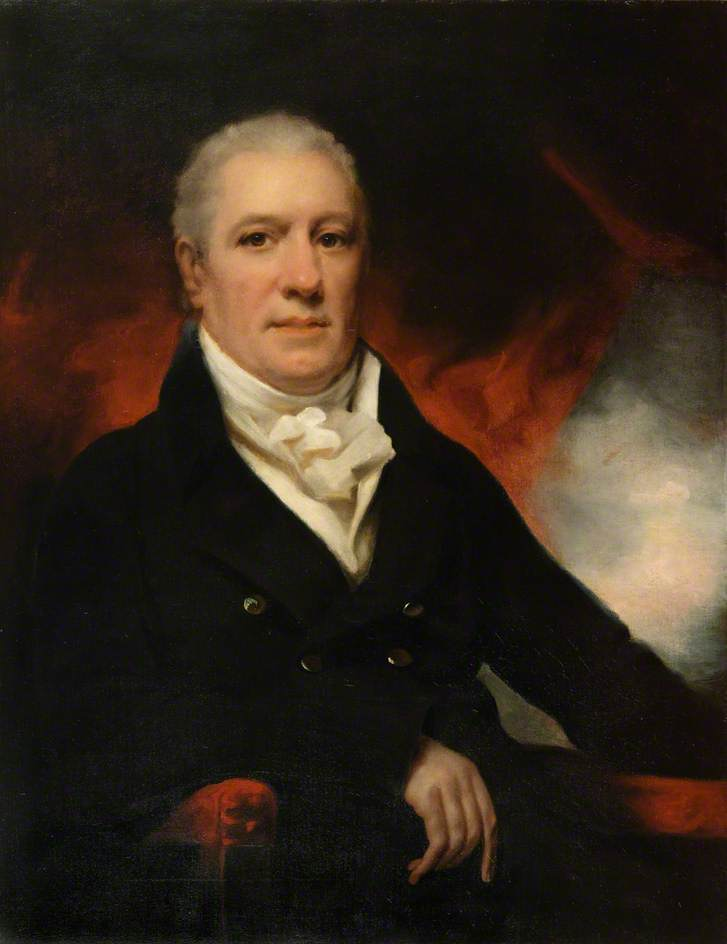
Fettes by William Cuming.

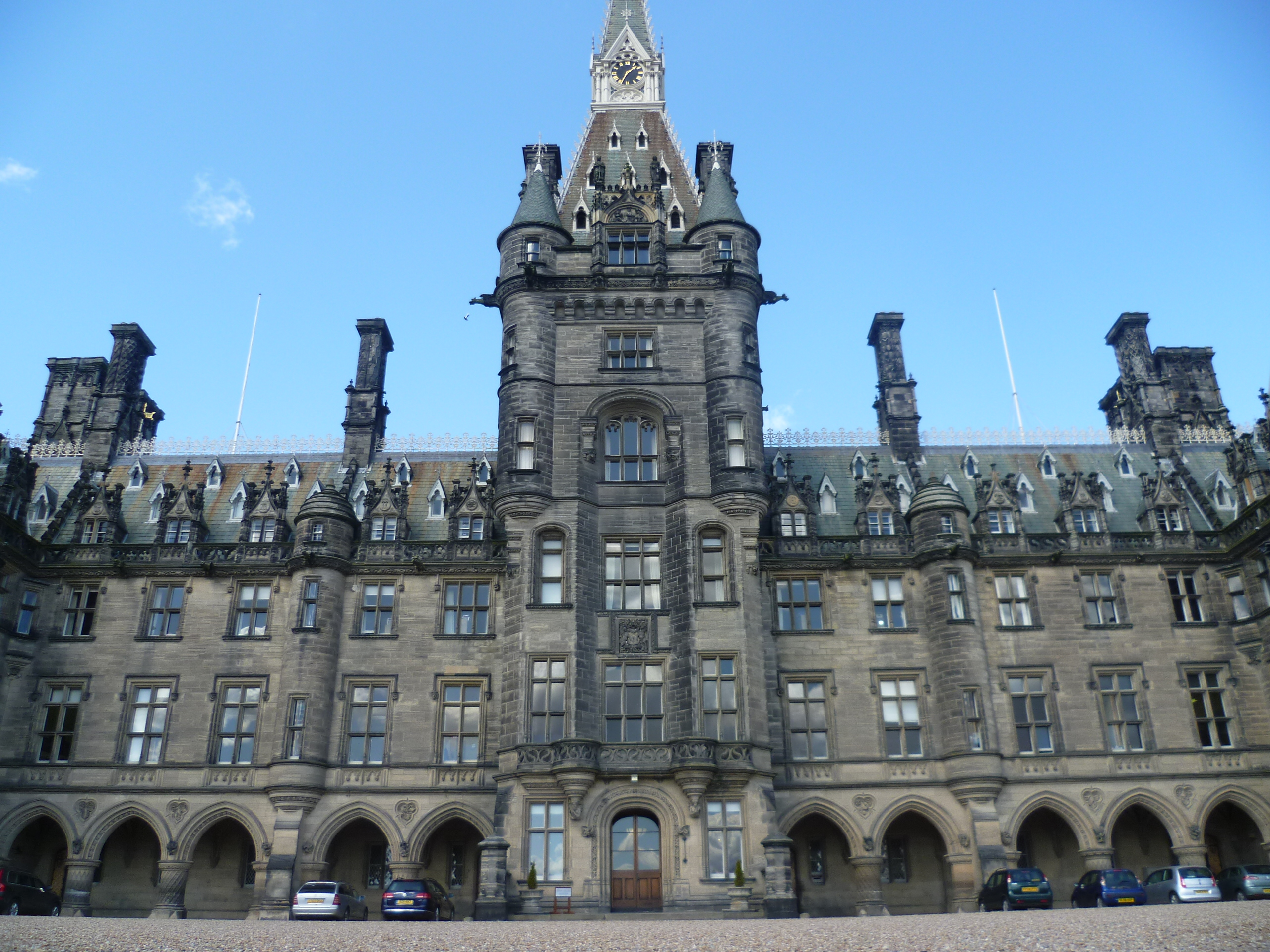
Fettes College, Edinburgh

Sir William Fettes, 1st Baronet (/ˈfɛtɪs/; 25 June 1750 – 27 May 1836) was a wealthy Scottish businessman and philanthropist, who left a bequest which led to the foundation of Fettes College, in Edinburgh.

== Life ==
The Fettes family came from north east Scotland, where the name can be encountered in such variants as "Vettese" (cf. the Scottish writer Raymond Vettese), "Fittes", "Fettis" and "Fiddes".

Fettes was born on 25 June 1750, the eldest son of Margaret, daughter of James Rae, and William Fettes, an Edinburgh merchant. At the age of 8 he attended the Royal High School in Edinburgh. When he was 18 years old he commenced his business life, trading in wine and tea from premises in the High Street. In 1787 he married Maria Malcolm and in 1788 their only son, William Fettes (1788-1815) was born. His life covered a period of economic expansion in Scotland and, at the commencement of the Napoleonic Wars, he was ideally placed to establish connections with Durham, Leeds and Newcastle becoming an underwriter, a military contractor and, in 1800, a director of the British Linen Bank.

A merchant, and underwriter, Fettes lived not far from Fettes College present location on Comely Bank, in the Stockbridge district of Edinburgh. He had made his money trading tea during the Napoleonic Wars, and used this to buy the estate of Comely Bank. He was by then living at Comely Bank in the Stockbridge district of Edinburgh and he had other estates which he had bought but he was to retire from trade in 1800 to look after these interests. He was involved in many public charities and the general welfare of Edinburgh, serving as Lord Provost of Edinburgh from 1804 to 1806 (two elected sessions). He became a baronet of Whamphrey in the County of Dumfries on 13 June 1804.

In 1815, his only son, William Fettes died at the age of 27 of typhoid in Berlin, while on a tour of Europe. He had been admitted to the Faculty of Advocates in 1810 five years previously. Without an heir, Fettes was to live on to May 1836, predeceasing his wife by just three weeks. They are buried together in Canongate Kirkyard on the Royal Mile.

In later life Fettes lived at 13 Charlotte Square and this is where he died.

Fettes had originally intended that money from his estate should pay for a hospital rather than a school but he later decided to make it a school for orphans and the needy. In his will he made a bequest which was to lead to the foundation of Fettes College.

== The Fettes Bequest ==
His bequest, of £166,000, in memory of his only son, was for the endowment of a school for orphaned or needy children, a tradition it still continues through the Fettes Foundation's scholarship and bursary programmes.

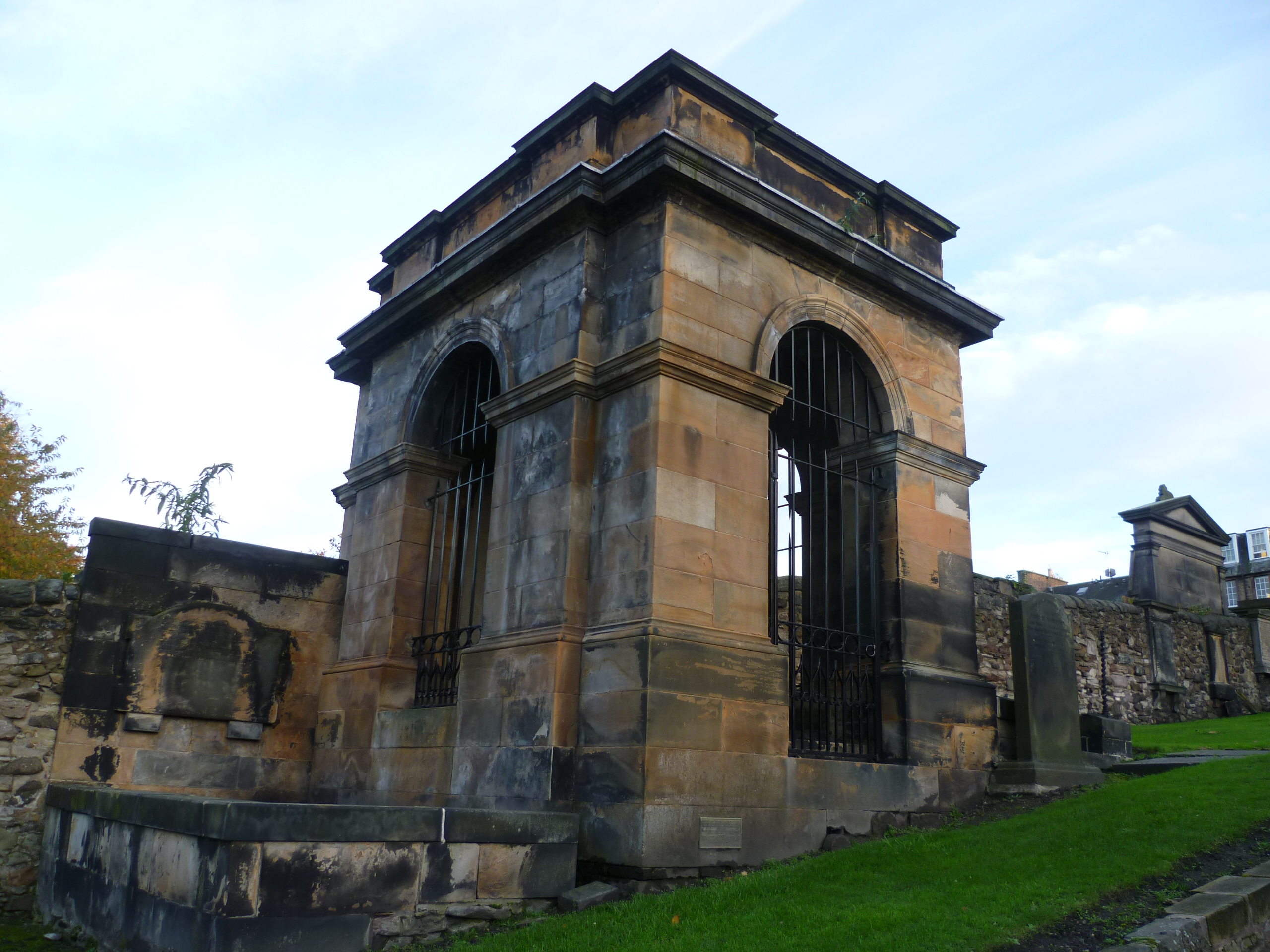
Fettes' Mausoleum in the Canongate Kirkyard, Edinburgh

His will declares:

"It is my intention that the residue of my whole estate should form an endowment for the maintenance, education and outfit of young people whose parents have either died without leaving sufficient funds for that purpose, or who from innocent misfortune during their lives, are unable to give suitable education to their children."

After his death the bequest was effected and invested. His Trustees allowed the investments to accumulate for more than 25 years before they decided that with £166,000, there was enough capital with which to acquire the land, to found the school, and to fund scholarships.

The main school building was designed by David Bryce, nearly 20 years after Fettes’ death, and it opened in 1870, 34 years after his death. Fettes College thus opened with 53 pupils (40 were Foundation Scholars with 11 others boarding and two day pupils). By 1875 200 boys enrolled.

== See also ==
- George Heriot, "Jinglin Geordie", the Edinburgh merchant whose name appears in Heriot-Watt University and George Heriot’s School.
- Collins Encyclopedia of Scotland

Baronetage of the United Kingdom
New creation	Baronet (of Comely Bank); 1804–1836	Extinct
Preceded by Rugge-Price baronets	Fettes baronets of Comely Bank; 12 May 1804	Succeeded by Middleton baronets
