= Suffolk Police and Crime Commissioner =

- Incumbent; Tim Passmore since 22 November 2012
- Police and crime commissioner of Suffolk Police
- Reports to: Suffolk Police and Crime Panel
- Appointer: Electorate of Suffolk
- Term length: Four years
- Constituting instrument: Police Reform and Social Responsibility Act 2011
- Precursor: Suffolk Police Authority
- Inaugural holder: Tim Passmore
- Formation: 22 November 2012
- Deputy: Deputy Police and Crime Commissioner
- Salary: £73,300
- Website: suffolk-pcc.gov.uk

The Suffolk Police and Crime Commissioner is the police and crime commissioner, an elected official tasked with setting out the way crime is tackled by Suffolk Police in the English County of Suffolk. The post was created in November 2012, following an election held on 15 November 2012, and replaced the Suffolk Police Authority. The current incumbent is Tim Passmore, who represents the Conservative Party.

== List of Suffolk Police and Crime Commissioners ==
Name	Political party	Dates in office
Tim Passmore	Conservative Party	22 November 2012 to present
