= Death of Corrie McKeague =

English disappearance case

Corrie McKeague
- Born: 16 September 1993; Perth, Scotland
- Disappeared: 24 September 2016 (aged 23)
- Status: Presumed dead, 22 March 2022
- Occupation: RAF Regiment gunner
- Children: 1 (with April Oliver)
- Parent(s): Nicola Urquhart (mother); Martin McKeague (father)

Corrie McKeague (16 September 1993 – disappeared 24 September 2016) went missing in the early hours of 24 September 2016 in the Bury St Edmunds area of Suffolk, England. Before disappearing, he served as a Royal Air Force Regiment gunner. Despite no remains being found, McKeague was legally declared dead in 2022 after an inquest concluded that he was crushed to death after getting into a commercial waste bin that was then tipped into a bin lorry.

McKeague was last seen, on town centre CCTV footage, entering a cul-de-sac which contained a number of wheelie bins. His mobile phone was tracked by masts along a route between Bury St Edmunds and a landfill site near Barton Mills. Suffolk Constabulary were initially reluctant to search the site for McKeague's remains because a bin lorry that had travelled that route at that time had been estimated to have been carrying a load of only 15 kilograms (33 lb). In March 2017, however, the police discovered that the lorry had a significantly larger weight; more than 100 kilograms (220 lb).

McKeague's disappearance remained under investigation and the case attracted widespread publicity, with the authorities believing that he was crushed to death by the bin lorry and that his remains were somewhere at the Barton Mills landfill site.

Suffolk Constabulary spent more than £2.1 million investigating McKeague's disappearance, making it one of the most expensive missing persons investigations that the force has conducted and, in the words of the police, one that brought unique pressures on the force. The search for McKeague was stood down in March 2018, and an inquest in March 2022 concluded that he had died, after climbing into a commercial waste bin, as a result of "compression asphyxia in association with multiple injuries".

== Life ==
McKeague was born in Perth in September 1993 and was raised in Cupar, Fife, before moving to Dunfermline, Fife, Scotland at the age of nine, following his parents' divorce. McKeague and his two brothers, Darroch and Makeyan, were raised by their mother and attended St Margaret’s Primary School and St Columba's High School in Dunfermline. McKeague joined the RAF Regiment in 2013 and was posted to No. II Squadron Royal Air Force Regiment based at RAF Honington after his initial Regiment training at the same base. McKeague was a Senior Aircraftman gunner and medic on the squadron.

In January 2017, April Oliver, aged 21, announced that she was pregnant with McKeague's baby. Neither she nor McKeague were aware of the pregnancy at the time of his disappearance. They had only been dating for five months. Miss Oliver was on a holiday in the United States when McKeague disappeared, but cut the holiday short to return to the UK. On 18 June 2017, Oliver announced that she had given birth to a daughter, Ellie-Louise, on 11 June 2017.

== Disappearance ==
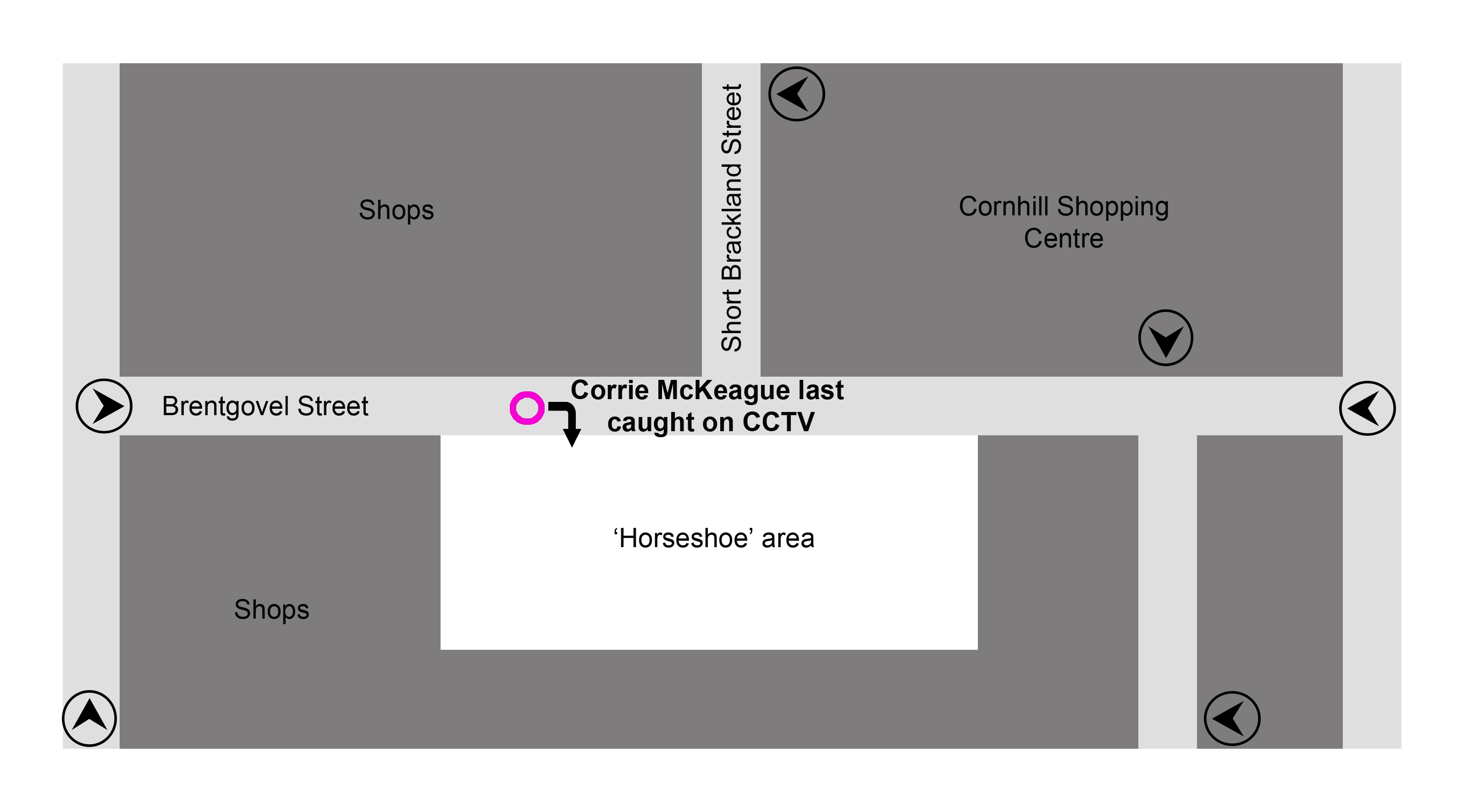
Sketch map of Bury St Edmunds town centre where McKeague disappeared, showing position of CCTV cameras

On the night of 23 September 2016, McKeague was out drinking with friends in Bury St Edmunds. He had driven himself to the town with the intention of leaving his car overnight. He separated from his friends in the early hours of 24 September, after leaving the Flex nightclub on St Andrew's Street South. The doorman at Flex recalls asking McKeague to leave because he was too drunk to stay. He remarked that McKeague was 'no trouble' whatsoever and that they chatted afterwards on the street outside. McKeague was in the Mama Mia's takeaway restaurant, reportedly his usual takeaway restaurant, between 1:15 am and 1:30 am. The last known sighting of McKeague was on CCTV at 3:25 am on Brentgovel Street, walking into the "Horseshoe area" where there were a number of wheelie bins. There was no footage of him ever emerging. CCTV footage also suggested that McKeague had slept briefly in a doorway before waking up and moving on. It is not believed that he intended to walk back to his base, RAF Honington, which is 10 miles (16 km) north east of the town along minor unclassified roads.

Nicola Urquhart, his mother, said in a statement dated 3 October 2016, which was released to the public and reported on by Evening Standard, that her son has never walked back to Honington on any previous occasions, and that leaving on his own, getting food and sleeping for a short time were all things McKeague had done in the past.

As he had the weekend off, McKeague was not reported missing until the 26 September (the following Monday) when he failed to report for work. After he was reported missing, the Suffolk Lowland Search and Rescue team (SULSAR) helped the police search the area around Bury St Edmunds and Honington alongside the RAF's own search and rescue teams which were bolstered by searches involving police helicopters.

There was one unconfirmed sighting of McKeague at the back of a sugar factory at Bury St Edmunds at 4:20 am, but police stressed this had been investigated and the person involved was not McKeague. The last authenticated sighting was on CCTV at Brentgovel Street.

== Investigation ==
=== Early theories ===
On the morning of McKeague's disappearance, his Nokia Lumia mobile phone had moved from Bury St Edmunds to Barton Mills, some 12 miles (19 km) to the north west, along the corridor of the A1101 road. Phone data indicated that this journey took 28 minutes, which meant that it could not have been carried by someone walking on foot. In October, Suffolk Constabulary seized a bin lorry that was said to have contained his mobile but the line of enquiry led to nothing. It was noted that the bin lorry seized was only carrying a weight of 15 kilograms (33 lb) and so could not have been carrying McKeague himself as he weighed around 90 kilograms (200 lb). This led to searches being carried out along the lorry's route between the two towns. The mobile phone was either switched off at 8:00 am, ran out of battery power or was damaged and it was not found.

One focus of the investigation was whether someone had given a lift to McKeague as he was walking back to his base. His mother stated that Corrie would have accepted a lift if offered to him, as he would offer a lift if he was driving and saw someone walking on their own. She also appealed for anyone who might have given him a lift to come forward, even if something untoward had happened. Police believed that McKeague was not in Bury St Edmunds. Superintendent Katie Elliott stated in an interview to Forces TV with Nicola Urquhart that there could have been third party involvement and that the police would not rule anything out.

The investigation also covered parts of the Hollow Road Industrial Estate in Bury St Edmunds and Great Livermere, a small village close to RAF Honington on McKeague's supposed route back to his base. Along with the British Transport Police, the Suffolk Constabulary searched along railway lines in the area and some of the roads were closed to enable thorough searches. In November 2016, a stretch of the eastbound carriageway of the A14 road, was closed between junctions 44 & 45 (Moreton Hall and Rougham) to search for McKeague.

On 10 October, a dismembered and burned body was found in a suitcase off the A628 road near Tintwistle in Derbyshire. Initial investigations led police to state that the body was that of a white man under the age of 50. A DNA analysis, however, later proved negative and Derbyshire Constabulary confirmed that the body was not that of McKeague. The body was later confirmed to be Yang Liu, a 36-year-old financial investor. His acquaintance Ming Jiang was convicted of his murder in May 2017.

=== CCTV evidence and searches ===
In November 2016, it was revealed that in the two hours between 3:00 am and 5:00 am on the morning of 24 September 2016, 39 people could be seen on the same CCTV camera as the last one to record McKeague's last movements. Despite repeated inquiries and appeals, 23 of these people could not be identified. Suffolk Constabulary installed a 'pod' at a Christmas Fair in Bury St Edmunds, between 24 and 25 November 2016, and the public were encouraged to visit the pod to help establish the identities of the 23 people. By 4 December, 13 had been positively identified.

In December 2016, 5 square miles (13 km^{2}) of woodland between Barton Mills and RAF Honington was searched by volunteers and staff from the Suffolk Lowland Search and Rescue Team. The search area, previously not examined, centred on the King's Forest area, with the possibility that McKeague had been hit by a vehicle on his way home. The area was declared officially cleared by the end of 17 December. Urquhart said that she had prepared herself mentally for finding her son's body.

=== Urquhart statement and mobile phone ===
In December 2016, Urquhart publicly went on record as saying that Suffolk Constabulary were not properly investigating her son's disappearance. The appeal fund raised in Corrie's name had attracted funds of more than £50,000 by the end of December 2016 and Urquhart was considering hiring a private investigator to pursue lines of inquiry which she believed the police had failed to follow. Suffolk Constabulary defended their actions stating "We are very focused on finding Corrie. Although it is a missing persons inquiry, we have given it the same resources as a major investigation. We have not ruled out any possibility." Urquhart postponed hiring an investigator after Suffolk Constabulary agreed to investigate an incident where three men had been seen, on 25 September, setting fire to a car. The police later said that there was no link between the car fire and McKeague's disappearance. In the same interview, Urquhart described her son as a "social hand grenade" and that he would have been happy to get into a stranger's car.

In January 2017, the back of a mobile phone was found close to where the last signal from McKeague's phone was detected. However, as the part contained "no essential components", such as a SIM card or any electronic parts, the police said it would be impossible to link it with the disappearance and that no further analysis would be performed. However, police announced they were examining McKeague's activities on swinger websites. His family had provided Suffolk Constabulary with his username for at least one site.

=== Landfill search ===
In February 2017, police started searching the landfill previously identified as being the last place his mobile phone was located when it connected to a tower. This was in the belief that McKeague had slept in a bin in the Horseshoe area and had been crushed to death when the bin lorry collected the contents of the bin and transported them to the landfill site. While Suffolk Police stated that McKeague had gone and slept in a bin in the Horseshoe area, his family said that they did not believe this version of events. They point to the fact that he was proud of his appearance and if necessary, he could have gone and slept in his car which was not very far away.

The search was planned to cover 1,100 square yards (920 m^{2}) to a depth of 25 feet (7.6 m) and was expected to take ten weeks. On 13 February, McKeague's mother announced that a £50,000 reward, offered for information about her son, was to be withdrawn if nobody came forward in the following week. By May 2017, it was revealed that search had cost Suffolk Police £1 million and that it might take longer than the estimated 10 weeks. This makes the case one of the most expensive missing person enquiries that the Suffolk Police have ever dealt with. By May, they had sifted through 3,000 tonnes (3,000 long tons; 3,300 short tons) of waste.

On 1 March, a 26-year-old man was arrested on suspicion of attempting to pervert the course of justice. He was not the driver of the bin lorry nor a relative of McKeague. On 7 March, the suspect was released and the police stated that they believed he had genuinely made a mistake and that the charge had been dropped. In conjunction with this, police revealed that an error had been made in the calculations of the weight of the bin lorry and that it was close to 220 pounds (100 kg). Urquhart stated on Facebook that "This can really, devastatingly, only mean one thing".

On 5 June, it was announced that police were finding "items from the right time" and place of McKeague's disappearance. About 4,430 tonnes of waste had been searched, but a police spokeswoman said: "The work is constantly being reviewed and, as the search team are still finding items from the right time frame that are identifiable as coming from the town, the search will continue on a week by week basis.".

On 21 July 2017, 20 weeks into the landfill search, Detective Superintendent Katie Elliott, of Suffolk Constabulary, announced at a press conference, that the search of the landfill had come to an end with no positive results on McKeague. A human skull was found at the site in April 2017, but was found to be from a female and dated back to before 1945. Police managed to trace the person who had sent it to landfill and they deemed there to be no suspicious circumstances.

Between February and July, the police had sifted through 6,500 tonnes (7,200 tons) of waste at the landfill site. The search will now focus on incinerated waste and the police will also initiate a comprehensive review of the investigation. Nicola Urquhart also publicly acknowledged the possibility that McKeague may never be found but criticised the police's decision to hand the landfill site back to the owners and sought an injunction to prevent the area where his remains are believed to be from being disturbed. Police were criticised for not continuing the search as they had stated that it was not about the money being spent on the landfill dig. A former police officer stated that if it was not about the money, then there was no reason to not go searching. Stuart Hamilton, a forensic pathologist, stated that if McKeague's body had been in the bin lorry and it was crushed, then the rate of decomposition would have been faster than normal for a human body. With the amount of waste on the site cross-contamination from other human DNA was also a strong possibility.

In August 2017, it was revealed that police were also sifting through "incinerated material" that was transferred from the landfill site. Occasionally, waste from the landfill was taken to Red Lodge transfer station and then on to an incinerator at Great Blakenham near Ipswich. Bones that had been found at the incinerator were being investigated, although police said it was more likely that McKeague's body was still at the landfill site. This supposition was later confirmed in the same month when the police announced that the bones were not human.

Also in August 2017, the family reinstated the £50,000 reward for information. The money had been donated by a local businessperson earlier in the investigation, but was withdrawn when the police started searching the landfill site.

=== Release of CCTV images ===
On 21 September 2017, Suffolk Police released four CCTV images of people who they said could have been witnesses to McKeague's disappearance twelve months previously. They also set up a 'pod' in Bury St Edmunds town centre to appeal for information and hopefully engender new lines of enquiry.

=== Second landfill search ===
In October 2017, Suffolk Police announced they would start another search at the landfill site at Milton in Cambridgeshire. It would focus on an area adjacent to the previous search area, but believed to contain waste taken to the site around the time that McKeague disappeared. A review of the investigation into McKeague's disappearance, by a specialist police unit based in the East Midlands, supported Suffolk Police's theory that McKeague had climbed into a bin in the Horseshoe area of Bury St Edmunds and was brought by a bin truck to the landfill site at Milton. Despite this, the police intimated that the search for McKeague at the landfill site would be wound down by Christmas 2017.

Suffolk Police announced on 26 March 2018 that the search for the missing airman would be stood down as there were "no realistic lines of inquiry left". The Suffolk Police Federation noted that the investigation had brought "unique pressures" to the force. The day after, McKeague's mother and brothers appeared on the Victoria Derbyshire show to highlight what they cited as "inconsistencies" with the raw data referring to the weight carried in the bin lorry. McKeague's mother stated that either the data was manipulated or "someone is lying to police".

In April 2018 McKeague's father, Martin, acknowledged that his son was probably dead and that he hoped to hold a memorial service in the summer of 2018, following the police decision to end the investigation. He speculated, in an interview with the UK tabloid Daily Mirror, that his son had killed himself because of the pressures of fatherhood. This was refuted by the rest of the family who explained that the first text notifying McKeague that April Oliver was pregnant did not get sent to his phone until after he had disappeared.

His father later released a statement, on social media, that said McKeague was in the Suffolk waste disposal system somewhere but that "his remains are essentially irretrievable." He acknowledged that his son was prone to sleeping in and on top of bins and that he was in the bin that the truck had delivered to the waste site on the morning of 24 September 2016. At the same time, McKeague's mother stated that she would continue to look for answers, citing the fact that the coroner had not issued a death certificate as he was still presumed missing rather than presumed dead.

== Theories ==
A retired senior Metropolitan Police detective, Colin Sutton, went on record stating that McKeague's disappearance had not been intentional, as making preparations always leaves a digital footprint. Sutton also said that McKeague was shown walking into a cul-de-sac that was blocked off by a high wall and a fence and that there was no CCTV of him leaving it. He doubted whether McKeague would have been aware of where the CCTV cameras were located which, Sutton said, was also indicative of not leaving intentionally. The CCTV cameras, operated by the town council, did not provide 100% coverage. Even after a review of privately operated CCTV recordings, there were no further sightings of McKeague. McKeague's uncle, Tony Wringe, said that the area off Brentgovel Street that McKeague was shown walking into on CCTV, had been physically tested and it was shown to be impossible for him not to have been recorded on CCTV if he had left on foot. Sutton said that his guess was that there was another person, or other people, involved in McKeague's disappearance.

McKeague's job with the RAF was not a contributory factor, according to the lead detective in the investigation. Intended disappearance was also put in doubt by McKeague's happy mood at the time; he was making plans to meet up with his brother, Darroch, on the night that he went missing, with his last text being sent at 03:08 am. He had also booked flights to go home to Dunfermline for Halloween. His mother also pointed out that he loved his dog which he kept at RAF Honington and would not have left it behind intentionally. She has stated that there were three possible scenarios: that he met with an accident and was dead, that he left voluntarily or that a third party was involved. In December 2016, it was revealed that McKeague's bank and social media accounts had not been touched after his disappearance.

Although not openly discussed, some parallels have been drawn between the proximity (37 miles (60 km) away) of McKeague's disappearance to an attempted kidnapping of a serviceman at RAF Marham in July 2016. While kidnapping was one route for the investigation, McKeague's mother, who is a family liaison officer with Police Scotland, said that it was not something that the police were discussing with her. In December 2016, the outgoing Station Commander of RAF Honington, Group Captain Mick Smeath ruled out any link between the attempted abduction at RAF Marham and the disappearance of McKeague.

In November 2016, the family issued a statement on Facebook saying that they were unhappy with the police investigation. McKeague's uncle, Tony Wringe, said that "This is a Major Investigation Team in name not function" [sic]. The family also said that a decision not to search a landfill in the Barton Mills area for McKeague's phone had been wrong.

After the police stopped the landfill search in July 2017, Nicola Urquhart went on record to say that she did not agree with the version of events being put forward by Suffolk Police. They maintain that McKeague slept in a bin, which was then emptied into the truck and he was crushed and then either buried at the landfill or incinerated at Great Blakenham. Nicola Urquhart points out that Corrie had been asleep in the doorway of a shop in Brentgovel Street for nearly two hours. She finds it hard to believe that he would then go and sleep in the bin; she maintains that a third party was involved. She also disputed the evidence about the bin load, which the police had said was an unusual 256 pounds (116 kg), by stating that loads over 220 pounds (100 kg) were not out of the ordinary for that route from the Horseshoe area in Bury St. Edmunds. At the same time, in August 2018, she also maintained that it may have been possible for McKeague to have left the Horseshoe area without being detected by CCTV, when a pivotal part of the enquiry had focused on the belief that it was impossible to have not detected McKeague on CCTV if he had left the area on foot.

As the second anniversary of McKeague's disappearance approached, Nichola Urquhart revealed that the police only had CCTV footage on the Saturday morning up until 12:00 pm. She states that McKeague could have got up from sleeping in the Horseshoe area and left anytime after the CCTV footage stops. As the 28 day period for retaining CCTV imagery has passed, there is no way of ascertaining if McKeague does leave the area later in the day. In a Facebook post in November 2018, Nichola Urquhart states that on her last meeting with Suffolk Police, she was shown some CCTV footage of people going in and out of the Horseshoe area on the morning that McKeague disappeared. All the people in the footage were wearing dark clothes apart from one individual who is seen leaving the area wearing light coloured trousers, the same colour that McKeague was wearing on the night in question. Urquhart acknowledged that it was possible that McKeague left and is now AWOL. However she also stated that she has never believed this is probable, Corrie made no plans, had no reason and has never been seen after the immediate sightings.

In October 2018, Suffolk Police revealed that they had analysed the data for the bin weights as carried from the Horseshoe area to the landfill site at Milton and it was normally between 44 pounds (20 kg) and 66 pounds (30 kg) during the period shown as January 2016 to February 2017. It was only nearly 220 pounds (100 kg) once in that entire time; therefore, on the morning of the 24 September 2016, when the load was registered as 256 pounds (116 kg), it was determined that McKeague was inside the bin that had been emptied. The police stated that they believed McKeague's remains to be somewhere in the landfill tip at Milton.

== Police costs ==
By December 2017, Suffolk Police revealed that the inquiry had cost more than £1.2 million as of July 2017, more than 1,400 tonnes (1,500 tons) of earth and waste had been sorted in the second search at the landfill and that they had assessed over 2,000 hours of CCTV imagery. By January 2018, the total cost of the search was £2.1 million; with Suffolk Police having an annual budget of £122 million. The search for McKeague, officially known as Operation Phonetic, was revealed to have been the most expensive Suffolk Police operation in the ten years between 2009 and 2019.

Peter Aldous, the Conservative MP for the Waveney Constituency, petitioned Parliament in February 2018 to back a proposal to refund the Suffolk Constabulary for their costs in the Corrie McKeague disappearance. Effectively, this would mean the Home Office 'reimbursing' the police with £2.15 million to cover the amount spent in searching for McKeague. Aldous described the McKeague inquiry and the necessity to police football matches in Suffolk as "a very difficult science as events will take place that you can never predict".

In March 2018, after spending an estimated £2.15 million on the search, a special application to the UK government had been made because of the cost involved into the disappearance of McKeague, to which the government granted a special payment of £800,000.

== Inquest ==
In November 2020 it was announced that a full inquest would be conducted into McKeague's death, after a request by the family. The inquest began on 7 March 2022 at Suffolk Coroner's Court in Ipswich. It finished on 22 March 2022, concluding that McKeague had died after climbing into a commercial waste bin, which was then tipped into a bin lorry. In a narrative conclusion, jurors said he had died, at about 04:20 BST, in Bury St Edmunds, as a result of "compression asphyxia in association with multiple injuries". His death "was contributed to by impaired judgement due to alcohol consumption".

== See also ==
- List of people who disappeared mysteriously: post-1970
