= Police and crime commissioner =

Elected official in England and Wales

Police areas of England and Wales, that are overseen by a commissioner or an English strategic authority mayor that has received their powers

A police and crime commissioner (PCC; Welsh: comisiynydd yr heddlu a throseddu) is an elected government official in England and Wales responsible for generally overseeing police services. A police, fire and crime commissioner (PFCC) is an elected official in England responsible for generally overseeing both police and fire services. Commissioners replaced the abolished police authorities. The first commissioners were elected on 15 November 2012.

The UK government intends to abolish commissioners at the end of the incumbents' terms in 2028, with oversight of police services to be transferred to devolved mayors, or to policing committees run by council leaders.

== Background ==
Logo of the Association of Police and Crime Commissioners

In the 2010 general election campaign, the manifestos of the Conservatives and Liberal Democrats outlined plans, respectively, to replace or reform the existing police authorities. Following the election, the Conservative–Liberal Democrat coalition agreement of 2010 set out that:

We will introduce measures to make the police more accountable through oversight by a directly elected individual, who will be subject to strict checks and balances by locally elected representatives.

Later in 2010, the government published "Policing in the 21st Century", a consultation on its vision for policing, including the introduction of police and crime commissioners. There was a proposal to call them "sheriffs" but this was rejected after focus groups felt it sounded too American. The consultation was followed by the Police Reform and Social Responsibility Act 2011. The Home Secretary, Theresa May, made the Policing Protocol Order in November 2011, which stated:

The establishment of PCCs has allowed for the Home Office to withdraw from day-to-day policing matters, giving the police greater freedom to fight crime as they see fit, and allowing local communities to hold the police to account.

The Association of Police and Crime Commissioners (APCC) was commissioned by the Home Office to facilitate co-ordination, representation and support for police and crime commissioners and police governance bodies from November 2012. The association represents all 40 PCCs as of April 2021.

== Role and functions ==
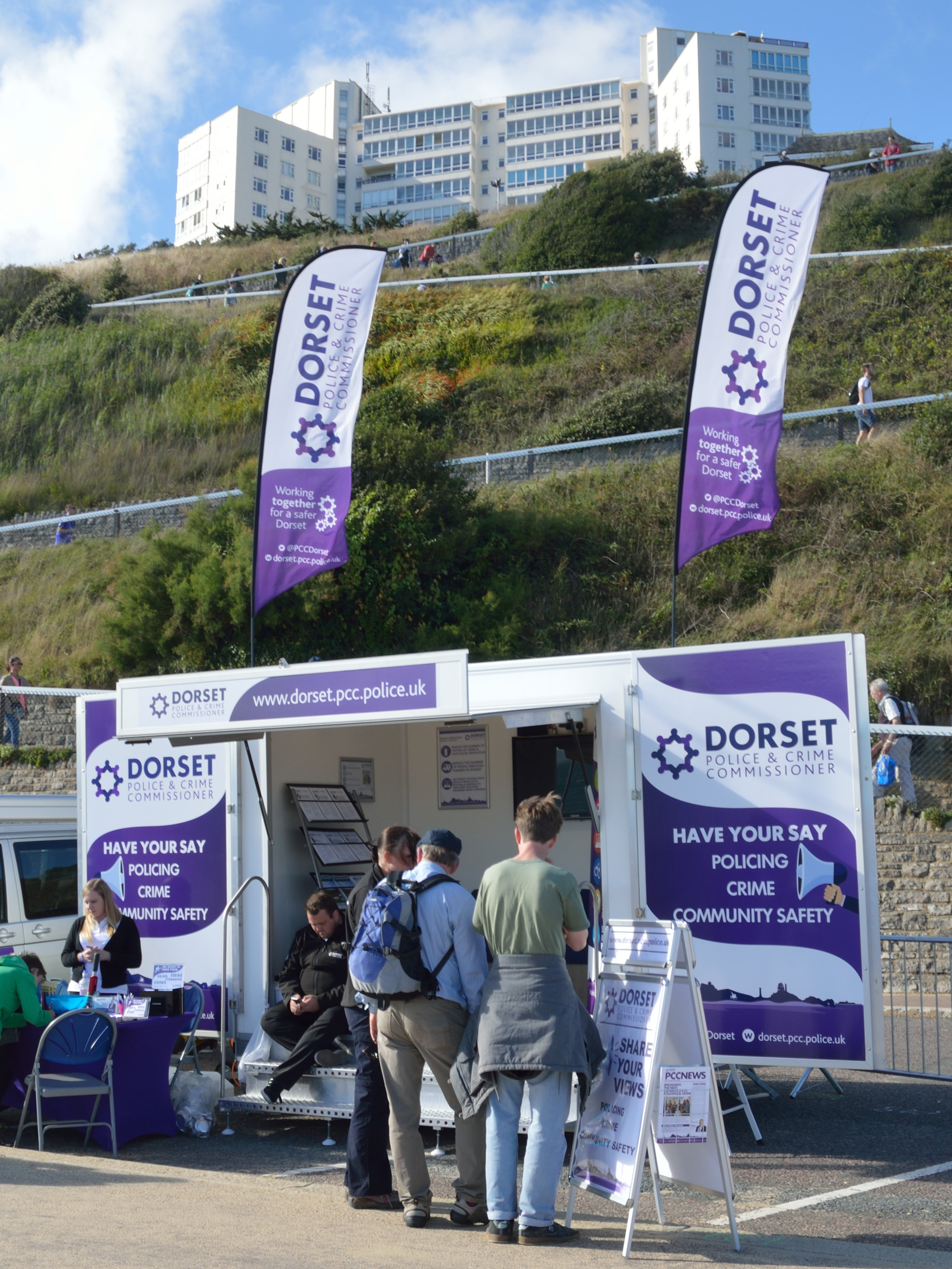
A Dorset Police and Crime Commissioner display to increase public awareness of the role

The core functions of a PCC are to secure the maintenance of an efficient and effective police force within their area, and to hold the chief constable to account for the delivery of the police and crime plan. Police and crime commissioners are charged with holding the police fund (from which all policing of the area is financed) and raising the local policing precept from council tax. Police and crime commissioners are also responsible for the appointment and – if necessary – suspension and dismissal of the Chief Constable, although the 2011 Policing Protocol Order states that the PCC "must not fetter the operational independence of the police force and the Chief Constable who leads it". PCCs are able to appoint a Deputy PCC.

=== Police and crime plans ===
Shortly after their election to office, a PCC must produce a "police and crime plan". That plan must include their objectives for policing, what resources will be provided to the chief constable and how performance will be measured. Both the PCC and the chief constable must have regard to the police and crime plan in the exercise of their duties. The PCC is required to produce an annual report to the public on progress in policing.

=== Police funding ===
Police and crime commissioners hold the 'police fund', from which all policing is financed. The bulk of funding for the police fund comes from the Home Office in the form of an annual grant (calculated on a proportionate basis to take into account the differences between the 43 forces in England and Wales, which vary significantly in terms of population, geographical size, crime levels and trends), though commissioners will also set a precept on the council tax to raise additional funds. If a PCC wishes to increase the precept by an amount deemed to be excessive, the Localism Act 2011 requires a referendum. It is the PCC's responsibility to set the budget for the force area, which includes allocating enough money from the overall policing budget to ensure that the commissioner can discharge their functions effectively.

=== Extension to fire services ===
In September 2015, the government undertook a consultation into proposals which would bring England's fire services under the control of PCCs. As of April 2023 there are five Police, Fire and Crime Commissioners: for Cumbria, Essex, Staffordshire, North Yorkshire and Northamptonshire.

== Police and crime panels ==
The Police Reform and Social Responsibility Act 2011 established police and crime panels within each force area in England and Wales (excluding Greater London). These panels consist of at least one representative from each local authority in that area, and at least two independent members co-opted by the panel.

Panels are responsible for scrutinising PCC decisions and ensuring this information is available to the public. They must review the PCC's draft police and crime plan and draft annual report before publication, and the PCC must give their comments due consideration. A police and crime panel may require the attendance of the commissioner or a staff member at any time, and may suspend a PCC from office who is charged with a serious criminal offence. Police and crime panels will be able to veto a PCC's proposed precept or proposed candidate for Chief Constable by a two-thirds majority.

A National Audit Office report published in January 2014 found that there were "few checks and balances" on the 41 PCCs between elections. It said police and crime panels, which were set up to scrutinise PCCs, "lack powers" to act on the information they receive.

== Oath of impartiality ==
On 16 August 2012, the Home Office announced that every newly elected police and crime commissioner would be required to swear an "oath of impartiality" before taking office. The oath reads:

I do solemnly and sincerely promise that I will serve all the people of [Police Force Area] in the office of police and crime commissioner without fear or favour. I will act with integrity and diligence in my role and, to the best of my ability, will execute the duties of my office to ensure that the police are able to cut crime and protect the public. I will give a voice to the public, especially victims of crime and work with other services to ensure the safety of the community and effective criminal justice. I will take all steps within my power to ensure transparency of my decisions, so that I may be properly held to account by the public. I will not seek to influence or prevent any lawful and reasonable investigation or arrest, nor encourage any police action save that which is lawful and justified within the bounds of this office.

The then Minister for Policing and Criminal Justice, Nick Herbert said:

Police and crime commissioners will be important public servants and it is right that they make a formal public commitment to the communities they will serve. Although police and crime commissioners may stand for a political party, the public will expect them to represent all the people in their area impartially, without fear or favour. The swearing of an oath will be an important symbol of this impartiality, emphasising both the significance of this new role in local communities and that commissioners are there to serve the people, not a political party or any one section of their electorate. An oath will also underline the particular importance of even-handedness in an office which holds to account the local chief constable and police force who themselves are bound to serve impartially.

The Association of Police and Crime Commissioners, set up to act as an "umbrella body" for the elected PCCs, revealed that it had been asked by the Home Office to "seek views from police authorities and prospective candidates on the wording of the oath". By the time the first police and crime commissioner had been elected, in November 2012, the original Home Office text of the "Oath of Impartiality" had been significantly modified. As an example, this is the amended oath as delivered by the police and crime commissioner for Avon and Somerset:

I Sue Mountstevens of North Somerset do hereby declare that I accept the office of Police and Crime Commissioner for Avon and Somerset. In making this declaration, I solemnly and sincerely promise that during my term in office:

I will serve all the people of Avon and Somerset in the office of Police and Crime Commissioner. I will act with integrity and diligence in my role and, to the best of my ability, will execute the duties of my office to ensure that the police are able to cut crime and protect the public. I will give a voice to the public, especially victims of crime, and work with other services to ensure the safety of the community and effective criminal justice. I will take all steps within my power to ensure transparency of my decisions, so that I may be properly held to account by the public.

I will not interfere with the operational independence of police officers.

In South Wales, the title "Oath of Impartiality" was replaced by the term "Oath of Office" on the PCC's website with no mention of "impartiality". In other police areas, like Thames Valley, the PCC's website describes it simply as "The Oath".

The written form of the oath which is signed by all PCCs on taking office is not headed "Oath of Impartiality" but "Declaration of Acceptance of Office".

== Eligibility for election ==
Candidates must be 18 or over. In England, candidates must be registered to vote at local elections at an address within the police area on the date of nomination; in Wales, they must be registered to vote in parliamentary elections, except that overseas electors cannot stand and a local election registration is sufficient for certain people who cannot vote in parliamentary elections, namely peers, "qualifying EU citizens", and "EU citizens with retained rights" (see below for definitions of these terms). Members of the House of Lords are not barred from standing (with the above exception in Wales that they must be registered to vote in local elections in the area). Members of the House of Commons, the European Parliament and the UK's devolved legislatures are not barred from standing but, if they win, they must resign before they can take up a PCC appointment.

Those disqualified from standing or continuing to hold office include:

- Anyone who is, or is nominated as a candidate at an election taking place on the same day for, the police and crime commissioner for a different police area. This includes combined authority mayors exercising the responsibilities of a PCC.
- Anyone who is not:
  - a British citizen,
  - a citizen of the Republic of Ireland,
  - a "qualifying Commonwealth citizen" (meaning a Commonwealth citizen who either does not need leave to enter or remain or has indefinite leave to remain in the UK),
  - a "qualifying EU citizen" (a citizen of a country listed in Schedule 6A of the Representation of the People Act 1983 – currently Luxembourg, Poland, Portugal, Spain, or Denmark – who does not need leave to remain or has infinite right to remain), or
  - an "EU citizen with retained rights" (meaning a European Union citizen who was settled in the UK at the time of Brexit and has been allowed to retain some rights associated with their citizenship, such as residence and voting in local elections).
- Anyone who has ever been convicted of an imprisonable offence. This applies even if they were not actually sentenced to imprisonment, or if the conviction is "spent".
- Anyone who is a police officer or is directly or indirectly employed by the police, as well as staff of a PCC (except a deputy PCC, who must be temporarily acting as PCC if it is a by-election), the Mayor of London, members of the Common Council of the City of London, and that council's staff in its capacity as police authority. "Staff" in this sense includes contractors.
- Anyone who is disqualified under certain provisions of the House of Commons Disqualification Act 1975 including civil servants, members of the regular armed forces or the holders of any judicial offices specified in Part 1 of Schedule 1 of the House of Commons Disqualification Act 1975 (as amended).
- Anyone who is a member of the legislature of any country or territory outside the UK.
- Anyone who is a member of staff of a local council that falls wholly or partly within the police area in which the election is to be held – including anyone employed in an organisation that is under the control of a local council in the police area for which the election is to be held. Fire and rescue authorities are also covered if the PCC in question is also ex officio a fire and rescue authority.
- Anyone who is the subject of a debt relief order or interim order, a bankruptcy restrictions order or interim order, or a debt relief restrictions undertaking.
- Anyone who is disqualified under the Representation of the People Act 1983 (which covers corrupt or illegal electoral practices and offences relating to donations) or under the Audit Commission Act 1998.

Candidates must secure the signatures of 100 people registered to vote within the force area in which they wish to stand and must pay a deposit of £5,000. A person with an anonymous entry in the register of electors cannot nominate a candidate for election. The appointed Deputy PCC is held to similar criteria as the PCC. During the COVID-19 pandemic in the United Kingdom the Cabinet Office reduced the number of signatures candidates required on nomination forms in order to reduce social interaction.

The Association of Police and Crime Commissioners published a candidate briefing prior to the 2021 elections, setting out "Guidance, advice and information for anyone interested in standing as a candidate in the 2021 Police and Crime Commissioner elections".

Jonathon Seed, the Conservative Party candidate for Wiltshire Police and Crime Commissioner in the 2021 election, did not take up his post after it was revealed that he had a conviction for an imprisonable offence. ITV News had asked Seed, his campaign team and the Conservative Party before polling day if Seed had any convictions. In footage posted online, Seed refused to answer questions put to him by news reporters prior to the election. Wiltshire Police asked Thames Valley Police to investigate and he was charged with making a false declaration. He was due to stand trial in July 2022, but in June the Crown Prosecution Service dropped the charges after a pre-trial review on the grounds of insufficient evidence. The re-run of the election was held in August 2021 and was expected to cost £1 million.

== Electoral system ==
Elections for commissioners use first-past-the-post voting. Prior to the passage of the Elections Act 2022, the supplementary vote system was used: voters marked the ballot paper with their first and second choices of candidate. If no candidate had a majority of first-preference votes, all but the top two candidates were eliminated. If a voter's first-choice candidate is eliminated but their second choice is one of the two remaining candidates, their vote is transferred to the second-choice candidate. This means that the winning candidate has the support of a majority of voters who expressed a preference among the top two, although not necessarily a majority of votes cast in the first count. The Police Reform and Social Responsibility Act 2011 directed that first-past-the-post would be used if there were only two candidates for a specific commissioner region. The English Devolution and Community Empowerment Bill aims to reinstate the supplementary vote system for these elections.

Commissioners have a four-year fixed term of office. There is no limit on the number of terms which a PCC can serve. Suffolk Police and Crime Commissioner Tim Passmore and Sussex Police and Crime Commissioner Katy Bourne (both Conservatives) are the longest-serving PCCs, having held office continuously since the inaugural elections in 2012.

== Criticism ==
Issues have included conflict between PCCs and chief constables, questions over PCC expenses, the cost of elections and low voter turnout (in some cases, below 15%). The Plain English Campaign described the commissioners in 2015 as "serial offenders" in "mangling of the English language" and the use of jargon. The former Home Secretary Theresa May, who introduced the directly elected commissioners, in 2014, considered the policy to have had mixed success.

In 2017, the Greater Manchester Police and Crime Commissioner was replaced by the Mayor of Greater Manchester and the role of West Yorkshire Police and Crime Commissioner was absorbed by the mayor of West Yorkshire in 2021. In 2019, both the Metro Mayor of the Liverpool City Region and the Mayor of the West Midlands advocated taking over the police and crime commissioner roles in their respective areas.

In November 2025, the Home Office stated that less than 20% of voters could name their PCC, and Home Secretary Shabana Mahmood described the system as a "failed experiment".

== Planned abolition ==
In November 2025, the UK government announced plans to abolish PCCs in England and Wales by 2028, citing low public awareness and limited effectiveness. The Home Office stated that the move would save £100 million over the standing parliament, with £20 million a year redirected to front-line policing. The responsibilities of the PCCs would be transferred to elected mayors or local council leaders once their terms end. Policing Minister Sarah Jones stated that the system had "failed to live up to expectations" and weakened local accountability. The move was criticised by one commissioner as risking creation of an "accountability vacuum" in UK policing.

The Police Federation of England and Wales welcomed the announcement, with chairwoman Tiff Lynch saying the "tens of millions of pounds" PCCs cost should instead be used to fund the police. According to The Times in December 2025, "Police chiefs viewed PCCs as a block to more extensive reforms because they had a vested interest in keeping the status quo in order to retain their jobs".

== List ==
List of all police and crime commissioners as of May 2024:

=== England ===
Police and crime commissioners in England
Incumbent	Political Party	Office	Ref.
Clare Moody	Labour Co-op	Police and Crime Commissioner for Avon and Somerset	
John Tizard	Labour Co-op	Police and Crime Commissioner for Bedfordshire	
Darryl Preston	Conservative	Police and Crime Commissioner for Cambridgeshire and Peterborough	
Dan Price	Labour Co-op	Police and Crime Commissioner for Cheshire	
Matt Storey	Labour Co-op	Police and Crime Commissioner for Cleveland	
Nicolle Ndiweni	Labour Co-op	Police and Crime Commissioner for Derbyshire	
Alison Hernandez	Independent	Police and Crime Commissioner for Devon, Cornwall and The Isles of Scilly	
David Sidwick	Conservative	Police and Crime Commissioner for Dorset	
Joy Allen	Labour Co-op	Police and Crime Commissioner for Durham	
Chris Nelson	Conservative	Police and Crime Commissioner for Gloucestershire	
Donna Jones	Conservative	Police and Crime Commissioner for Hampshire	
Jonathan Ash-Edwards	Conservative	Police and Crime Commissioner for Hertfordshire	
Jonathan Evison	Conservative	Police and Crime Commissioner for Humberside	
Matthew Scott	Conservative	Police and Crime Commissioner for Kent	
Clive Grunshaw	Labour Co-op	Police and Crime Commissioner for Lancashire	
Rupert Matthews	Reform	Police and Crime Commissioner for Leicestershire	
Marc Jones	Independent	Police and Crime Commissioner for Lincolnshire	
Emily Spurrell	Labour Co-op	Police and Crime Commissioner for Merseyside	
Colin Sutton	Reform	Police and Crime Commissioner for Norfolk	
Susan Dungworth	Labour Co-op	Police and Crime Commissioner for Northumbria	
Gary Godden	Labour Co-op	Police and Crime Commissioner for Nottinghamshire	
Tim Passmore	Conservative	Police and Crime Commissioner for Suffolk	
Lisa Townsend	Conservative	Police and Crime Commissioner for Surrey	
Katy Bourne	Conservative	Police and Crime Commissioner for Sussex	
Matthew Barber	Conservative	Police and Crime Commissioner for Thames Valley	
Philip Seccombe	Conservative	Police and Crime Commissioner for Warwickshire	
John Campion	Conservative	Police and Crime Commissioner for West Mercia	
Simon Foster	Labour	Police and Crime Commissioner for West Midlands	
Philip Wilkinson	Conservative	Police and Crime Commissioner for Wiltshire	

Police, fire and crime commissioners in England
Incumbent	Political Party	Office	Ref.
David Allen	Labour Co-op	Police, Fire and Crime Commissioner for Cumbria	
Roger Hirst	Conservative	Police, Fire and Crime Commissioner for Essex	
Danielle Stone	Labour Co-op	Police, Fire and Crime Commissioner for Northamptonshire	
Ben Adams	Conservative	Police, Fire and Crime Commissioner for Staffordshire	

Mayors with police and crime commissioner functions in England
Incumbent	Political Party	Office	Ref.
Oliver Coppard	Labour Co-op	Mayor of South Yorkshire	
Tracy Brabin	Labour Co-op	Mayor of West Yorkshire	

Mayors with police, fire and crime commissioner functions in England
Incumbent	Political Party	Office	Ref.
Bev Craig	Labour Co-op	Mayor of Greater Manchester	
Sadiq Khan	Labour	Mayor of London	
David Skaith	Labour Co-op	Mayor of York and North Yorkshire	

The City of London Police Committee, chaired by James Thomson, oversees the City of London Police.

=== Wales ===
Police and crime commissioners in Wales
Incumbent	Political Party	Office	Ref.
Dafydd Llywelyn	Plaid Cymru	Police and Crime Commissioner for Dyfed-Powys	
Jane Mudd	Labour Co-op	Police and Crime Commissioner for Gwent	
Andy Dunbobbin	Labour Co-op	Police and Crime Commissioner for North Wales	
Emma Wools	Labour Co-op	Police and Crime Commissioner for South Wales	

=== Scotland ===
In Scotland, the Scottish Police Authority serves in a similar capacity for Police Scotland.

=== Northern Ireland ===
In Northern Ireland, the Northern Ireland Policing Board fulfils a similar role for the Police Service of Northern Ireland.

=== Non-geographic authorities ===
The British Transport Police Authority, Ministry of Defence Police Committee and Civil Nuclear Police Authority oversee the British Transport Police, Ministry of Defence Police and Civil Nuclear Constabulary, respectively.

== Elections ==
=== 2021 elections ===
Elections originally scheduled for May 2020 were delayed by 12 months due to the COVID-19 pandemic.

== See also ==
- Sheriffs in the United States, elected officials also responsible for the administration of law within a given geographic area
