= Helmingham and Coddenham Ward =

Electoral ward in Mid Suffolk, England

The candidate information for the Helmingham and Coddenham Ward in Mid-Suffolk, Suffolk, England.

== Councillors ==
| Election | Member | Party |
|---|---|---|
| 2003 | Tim Passmore | Conservative |
| 2007 | Tim Passmore | Conservative |
| 2011 | Tim Passmore | Conservative |
| 2015 | Tim Passmore | Conservative |

== 2011 Results ==
| Candidate name: | Party name: | Votes: | % of votes: |
|---|---|---|---|
| Tim Passmore | Conservative | 719 | 73.22 |
| Spurling, Martin | Liberal Democrat | 263 | 26.78 |

== 2015 Results ==
The turnout of the election was 75.60%.

| Candidate name: | Party name: | Votes: | % of votes: |
|---|---|---|---|
| Tim Passmore | Conservative | 956 | 70.76 |
| Martin SPURLING | Liberal Democrat | 395 | 29.24 |

== See also ==
- Mid Suffolk local elections
