= James Rae (surgeon) =

Scottish surgeon

James Rae (1716–1791) was a Scottish surgeon, known as the earliest lecturer on surgery in Edinburgh and with a particular reputation as a dental surgeon.

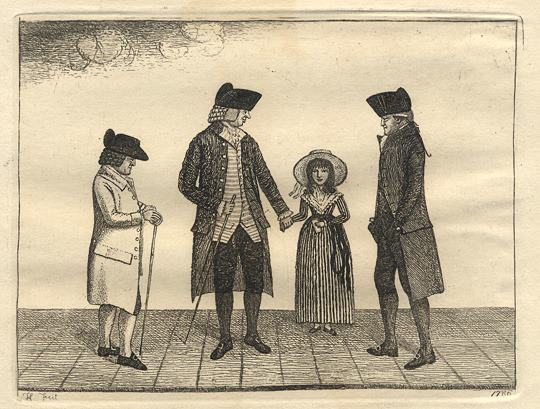
Engraving from 1786 in John Kay's Edinburgh Portraits: James Rae (left) in conversation with Dr. William Laing and Dr. James Hay, later Sir James Hay of Smithfield

== Life ==
The only son of John Rae (1677–1754), a barber-surgeon originally from Stirlingshire, James was born in Edinburgh in 1716. In 1741 he was apprenticed to the surgeon Robert Hope, on whose death he was apprenticed to George Lauder. After passing four examinations he became, on 27 August 1747, a Freeman (Fellow) of the Incorporation of Surgeons of Edinburgh. In 1764–1765 he filled the office of Deacon or President.

Rae was appointed surgeon-in-ordinary to the Edinburgh Royal Infirmary on 7 July 1766. There he gave practical discourses on cases of importance. In October 1776 his fellow surgeons made a determined attempt to found a professorship of surgery in the University of Edinburgh, and to appoint Rae the first professor. They were defeated by Alexander Monro secundus, who then managed persuade the authorities to convert his own chair of anatomy into one of anatomy and surgery, despite the fact that he had never been a practising surgeon.

Rae did in Edinburgh what Percivall Pott did in London, in establishing the teaching of clinical surgery. In 1772 he asked the College of Surgeons to "recognise and support a course of lectures on the whole art of surgery..." The college readily agreed and recommended their apprentices to attend the course.

From 1764 Rae had also gave lectures on diseases of the teeth. Boyes claims that this was the first course of lectures in dentistry to be given in Britain. He established a reputation as a dentist and was "among the first, (if not the first) in Edinburgh to rescue that department from the ignorant and unskilled hands in which it was then placed."

== Death ==
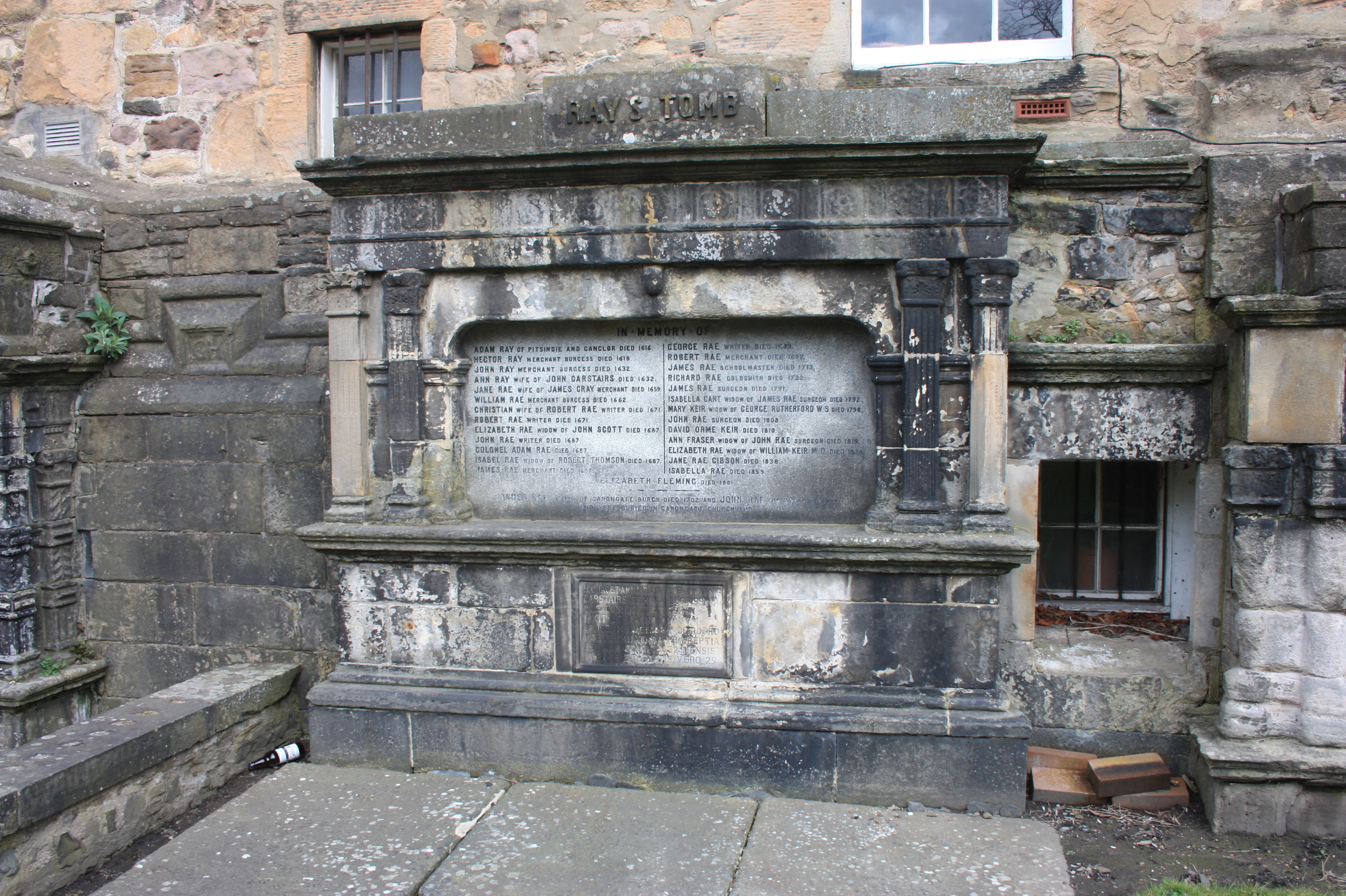
The grave of the Rae family, Greyfriars Kirkyard

He lived his final years at Castlehill, the upper section of the Royal Mile.

He died in 1791, and was buried in the tomb of his forefathers in Greyfriars Kirk. His wife, Isabella Cant died the next year and was buried with him.

The grave lies mid-way along the eastern boundary wall.

== Family ==
Rae married, in 1744, Isobel, daughter of Ludovic Cant of Thurstan. By her he had two sons and several daughters. The elder son William joined the Incorporation of Surgeons on 18 July 1777, settled in London, where he married Isabella, sister of Robert Dallas, and died young. John, the younger brother, was one of the first fellows of the Royal College of Surgeons of Edinburgh, where he was admitted on 14 March 1781. He became president in 1804–1805, and, like his father, was known as a dentist. He died in 1808. Among Rae's daughters were: Elizabeth Keir, who founded the Institution for the Relief of Incurables; Elizabeth (Isabella), mother of Marjorie Fleming; and Margaret, mother of William Fettes.
