= Tim Passmore =

English police and crime commissioner

Suffolk Police and Crime Commissioner
- Incumbent
- Assumed office 22 November 2012
- Preceded by: Office created

Leader of Mid Suffolk District Council
- In office August 2005 – November 2012
- Preceded by: Roger Saunders
- Succeeded by: Derrick Haley

Mid Suffolk District Councillor for Claydon & Barham
- In office 2 May 2019 – 4 May 2023
- Preceded by: James Caston
- Succeeded by: David Penny

Mid Suffolk District Councillor for Helmingham and Coddenham
- In office 1 May 2003 – 2 May 2019
- Preceded by: New Seat
- Succeeded by: Seat Abolished

Personal details
- Born: Timothy Henry Weeks Passmore; October 1959 (age 66)
- Party: Conservative

Timothy Passmore (born October 1959) is the Conservative Suffolk Police and Crime Commissioner.

== Political career ==
He is the first person to hold the post and was elected on 15 November 2012, and re-elected three times on 6 May 2016, 8 May 2021 and 4 May 2023. He is a former leader of Mid Suffolk District Council.

== Personal life ==
Passmore was educated at Ipswich School in Ipswich, Suffolk.
