= 2024 England and Wales police and crime commissioner elections =

Series of local elections in England and Wales

2024 Police and crime commissioner elections
- 2 May 2024

37 police and crime commissioners in England and Wales 5 Combined Authority Mayors with PCC powers
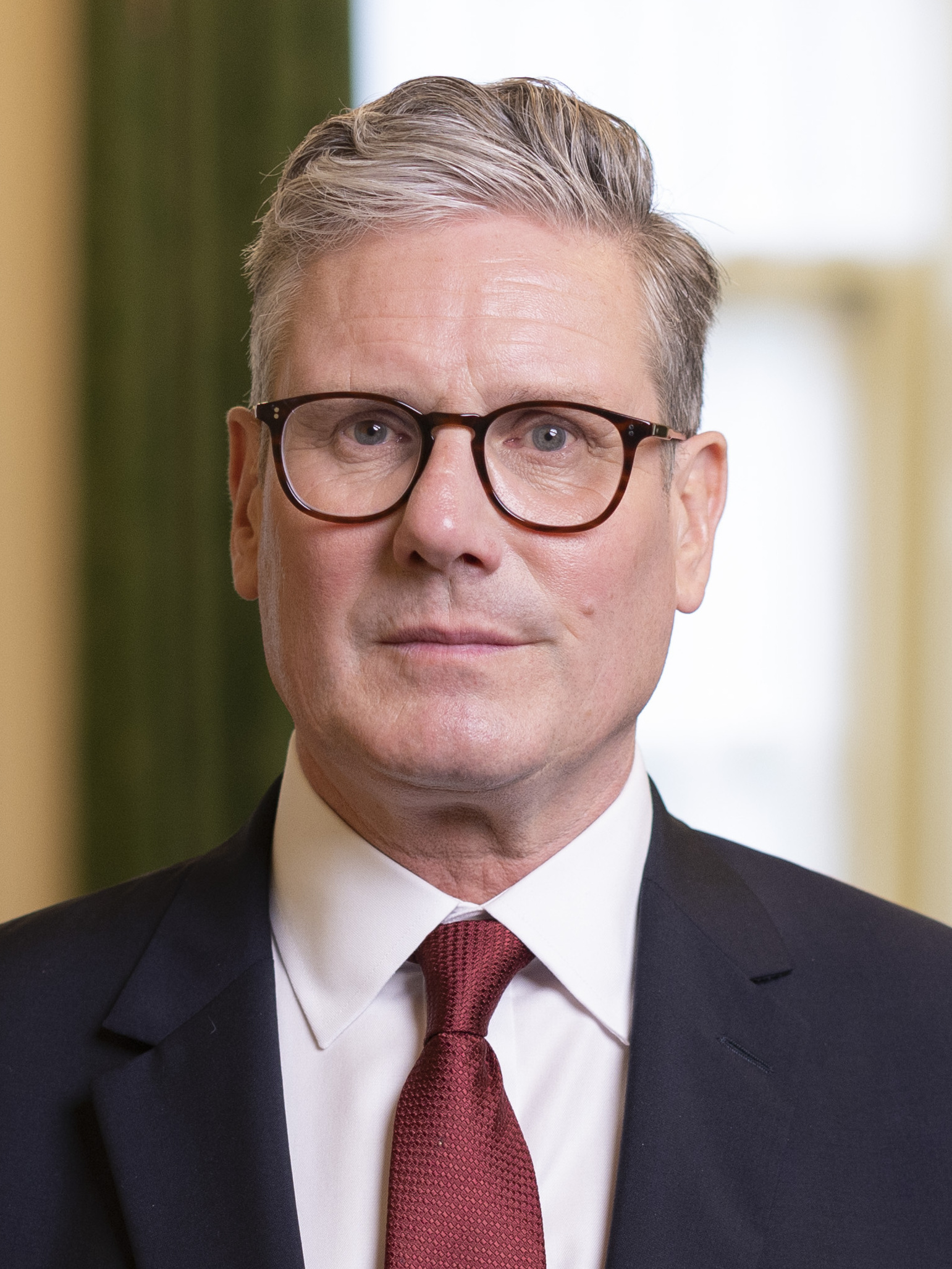

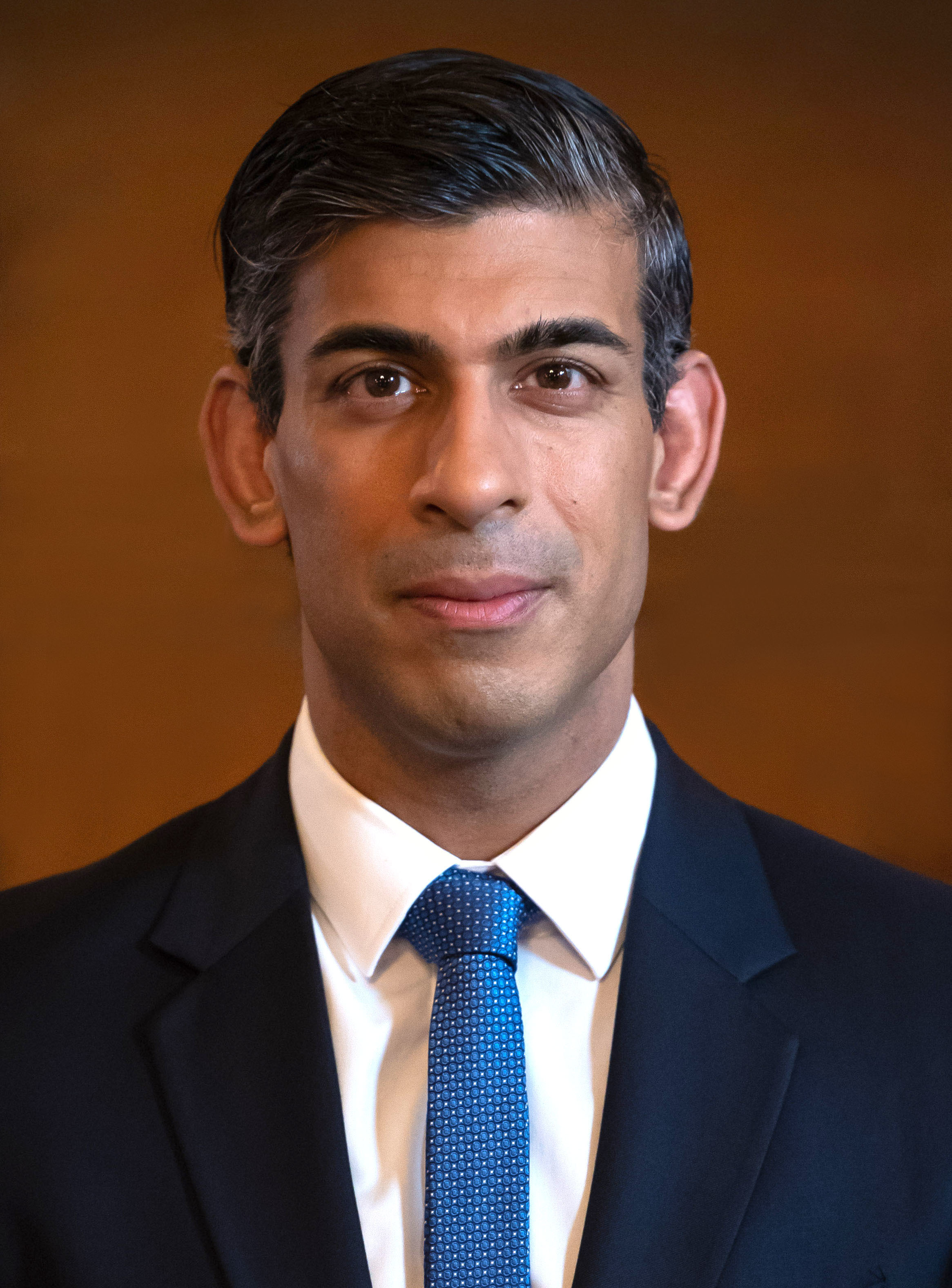

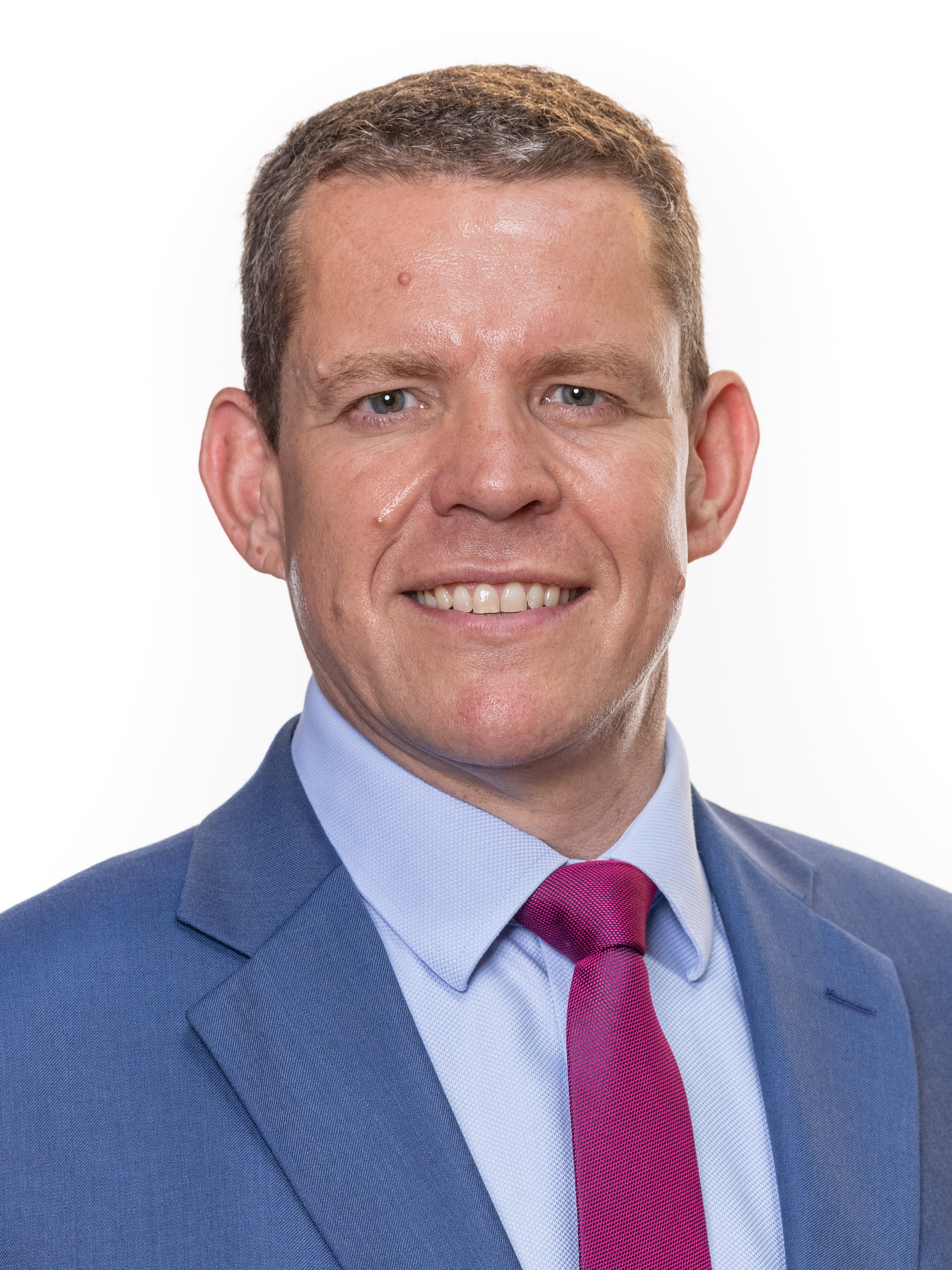
	First party	Second party	Third party
Leader	Keir Starmer	Rishi Sunak	Rhun ap Iorwerth
Party	Labour	Conservative	Plaid Cymru
Leader since	4 April 2020	24 October 2022	16 June 2023
Last election	11 seats	30 seats	1 seat
Seats before	10	30	1
PCCs	22 (Note: Includes 5 Metro Mayors with PCC powers.)	19	1
Change	▲11	▼11	Steady
Popular vote	4,876,926	3,788,835	92,063
Percentage	41.6%	32.3%	0.8%
Swing	▲7.2%	▼8.3%	▼0.9%
- Colours denote the winning party, as shown in the main table of results.

Elections for police and crime commissioners in England and Wales took place on 2 May 2024, the same day as local elections in England. These elections will likely be the last elections held for the office, with the Home Office announcing in November 2025 that it intends to move the responsibilities Police and Crime Commissioners have to either an elected mayor or council leaders at the end of the current terms in 2028.

== Background ==
Police and crime commissioners (PCCs) are elected representatives with responsibility for policing in each police area in England and Wales. Each police area elects a commissioner every four years, with the exception of police areas where responsibility for policing has passed to regional mayors such as Greater London and Greater Manchester.

This was the first Police and Crime Commissioner elections to use the first past the post system following the passage of the Elections Act 2022. The supplementary vote system had been used for previous elections.

The Policing and Crime Act 2017, which amended the 2011 Act, enabled PCCs to take over governance of the local fire and rescue service. PCCs who have taken on these responsibilities are known as Police Fire and Crime Commissioners (PFCCs).

In 2023, it was reported that Rishi Sunak's government wanted to create more elected metro mayors to take over the role of PCCs. The roles of PCCs for North Yorkshire, and South Yorkshire will be abolished, with responsibilities being taken over by their respective metro mayors. The government had planned to abolish the West Midlands PCC and transfer its powers to the Mayor of the West Midlands, however the incumbent PCC, Simon Foster, successfully challenged the transfer of powers in the High Court.

== Results by political allegiance ==
This table includes the results of elections for Combined Authority Mayors with Police and crime commissioner responsibilities which were held on the same day.

Party	Votes	Share	Change	Stood	Seats	Share	Change
Labour	4,876,926	41.6	▲7.2	42	22	52.4	▲11
Conservative	3,788,835	32.3	▼7.3	42	19	45.2	▼11
Liberal Democrats	1,562,492	13.3	▲2.2	40	0	—	Steady
Green	567,555	4.8	▲1.1	13	0	—	Steady
Independent	304,164	2.6	▼1.5	13	0	—	Steady
Reform	176,859	1.5	▲0.5	4	0	—	Steady
Plaid Cymru	92,063	0.8	▼0.9	4	1	2.4	Steady
English Democrat	63,537	0.5	▲0.1	3	0	—	Steady
SDP	55,284	0.5	▲0.4	2	0	—	Steady
Yorkshire	47,937	0.4	Steady	1	0	—	Steady
More Police Officers	46,853	0.4	▲0.4	1	0	—	Steady
JAC	40,691	0.3	▲0.3	1	0	—	Steady
Animal Welfare	29,280	0.2	▲0.1	1	0	—	Steady
Count Binface	24,260	0.2	Steady	1	0	—	Steady
Britain First	20,519	0.2	▲0.2	1	0	—	Steady
Workers Party	8,396	0.1	▲0.1	1	0	—	Steady
London Real	7,501	0.1	▼0.1	1	0	—	Steady
One Leicester	7,104	0.1	▲0.1	1	0	—	Steady

== England ==
=== Avon and Somerset Police ===
Winner of each local authority within the Avon and Somerset Constabulary electoral area

2024 Avon and Somerset Police and Crime Commissioner election
Party	Candidate	Votes	%	±%
Labour Co-op	Clare Moody	95,982	32.3	+8.6
Conservative	Mark Shelford	91,006	30.6	−4.1
Green	Katy Grant	64,623	21.7	+5.3
Liberal Democrats	Benet Allen	45,864	15.4	+2.0
Turnout		300,744	23.1	−7.6
Rejected ballots		3,262	1.1	
Labour Co-op gain from Conservative		Swing		

==== Results by authority ====
District	Total votes	Labour Co-op		Conservative		Green		Lib Dem	
District	Total votes	#	%	#	%	#	%	#	%
Bath & North East Somerset	29,754	9,626	32.2	10,281	34.4	5,088	17.0	4,859	16.3
Bristol	114,795	47,220	41.1	19,788	17.2	37,375	32.6	10,412	9.1
North Somerset	30,292	9,352	30.9	12,367	40.8	5,027	16.6	3,546	11.7
Somerset	77,953	14,692	18.8	31,042	39.8	10,850	13.9	21,369	27.4
South Gloucestershire	44,681	15,192	34.0	17,528	39.2	6,283	14.1	5,678	12.7

=== Bedfordshire Police ===
Winner of each local authority in the Bedfordshire Police electoral area

2024 Bedfordshire police and crime commissioner election
Party	Candidate	Votes	%	±%
Labour Co-op	John Tizard	40,738	40.5	+5.5
Conservative	Festus Akinbusoye	35,688	35.5	−6.9
Liberal Democrats	Jasbir Singh Parmar	15,857	15.8	−2.7
Workers Party	Waheed Akbar	8,396	8.3	N/A
Majority		5,050		
Turnout		101,600	19.8	
Rejected ballots		921	0.9	
Labour Co-op gain from Conservative		Swing		

==== Result by authority ====
District	Total votes	Conservative		Labour Co-op		Lib Dem		Workers Party	
District	Total votes	#	%	#	%	#	%	#	%
Bedford	28,289	10,758	38.0	10,930	38.6	5,194	18.4	1,407	5.0
Central Bedfordshire	44,996	18,541	41.2	17,979	40.0	7,206	16.0	1,270	2.8
Luton	27,394	6,389	23.3	11,829	43.2	3,457	12.6	5,719	20.9

=== Cambridgeshire Constabulary ===
Winner of each local authority in the Cambridgeshire Constabulary electoral area

2024 Cambridgeshire police and crime commissioner election
Party	Candidate	Votes	%	±%
Conservative	Darryl Preston	61,688	38.1	−4.8
Labour Co-op	Anna Smith	58,304	36.0	+4.7
Liberal Democrats	Edna Murphy	41,984	25.9	+3.6
Turnout		161,976	25.6	
Rejected ballots		2,837	1.7	
Conservative hold		Swing		

==== Results by authority ====
District	Total votes	Conservative		Labour Co-op		Lib Dem	
District	Total votes	#	%	#	%	#	%
Cambridge	32,656	7,847	24.0	16,341	50.0	8,468	25.9
East Cambridgeshire	14,182	5,688	40.1	4,127	29.1	4,367	30.8
Fenland	13,185	7,044	53.4	3,861	29.3	2,280	17.3
Huntingdonshire	27,422	12,487	45.5	7,950	29.0	6,985	25.5
Peterborough	43,037	17,360	40.3	16,884	39.2	8,793	20.4
South Cambridgeshire	31,494	11,262	35.8	9,141	29.0	11,091	35.2

=== Cheshire Constabulary ===
Winner of each local authority in the Cheshire Constabulary electoral area

2024 Cheshire police and crime commissioner election
Party	Candidate	Votes	%	±%
Labour	Dan Price	86,279	48.1	+10.8
Conservative	John Dwyer	65,836	36.7	−7.9
Liberal Democrats	Paul Duffy	27,342	15.2	+0.7
Turnout		179,457	21.7	
Rejected ballots		2,518	1.4	
Labour gain from Conservative		Swing		

==== Results by authority ====
District	Total votes	Labour		Conservative		Lib Dem	
District	Total votes	#	%	#	%	#	%
Cheshire East	60,030	23,786	39.6	26,798	44.6	9,446	15.7
Cheshire West & Chester	51,397	24,547	47.8	19,903	38.7	6,947	13.5
Halton	19,885	13,547	68.1	3,746	18.8	2,592	13.0
Warrington	48,145	24,399	50.7	15,389	32.0	8,357	17.4

=== Cleveland Police ===
Winner of each local authority in the Cleveland Police electoral area

2024 Cleveland police and crime commissioner election
Party	Candidate	Votes	%	±%
Labour Co-op	Matt Storey	65,418	52.6	+23.7
Conservative	Steve Turner	58,977	47.4	−6.8
Turnout		124,395	30.2	
Labour Co-op gain from Conservative		Swing		

==== Results by authority ====
District	Total votes	Labour		Conservative	
District	Total votes	#	%	#	%
Hartlepool	19,500	11,042	56.6	8,458	43.4
Middlesbrough	26,974	15,084	55.9	11,890	44.1
Redcar & Cleveland	29,165	14,406	49.4	14,759	50.6
Stockton-on-Tees	48,756	24,886	51.0	23,870	49.0

=== Cumbria Constabulary ===
2024 Cumbria police, fire and crime commissioner election
Party	Candidate	Votes	%	±%
Labour Co-op	David Allen	38,708	47.4	+21.3
Conservative	Mike Johnson	24,863	30.4	−23.1
Liberal Democrats	Adrian Waite	18,100	22.2	+1.8
Turnout		81,671	21.2	
Labour Co-op gain from Conservative		Swing		

==== Results by authority ====
District	Total votes	Labour		Conservative		Lib Dem	
District	Total votes	#	%	#	%	#	%
Cumberland	43,899	25,717	58.6	14,617	33.3	3,565	8.1
Westmorland and Furness	37,772	12,991	34.4	10,246	27.1	14,535	38.5

=== Derbyshire Constabulary ===
Winner of each local authority in the Derbyshire Constabulary electoral area

2024 Derbyshire police and crime commissioner election
Party	Candidate	Votes	%	±%
Labour Co-op	Nicolle Ndiweni	93,260	43.6	+6.1
Conservative	Angelique Foster	65,293	30.5	−18.9
Reform	Russell Armstrong	32,944	15.4	+11.6
Liberal Democrats	David Hancock	22,540	10.5	+1.3
Turnout		216,851	26.9	
Rejected ballots		2,814	1.3	
Labour Co-op gain from Conservative		Swing		

==== Results by authority ====
District	Total votes	Labour Co-op		Conservative		Reform UK		Lib Dem	
District	Total votes	#	%	#	%	#	%	#	%
Amber Valley	28,594	11,595	40.6	9,345	32.7	5,192	18.2	2,462	8.6
Bolsover	13,780	6,538	47.4	3,634	26.4	2,523	18.3	1,085	7.9
Chesterfield	19,300	9,189	47.6	4,239	22.0	2,632	13.6	3,240	16.8
Derby	45,517	21,430	47.1	11,916	26.2	7,911	17.4	4,260	9.4
Derbyshire Dales	18,899	6,792	35.9	6,822	36.1	2,097	11.1	3,188	16.9
Erewash	23,446	9,413	40.1	8,050	34.3	4,116	17.6	1,867	8.0
High Peak	21,674	11,325	52.3	6,234	28.8	2,275	10.5	1,840	8.5
North East Derbyshire	22,399	8,876	39.6	7,854	25.1	2,825	12.6	2,844	12.7
South Derbyshire	20,428	8,102	39.7	7,199	35.2	3,373	16.5	1,754	8.6

=== Devon and Cornwall Police ===
Winner of each local authority within the Devon and Cornwall Police electoral area

2024 Devon and Cornwall police and crime commissioner election
Party	Candidate	Votes	%	±%
Conservative	Alison Hernandez	131,764	43.3	−6.7
Labour Co-op	Daniel Steel	107,897	35.4	+15.2
Liberal Democrats	Steve Lodge	64,790	21.3	+3.4
Turnout		304,451	22.5	−13.6
Conservative hold		Swing	-21.9	

==== Results by authority ====
District	Total votes	Conservative		Labour Co-op		Lib Dem	
District	Total votes	#	%	#	%	#	%
Cornwall	81,198	35,536	43.8	28,290	35.4	17,372	21.4
East Devon	25,407	12,530	49.3	6,591	25.9	6,286	24.7
Exeter	31,415	9,785	31.1	15,742	50.1	5,888	18.7
Isles of Scilly	270	134	49.6	77	28.5	59	21.9
Mid Devon	13,259	5,946	44.8	4,072	30.7	3,241	24.4
North Devon	13,704	6,605	48.2	3,093	22.6	4,006	29.2
Plymouth	60,063	23,346	38.9	28,645	47.7	8,073	13.4
South Hams	15,744	6,995	44.4	4,804	30.5	3,945	25.1
Teignbridge	22,664	10,154	44.8	7,174	31.7	5,336	23.5
Torbay	20,324	10,801	53.1	4,603	22.6	4,920	24.2
Torridge	10,560	5,110	48.4	2,779	26.3	2,671	25.3
West Devon	9,842	4,822	49.0	3,858	29.0	2,162	22.0

=== Dorset Police ===
2024 Dorset police and crime commissioner election
Party	Candidate	Votes	%	±%
Conservative	David Sidwick	57,994	38.2	−4.3
Liberal Democrats	Howard Legg	34,774	22.9	+11.1
Independent	Marianne Storey	32,237	21.2	N/A
Labour Co-op	David Stokes	26,884	17.7	+6.8
Turnout		154,436	26.0	
Rejected ballots		2,550	1.7	
Conservative hold		Swing		

==== Results by authority ====
District	Total votes	Conservative		Lib Dem		Storey		Labour Co-op	
District	Total votes	#	%	#	%	#	%	#	%
Bournemouth, Christchurch and Poole	55,485	20,782	37.5	6,754	12.2	13,624	24.6	14,325	25.8
Dorset	96,404	37,212	38.6	28,020	29.1	18,613	19.3	12,559	13.0

=== Durham Constabulary ===
2024 Durham police and crime commissioner election
Party	Candidate	Votes	%	±%
Labour Co-op	Joy Allen	66,752	56.0	+12.2
Conservative	Rob Potts	37,773	31.7	−11.3
Liberal Democrats	Nigel Boddy	14,678	12.3	−0.9
Turnout		119,303		
Labour Co-op hold		Swing		

==== Results by authority ====
District	Total votes	Labour Co-op		Conservative		Lib Dem	
District	Total votes	#	%	#	%	#	%
County Durham	93,994	56,047	59.6	26,682	28.4	11,265	12.0
Darlington	25,209	10,705	42.5	11,091	44.0	3,413	13.5

=== Essex Police ===
Winner of each local authority within the Essex Police electoral area

2024 Essex police, fire and crime commissioner election
Party	Candidate	Votes	%	±%
Conservative	Roger Hirst	126,447	37.1	−16.9
Labour Co-op	Adam Fox	116,875	34.3	+11.4
Liberal Democrats	Kieron Franks	52,922	15.5	+2.2
English Democrat	Robin Tilbrook	44,909	13.2	+3.4
Turnout		330,397	24.9	
Rejected ballots		5,200	1.5	
Conservative hold		Swing		

==== Result by authority ====
District	Total votes	Conservative		Labour Co-op		Lib Dem		English Democrats	
District	Total votes	#	%	#	%	#	%	#	%
Basildon	34,174	13,181	38.6	12,096	35.4	3,860	11.3	5,042	14.8
Braintree	21,631	8,849	40.9	7,878	36.4	2,107	9.7	2,797	12.9
Brentwood	19,495	7,903	40.5	3,956	20.3	5,896	30.2	1,740	8.9
Castle Point	19,271	7,690	39.9	4,997	25.9	1,671	8.7	4,913	25.5
Chelmsford	25,313	9,976	39.4	5,965	23.6	6,805	26.9	2,567	10.1
Colchester	41,107	12,079	29.4	16,040	39.0	9,389	22.8	3,599	8.8
Epping Forest	28,972	12,725	43.9	7,584	26.2	4,856	16.8	3,807	13.1
Harlow	18,224	7,189	39.4	8,338	45.8	1,111	6.1	1,586	8.7
Maldon	9,066	3,989	44.0	2,341	25.8	1,166	12.9	1,570	17.3
Rochford	18,779	7,022	37.4	4,845	25.8	3,627	19.3	3,285	17.5
Southend-on-Sea	39,145	13,783	35.2	15,925	40.7	5,337	13.6	4,100	10.5
Tendring	20,953	8,441	40.3	6,795	32.4	2,162	10.3	3,555	17.0
Thurrock	30,952	7,891	25.5	15,806	51.1	2,616	8.5	4,639	15.0
Uttlesford	14,066	5,729	40.7	4,309	30.6	2,319	16.5	1,709	12.1

=== Gloucestershire Constabulary ===
Winner of each local authority within the Gloucestershire Police electoral area

2024 Gloucestershire police and crime commissioner election
Party	Candidate	Votes	%	±%
Conservative	Chris Nelson	47,838	32.7	−8.0
Liberal Democrats	Martin Surl	46,352	31.7	+12.7
Labour Co-op	Ashley Smith	35,069	24.0	+7.9
Independent	Matthew Randolph	15,240	10.4	N/A
Majority		1,486	1.0	
Rejected ballots		1,851	1.3	
Turnout		146,347	29.5	
Conservative hold		Swing		

==== Results by authority ====
District	Total votes	Conservative		Lib Dem		Labour Co-op		Ind	
District	Total votes	#	%	#	%	#	%	#	%
Cheltenham	31,819	10,146	31.9	15,051	47.3	3,991	12.5	2,631	8.3
Cotswold	16,732	7,814	46.7	5,577	33.3	2,046	12.2	1,295	7.7
Forest of Dean	13,359	4,693	35.1	3,251	24.3	3,722	27.9	1,693	12.7
Gloucester	28,305	8,622	30.5	7,881	27.8	7,863	27.8	3,939	13.9
Stroud	39,057	10,881	27.9	9,497	24.3	14,804	37.9	3,875	9.9
Tewkesbury	15,227	5,682	37.3	5,095	33.5	2,643	17.4	1,807	11.9

=== Greater Manchester Police ===
2024 Greater Manchester mayoral election
Party	Candidate	Votes	%	±%
Labour Co-op	Andy Burnham	420,749	63.4	−3.9
Conservative	Laura Evans	68,946	10.4	−9.2
Independent	Nick Buckley	50,304	7.6	+7.6
Reform	Dan Barker	49,532	7.5	+4.8
Green	Hannah Spencer	45,905	6.9	+2.5
Liberal Democrats	Jake Austin	28,195	4.2	−0.2
Majority		351,803	53.0	
Rejected ballots		5,863		
Turnout		663,631	32.0	
Registered electors				
Labour Co-op hold		Swing	+2.7	

=== Hampshire and Isle of Wight Constabulary ===
Winner of each local authority in the Hampshire and Isle of Wight Constabulary electoral area

2024 Hampshire & Isle of Wight police and crime commissioner election
Party	Candidate	Votes	%	±%
Conservative	Donna Jones	175,953	42.3	−7.5
Labour Co-op	Becky Williams	106,141	25.5	+6.2
Liberal Democrats	Prad Bains	92,843	22.3	+4.6
JAC	Don Jerrard	40,691	9.8	N/A
Turnout		421,965	28.4	
Rejected ballots		6,337	1.5	
Conservative hold		Swing		

==== Result by authority ====
District	Total votes	Conservative		Labour Co-op		Lib Dem		JAC	
District	Total votes	#	%	#	%	#	%	#	%
Basingstoke & Deane	43,309	17,714	40.9	13,013	30.0	7,971	18.4	4,611	10.6
East Hampshire	21,474	10,416	48.5	3,765	17.5	5,022	23.4	2,271	10.6
Eastleigh	31,773	11,583	36.5	5,667	17.8	11,703	36.8	2,820	8.9
Fareham	31,651	16,072	50.8	5,603	17.7	7,176	22.7	2,800	8.8
Gosport	20,818	9,886	47.5	3,911	18.8	4,745	22.8	2,276	10.9
Hart	24,879	10,591	42.6	4,767	19.2	7,117	28.6	2,404	9.7
Havant	27,147	12,103	44.6	6,933	25.5	5,090	18.7	3,021	11.1
Isle of Wight	18,035	8,997	49.9	4,973	27.6	2,014	11.2	2,051	11.4
New Forest	26,574	13,855	52.1	4,990	18.8	4,685	17.6	3,044	11.5
Portsmouth	41,004	14,117	34.4	13,695	33.4	8,627	21.0	4,565	11.1
Rushmoor	22,132	8,345	37.7	9,746	44.0	2,384	10.8	1,657	7.5
Southampton	46,947	16,096	34.3	19,893	42.4	6,585	14.0	4,373	9.3
Test Valley	21,387	10,539	49.3	4,092	19.1	4,532	21.2	2,224	10.4
Winchester	38,498	15,639	40.6	5,093	13.2	15,192	39.5	2,574	6.7

=== Hertfordshire Constabulary ===
Winner of each local authority in the Hertfordshire Constabulary electoral area

2024 Hertfordshire police and crime commissioner election
Party	Candidate	Votes	%	±%
Conservative	Jonathan Ash-Edwards	93,658	36.7	−11.8
Liberal Democrats	Sean Prendergast	68,264	26.7	−0.6
Labour Co-op	Tom Plater	66,585	26.1	+2.1
Green	Matt Fisher	26,714	10.5	N/A
Turnout		258,298		
Rejected ballots		3,077	1.2	
Conservative hold		Swing		

==== Results by authority ====
District	Total votes	Conservative		Lib Dem		Labour Co-op		Green	
District	Total votes	#	%	#	%	#	%	#	%
Broxbourne	19,015	10,125	53.2	1,398	7.4	5,685	29.9	1,807	9.5
Dacorum	23,296	8,726	37.5	6,949	29.8	5,536	23.8	2,085	9.0
East Hertfordshire	22,941	9,449	41.2	4,261	18.6	5,213	22.7	4,018	17.5
Hertsmere	17,467	8,975	51.4	4,568	26.2	2,591	14.8	1,333	7.6
North Hertfordshire	38,417	12,592	32.8	10,446	27.2	11,903	31.0	3,476	9.0
St. Albans	41,345	12,246	29.6	18,013	43.6	5,937	14.4	5,149	12.5
Stevenage	20,039	6,366	31.8	2,872	14.3	8,800	43.9	2,001	10.0
Three Rivers	22,969	9,166	39.9	7,700	33.5	3,681	16.0	2,422	10.5
Watford	23,110	5,748	24.9	8,635	37.4	6,780	29.3	1,947	8.4
Welwyn Hatfield	26,622	10,265	38.6	8,482	31.9	5,399	20.3	2,476	9.3

=== Humberside Police ===
Winner of each local authority in the Humberside Police electoral area

2024 Humberside police and crime commissioner election
Party	Candidate	Votes	%	±%
Conservative	Jonathan Evison	51,083	39.7	−5.9
Labour Co-op	Simon O'Rourke	46,846	36.4	−3.0
Liberal Democrats	Bob Morgan	30,834	24.0	+8.9
Turnout		128,769	18.7	
Conservative hold		Swing		

==== Results by authority ====
District	Total votes	Conservative		Labour Co-op		Lib Dem	
District	Total votes	#	%	#	%	#	%
East Yorkshire	46,198	23,410	51.3	12,898	28.3	9,349	20.5
Hull	37,974	5,788	15.6	15,668	42.1	15,734	42.3
North East Lincolnshire	24,809	10,761	44.4	9,657	39.9	3,813	15.7
North Lincolnshire	21,885	11,124	51.3	8,623	39.8	1,938	8.9

=== Kent Police ===
Winner of each local authority in the Kent Police electoral area

2024 Kent police and crime commissioner election
Party	Candidate	Votes	%	±%
Conservative	Matthew Scott	120,491	44.1	−13.7
Labour Co-op	Lenny Rolles	92,508	33.9	+8.6
Liberal Democrats	Graham Colley	60,279	22.1	+5.1
Turnout		273,278		
Total votes				
Conservative hold		Swing		

==== Results by authority ====
District	Total votes	Conservative		Labour Co-op		Lib Dem	
District	Total votes	#	%	#	%	#	%
Ashford	18,384	8,746	47.6	6,209	33.8	3,429	18.7
Canterbury	21,806	8,175	37.5	8,869	40.7	4,762	21.8
Dartford	15,245	7,306	47.9	6,020	39.5	1,919	12.6
Dover	17,237	6,982	40.5	7,544	43.8	2,711	15.7
Folkeston & Hythe	17,080	7,554	44.2	5,851	34.3	3,675	21.5
Gravesham	13,823	5,675	41.1	6,483	46.9	1,665	12.0
Maidstone	38,170	17,403	45.6	9,815	25.7	10,952	28.7
Medway	30,893	12,695	41.1	13,275	43.0	4,923	15.9
Sevenoaks	17,825	9,539	53.5	3,739	21.0	4,547	25.5
Swale	15,922	6,975	43.8	5,789	36.4	3,158	19.8
Thanet	16,069	6,453	40.2	6,996	43.5	2,620	16.3
Tonbridge & Malling	19,585	10,354	52.9	4,894	25.0	4,337	22.1
Tunbridge Wells	31,239	12,634	40.4	7,024	22.5	11,581	37.1

=== Lancashire Constabulary ===
2024 Lancashire police and crime commissioner election
Party	Candidate	Votes	%	±%
Labour Co-op	Clive Grunshaw	135,638	47.1	+5.6
Conservative	Andrew Snowden	101,281	35.1	−9.6
Liberal Democrats	Neil Darby	51,252	17.8	+9.0
Turnout		297,705	26.2	
Rejected ballots		9,534	3.2	
Labour Co-op gain from Conservative		Swing		

==== Results by authority ====
District	Total votes	Labour Co-op		Conservative		Lib Dem	
District	Total votes	#	%	#	%	#	%
Blackburn with Darwen	29,763	12,886	43.3	7,377	24.8	9,500	31.9
Blackpool	25,690	15,115	58.8	8,246	32.1	2,329	9.1
Burnley	18,133	8,140	44.9	5,897	32.5	4,096	22.6
Chorley	25,704	13,831	53.8	8,786	34.2	3,087	12.0
Fylde	13,045	4,867	37.3	5,932	45.5	2,246	17.2
Hyndburn	17,160	8,225	47.9	6,552	38.2	2,383	13.9
Lancaster	20,667	10,916	52.8	6,646	32.2	3,105	15.0
Pendle	21,482	7,931	36.9	8,930	41.6	4,621	21.5
Preston	26,219	11,403	43.5	6,565	25.0	8,251	31.5
Ribble Valley	9,985	3,281	32.9	5,249	52.6	1,455	14.6
Rossendale	16,114	7,808	48.5	6,299	39.1	2,007	12.5
West Lancashire	25,241	13,450	53.3	8,833	35.0	2,958	11.7
Wyre	19,153	9,065	47.3	8,119	42.4	1,969	10.3
South Ribble	19,815	8,720	44.0	7,850	39.6	3,245	16.4

=== Leicestershire Police ===
Winner of each local authority in the Leicestershire Police electoral area

2024 Leicestershire police and crime commissioner election
Party	Candidate	Votes	%	±%
Conservative	Rupert Matthews	62,280	35.3	−14.0
Labour Co-op	Rory Palmer	61,420	34.8	+1.5
Green	Aasiya Bora	23,649	13.4	N/A
Liberal Democrats	Ian Sharpe	22,041	12.5	−5.0
One Leicester	Fizza Askari	7,104	4.0	N/A
Turnout		176,494	21.7	
Conservative hold		Swing		

==== Results by authority ====
District	Total votes	Conservative		Labour Co-op		Green		Lib Dem		One Leicester	
District	Total votes	#	%	#	%	#	%	#	%	#	%
Blaby	12,677	5,179	40.9	4,241	33.5	963	7.6	2,032	16.0	262	2.1
Charnwood	28,449	11,477	40.3	10,585	37.2	2,953	10.1	2,869	10.4	565	2.0
Harborough	16,428	7,121	43.3	5,049	30.7	1,180	7.2	2,840	17.3	238	1.4
Hinckley & Bosworth	17,353	6,373	36.7	3,971	22.9	921	5.3	5,877	33.9	211	1.2
Leicester	64,204	17,187	26.8	24,393	38.0	14,609	22.8	3,033	4.7	4,982	7.8
Melton	7,326	3,312	45.2	2,422	33.1	614	8.4	857	11.7	121	1.7
North West Leicestershire	15,204	5,745	37.8	6,465	42.5	964	6.3	1,804	11.9	226	1.5
Oadby & Wigston	9,359	3,185	34.0	2,853	30.5	1,076	11.5	1,803	19.3	442	4.7
Rutland	5,494	2,701	49.2	1,441	26.2	369	6.7	1,441	16.9	57	1.0

=== Lincolnshire Police ===
Winner of each local authority in the Lincolnshire Police electoral area

2024 Lincolnshire police and crime commissioner election
Party	Candidate	Votes	%	±%
Conservative	Marc Jones	39,639	36.5	−23.2
Labour	Mike Horder	31,931	29.5	+9.5
Reform	Peter Escreet	15,518	14.3	+10.8
Liberal Democrats	Lesley Rollings	13,380	12.4	+6.4
English Democrat	David Dickason	7,739	7.2	N/A
Turnout		108,207	19.09	
Conservative hold		Swing		

==== Results by authority ====
District	Total votes	Conservative		Labour		Reform UK		Lib Dem		Eng Dem	
District	Total votes	#	%	#	%	#	%	#	%	#	%
Boston	7,443	2,727	36.6	1,743	23.4	1,356	18.2	661	8.9	956	12.8
East Lindsey	18,686	7,323	39.2	4,869	26.1	3,277	17.5	1,667	8.9	1,550	8.3
Lincoln	17,900	4,695	26.2	8,041	44.9	1,605	9.0	2,782	15.5	777	4.3
North Kesteven	17,462	7,260	41.6	4,873	27.9	2,385	13.7	1,762	10.1	1,182	6.8
South Holland	10,949	4,558	41.6	2,593	23.7	1,844	16.8	986	9.0	968	8.8
South Kesteven	21,395	7,849	36.7	6,509	30.4	3,228	15.1	2,373	11.1	1,436	6.7
West Lindsey	14,372	5,227	36.4	3,303	23.0	1,823	12.7	3,149	21.9	870	6.1

=== Merseyside Police ===
2024 Merseyside police and crime commissioner election
Party	Candidate	Votes	%	±%
Labour Co-op	Emily Spurrell	152,640	61.7	+4.9
Conservative	Bob Teesdale	35,221	14.2	−8.6
Green	Amanda Onwuemene	31,330	12.7	N/A
Liberal Democrats	Christopher Carubia	28,093	11.4	−5.2
Turnout		251,600	23.9	−7.0
Rejected ballots		4,316	1.7	-1.8
Labour Co-op hold		Swing	6.7	

==== Results by authority ====
District	Total votes	Labour Co-op		Conservative		Green		Lib Dem	
District	Total votes	#	%	#	%	#	%	#	%
Knowsley	25,640	18,208	71.0	1,735	6.8	4,162	16.2	1,535	6.0
Liverpool	74,064	51,364	68.2	4,651	6.2	10,457	13.9	8,883	11.8
Sefton	60,265	35,872	59.5	12,939	21.5	5,345	8.9	6,109	10.1
St Helens	26,182	16,158	61.7	4,603	17.6	3,094	11.8	2,327	8.9
Wirral	59,842	31,038	51.9	11,293	18.9	8,272	13.8	9,239	15.4

=== Metropolitan Police ===
2024 London mayoral election
Party	Candidate	Votes	Of total (%)	± (pp), party
Labour	Sadiq Khan	1,088,225	43.8	+3.8
Conservative	Susan Hall	812,397	32.7	−2.6
Liberal Democrats	Rob Blackie	145,184	5.8	+1.4
Green	Zoë Garbett	145,114	5.8	−2.0
Reform	Howard Cox	78,865	3.1	New
Independent	Natalie Campbell	47,815	1.9	New
SDP	Amy Gallagher	34,449	1.4	+1.1
Animal Welfare	Femy Amin	29,280	1.2	New
Independent	Andreas Michli	26,121	1.1	New
Independent	Tarun Ghulati	24,702	1.0	New
Binface	Count Binface	24,260	1.0	0.0
Britain First	Nick Scanlon	20,519	0.8	New
London Real	Brian Rose	7,501	0.3	−0.9
Majority		276,008	11.1	
Rejected ballots		11,127	0.4	
Turnout		2,495,559	40.5	−1.5
Registered electors		6,162,428		
Labour hold				

=== Norfolk Constabulary ===
Winner of each local authority within the Norfolk Constabulary electoral area

2024 Norfolk police and crime commissioner election
Party	Candidate	Votes	%	±%
Labour Co-op	Sarah Taylor	52,445	35.2	+13.1
Conservative	Giles Orpen-Smellie	50,567	33.9	−11.2
Green	Martin Schmierer	23,628	15.8	+5.6
Liberal Democrats	John Crofts	22,525	15.1	+1.4
Turnout		149,165		
Labour Co-op gain from Conservative		Swing		

==== Results by authority ====
District	Total votes	Labour Co-op		Conservative		Green		Lib Dem	
District	Total votes	#	%	#	%	#	%	#	%
Breckland	18,126	6,171	34.0	7,519	41.5	2,048	11.3	2,388	13.2
Broadland	22,150	7,474	36.2	8,875	43.0	1,281	6.2	2,993	14.5
Great Yarmouth	12,115	5,002	41.3	4,854	40.1	1,281	10.6	978	8.1
King's Lynn & West Norfolk	19,215	5,452	28.4	7,600	39.6	1,675	8.7	4,488	23.4
North Norfolk	17,522	3,729	27.0	7,066	51.2	1,676	12.2	5,051	36.6
Norwich	35,838	16,491	46.0	5,654	15.8	10,283	28.7	3,410	9.5
South Norfolk	24,199	8,126	33.6	8,999	37.2	3,857	15.9	3,217	13.3

=== North Yorkshire Police ===
2024 York & North Yorkshire mayoral election
Party	Candidate	Votes	%	±%
Labour Co-op	David Skaith	66,761	35.1	N/A
Conservative	Keane Duncan	51,967	27.3	N/A
Liberal Democrats	Felicity Cunliffe-Lister	30,867	16.2	N/A
Green	Kevin Foster	15,188	8.0	N/A
Independent	Keith Tordoff	13,250	7.0	N/A
Independent	Paul Haslam	12,370	6.5	N/A
Majority		14,794	7.8	N/A
Turnout		191,279	29.89	N/A

=== Northamptonshire Police ===
2024 Northamptonshire police, fire and crime commissioner election
Party	Candidate	Votes	%	±%
Labour Co-op	Danielle Stone	43,684	39.3	+11.8
Conservative	Martyn Emberson	39,714	35.7	−17.5
Liberal Democrats	Ana Savage Gunn	27,799	25.0	+9.7
Turnout		111,197	19.6	−15.2
Labour Co-op gain from Conservative		Swing	14.6	

==== Results by authority ====
District	Total votes	Labour Co-op		Conservative		Lib Dem	
District	Total votes	#	%	#	%	#	%
North Northamptonshire	48,270	20,148	41.7	17,729	36.7	10,393	21.5
West Northamptonshire	62,927	23,536	37.4	21,985	34.9	17,406	27.7

=== Northumbria Police ===
2024 Northumbria police and crime commissioner election
Party	Candidate	Votes	%	±%
Labour Co-op	Susan Dungworth	176,311	51.0	+4.4
Conservative	Ros Munro	78,818	22.8	−8.0
Liberal Democrats	John Appleby	58,574	17.0	+6.4
Independent	Mustaque Rahman	31,773	9.2	N/A
Turnout		345,476	33.0	−4.0
Labour Co-op hold		Swing		

==== Results by authority ====
District	Total votes	Labour Co-op		Conservative		Liberal Democrat		Independent	
District	Total votes	#	%	#	%	#	%	#	%
Gateshead	48,654	26,478	54.4	8,806	18.1	10,323	21.2	3,047	6.3
Newcastle upon Tyne	69,093	35,119	50.8	10,850	15.7	14,227	20.6	8,897	12.9
North Tyneside	57,816	31,166	53.9	13,934	24.1	8,203	14.2	4,513	7.8
Northumberland	71,661	33,756	47.1	22,467	31.4	9,552	13.3	5,886	8.2
South Tyneside	35,711	17,328	48.5	6,941	19.4	5,479	15.3	5,963	16.7
Sunderland	62,541	32,464	51.9	15,820	25.3	10,790	17.3	3,467	5.5

=== Nottinghamshire Police ===
2024 Nottinghamshire police and crime commissioner election
Party	Candidate	Votes	%	±%
Labour Co-op	Gary Godden	119,355	52.1	+8.6
Conservative	Caroline Henry	77,148	33.7	−14.2
Liberal Democrats	David Watts	32,410	14.2	+5.5
Turnout		234,266	28.1	
Labour Co-op gain from Conservative		Swing		

==== Results by authority ====
District	Total votes	Labour Co-op		Conservative		Lib Dem	
District	Total votes	#	%	#	%	#	%
Ashfield	21,323	10,237	48.0	7,757	36.4	3,329	15.6
Bassetlaw	21,772	11,180	51.4	8,268	38.0	2,324	10.7
Broxtowe	29,047	14,984	51.6	8,229	28.3	5,834	20.1
Gedling	26,806	14,519	54.2	8,981	33.5	3,306	12.3
Mansfield	20,006	10,114	50.6	7,757	38.8	2,135	10.7
Newark & Sherwood	26,231	11,282	43.0	11,246	42.9	3,703	14.1
Nottingham	49,459	31,108	62.9	11,330	22.9	7,021	14.2
Rushcliffe	34,269	15,931	46.5	13,580	39.6	4,758	13.9

=== South Yorkshire Police ===
2024 South Yorkshire mayoral election
Party	Candidate	Votes	%	±%
Labour Co-op	Oliver Coppard	138,611	50.9	+7.8
Conservative	Nick Allen	44,948	16.5	±0.0
Green	Douglas Johnson	37,142	13.6	+4.1
Liberal Democrats	Hannah Kitching	31,002	11.4	+0.6
SDP	David Bettney	20,835	7.6	+3.7
Majority		93,666	34.4	+7.8
Turnout		272,535	27.3	+0.9
Labour Co-op hold		Swing	+3.9	

==== Result by authority ====
Districts	Oliver Coppard Lab Co-op		Nick Allen Con		Douglas Johnson Green		Hannah Kitching Lib Dems		David Bettney SDP		Total valid votes
Districts	#	%	#	%	#	%	#	%	#	%	#
Barnsley	21,896	49.80%	5,708	12.98%	3,504	7.97%	7,958	18.10%	4,899	11.14%	43,965
Doncaster	24,111	50.95%	13,587	28.71%	2,831	5.98%	2,039	4.31%	4,754	10.05%	47,322
Rotherham	25,642	46.68%	13,568	24.70%	6,228	11.34%	4,755	8.66%	4,739	8.63%	54,932
Sheffield	66,962	53.01%	12,085	9.57%	24,579	19.46%	16,250	12.86%	6,443	5.10%	126,319
Totals	138,611	50.86%	44,948	16.49%	37,142	13.63%	31,002	11.38%	20,835	7.64%	272,538

=== Staffordshire Police ===
2024 Staffordshire police, fire and crime commissioner election
Party	Candidate	Votes	%	±%
Conservative	Ben Adams	73,500	45.6	−10.1
Labour Co-op	Alastair Watson	70,128	43.5	+16.0
Liberal Democrats	Alec Sandiford	17,666	11.0	+6.6
Turnout		161,294	19.2	
Conservative hold		Swing		

==== Result by authority ====
District	Total votes	Conservative		Labour Co-op		Lib Dem	
District	Total votes	#	%	#	%	#	%
Cannock Chase	18,710	8,151	43.6	8,747	46.8	1,812	9.7
East Staffordshire	15,844	7,732	48.8	6,299	39.8	1,813	11.4
Lichfield	16,481	6,406	51.0	6,232	37.8	1,843	11.2
Newcastle-under-Lyme	17,916	7,669	42.8	8,460	47.2	1,787	10.0
South Staffordshire	18,087	11,526	63.7	5,003	27.7	1,558	8.6
Stafford	20,085	9,156	45.6	8,458	42.1	2,471	12.3
Staffordshire Moorlands	13,418	6,340	47.2	5,198	38.7	1,880	14.0
Stoke-on-Trent	27,214	9,684	35.6	14,301	52.6	3,229	11.9
Tamworth	15,539	6,836	44.0	7,430	47.8	1,273	8.2

=== Suffolk Constabulary ===
Winner of each local authority within the Suffolk Police electoral area

2024 Suffolk police and crime commissioner election
Party	Candidate	Votes	%	±%
Conservative	Tim Passmore	52,968	40.2	−14.5
Labour Co-op	Robin Wales	41,734	31.7	+8.7
Green	Rachel Smith-Lyte	22,488	17.1	+3.5
Liberal Democrats	James Sandbach	14,541	11.0	+2.3
Turnout		131,731	22.9	
Conservative hold		Swing		

==== Result by authority ====
District	Total votes	Conservative		Labour Co-op		Green		Lib Dem	
District	Total votes	#	%	#	%	#	%	#	%
Babergh	15,047	6,717	44.6	4,087	27.2	2,430	16.1	1,813	12.0
East Suffolk	41,971	17,211	41.0	11,936	28.4	8,003	19.1	4,821	11.5
Ipswich	30,558	11,050	36.2	13,040	42.7	3,564	11.7	2,904	9.5
Mid Suffolk	18,781	7,188	38.3	4,668	24.9	4,864	25.9	2,061	11.0
West Suffolk	25,374	10,802	42.6	8,003	31.5	3,627	14.3	2,942	11.6

=== Surrey Police ===
Winner of each local authority within the Surrey Police electoral area

2024 Surrey police and crime commissioner election
Party	Candidate	Votes	%	±%
Conservative	Lisa Townsend	95,538	36.4	+2.9
Liberal Democrats	Paul Kennedy	82,213	31.3	+10.6
Labour	Kate Chinn	42,813	16.3	+0.4
Independent	Alex Coley	42,052	16.0	N/A
Turnout		265,682	29.9	−8.9
Rejected ballots		3,066	1.2	
Conservative hold		Swing		

==== Results by authority ====
District	Total votes	Conservative		Lib Dem		Labour Co-op		Ind	
District	Total votes	#	%	#	%	#	%	#	%
Elmbridge	38,227	15,052	39.4	14,411	37.7	3,942	10.3	4,822	12.6
Epsom and Ewell	14,049	4,116	29.3	3,807	27.1	2,884	20.5	3,242	23.1
Guildford	23,899	8,953	37.5	7,911	33.1	3,429	14.3	3,606	15.1
Mole Valley	26,451	8,011	30.3	12,383	46.8	2,488	9.4	3,569	13.5
Reigate & Banstead	37,312	14,548	39.0	7,917	21.2	8,738	23.4	6,109	16.4
Runnymede	18,655	7,026	37.6	3,761	20.2	4,674	25.1	3,194	17.1
Spelthorne	35,104	13,124	37.4	7,349	20.9	8,770	25.0	5,861	16.7
Surrey Heath	13,743	5,743	41.8	4,004	29.1	1,693	12.3	2,303	16.8
Tandridge	22,864	9,012	39.4	5,148	22.5	3,758	16.4	4,946	21.6
Waverley	23,097	9,388	40.6	6,789	29.4	3,068	13.3	3,852	16.7
Woking	27,870	7,591	27.2	12,494	44.8	4,043	14.5	3,742	13.4

=== Sussex Police ===
Winner of each local authority within the Sussex Police electoral area

2024 Sussex police and crime commissioner election
Party	Candidate	Votes	%	±%
Conservative	Katy Bourne	122,495	39.0	−8.2
Labour Co-op	Paul Richards	99,502	31.7	+13.1
Liberal Democrats	Jamie Bennett	48,923	15.6	+1.7
Green	Jonathan Kent	43,105	13.7	+0.4
Turnout		317,718	24.5	−11.2
Rejected ballots		3,693	1.2	
Conservative hold		Swing		

==== Results by authority ====
District	Total votes	Conservative		Labour Co-op		Lib Dem		Green	
District	Total votes	#	%	#	%	#	%	#	%
Adur	16,651	5,761	34.6	7,788	46.8	1,322	7.9	1,780	10.7
Arun	27,569	13,429	48.7	6,932	25.1	4,044	14.7	3,164	11.5
Brighton & Hove	44,601	10,308	23.1	22,053	49.4	3,198	7.2	9,042	20.3
Chichester	20,381	9,008	44.2	3,154	15.5	6,257	30.7	1,962	9.6
Crawley	25,205	9,717	38.6	10,797	42.8	1,843	7.3	2,848	11.3
Eastbourne	16,606	7,036	42.4	3,012	18.1	5,349	32.2	1,209	7.3
Hastings	23,427	6,326	27.0	9,023	38.5	1,342	5.7	6,736	28.8
Horsham	23,791	11,530	48.5	4,569	19.2	5,357	22.5	2,335	9.8
Lewes	17,912	6,456	36.0	4,878	27.2	4,326	24.2	2,252	12.6
Mid Sussex	25,756	11,429	44.4	5,663	22.0	6,151	23.9	2,513	9.8
Rother	15,720	7,614	48.4	4,329	27.5	1,803	11.5	1,974	12.6
Wealden	27,839	13,704	49.2	5,659	20.3	4,640	16.7	3,836	13.8
Worthing	28,180	10,177	36.1	11,645	41.3	2,931	10.4	3,427	12.2

=== Thames Valley Police ===
Winner of each local authority in the Thames Valley Police electoral area

2024 Thames Valley police and crime commissioner election
Party	Candidate	Votes	%	±%
Conservative	Matthew Barber	144,092	32.1	−10.4
Labour Co-op	Tim Starkey	141,749	31.6	+3.8
Liberal Democrats	Tim Bearder	84,341	18.8	+1.3
More Police Officers for Thames Valley	Ben Holden-Crowther	46,853	10.4	N/A
Independent	Russell Douglas Fowler	31,460	7.0	N/A
Turnout		448,495		
Conservative hold		Swing	-7.1	

==== Results by authority ====
District	Total votes	Conservative		Labour Co-op		Lib Dem		Ind Holden-Crowther		Ind Fowler	
District	Total votes	#	%	#	%	#	%	#	%	#	%
Bracknell Forest	14,381	5,295	36.8	4,795	33.3	1,565	10.9	1,734	12.1	992	6.9
Buckinghamshire	76,278	28,706	37.6	21,403	28.1	12,372	16.2	7,876	10.3	5,921	7.8
Cherwell	35,343	11,271	31.9	9,774	27.7	8,141	23.0	3,644	10.3	2,513	7.1
Milton Keynes	60,159	18,833	31.3	23,647	39.3	7,585	12.6	6,752	11.2	3,342	5.6
Oxford	37,802	4,818	12.7	18,228	48.2	7,045	18.6	3,180	8.4	4,531	12.0
Reading	37,327	8,530	22.9	18,299	49.0	4,021	10.8	4,336	11.6	2,141	5.7
Slough	16,336	4,747	29.1	7,067	43.3	1,456	8.9	1,932	11.8	1,134	6.9
South Oxfordshire	24,227	8,085	33.4	6,142	25.4	6,410	26.5	2,006	8.3	1,584	6.5
Vale of White Horse	23,336	8,152	34.9	5,779	24.8	6,338	27.2	1,681	7.2	1,386	5.9
West Berkshire	23,751	9,362	39.4	5,276	22.2	4,767	20.1	2,704	11.4	1,642	6.9
West Oxfordshire	28,809	10,590	36.8	7,063	24.5	7,177	24.9	2,425	8.4	1,554	5.4
Windsor & Maidenhead	18,828	6,592	35.0	4,204	22.3	4,516	24.0	2,011	10.7	1,505	8.0
Wokingham	51,918	19,111	36.8	10,072	19.4	12,948	24.9	6,572	12.7	3,215	6.2

=== Warwickshire Police ===
2024 Warwickshire police and crime commissioner election
Party	Candidate	Votes	%	±%
Conservative	Philip Seccombe	45,638	39.4	−12.7
Labour Co-op	Sarah Feeney	45,377	39.2	+11.5
Liberal Democrats	Richard Dickson	24,867	21.5	+5.3
Turnout		117,518	26.0	
Rejected ballots		1,636	1.4	
Conservative hold		Swing		

==== Result by authority ====
District	Total votes	Conservative		Labour Co-op		Lib Dem	
District	Total votes	#	%	#	%	#	%
North Warwickshire	8,430	3,766	44.7	3,651	43.3	1,013	12.0
Nuneaton & Bedworth	27,123	11,485	42.3	12,360	45.6	3,278	12.1
Rugby	26,757	9,599	35.9	11,667	43.6	5,491	20.5
Stratford-on-Avon	26,138	11,763	45.0	5,701	21.8	8,674	33.2
Warwick	27,434	9,025	32.9	11,998	43.7	6,411	23.4

=== West Mercia Police ===
Winner of each local authority in the West Mercia Police electoral area

2024 West Mercia police and crime commissioner election
Party	Candidate	Votes	%	±%
Conservative	John-Paul Campion	73,395	34.3	−21.0
Labour Co-op	Richard Overton	63,082	29.5	+5.5
Liberal Democrats	Sarah Murray	33,782	15.8	+0.2
Green	Julian Dean	22,021	10.3	N/A
English Democrat	Henry Curteis	21,645	10.1	N/A
Turnout		213,925		
Conservative hold		Swing		

==== Results by authority ====
District	Total votes	Conservative		Labour Co-op		Lib Dem		Green		Eng Dem	
District	Total votes	#	%	#	%	#	%	#	%	#	%
Bromsgrove	15,235	6,299	41.3	4,326	28.4	2,196	14.4	950	6.2	1,464	9.6
Herefordshire	26,452	9,563	36.2	5,553	21.0	4,539	17.2	3,922	14.8	2,875	10.9
Malvern Hills	13,153	4,722	35.9	2,912	22.1	2,521	19.2	1,590	12.1	1,408	10.7
Redditch	18,587	6,822	36.7	7,631	41.1	1,235	6.6	1,451	7.8	1,448	7.8
Shropshire	44,645	14,361	32.2	11,413	25.6	10,130	22.7	3,521	7.9	5,220	11.7
Telford & Wrekin	30,252	9,138	30.2	12,963	42.9	2,870	9.5	1,918	6.3	3,363	11.1
Worcester	25,825	6,466	25.0	8,323	32.2	4,049	15.7	5,418	21.0	1,569	6.1
Wychavon	21,954	9,222	42.0	4,656	21.2	3,996	18.2	1,828	8.3	2,252	10.3
Wyre Forest	17,822	6,802	38.2	5,305	29.8	2,246	12.6	1,423	8.0	2,046	11.5

=== West Midlands Police ===
Winner of each local authority in the West Midlands Police electoral area

2024 West Midlands police and crime commissioner election
Party	Candidate	Votes	%	±%
Labour	Simon Foster	327,844	57.5	+12.0
Conservative	Tom Byrne	241,827	42.5	+3.1
Turnout		595,218	29.5	
Rejected ballots		23,663	4.0	
Labour hold		Swing		

==== Results by authority ====
District	Total votes	Labour		Conservative	
District	Total votes	#	%	#	%
Birmingham	203,429	125,631	61.8	77,798	38.2
Coventry	68,003	43,014	63.3	24,989	36.7
Dudley	72,940	35,506	48.7	37,434	51.3
Sandwell	63,242	42,396	67.0	20,846	33.0
Solihull	54,343	21,184	39.0	33,159	61.0
Walsall	54,879	28,141	51.3	26,738	48.7
Wolverhampton	52,835	31,972	60.5	20,863	39.5

=== West Yorkshire Police ===
2024 West Yorkshire mayoral election
Party	Candidate	Votes	%	±%
Labour Co-op	Tracy Brabin	275,430	50.4	+7.4
Conservative	Arnold Craven	82,757	15.1	−13.8
Green	Andrew Cooper	66,648	12.2	+3.0
Yorkshire	Bob Buxton	47,937	8.8	−0.9
Independent	Richard Tilt	46,443	8.5	New
Liberal Democrats	Stewart Golton	27,501	5.0	+0.1
Majority		192,673	35.2	+21.3
Turnout		546,716	32.7	−0.4
Labour Co-op hold		Swing	+10.6	

==== Results by authority ====
2024 West Yorkshire mayoral election
Districts	Tracy Brabin Lab		Arnold Craven Con		Andrew Cooper Green		Bob Buxton Yorkshire		Richard Tilt Independent		Stewart Golton Lib Dems		Total valid votes
Districts	#	%	#	%	#	%	#	%	#	%	#	%	#
Bradford	55,878	44.73%	19,206	15.38%	14,394	11.52%	9,791	7.84%	19,889	15.92%	5,758	4.61%	124,916
Calderdale	27,228	53.08%	8,641	16.85%	6,070	11.83%	4,155	8.10%	3,205	6.25%	1,995	3.89%	51,294
Kirklees	47,897	43.67%	17,690	16.13%	19,296	17.59%	7,944	7.24%	12,138	11.07%	4,713	4.30%	109,678
Leeds	107,011	54.83%	26,563	13.61%	22,097	11.32%	19,062	9.77%	7,479	3.83%	12,971	6.65%	195,183
Wakefield	37,416	57.00%	10,657	16.23%	4,791	7.30%	6,985	10.64%	3,732	5.69%	2,064	3.14%	65,645
Totals	275,430	50.38%	82,757	15.14%	66,648	12.19%	47,937	8.77%	46,443	8.49%	27,501	5.03%	546,716

=== Wiltshire Police ===
Winner of each local authority within the Wiltshire Police electoral area

2024 Wiltshire police and crime commissioner election
Party	Candidate	Votes	%	±%
Conservative	Philip Wilkinson	38,578	31.0	−5.0
Labour Co-op	Stanka Adamcova	36,345	29.2	+14.9
Independent	Mike Rees	29,035	23.3	−4.5
Liberal Democrats	Alan Hagger	20,485	16.5	−3.3
Turnout		125,927	22.7	+6.1
Conservative hold				

==== Results by authority ====
District	Total votes	Conservative		Labour Co-op		Ind		Lib Dem	
District	Total votes	#	%	#	%	#	%	#	%
Swindon	51,351	14,075	27.4	24,230	47.2	9,281	18.1	3,765	7.3
Wiltshire	73,092	24,503	33.5	12,115	16.6	19,754	27.0	16,720	22.9

== Wales ==
=== Dyfed-Powys Police ===
2024 Dyfed-Powys police and crime commissioner election
Party	Candidate	Votes	%	±%
Plaid Cymru	Dafydd Llywelyn	31,323	40.9	+7.3
Conservative	Ian Harrison	19,134	25.0	−9.0
Labour Co-op	Philippa Thompson	18,353	24.0	+0.3
Liberal Democrats	Justin Griffiths	7,719	10.1	+1.4
Turnout		76,529		
Plaid Cymru hold		Swing		

==== Results by authority ====
District	Total votes	Plaid Cymru		Conservative		Labour Co-op		Lib Dem	
District	Total votes	#	%	#	%	#	%	#	%
Carmarthenshire	29,595	14,739	49.8	5,430	18.3	7,395	25.0	2,031	6.9
Ceredigion	12,140	7,146	58.9	1,971	16.2	1,716	14.1	1,307	10.8
Pembrokeshire	16,406	4,643	28.9	5,168	32.2	5,386	33.6	1,209	7.5
Powys	18,388	4,795	26.1	6,565	35.7	3,856	21.0	3,172	17.3

=== Gwent Police ===
2024 Gwent police and crime commissioner election
Party	Candidate	Votes	%	±%
Labour Co-op	Jane Mudd	28,476	41.7	−0.1
Conservative	Hannah Jarvis	21,919	32.1	+3.2
Plaid Cymru	Donna Cushing	9,864	14.4	−1.8
Liberal Democrats	Mike Hamilton	8,078	11.8	+7.6
Turnout		68,337		
Labour Co-op hold		Swing		

==== Results by authority ====
District	Total votes	Labour Co-op		Conservative		Plaid Cymru		Lib Dem	
District	Total votes	#	%	#	%	#	%	#	%
Blaenau Gwent	6,038	3,057	50.6	1,362	22.6	1,065	17.6	554	9.2
Caerphilly	18,191	7,635	42.0	4,518	24.8	4,315	23.7	1,723	9.5
Monmouthshire	15,420	5,744	37.3	6,653	43.1	1,168	7.6	1,855	12.0
Newport	19,142	7,905	41.3	6,382	33.3	2,032	10.6	2,823	14.7
Torfaen	9,546	4,135	43.3	3,004	31.5	1,284	13.5	1,123	11.8

=== North Wales Police ===
2024 North Wales police and crime commissioner election
Party	Candidate	Votes	%	±%
Labour Co-op	Andy Dunbobbin	31,950	36.0	+6.9
Conservative	Brian Jones	26,281	29.6	−2.0
Plaid Cymru	Ann Griffith	23,466	26.4	−2.0
Liberal Democrats	Richard Marbrow	7,129	8.0	+3.7
Turnout		88,826		
Labour Co-op hold		Swing		

==== Results by authority ====
District	Total votes	Labour Co-op		Conservative		Plaid Cymru		Lib Dem	
District	Total votes	#	%	#	%	#	%	#	%
Conwy	15,785	5,650	35.8	5,955	37.7	3,198	20.3	982	6.2
Denbighshire	13,469	5,017	37.2	5,473	40.6	2,173	16.1	806	6.0
Flintshire	18,955	8,271	43.6	5,722	30.2	2,093	11.0	2,869	15.1
Gwynedd	15,937	3,892	24.4	2,330	14.6	9,058	56.8	657	4.1
Isle of Anglesey	10,146	2,790	27.5	2,804	27.6	4,135	40.8	417	4.1
Wrexham	14,534	6,330	43.6	3,997	27.5	2,809	19.3	1,398	9.6

=== South Wales Police ===
2024 South Wales police and crime commissioner election
Party	Candidate	Votes	%	±%
Labour Co-op	Emma Wools	73,128	45.2	+4.2
Conservative	George Carroll	43,344	26.8	+2.5
Plaid Cymru	Dennis Clarke	27,410	16.9	−2.1
Liberal Democrats	Sam Bennett	17,908	11.1	+6.5
Turnout		161,790		
Labour Co-op hold		Swing		

==== Results by authority ====
District	Total votes	Labour Co-op		Conservative		Plaid Cymru		Lib Dem	
District	Total votes	#	%	#	%	#	%	#	%
Bridgend	16,069	7,375	45.9	4,758	29.6	2,453	15.3	1,483	9.2
Cardiff	46,863	20,777	44.3	12,049	25.7	7,668	16.4	6,369	13.6
Merthyr Tydfil	5,439	2,910	53.5	1,086	20.0	982	18.1	461	8.5
Neath Port Talbot	18,570	9,074	48.9	3,866	20.8	3,922	21.1	1,708	9.2
Rhondda Cynon Taf	23,595	11,109	47.1	5,531	23.4	4,928	20.9	2,027	8.6
Swansea	29,384	13,869	47.2	7,624	25.9	3,765	12.8	4,126	14.0
Vale of Glamorgan	21,870	8,014	36.6	8,430	38.5	3,692	16.9	1,734	7.9
