= Gloucestershire Constabulary =

English territorial police force

Agency overview
- Formed: 1839; 187 years ago
- Employees: 2,377 (Sept 2023)
- Volunteers: 346 Police Support Volunteers (Sept 2023)
- Annual budget: £107.2 million (as of 2017–18)

Jurisdictional structure
- Operations jurisdiction: Gloucestershire, England, UK
- Map of police area
- Area: 1,024 square miles (2,650 km^{2})
- Population: 637,000
- Legal jurisdiction: England & Wales
- Constituting instrument: Police Act 1996
- General nature: Local civilian police

Operational structure
- Overseen by: His Majesty's Inspectorate of Constabulary and Fire & Rescue Services; Independent Office for Police Conduct
- Headquarters: Quedgeley, Gloucester
- Constables: 1301, and 114 special constables (Sept 2023)
- Police community support officers: 119 (Sept 2023)
- Police and crime commissioner responsible: Chris Nelson
- Agency executive: Maggie Blyth, Temporary chief constable
- Local Policing Areas: Forest and Gloucester; Cheltenham and Tewkesbury; Cotswolds and Stroud

Website
- www.gloucestershire.police.uk

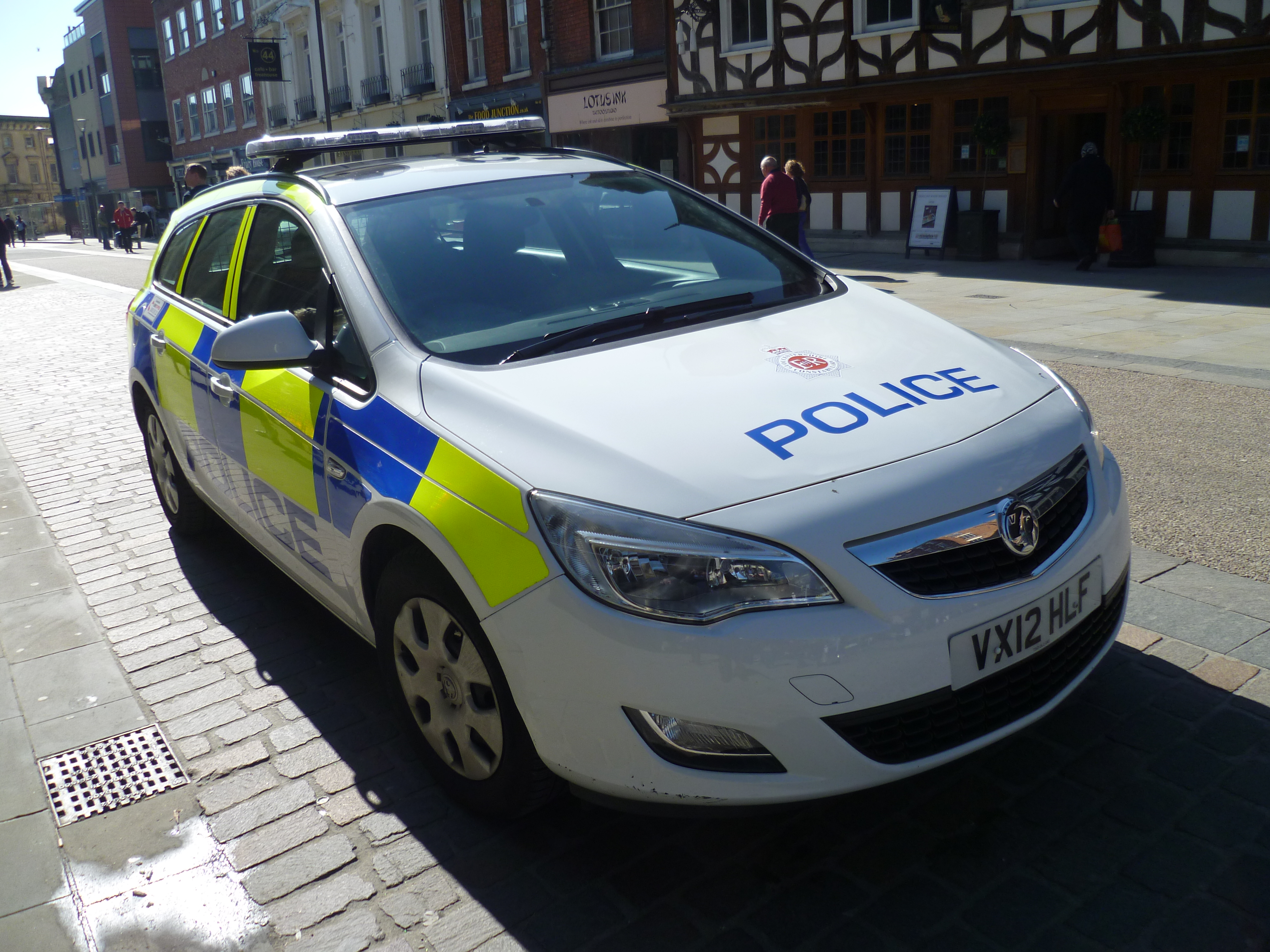
Gloucestershire Constabulary vehicle pictured in 2016

Gloucestershire Constabulary is the territorial police force responsible for policing the non-metropolitan county of Gloucestershire in South West England.

The force formerly covered the area of South Gloucestershire, however this was transformed to the newly formed Avon and Somerset Constabulary in 1974.

== History ==
The force was founded in 1839, six hours after Wiltshire Constabulary, making it the second rural police force formed in Britain. The force in its present form dates from 1 April 1974, when the southern part of Gloucestershire became part of the County of Avon and thus covered by the newly formed Avon and Somerset Constabulary.

In 1965, the force had an establishment of 1,010 and an actual strength of 867.

Between 2010 and 2019, the force lost 238 officers due to Government budget cuts.

From 2013 to 2019, specialist teams – roads, firearms and police dogs – operated in a "tri-force" collaboration with the Avon and Somerset, and Wiltshire forces. In April 2019, this arrangement was ended by the Gloucestershire Police and Crime Commissioner, Martin Surl, following Avon and Somerset Police withdrawing from the alliance.

In 2019, Her Majesty's Inspectorate of Constabulary and Fire & Rescue Services rated the force as 'inadequate' for crime reporting arrangements, after finding that over 7,900 incidents of crime in the county per year, and only 69.2% of violent crimes were recorded accurately. The inspection also found 38% of victims were not informed when crime reports were cancelled.

In 2020, the force opened a new £6.8 million police academy, the Sabrina Centre, on the grounds of the former Berkeley Nuclear Power Station. This coincided with the force offering new Police Constable Degree Apprenticeships in partnership with the University of South Wales.

=== Chief constables ===
- 1839–1865: Anthony Thomas Lefroy (first Chief Constable of Glos)
- 1865–1910: Admiral Henry Christian
- 1910–1917: Lieutenant Colonel Richard Chester-Master (killed in action 1917)
- 1918–1937: Major F.L. Stanley Clarke
- 1937–1959: Colonel William Francis Henn
- 1959–1962: John Gaskain
- 1963–1975: Edwin White
- 1975–1979: Brian Weigh
- 1979–1987: Leonard Soper
- 1987–1993: Albert Pacey
- 1993–2001: Anthony J.P. Butler
- 2001–2010: Timothy Brain
- 2010–2012: Tony Melville
- 2012–2013: Michael Matthews
- 2013–2017: Suzette Davenport
- 2017–2026 Rod Hansen
- 2024-present: Maggie Blyth (temporary)

=== Officers killed in the line of duty ===
The Police Roll of Honour Trust and Police Memorial Trust list and commemorate all British police officers killed in the line of duty. Since its establishment in 1984, the Police Memorial Trust has erected 50 memorials nationally to some of those officers.

Since 1817 the following officers of Gloucestershire Constabulary were killed while attempting to prevent or stop a crime in progress:

- Parish constable Henry Thompson, 1817 (shot by men attempting to free a prisoner)
- Police sergeant Samuel Beard, 1861 (died from injuries sustained attempting to arrest poachers)
- Police sergeant William Morris, 1895 (fatally injured by men he warned about their conduct)

== Operations ==
The force serves 637,000 people over an area of 1,024 square miles (2,650 km^{2}). and covers a number of royal residences, as well as Cheltenham Racecourse and the headquarters of GCHQ.

As of September 2023, the force consisted of 1,301 police officers, 119 police community support officers, 114 special constables and 397 police support volunteers.

Day-to-day policing in the county is split into 55 local communities, organised by three Local Policing Areas each overseen by a superintendent: Cheltenham and Tewkesbury, Gloucester and the Forest of Dean, and Cotswolds and Stroud. Each of these areas contains a Local Policing Team, providing an initial response to incidents, as well as a Neighbourhood Policing Team, which manage local concerns.

=== Special Constabulary ===
As of March 2020, the force had 113 special constables, who are mainly embedded in the Local Policing Teams and Neighbourhood Policing teams. A number of officers have been upskilled in rural crime and the use of 4x4 off-road vehicles to enhance the force's capability in this area.

=== Mounted unit ===
Gloucestershire Constabulary introduced a mounted police unit based at Highnam Court for a trial period in 2016, following the conclusion of an eighteen-month study in 2014 by both the University of Oxford and the RAND Corporation. The study surveyed whether the presence of mounted police on regular neighbourhood patrols would improve community engagement with the police, with results showing that members of the public were six times as likely to engage with police on horseback compared to police on foot patrol.

Two horses were initially acquired by Gloucestershire Constabulary from the Metropolitan Police's Mounted Section for the trial unit in 2016, the first horses owned by the force since the 1940s, with the section growing to four horses and three mounted officers by the time the trial concluded in August 2017. The force opted to retain the Mounted Section following the trial; in December 2021, the unit was retained again following a review by Gloucestershire Police and Crime Commissioner Chris Nelson into the cost and overall effectiveness of the unit, which had grown to consist of six horses when the review was undertaken.

== PEEL inspection ==
Her Majesty's Inspectorate of Constabulary and Fire & Rescue Services (HMICFRS) conducts a periodic police effectiveness, efficiency and legitimacy (PEEL) inspection of each police service's performance. In its latest PEEL inspection, Gloucestershire Constabulary was rated as follows:

	Outstanding	Good	Adequate	Requires Improvement	Inadequate
2021 rating		Preventing crime; Treatment of the public; Disrupting serious organised crime; Developing a positive workplace	Managing offenders		Investigating crime; Supporting victims; Recording data about crime; Responding to the public; Protecting vulnerable people; Good use of resources

Following the 2021 report, HMICFRS reinspected the force in July 2023. They found the force was still inadequate in the area of "Responding to the Public", however had improved in all other areas previously found "Inadequate".

== Investigations ==
In 2015, Gloucestershire police were able to show using biomechanical evidence that Robert Nowak was the driver of a car involved in a crash in 2013 in which his friend Michal Sobolak was killed. Nowak was sentenced to ten years imprisonment and seven years' disqualification from driving for Causing Death by Dangerous Driving, Conspiring to Pervert the Course of Justice and Driving whilst Disqualified.

== Controversies ==
=== Discrimination ===
In November 2006, a tribunal ruled that the constabulary had illegally discriminated against 108 white male candidates it had rejected from its recruitment process solely because of their race and sex in trying to reach government targets for hiring underrepresented groups. Matt Powell, one of the "randomly deselected" candidates, took legal action and was awarded £2,500 compensation. The Commission for Racial Equality (CRE) and the Equal Opportunities Commission who led the investigation stated that the Gloucestershire Police had unlawfully discriminated on the grounds of race and sex. The same illegal policy was also used by Avon and Somerset Constabulary.

=== Terrorism ===
A serving Gloucestershire Police officer was arrested on 12 November 2024 by Counter Terrorism Policing South West (CTPSW) officers on suspicion of providing support to a proscribed organisation, namely Hamas, under Section 12 of the Terrorism Act 2000. The constable has been suspended from all duties by the force and the investigation remains ongoing.

== See also ==
- Law enforcement in the United Kingdom
- List of law enforcement agencies in the United Kingdom, Crown Dependencies and British Overseas Territories
