= Martin Surl =

Gloucestershire Police and Crime Commissioner
- In office 22 November 2012 – 12 May 2021
- Preceded by: Office created
- Succeeded by: Chris Nelson

Personal details
- Born: March 1957 (age 69)
- Party: Independent; Liberal Democrats

Martin John Surl (born March 1957) is a retired British police officer and consultant who served as the Independent Gloucestershire Police and Crime Commissioner from 2012 to 2021. The first person to hold the post, he was elected on 15 November 2012. He was reelected in 2016. He was defeated by the Conservative Party candidate in 2021, finishing third behind the Liberal Democrats.

Born and raised in Gloucestershire, Surl joined the Gloucestershire Constabulary in May 1980. He later became a detective and was promoted to Superintendent in 2000. In 2001 he was seconded to the Estonian Ministry of Justice to help modernise that country's police service and develop crime reduction partnerships.

In 2005, Surl received the Estonian Order of Merit in recognition of his work to introduce child protection measures.

In 2006, Surl became a Director of Baltic Leisure Enterprises Limited.

In 2007, he was seconded to the Association of Chief Police Officers, Terrorism and Allied Matters branch (ACPO, TAM) to help set up the UK's policing anti-terrorism network.

In 2012 Surl beat Victoria Atkins (Conservative) and two other candidates for the Gloucestershire Police and Crime Commission. Atkins won on first preference votes, but Surl won the second preferences that were allocated. He was reelected on 5 May 2016 to another four-year term.

In 2013, Surl proposed and eventually received a 2% increase in the police budget in order to tackle cyber bullying and online fraud.

In 2021, Surl came third in the PCC elections and subsequently lost his position as the Gloucestershire Police and Crime Commissioner.

In the 2024 England and Wales police and crime commissioner elections, Surl was the Liberal Democrat candidate but was narrowly defeated by Chris Nelson.
