= Suzette Davenport =

Retired chief constable

Chief Constable Suzette Davenport MBE QPM
- Born: Suzette Louise Davenport; January 1963 (age 63)
- Occupation: Police officer

Suzette Louise Davenport (born January 1963) is a retired British police officer who is the former chief constable of Gloucestershire Constabulary. She was appointed in 2013, becoming the first woman to serve in the role; prior to this, she had held various other policing roles. She retired in 2017, having served thirty years as a police officer.

== Life and career ==
Suzette Louise Davenport was born in January 1963. Though Davenport is from North Yorkshire, she started her policing career with West Mercia Police. She went on to work in several police roles for different forces; by 2002, she was working for Staffordshire Police. She moved to work for the Home Office briefly in 2005; she then returned to Staffordshire Police, to the role of assistant chief constable. At one point during her career with the Staffordshire force, she held the "crime and diversity" portfolio. In 2007, Davenport moved to West Midlands Police, where she was responsible for "intelligence and neighbourhood policing".

In 2011, while Davenport was deputy chief constable with Northamptonshire Police, the Independent Police Complaints Commission launched an enquiry into the conduct of four Staffordshire officers in 2002, including Davenport, in connection with the murder of amateur footballer, Kevin Nunes. Five people were convicted of the murder of Nunes in 2008; the convicted individuals lodged an appeal with the Court of Appeal, and their convictions were quashed in 2012. The IPCC cleared the officers, including Davenport, of misconduct in 2016; Davenport said she was "pleased and relieved" that the case into her had concluded.

Prior to 2013, Davenport was the vice-president of the British Association for Women in Policing for eight years. In addition, she was appointed as the national lead for roads policing for the Association of Chief Police Officers in 2011, a role she held until retirement.

In 2013, she became the first female chief constable of Gloucestershire Constabulary. As of 2016, Davenport sat on the board of the College of Policing. While in the role, it was reported that she had ordered officers in her force to trim or cover beards, along with a ban on visible tattoos and inappropriate makeup, with the BBC's Newsbeat reporting that beard nets would be permitted as an alternative. Davenport retired in 2017, after thirty years as a police officer.

== Honours and recognition ==

Ribbon	Description	Notes
	Order of the British Empire (MBE)	2024
	Queen's Police Medal (QPM)	2016
	Queen Elizabeth II Golden Jubilee Medal	
	Queen Elizabeth II Diamond Jubilee Medal	
	Police Long Service and Good Conduct Medal	

Davenport was ranked at number 79 in The Independent on Sunday's 2014 Rainbow List of influential LGBT people, having come out as a lesbian at Pride in Gloucestershire earlier in that year. She was awarded the Queen's Police Medal in 2016, as well as an honorary doctorate by the University of Gloucestershire.

Davenport was appointed Member of the Order of the British Empire (MBE) in the 2024 New Year Honours for services to road safety as chair of the National Driver Offending Retraining Scheme.
