= Gloucestershire Police and Crime Commissioner =

- Incumbent; Chris Nelson since 13 May 2021
- Police and crime commissioner of Gloucestershire Police
- Reports to: Gloucestershire Police and Crime Panel
- Appointer: Electorate of Gloucestershire
- Term length: Four years
- Constituting instrument: Police Reform and Social Responsibility Act 2011
- Precursor: Gloucestershire Police Authority
- Inaugural holder: Martin Surl
- Formation: 22 November 2012
- Deputy: Deputy Police and Crime Commissioner
- Salary: £68,200
- Website: www.gloucestershire-pcc.gov.uk

The Gloucestershire Police and Crime Commissioner is the police and crime commissioner, an elected official tasked with setting out the way crime is tackled by Gloucestershire Police in the English County of Gloucestershire. The post was created in November 2012, following an election held on 15 November 2012, and replaced the Gloucestershire Police Authority. The current incumbent is Conservative Chris Nelson.

== List of Gloucestershire Police and Crime Commissioners ==
Name	Political party	Dates in office
Martin Surl	Independent	22 November 2012 to 12 May 2021
Chris Nelson	Conservative	13 May 2021 to present
