= Rod Hansen =

British police officer (born 1966)

Rod Hansen QPM
- Born: March 1966 (age 59–60)
- Occupation: police officer
- Years active: 1988–2025
- Known for: suspended due to allegation of gross misconduct
- Awards: Queen's Police Medal

Rodney Maibam Hansen QPM (born March 1966) is a British police officer.

== Early career ==
Hansen was educated in England, Canada and Ireland, and holds a degree in Geography and Geology. Before joining the police, he served with A Squadron (V) of the Special Air Service (SAS).

== Police career ==
He began his career at Avon and Somerset Police in Chipping Sodbury in 1988, later becoming a patrol inspector in Bristol and District Commander for Bath and North East Somerset. Hansen rose to the position of Assistant Chief Constable, before moving to Gloucestershire Constabulary in May 2013 to take up the position of Deputy Chief Constable. He was promoted to Acting Chief Constable in May 2017, before being appointed to the role full time in December of that year.

Hansen was the National Police Chiefs' Council lead for police aviation, mounted policing, and police dogs.

Since 1998, Hansen has also worked in hostage negotiation, serving as the South West Regional Co-ordinator for Negotiating. He trained negotiators from the Greek police services in 2003, in the lead-up to the 2004 Athens Olympics.

Hansen served as Chief Police Advisor to the military's Joint Task Force Headquarters, working with the Department for International Development, the Foreign and Commonwealth Office and the International Committee of the Red Cross, among others. In this role, he worked alongside the African Union Mission to Somalia as well as with Kenyan and Ugandan forces on programmes of flood relief, food assistance, and malaria reduction. He was also involved in the extraction of British nationals from Libya during the fall of the Gadaffi regime, and provided international police support to Operation RUMAN in the wake of Hurricanes Maria and Irma.

=== Suspension ===
On 7 October 2024, Hansen was suspended due to an IOPC investigation into an allegation of gross misconduct, relating to his handling of an allegation against a member of the force. At the same time, Gary Thompson, Chief of Staff at Gloucestershire Constabulary, was also suspended pending an investigation into alleged gross misconduct. Following suspension, Hansen was temporarily redeployed to a role within National Police Chiefs' Council relating to police reform. On 20 May 2025, Hansen was removed from his temporary role, having been served a second gross misconduct notice following new allegations relating to Hansen's involvement in a recruitment campaign.

== Recognition ==
Hansen was awarded the Queen's Police Medal (QPM) in the 2020 Birthday Honours.

Ribbon	Description	Notes
	Queen's Police Medal (QPM)	2020
	Queen Elizabeth II Golden Jubilee Medal	
	Queen Elizabeth II Diamond Jubilee Medal	
	Police Long Service and Good Conduct Medal	
