= Police support volunteer =

Volunteering role within British Police Forces

Police Support Volunteer (or PSV, Police Community Volunteer, PCV) is a voluntary role within the ranks of British Police Forces that involves civilian and mainly office based duties. PSV schemes became popular after 2000 when forces were expanding and needed to be more connected to the community. At the start few forces had a civilian volunteer scheme but by 2010, 32 of the 43 police forces had PSV schemes. The first PSV scheme was started in 1992 by Kent Police.

South Wales Police run a similar scheme alongside PSV, called Police Student Volunteer, a scheme that encourages students to help local policing teams.

== Duties ==
PSV's generally take on office based roles such as administration assistants or operations assistants, with tasks including paperwork, computer-based work, CCTV operators, Police Information Point assistant or frontdesk duties. However, if a PSV has specific skills that can be applied to an alternative role they could find themselves redesignated to a role that benefits from their talents such as roadside camera operations, photographic sections, force counsellor or force chaplain.

== Recruitment ==
23 of the 32 participating forces have a dedicated paid PSV manager or co-ordinator that manages and recruits volunteer on request from the requiring department. The recruitment process for PSV's involves an application form and an informal interview where the candidate will usually meet their supervisor. New recruits have no formal training, they have inductions that are specific to their role, and they have no formal uniform, although they are unofficially expected to dress respectfully. Due to the sensitive nature of a PSV's placement they are required to sign the Official Secrets Act and the Data Protection Act, and are expected to behave honourably whilst on and off duty.

== Benefits ==
The benefits of being a volunteer can include a chance to help out in the local community, benefit the police service the PSV is volunteering for, to gain work experience, particularly in a police environment and to gain an insight into the police service the PSV is volunteering for. Although being a PSV has no official direct advantage in regards to career progression, it shows dedication and experience with the police service.

== Disambiguation ==
PSVs are not Special Constables, who are also volunteers, the difference is 'specials' are frontline police and have the powers of arrest which PSVs do not have. PSVs are not civilian employees of police forces who do similar work, the difference is the latter are paid.

== Similar programmes ==
- United States has a similar programme called Volunteers in Police Service, that allows volunteers to help out local law enforcement agencies. The scheme comes under the Citizen Corps programme of President Barack Obama, which comes under the USA Freedom Corps initiative of President George W. Bush. This program focuses on co-ordinating volunteers to create safe and strong that are ready to deal with large scale emergencies and terrorism.
- Australia has some police forces, particularly New South Wales Police, with programmes called Volunteers in Policing. The program is very similar to the British counterpart except volunteers wear a uniform of blue shirt and black trousers.
