= Chris Nelson (British politician) =

British Conservative Party politician

Colonel Chris Nelson

Gloucestershire Police and Crime Commissioner
- Incumbent
- Assumed office 10 May 2021
- Preceded by: Martin Surl

Personal details
- Party: Conservative

Chris Nelson is a British Conservative Party politician who has served as the Gloucestershire Police and Crime Commissioner since being elected on 10 May 2021.

Nelson joined the British Army at the age of 18, and was educated at Royal Military Academy Sandhurst. He was active in First Gulf War and in Northern Ireland, and retired with the rank of colonel.

In the 2024 England and Wales police and crime commissioner elections, Nelson narrowly won re-election against Liberal Democrat candidate Martin Surl.
