= O'Brien (TV series) =

- Genre: Talk show
- Presented by: James O'Brien
- Country of origin: United Kingdom
- Original language: English
- No. of series: 1
- No. of episodes: 10

Production
- Running time: 60 minutes (inc. adverts)

Original release
- Network: ITV
- Release: 30 March – 10 April 2015

O'Brien is a British television talk show presented by James O'Brien. It was broadcast on ITV from 30 March 2015 to 10 April 2015.

== Episodes ==
#	Panelists	Airdate
1	Jim Davidson, Stacey Dooley, Heydon Prowse, Jolyon Rubinstein & Ava Vidal	30 March 2015
2	Edwina Currie, Andrew Pierce, Kevin Maguire, Emma Kenny & Deirdre Kelly	31 March 2015
3	Janet Street-Porter, Christine Hamilton, Dawn Harper, Norman Lamb, Vick Hope, Nikki Grahame & Lateysha Grace	1 April 2015
4	Jim Davidson, Dee Kelly, Keri Nixon, Stinson Hunter & Charlie Webster	2 April 2015
5	Sally Hudson, Graham Stanier, Rosie Welby, Alex Reid, Annabel Knight, Ashley Cain & Anna Williamson	3 April 2015
6	Jim Davidson, Sue McPherson & Anna Williamson	6 April 2015
7	Jim Davidson, Christine Hamilton, Mike Sylvain, Shazia Awan, Nadine Dorries, Matt Forde, Arun Ghosh & Owen Jones	7 April 2015
8	Jim Davidson & Ava Vidal	8 April 2015
9	Anna Williamson & Dee Kelly	9 April 2015
10	Eamonn Holmes, Michelle Mone, Ranvir Singh & Shazia Mirza	10 April 2015

== Reception ==
The majority has been negative with Gerard O'Donovan of The Daily Telegraph describing the show as "low rent" and "disappointing".
