= Sonia Deol =

British broadcaster

- Born: Birmingham, England, United Kingdom
- Occupations: Radio presenter, Television presenter for CHAN-DT
- Employer(s): Sunrise Radio (1994–2000); BBC (2000–2012); Canadian Broadcasting Corporation (2012–2015); Shaw Media (2015–2016); Corus Entertainment (2016–present)

Sonia Deol is an English radio and television presenter of Indian descent.

== Background ==
Deol's media career began before she left school, when at the age of 14 she presented a one‑off programme to raise money for Comic Relief on the BBC Local Radio station, BBC Radio WM. She graduated from the University of Hertfordshire in 1994 with a BA (Honours) in Humanities.

== Career ==
=== Early career ===
In 1994, after university Deol joined Sunrise Radio.

In 2000, she was a presenter and newsreader for BBC London. Afterwards she went on Asian network Radio XL presenting their mid-morning show, the first ever phone‑in show dedicated to the Asian Community in the Midlands.

=== BBC Asian Network: Sonia Deol Show (October 2002 – April 2006) ===
In 2002, Deol returned to the BBC Asian Network, when it was relaunched from a regional Midlands based radio station, to a national, Digital Audio Broadcasting (DAB) station, presenting the Sonia Deol Show. The show was broadcast live on weekdays from 9.00am to 12.00 noon featuring a phone-in and discussion on news, current affairs and matters generally interspersed with music notably Bhangra. On 26 September 2003 she interviewed Indian film director Kaizad Gustad about his 2003 Bollywood film, Boom.

On 6 October 2003, she was the co-host, with then Director-General of the BBC, Greg Dyke, of the BBC local radio's Frank Gillard Awards ceremony held at the National Museum of Photography, Film and Television (now renamed the National Media Museum) in Bradford. In an interview with The Independent newspaper in May 2006, Deol would state that co-hosting the awards with Dyke was one of the proudest achievements in her working life. Her show won a bronze award in the Interactive Category of the 2003 Sony Radio Academy Awards.

In May 2005 she presented her show live from a temporary "mini radio station" at the St Paul's Way Community School in Tower Hamlets, London as part of a series of broadcasts from the school to celebrate the first visit to Britain of the Bangladesh national cricket team. On 2 September she presented her show live from Paris, France, one year on from the ban on wearing headscarves and religious symbols in French public schools, often known as the French headscarf ban, looking at the impact the ban had on the Asian community in France and whether the wearing of religious symbols should be banned in British schools.

=== BBC Asian Network: Sonia Deol on the BBC Asian Network Show (April 2006 – February 2008) ===
In January 2006, the BBC announced major programme changes for the revamp of the Asian Network which took place the following April. Deol was moved from the mid-morning slot to the breakfast slot, and from 24 April she was the presenter of Sonia Deol on the BBC Asian Network which was moved back to the 6 am to 9 am weekday slot replacing the Breakfast Show, with Anita Rani taking over the mid-morning slot, having previously filled in on the programme. Deol's new show focused on news, music and entertainment and did not have a regular phone-in.

On the BBC Asian Network her mission has been to broaden the appeal of the network and encourage listeners from backgrounds other than South Asian while maintaining a service to the core audience. On her programme she has talked to all the main British political party leaders and many other leading figures from politics, media, films, music and other areas from around the world.

On 18 November, she was nominated in the Best UK Asian Radio Show category in the annual UK Asian Music Awards which was held at the Hammersmith Palais in London on 6 December. She won the Asian Achievers Media Award for 2006.

On 24 November 2006, she conducted an exclusive interview for her show, which was later repeated on BBC Radio 4's Today Programme, with long term prisoner in Pakistan, Mirza Tahir Hussain, from Leeds, who had been released from prison after his death sentence had been commuted to life imprisonment by Pakistan President Pervez Musharraf after many years in which Hussain had been found innocent twice and found guilty by different courts and sentenced to death by hanging numerous times. Deol spoke with him on his return to the UK. Deol hosted a special Asian Network Report - Big Brother special debate, broadcast live from the University of East London following on from the Celebrity Big Brother racism controversy. As part of the 2007 Diwali celebrations on 9 November, Deol presented a Diwali special on her morning show, which included her talking with British R&B singer, Jay Sean in the studio about his Diwali plans. These included a visit to a KFC and taking a train from Clapham Junction to Victoria, and then back again to Clapham Junction, while talking for the entire time on a mobile telephone.

=== Other work (February 2008 – April 2009) ===
She was a roving reporter on The Heaven and Earth Show on BBC One interviewing the likes of Olivia Newton-John former Labour Member of Parliament, Clare Short. In September 2007 she began as working as a co-presenter on its successor The Big Questions, a Sunday morning debate show, presented by Nicky Campbell, also on BBC One. She then appeared as an occasional presenter on BBC Breakfast at the weekend. She has also presented the West Midlands regional opt-out for The Politics Show each Sunday on BBC One.

=== Return to Asian Network (June 2008 – March 2012) ===
Deol returned to the Asian Network January 2010 when she became the presenter of the 10 am to 12:30 pm 'morning' show.

On Sunday 24 January 2010, Deol presented the BBC 1 documentary, 1984: A Sikh Story where she embarked on a personal journey to unravel the events of 1984, an iconic year for the Sikhs.

In March 2012, Deol broadcast her final show on the BBC Asian Network to pursue a personal life in Canada.

=== Global BC (November 2015 – March 2022) ===
On 26 November 2015 it was announced that Deol had joined CHAN-DT (Global BC) as a co-presenter of the station's regional morning news program, alongside Steve Darling. Previously, she worked occasionally for the CBC in Vancouver as a TV host. She now works at Global BC as weekend news anchor and reporter.
