= Nicky Campbell =

British media personality (born 1961)

Nicky Campbell OBE
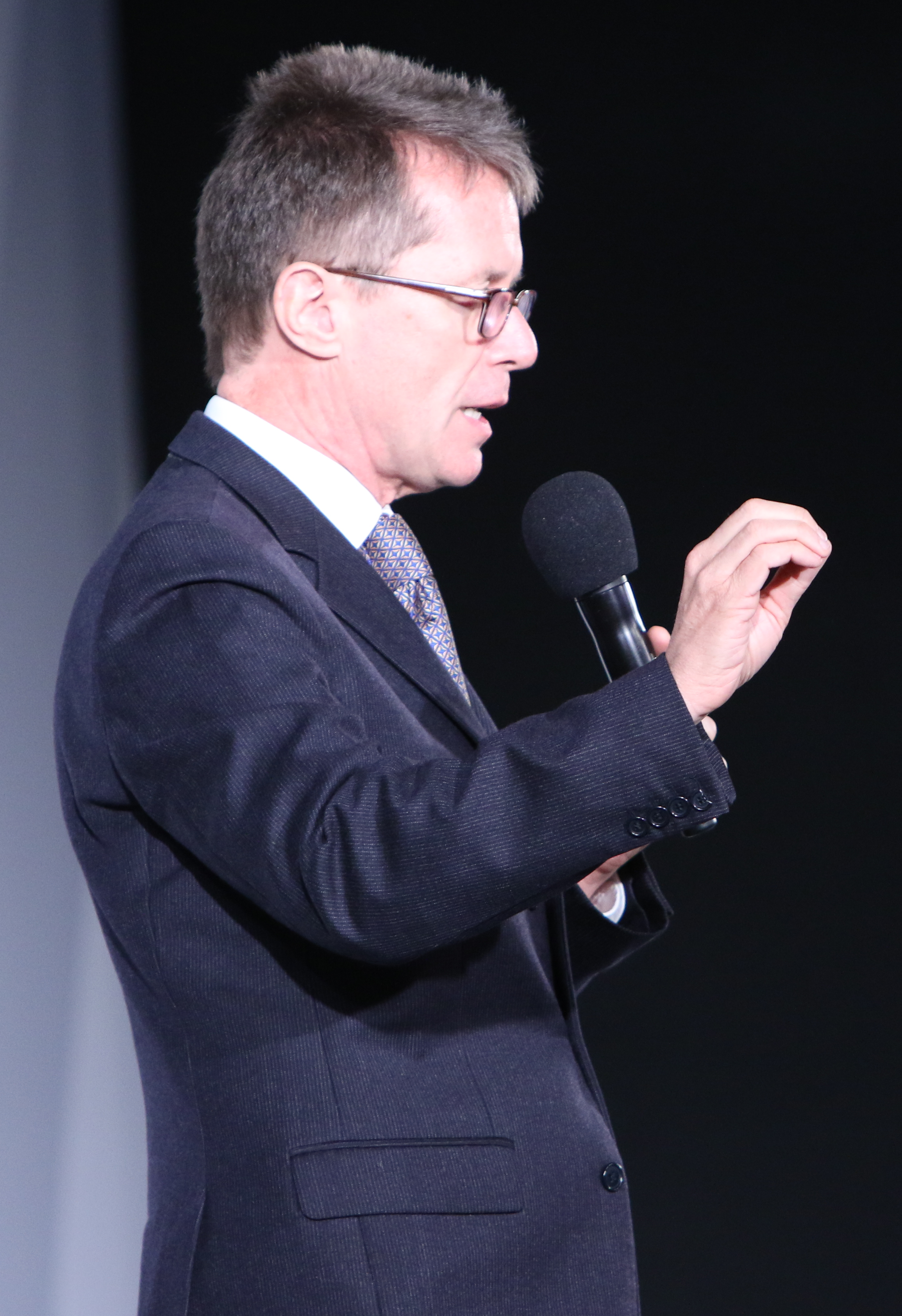
- Campbell speaking at the Illegal Wildlife Trade Conference in London in 2018
- Born: Nicholas Lackey; 10 April 1961 (age 65); Edinburgh, Scotland
- Education: Edinburgh Academy; University of Aberdeen
- Television: Wheel of Fortune; Top of the Pops; Watchdog; For the Rest of Your Life; The Big Questions; Long Lost Family
- Spouse(s): Linda Larnach (m. 1988; div. 1995) Tina Ritchie (m. 1997)
- Children: 4

Nicholas Andrew Argyll Campbell OBE (born Nicholas Lackey; 10 April 1961) is a Scottish broadcaster and journalist. He has worked in television and radio since 1981 and as a network presenter with BBC Radio since 1987.

== Early life ==
Campbell was born in Portobello, Edinburgh, on 10 April 1961, and was taken for adoption at just a few days old. His biological parents were both Irish. His unmarried mother, Stella Lackey, originally from Longford, was an Irish Protestant matron at a Dublin hospital. She was single when Campbell was conceived during a secretive affair. She travelled from Ireland to Edinburgh, where she gave birth to her son. His biological father, Eugene Hughes, was a Catholic policeman, 14 years Stella's junior, and was an Irish Republican from Belfast. Eighteen months before Nicky was born, Stella gave birth to his half-sister, Esther, also taken for adoption.

His adoptive mother, Sheila, was a psychiatric social worker, and his adoptive father, Frank, a publisher of maps.

Campbell grew up in Newington, Edinburgh, and was educated at the Edinburgh Academy, an independent school. In July 2022 he disclosed that he witnessed and experienced sexual and violent physical abuse there, which had a "profound effect on [his] life". He studied history at the University of Aberdeen and graduated with a 2:1 degree.

== Career ==
=== Radio ===
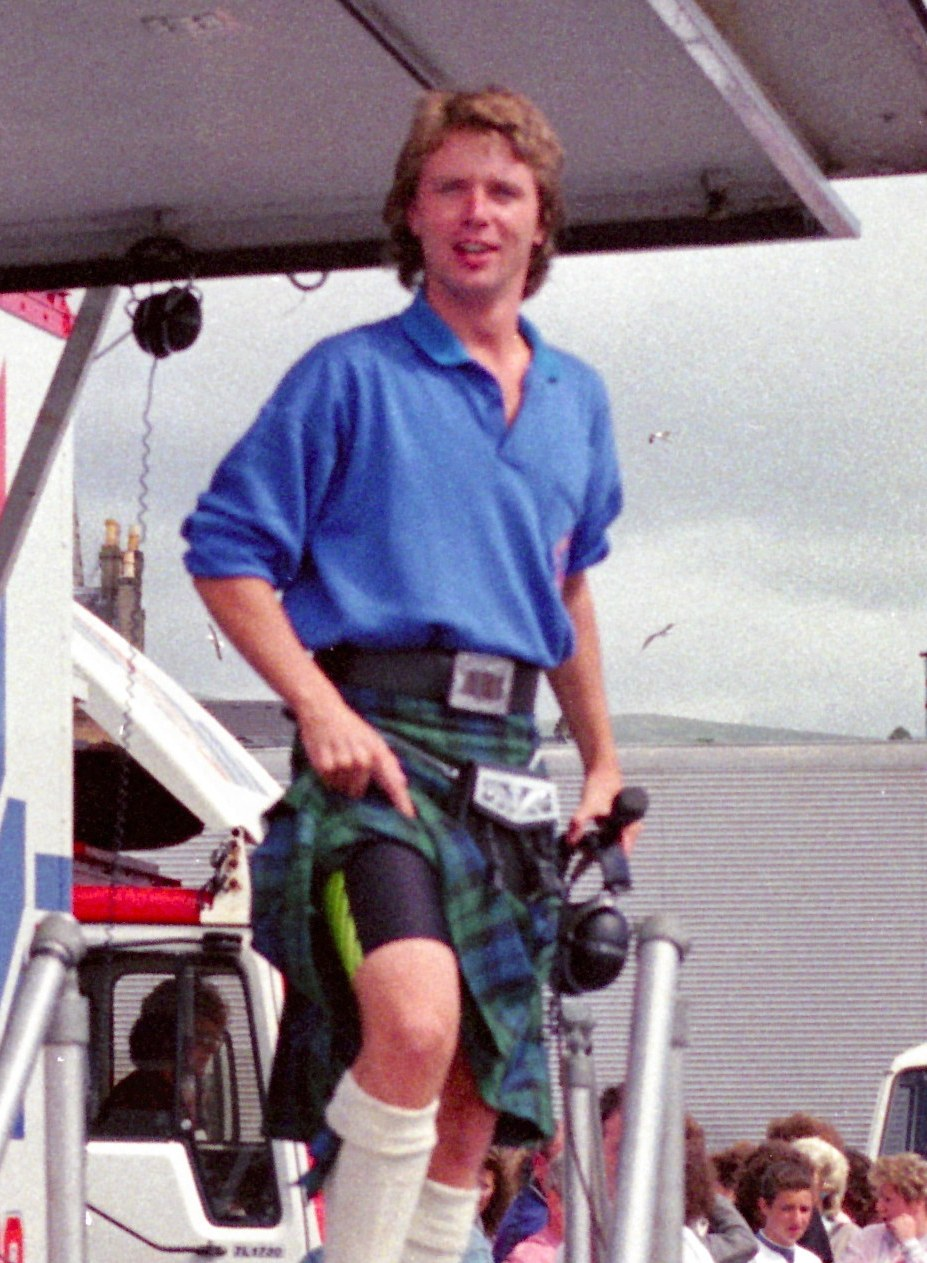
Campbell presenting the Radio 1 Roadshow from Helensburgh in July 1989

In his 2021 memoir, One of the Family, Campbell describes his lifelong obsession with radio and how he and his best friend at the time, the actor Iain Glen, would call various Radio Forth phone-in shows pretending to be different characters.

He started working for Northsound Radio in Aberdeen while still at university there, making commercials and writing jingles. In 1983 he was offered his own show, The World of Opera, which aired every Sunday night at 9 pm. On one occasion the DJ presenting the late-night pop show after him did not turn up and Campbell had to provide cover. Shortly after this he was offered the station's breakfast show, which he presented until 1986, when he sent a tape to Capital Radio in London and was given the Saturday afternoon show. He then took over the weekend breakfast show from Roger Scott and was used as a daytime "dep" for all the main daytime programmes.

The Capital Radio roster at the time included Roger Scott, Kenny Everett, Alan Freeman, Chris Tarrant and David "Kid" Jensen. It was while standing in for Tarrant and also Jensen that the head of music at BBC Radio 1, Doreen Davis, poached him from Capital, and he joined the network in October 1987.

He first presented the late-night Saturday programme but was soon moved to the weekend early show. Towards the end of 1988 he was offered the weekday late night slot which was named Into the Night. He played a wide variety of music and hosted an eclectic selection of guests for long interviews. These included Frank Zappa, David Icke, John Major, the Bee Gees and the Reverend Ian Paisley. He was also regularly joined by Frankie Howerd in the last years of the comedian's life. In August 1993, Campbell also briefly took over a Sunday morning show, following the on-air resignation of Dave Lee Travis.

Campbell left the network briefly in October 1993 to care for his sick wife. He then returned in January 1994 to present the weekday Drivetime show, and in 1995, he took over the afternoon show.

In 1997 he joined the news and sport network BBC Radio 5 Live, when offered the job by Roger Mosey, the station's head. He presented the mid-morning phone in show for five years before replacing Julian Worricker in the breakfast slot in January 2003, co-presenting initially with Victoria Derbyshire. In 2001, when Radio 2 wanted a replacement for Jimmy Young, he said that he was the BBC's choice and detailed a series of meetings between himself and the controller of Radio 2. However, the BBC later said that Campbell had initiated the meetings himself, and his public revelations about private negotiations was criticised by Director General Greg Dyke. From 2004 to 2011, he co-presented the programme with Shelagh Fogarty. In May 2011, Fogarty left the breakfast show and was replaced by Rachel Burden. Campbell started presenting a one hour at 9am phone-in Your Call after the main show. Burden and Campbell presented together until 2021, when Campbell moved to a two-hour phone-in programme from 9am to 11am every weekday morning.

Between April and October 2023 his show was broadcast on the BBC News Channel, the iPlayer and BBC Two.

His radio career also includes work for Radio 2. In January 2019 Campbell presented Engelbert; 60 years of song, a musical retrospective and in-depth interview with Engelbert Humperdink. Following the success of that programme he interviewed Francis Rossi of Status Quo for another Radio 2 special – Here we Are and Here We Go which was broadcast in May 2019. In August of that year, as part of the Radio 2 Beatles pop-up station he presented an hour-long interview live from Abbey Road studios with Giles Martin – A Day in the Life – Nicky Campbell meets Giles Martin.

In his time at Radio 5 Live, Campbell has covered four Olympic Games, three Football World Cups and three European Championships and every general election and referendum since 1997. In 1999 he was voted Variety Club Radio Personality of the year. He has won several Sony Awards, including five gold, and in 2017 he and Rachel Burden won the Aria Award for "Best Speech Presenter Breakfast".

In 2014 Campbell was inducted into the Arqiva Radio Academy Hall of Fame, which recognises the "immense contribution that celebrated broadcasters and presenters have made to UK audio and radio over many years."

In 2024 he presented a 5 part series for BBC Radio 3. In the programme Nicky Campbell and his guest share and explored how classical music has soundtracked their worlds as parents, children and caregivers.

In 2024 Campbell wrote and presented a three part series on BBC Radio 4 - How Boarding Schools shaped Britain. the influence and lasting impact of Boarding Schools on Britain - the British ruling class and class system in particular. The series was produced by Louise Cooper.

=== Television ===
In 1986, he had a short stint on Music Box, the pan-European 24-hour cable and satellite television channel while he was with Capital Radio.

Campbell's first mainstream television was shortly after he joined Radio 1 in 1987 when he hosted a pop quiz on Grampian Television, The Video Jukebox. The team captains were Gaz Top and Jaki Graham.

In 1989, he presented the channel Travelling Talk Show from Volgograd in the Soviet Union. The audience discussion programme addressed the implications of reform under Mikhail Gorbachev and the effects of Glasnost and Perestroika on ordinary Soviet citizens. The Travelling Talk Show also went to Bogotá to hear from ordinary Colombians about Pablo Escobar, the Medellín and Cali cartels, and the country's narcotics wars.

From 1988 to 1997, Campbell was on the roster of regular presenters of Top of the Pops on BBC1.

In 1990, he worked again for Grampian Television, making You'd Better Believe It, a trivia quiz.

When the British rights to the Wheel of Fortune were secured by Scottish Television, Campbell got the presenting job after piloting against Eamonn Holmes, and he hosted the show from 1988 to 1996. His co-presenters were first Angela Ekaette, then Carol Smillie, and for his final season, Jenny Powell. The programme, made prior to satellite broadcasting, aired on ITV reaching audiences of up to 12 million.

In 1992, he anchored Goal on Sky TV. This was a World Cup-based football quiz featuring teams comprising Geoff Hurst, Martin O'Neill and Terry Yorath and in which Campbell posed questions on footage from previous tournaments.

In 1993, he studio-anchored the Big Race, an ITV adventure show in which a team led by the former Blue Peter presenter Peter Duncan drove overland across Europe to Russia, ending up in Siberia and finally crossing the Bering Strait through Alaska and then on to New York months after starting out.

Also in 1993, Campbell hosted Strictly Classified for Granada Television. This was a studio-based magazine show centred around quirky stories from the classified ads in local newspapers. His co-hosts were Pauline Daniels and Jeff Green.

In 1995, he made the Nicky Campbell Show, a short-lived chat and entertainment programme for BBC Scotland, and in 1996, was a presenter/reporter on Ride On, the Channel 4 motoring magazine.

He made a film for the BBC Two documentary series Leviathan in 1998 entitled Braveheart, in which he looked at Edward I of England and William Wallace and explored the historical roots of Scottish antipathy, real or imagined, towards the English.

In 1999, he was one of the presenters of the Rugby World Cup for ITV.

Between 1990 and 2001, he presented Central Weekend (also called Central Weekend Live), a late-night debate show on Friday night in the Central Television region. Campbell was the main presenter and co-presenters included Anna Soubry, Adrian Mills, Sue Jay, Claudia Winkleman, Kaye Adams, John Stapleton, Roger Cook, Paul Ross and Sheila Ferguson. During one debate, Campbell was attacked live on camera by an irate participant in a debate on women's football. Campbell had reprimanded him for using a misogynistic term, threatening him with the "red card". The assailant, Robert Davey, was subsequently charged and given a 12-month prison sentence.

London's ITV franchise Carlton Television and also network ITV made versions of the programme, Carlton Live and Thursday Night Live, which were shown between 1996 and 2002. These were also hosted by Campbell. He presented one series with Richard Littlejohn and then all subsequent ones with Andrew Neil.

In 2001, he took over as presenter/reporter on Watchdog, the long-running consumer affairs show. He remained there until 2009 when he and Julia Bradbury were replaced by Anne Robinson. Before Bradbury his co-host was Kate Gerbeau.

In 2001, days after the September 11 attacks, Campbell went to New York to host a discussion on the aftermath for Panorama, and that year, he also presented some episodes of Newsnight.

In 2002, he anchored Your NHS from London's Chelsea and Westminster Hospital, when the BBC devoted much of the day to a look at the NHS, culminating with Campbell's interview with Prime Minister Tony Blair.

In 2003, Campbell fronted David Blaine: The Event as Blaine began an endurance stunt inside a transparent Plexiglas box suspended on the south bank of the River Thames.

In 2004, he launched Now You're Talking, the replacement to the morning Kilroy studio discussion show after the BBC sacked Robert Kilroy-Silk.

In 2005, he presented The Last Word, a late-night topical debate show from Glasgow.

In 2006, Campbell appeared in the singing show Just the Two of Us, with Beverley Knight.

In 2007, Campbell returned to the game show world for The Rest of Your Life on ITV, a show devised by Dick de Rijk who also created Deal or No Deal. It first aired on ITV in May 2007. In each game, a couple tried to win a prize of a series of monthly cheques whose length and value were determined by random choices of which squares on the studio floor to light up.

Campbell featured in an episode of Who Do You Think You Are? that aired 11 July 2007, where he was seen tracing his adoptive family's roots in Scotland and Australia. The research also uncovered his father's involvement in the Battle of Kohima in 1944.

Campbell hosted The Big Questions, an ethical and religious debate show which ran on BBC One on Sunday morning for 14 series between 2007 and 2021. This amounted to almost 900 studio debates.

In 2009, he presented the second series of the BBC Two quiz show Battle of the Brains.

In 2011 Long Lost Family came to British television, a show which he has presented with Davina McCall through 14 series. In The Times, Carole Midgley wrote of the show; "Nicky Campbell and Davina McCall have the knack of squeezing out enough emotion to make it a full box of Kleenex show, but stopping short of it being too schmaltzy. Stories this gobsmacking need no ramping up." The programme has launched over 700 searches for missing relatives. It remains one of ITV's highest rating factual shows. Campbell and McCall also present Long Lost Family – What Happened Next and Long Lost Family – Born without Trace which helps foundlings abandoned as babies. The team, led by Ariel Bruce, solve the mystery of their beginnings through DNA testing and detective work. In 2013, Long Lost Family won the Royal Television Society Award for best popular factual programme and in 2014, the BAFTA Award for best feature. In 2021, the programme won best Lifestyle Show in the TV Choice Awards. The same year, Born Without Trace won the BAFTA for best feature, and in the same year, the programme won a Golden Rose for best Factual and Entertainment show at the Rose d'Or International Awards.

Lost Family and its spin-off series Born Without Trace again won at the 2025 TV Choice Awards in the Best Lifestyle Show category.

In 2025 Long Lost Family again was a winner at the Link TV Choice awards, voted from by readers.

The two-part special for ITV, Long Lost Family Special - The Mother and Baby Home Scandal, won the Radio Times Readers’ Award at the prestigious Sandford St Martin Awards 2026.

In 2013, Campbell returned to BBC1 consumer journalism co-hosting Your Money Their Tricks with Rebecca Wilcox and Sian Williams.

In 2014, Campbell made the documentary series Wanted: A Family of My Own for ITV. The programme's sought to dispel the myths and misconceptions surrounding what is often seen as the "complicated" process of adoption, and was granted unprecedented access to the workings of eight local authorities, as well as the lives of parents and children at various stages of the adoption process.

In 2017, he made a documentary for the Women at War series for BBC One with his adoptive mother Sheila Campbell. He found out more about his her role in World War II and her experiences as a radar operator on D-Day. Also that year, he took part in All Star Musicals for ITV, performing Razzle Dazzle from the musical Chicago Live! at the London Palladium.

In 2019 and 2020, he presented both series of the BAFTA-nominated Operation Live for Channel 5. This followed life-changing surgery live, in real time, including a brain operation, a total knee replacement and open heart surgery.

In 2021, Campbell presented Manhunt: The Raoul Moat Story on ITV1. This was the inside story of how Moat was tracked down, all in the glare of 24-hour rolling news. In June 2023, Campbell's documentary made by Summer Film, Secrets of the Bay City Rollers, was released on ITV, STV and ITVX. The Guardian described the film as "one of the most disturbing accounts of abuse imaginable…a sensitively told tale of horrific cruelty". The Times said it was "brave" and "shocking" and "moving". The Telegraph review described the documentary as "horribly fascinating…..a story of unimaginable horror".

In November 2023, Campbell presented the State Opening of Parliament for the BBC from the Palace of Westminster. Also in the same month he appeared in the BBC Panorama documentary "My Teacher the Abuser: Fighting for Justice", recounting the abuse he suffered at the hands of Edinburgh Academy teacher Iain Wares, who has been accused of abusing dozens of boys during the 1960s and 1970s.

In February 2024, Campbell participated in the fifth series of The Masked Singer UK as the character "Dippy Egg". He was eliminated and unmasked in the sixth episode.

=== Voiceover work ===
Campbell narrates the CBeebies show Our Story.

In 2013 he provided the voiceover for the controversial Mentorn documentary When Tommy met Mo. The documentary spent 18 months filming Tommy Robinson, whose real name is Stephen Yaxley-Lennon, the English far-right leader, and Mo Ansar, the social commentator, educationalist, Imam and spokesperson for British Muslims who had tried to get the English Defence League banned.

From 2020 Campbell narrated the first three series of Motorway Cops: Catching Britain's Speeders on Channel 5, and he also narrated the second and third series of Rogue Landlords, Nightmare Tenants for the network.

=== Podcasts ===
Campbell's podcast One of Family won the Dog Desk Radio award in 2021 for Best Animal Related Podcast and frequently reached the number 1 spot in the Apple Podcasts Pets and Animal charts for Great Britain. Guests have included Ricky Gervais, Gary Lineker, Robbie Savage, Jeremy Paxman, Lorraine Kelly, Chris Packham, Sara Cox, Kevin Bridges and Deborah Meaden.

In June 2022 the BBC launched his podcast Different for Radio 5 Live on BBC Sounds, in which he interviews people who have had unusual experiences, beliefs or careers. His guests have included David MacMillan, the only Westerner to escape Bangkok's infamous Klong Prem Prison, a Scottish witch, journalist Paul Salopek who has been walking the route of human evolution for a decade and broadcaster Iain Lee on his experiences with ADHD – an episode also featuring Campbell's daughter Kirsty, who has ADHD.

In July 2022 Campbell interviewed journalist Alex Renton on Different, and Campbell revealed he had witnessed and experienced abuse at his school The Edinburgh Academy. Campbell wrote an article for the Daily Mirror on the same day as the podcast's release. The revelations increased pressure on the Scottish prosecution services to extradite one of the alleged abusers from South Africa, referred to as Edgar in the podcast and press because of a ruling on anonymity by the ongoing Scottish Child Abuse Inquiry. "Edgar" features heavily including Day 261 of the inquiry, in which he is referred to as "CDZ". After the podcast was released dozens more men came forward and the police opened an investigation solely relating to the Edinburgh Academy, Operation Tree Frog. Renton reported that because of the publicity ex-pupils of Edinburgh Academy had named 17 other staff members, employed between the 1950s and 1980s, as physical and sexual abusers.

In September 2022 Campbell and Renton were asked to appear on the South African current affairs programme Carte Blanche to talk about "Edgar", who was living in a comfortable retirement village near Cape Town. His appeal against extradition is ongoing. In January 2023 the SNP MP Ian Blackford used Parliamentary Privilege to identify Iain Wares as "Edgar". On 7 March 2023, Lady Smith, chair of the Scottish Child Abuse Inquiry, passed down the judgement that Wares could be widely named.

Campbell appeared on James O'Brien's Full Disclosure. The two broadcasters discussed their experiences of adoption and the effect on their lives and mental health.

He appeared in Michael Fenton Stevens' podcast My Time Capsule in June 2021, on which talked about Charlie Brooker attacking him in the press and television over a number of years, including an expletive-laden monologue in 2009 which put him in bed for two days. Campbell said,

"I've suffered from terrible depression since I can remember — probably since I was a teenager, and I have bipolar disorder type 2. It sent me into a really, really low ebb and I was suffering badly at the time, anyway. Of course I can take people having a go and having a bit of craic and insulting you — it goes with the game. But this was visceral. Really, really visceral and really vicious and really horrible."

In the 2023 British Podcast Awards his podcast Different won the award for best interview podcast. The winning episode was his conversation with Jenny Pearson, the daughter of the teacher who sexually abused him at the Edinburgh Academy.

=== Music ===
Campbell is a self-taught musician and plays piano, guitar and ukulele. After composing songs for Aberdeen University Theatre for the Edinburgh Festival Fringe, he started writing music for radio jingles and commercials at Northsound Radio in 1981, while still at college.

In 1996 while at Radio 1 he won a Sony Award (silver) for his original compositions for the BBC Radio One Afternoon Show he presented at the time.

In 2009, after meeting the actor Mark Moraghan, Campbell wrote a swing album for him, Moonlight's Back in Style, which was released by Linn Records.

He also appeared on the album singing some backing vocals and the two of them performed the track "Through it All" on Children in Need.

"Through It All" was also covered by The Ukuleles on their debut album released by Demon Music.

In 2014 Campbell co-wrote the album Just Passing Through with Kate Robbins, which was released in July of that year. They both appeared on the record.

He composed the original theme music for The Big Questions, the BBC One Sunday morning debate show which ran from 2007 to 2021.

In 2017 Campbell was asked to write the song "Sacred Eyes" for the 40th anniversary of the Sheldrick Wildlife Trust and a video about the famous elephant orphanage. The music was performed by Kit Morgan and Logan Wilson with a string quartet arranged by Paul Buck.

In May 2024 he set up Nicky Campbell Music on all the streaming sites as an outlet for music he has written and co-written including all his compositions for podcasts.

Campbell is a company director of Mhor Music Ltd., an original music company producing bespoke and original music for film, television, corporate media, online content and Mhor Productions Ltd. In summer 2022 he directed and shot the video for "Dark Night" by APECCS featuring George Fenton CBE.

On 13 June 2025, Campbell released his third studio album but his first solo effort, 'Through it All – 13 songs about love'. It was released on the Wiener World label. Ten of the tracks are written by Campbell and there are three covers, two of which are duets with his daughter Kirsty Campbell Ritchie. The Times described the album as "a mixture of covers and sharply penned originals. A touching, upbeat homage to "the glorious contours" of love". UKE magazine, reviewed the record saying: "It's difficult to spot which is a self-penned song and which are covers of classics of the era, something that speaks to the authenticity of a brilliantly produced album."

=== Writing and published books ===
Campbell wrote a music column for the Scottish Sunday Mail between 1987 and 1989 and a regular sports column for the Guardian between 2006 and 2007. He has written for the Daily Mirror, the Sunday Mirror, The Spectator, the New Statesman, the Daily Mail, the Mail on Sunday, the Observer and the Press Gazette amongst many.

He has authored two books. His first 'Blue-Eyed Son – The Story of an Adoption', came out in 2004. In this he described the search for both his birth parents and meeting his birth mother Stella Lackey in 1989 and birth father Eugene Hughes in 2002. His birth mother, a nurse from a Dublin Protestant family was 36 when she had the brief affair and Eugene Hughes, a Dublin policeman from a Catholic South Armagh family, was 21. Campbell also discovered that his grandfather had been in the IRA in 1919–1921, and his biological father had been active in the IRA of the 1950s. When reports emerged prior to publication that his father was a committed Irish Republican, as his father had been before him, Stella's nephew and her elderly sister, by then very ill, were doorstepped by the English tabloid press. Stella's family had no idea who their aunt's brief and obviously secret lover in 1960 had been or anything about his religious or political background and were panicked into a denial. When the book came out Campbell wrote about his birth father's background and all was explained in chapters 13, 14, 15 and 16 of Blue-Eyed Son. Both sides of his birth families helped with and contributed to the book. His birth father's own cousin Tony Hughes had been shot by the British Army in Armagh in 1973.

In the book, given his own birth parents' experience, Campbell explored in some detail the cultural and social taboos of inter-religious relationships in the 1950s and 1960s. The Daily Mail review described Blue-Eyed Son as "an intimate, extraordinary and often tender memoir". The Scotsman said it was "astonishingly honest . . . one man's set of raw, moving and resonant truths". The Independent described it as "an extraordinary story".

His second book, One of the Family – Why a Dog Called Maxwell Changed My Life, came out in 2021. In this he addressed his complex relationship with his birth mother and the guilt he carried towards his adoptive parents for needing to trace her. He described his emotional breakdown and late diagnosis of bipolar disorder, and how his beloved Labrador Maxwell's unconditional love had helped him. Andrew Billen in The Times described it as "A remarkable autobiography".

== Campaigning for animals ==
Campbell is a vocal advocate for animals, writing and campaigning for rights, welfare and conservation. After awakening to the desperate plight of the African elephant he began campaigning with Will Travers of the Born Free Foundation and the writer and campaigner Dominic Dyer to raise awareness of the issue and campaign to ban the ivory trade. He has written extensively on the subject.

He regularly attends the Global March for Elephants and Rhinos, held in cities across the world and frequently speaks at the event.

He has also campaigned for and supported the Sheldrick Wildlife Trust in Kenya, is a patron of the Born Free Foundation and supports a number of animal and conservation charities including Animals Asia, The Born Free Foundation, and the Jane Goodall Institute.

In 2020 he won an Animal Star Ward for campaigning for animals and raising awareness.

In 2021 he presented the BBC One appeal for Hearing Dogs for Deaf People.

Campbell is also an active supporter of Guide Dogs UK. He hosted their presentation in the main arena at Crufts in 2022.

== Honours ==
On 4 December 2008, Campbell received an Honorary Doctorate from the Robert Gordon University, Aberdeen.

Campbell was appointed Officer of the Order of the British Empire (OBE) in the 2015 Birthday Honours, for his services to children and adoption.

In 2016 he was given an Honorary Doctorate from the University of Aberdeen.

== Personal life ==
Campbell met his first wife Linda Larnach, a divorcee eight years his senior with two sons, whilst working at Northsound Radio in Aberdeen. They married on 30 August 1988 at the University of Aberdeen chapel, although lived in Finchley, and took time off in the Virgin Islands.

They moved to North London where he would later nurse her through a health scare and encouraged his young stepsons in their footballing endeavours, hosting auctions to raise funds for their local amateur club. During their marriage he traced his birth mother Stella in 1989. He reportedly took time out from his career during Larnach's illness. When they subsequently separated she gave interviews in which she said his career break had been a publicity stunt.

Campbell married his second wife, the journalist Christina "Tina" Ritchie, on 13 December 1997 at St Columba's Church, London.

A former presenter of Radio 1 Newsbeat, Ritchie is now a newsreader on BBC Radio 4. The couple live in Balham and have a home in Glenelg in the Scottish Highlands. They have four daughters. Following the birth of four children of his own with Ritchie, he decided in 2002 to find his Irish biological father.

In 2004, Campbell wrote Blue-Eyed Son – Story of an Adoption, his account of being adopted and tracing both his birth parents and his extended families in Ireland, on both sides of the religious divide. His birth mother Stella died in 2008 in Dublin. Campbell was a coffin bearer and spoke at her Dublin funeral. His birth father Eugene died in 2021 in County Leitrim. As a result of his books and his work promoting adoption, he was asked to become a patron of the British Association for Adoption and Fostering (BAAF) and more recently an ambassador for Adoption UK. Campbell's adoptive father Frank died in 1996 of pancreatic cancer.

Campbell has been diagnosed with bipolar disorder; his birth mother also had the condition and has candidly discussed his depression.

In 2021 he wrote the Sunday Times Bestseller One of the Family – Why A Dog Called Maxwell Changed My Life. The book was dedicated to his adoptive mother Sheila. On 12 December 2019, Campbell announced via social media that she had died at the age of 96. The tweet was widely reported.

He wrote:

My mum Sheila died yesterday at 96. We made a BBC programme together about her service as a radar operator and she was immensely proud of her role on D-Day. Her life's work was as a social worker helping others. The day she and Dad adopted me was the day I won the lottery. She doted on her grandchildren and my girls completely adored her. Everybody did. I am so lucky and proud to have had her as my mum and will miss her more than we can ever express. She was my adoptive mum. She was my real mum.

== Filmography ==
Television

Year	Title	Role	Channel	Notes
1987	Music Box	Presenter	Central Television	
1987	The Video Jukebox	Presenter	Grampian Television	
1989	The Traveling Talk Show	Presenter	Channel 4	
1988–1991, 1994–1997	Top of the Pops	Presenter	BBC One	
1988–1994	Wheel of Fortune	Presenter	ITV	
1990	You'd Better Believe It	Presenter	Central Television	
1990–2004	Central Live	Presenter	Central Television	
1992	Goal	Pop star	Sky TV	
1993	The Big Race	Presenter	ITV	
1993	Strictly Classified	Presenter	Granada Television	
1995	The Nicky Campbell Show	Presenter	BBC Scotland	
1996	Ride On	Presenter	Channel 4	
1997	Referendum Street	Presenter	BBC One	
1998–2002	Thursday Night Live	Presenter	ITV	
1998	Leviathan	Presenter	BBC Two	
1999	The Rugby World Cup	Presenter	ITV	
1999	Newsnight	Presenter	BBC Two	
2001–2009	Watchdog	Co-presenter	BBC One	With Kate Gerbeau and Julia Bradbury
2001	Panorama	Presenter	BBC One	
2001	Newsnight	Presenter	BBC Two	
2002	Your NHS	Presenter	BBC One	
2003	David Blaine; the Event	Presenter	Sky One/ Channel 4	
2004	Now You're Talking	Presenter	BBC One	
2004	Come and Have a Go If You Think You're Smart Enough	Presenter	BBC One	
2005	The Last Word	Presenter	BBC Scotland	
2007	The Rest of Your Life	Presenter	ITV	
2007	Who Do You Think You Are?	Presenter	BBC One	
2007–2021	The Big Questions	Presenter	BBC One	
2009	The Battle of the Brains	Presenter	BBC One	
2009–present	Long Lost Family	Presenter	ITV	With Davina McCall
2013	Your Money Their Tricks	Co-presenter	BBC One	With Sian Williams and Rebecca Wilcox
2014	Wanted: A Family of My Own	Presenter	ITV	1 series
2015	Perspectives: The Great American Love Song	Presenter	ITV	Guest presenter; 1 episode
2015	Rebuild Our Home	Presenter	ITV	One-off episode
2017	Women at War	Presenter	BBC One	
2017	All Star Musicals	Participant	ITV	
2018	Born Without Trace	Presenter	BBC One	
2018	Coronation Street's DNA Secrets	Presenter	ITV	One-off Episode
2019–2020	Operation Live	Presenter	Channel 5	
2021	Manhunt: The Raul Moat Story	Presnter	ITV	
2023	Secrets of the Bay City Rollers	Presenter	ITVX	
2024	The Masked Singer UK	Participant	ITV1	Unmasked as "Dippy Egg"

Radio

Year	Network	Programme	Role	Notes
1981–85	Northsound Radio	weekdays	Presenter	
1987	BBC Radio 1	Saturdays, 10 pm	Presenter	
1988	BBC Radio 1	Weekends, 6 – 8 am	Presenter	
1988–1993	BBC Radio 1	Monday to Thursday, late-evening	Presenter	
1993	BBC Radio 1	Sundays, 10 am – 1 pm	Presenter	
1994	BBC Radio 1	Weekdays, 4 – 7 pm	Presenter	
1995	BBC Radio 1	Weekdays, 2–4 pm	Presenter	
1997–2003	BBC Radio 5 Live	Mid-morning	Presenter	
2003–2021	BBC Radio 5 Live	Breakfast show	Presenter	
2021–present	BBC Radio 5 Live	Mid-morning	Presenter	

Preceded by None	Host of Wheel of Fortune; 1988–96	Succeeded by Bradley Walsh
Academic offices
Preceded by Nicholas Parsons	Rector of the University of St Andrews; 1991–1993	Succeeded by Donald Findlay
