= Lizzie Dearden =

British journalist

- Education: NCTJ; University of York
- Occupation: Journalist
- Employer: The Independent
- Writing career
- Notable work: Plotters: The UK Terrorists Who Failed
- Website: lizziedearden.com

Lizzie Dearden is a British journalist who is currently security correspondendent for The i Paper.

Dearden previously worked at The Independent as Home Affairs and Security Correspondent between 2017 and 2021, and Home Affairs Editor until August 2023, writing on extremism, terrorism, crime, policing, and legal affairs.

== Career ==
In 2013, Dearden, who was writing for the Ilford Recorder, won the Ted Bottemley Award for her media law and practice paper, which had been described by the examiner as "a joy to mark".

At the British Journalism Awards in 2020, Dearden was "highly commended" for her crime and legal affairs journalism. Judges said she "produced a range of high-quality exclusive stories on huge matters of public interest".

In March 2021, right-wing activist James Goddard called Dearden "scum of the earth" and "vile" at Westminster Magistrates' Court where she was reporting on his trial concerning his harassment of pro-Remain (anti-Brexit) MP Anna Soubry. He was later handed an indefinite restraining order banning him from contacting her.

On 17 January 2021, at around 9.50pm, far-right English Defence League founder Tommy Robinson appeared at Dearden's home after hiring a private investigator to find her address, and threatened to falsely accuse her partner of being a paedophile after she reported in The Independent that Robinson had been accused of misusing supporters’ money. He was given a temporary stalking prevention order in a hearing at Westminster Magistrates' Court, which he did not attend, and in October 2021 was given a five-year stalking prevention order, banning him from contacting her about anything other than her news stories about him. Dearden later stated that she "considered changing [her] role because of that but [she] didn’t, [she] kept on going."

In 2023, Dearden published under C. Hurst & Co Plotters: The UK Terrorists Who Failed; a book about a series of botched terrorist attacks in the UK between 2017 and 2022, their motivations and the reasons for their failure.

Between August 2023 and August 2025, Dearden was a freelance home affairs and security journalist.

In April 2025, Dearden was employed by The New York Times UK Bureau, where she remained until April 2026.

In May 2026, Dearden became the security correspondent at The i Paper.
