= James O'Brien (broadcaster) =

British journalist (born 1972)

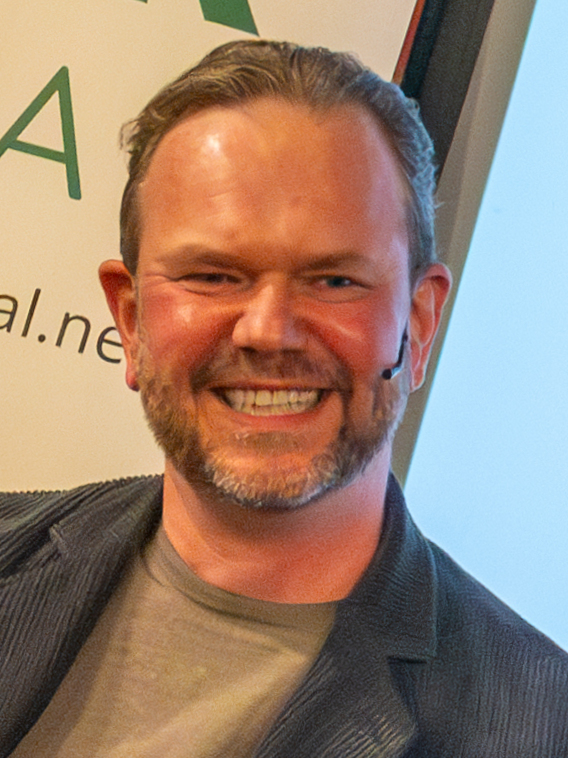
- O'Brien at the 2024 Chiswick Book Festival
- Born: January 13, 1972 (age 54); London, England
- Education: Ampleforth College
- Alma mater: London School of Economics (BSc)
- Occupations: Journalist, television and radio presenter, writer
- Known for: LBC, Newsnight
- Spouse: Lucy McDonald
- Children: 2

James O'Brien (born 13 January 1972) is a British journalist, writer, and presenter on radio and television. Since 2004, he has hosted a weekday morning phone-in discussion for talk station LBC. He has also presented podcasts, been an occasional presenter for BBC's Newsnight, and published several non-fiction books, including the bestselling How They Broke Britain in 2023.

== Early life and education ==
James O'Brien was born in 1972 to a teenage single mother whose name he knows but whom he has never tried to contact. He grew up in Kidderminster after being adopted at the age of 28 days by Jim O'Brien, a journalist on the Doncaster Evening News (who later joined The Daily Telegraph) and his wife Joan; the couple also have a daughter Charlotte. O'Brien was raised in the Roman Catholic faith and refers to himself as a Christian.

O'Brien was educated at the Catholic independent school Ampleforth College, from which he was expelled for smoking cannabis.

He later studied philosophy and economics at the London School of Economics, later saying that he was not a very attentive student, but that he had later realised and understood the importance of an education in philosophy.

== Career ==
=== Men's outfitters ===
After University, O'Brien secured an outfitters position at luxury brand Aquascutum on Regent Street. Amongst his customers were the entire Great Britain Olympic Rowing Team who participated in Atlanta in 1996. The same year, he measured Prime Minister John Major for the white suit that he was to wear during his visit to Florence for the EU summit of 1996. The suit sale prompted O'Brien to contact the Daily Express submitting a related article, which they accepted, giving him his break into journalism, a role he was not trained for. The "white suit" article led to a staff position at the Express newspaper.

=== Journalism ===
Prior to his broadcasting career, O'Brien was an editor of the Daily Express gossip column, written under the pseudonym William Hickey. He also wrote for the Daily Mail, Cosmopolitan, and The Spectator.

=== Television ===
From 2000 to 2002, O'Brien was a panellist on the Channel 5 programme The Wright Stuff. In early 2001, he presented A Knight with O'Brien, a talk show on Anglia Television.

With his wife, Lucy McDonald, he fronted Channel 5's 2001 general election talk show 5 Talk, securing a review from Clive James, who wrote: "James... is a pink-shirted walking encyclopedia of political savvy".

O'Brien began occasionally guest presenting on the BBC Two programme Newsnight in August 2014. Following the widespread interest in O'Brien's interview with Nigel Farage, it was speculated he would be a permanent replacement for longtime host Jeremy Paxman, who intended to step down. The job was ultimately taken by Evan Davis. O'Brien left Newsnight in January 2018 after being criticised for his anti-Brexit and anti-Trump views, which were felt to be out of step with the corporation's policy on neutrality. He departed on good terms, saying the BBC still had the finest selection of journalists in the world.

In 2015, O'Brien presented a chat show for ITV called O'Brien, which aired for ten episodes.

=== LBC ===
O'Brien first appeared on LBC during 2002 as a holiday cover presenter. His own weekly programme began in January 2003 and he became a full-time presenter in 2004. Regular features of his show include the "Mystery Hour", in which listeners phone in with various things that puzzle them and other callers attempt to give a solution.

O'Brien made national headlines in April 2009 when footballer Frank Lampard phoned his show to object to tabloid stories about his private life and O'Brien's discussion of them. Lampard's former fiancée, Elen Rivas, had alleged that he had turned their home into a bachelor pad, while she and Lampard's children were living in a rented flat. Lampard phoned in, objecting to the assertion that he was "weak" and "scum" and said that he had fought "tooth and nail" to keep his family together. Public comments on Lampard's reaction praised his handling of the situation. The exchange later earned O'Brien, who defended his conduct in an equally heated exchange with Kay Burley on Sky News, a Bronze Award in the Best Interview category of the 2010 Sony Radio Academy Awards.

In 2013, O'Brien clashed with Work and Pensions Secretary Iain Duncan Smith in an argument over the Work Programme. In May 2014, O'Brien interviewed UKIP leader Nigel Farage. During the interview, O'Brien picked up on Farage's comment that he felt uncomfortable on a train at not being able to hear anyone speaking English. Farage was also criticised by O'Brien for misinterpreting having English as a second language as being unable to speak English at all and for saying he would be concerned if a group of Romanian men moved in next door to him. In October 2014, O'Brien was determined by Ofcom to have breached broadcasting rules by his remarks during the Clacton by-election.

In August 2024, O'Brien apologised for praising a social media video that attributed some of the violence during the 2024 United Kingdom riots to "Zionist backers" during an LBC broadcast. He explained that he had not watched the video in full before commenting and described the remarks as "obnoxious and anti-Semitic".

In July 2025, O'Brien apologised after airing a listener's message that falsely claimed Jewish children in the UK are taught to view Arabs as "cockroaches" and that "one Jewish life is worth thousands of Arab lives". The message, broadcast without challenge, was condemned as antisemitic by Jewish organisations including the Campaign Against Antisemitism and the Board of Deputies. O'Brien later stated he had read the message "in good faith" and regretted not questioning its content. Hertfordshire's police commissioner subsequently called for O'Brien's suspension and an independent investigation.

=== Podcast ===
In October 2017, O'Brien began hosting a podcast at Joe titled Unfiltered with James O'Brien, which ran until November 2018. Guests included Russell Brand, Alastair Campbell, Lily Allen, Jon Ronson, Gary Lineker, and Sir Nick Clegg.

A new podcast was started in March 2019 titled Full Disclosure with James O'Brien. The first guest to appear on this format was former Prime Minister Tony Blair. Other notable guests have included David Mitchell, Nicky Campbell, Margaret Atwood, Michael Morpurgo, and Keir Starmer. Sir Ed Davey, the Leader of the Liberal Democrats, was a guest in February 2024.

=== Books ===
In 2015 he wrote the book Loathe Thy Neighbour, which examined attitudes towards immigration, and was published by Elliott & Thompson.

In his 2018 book How To Be Right... in a World Gone Wrong, O'Brien offers his opinions on various current affairs. The book reached fifth position in The Sunday Times' Top 10 best sellers' list in December that year.

In 2023, his book How They Broke Britain was published by W. H Allen, and quickly became a bestseller.

== Political ideology ==
O'Brien has stated that he voted for Boris Johnson in the 2008 London mayoral election, though he later said he regretted his vote. Politically, O'Brien said in 2017 that his views are 'liberal' rather than 'left-wing'. In 2017 and 2018 he said that he was politically homeless, being against the British left such as the Labour Party under Jeremy Corbyn, but enjoys support from the liberal media of British politics e.g. the New Statesman and The Guardian. In 2023, O'Brien was ranked 38th in the New Statesman's "Left Power List 2023", with the publication describing him as a "liberal firebrand" and "master of the sound-bite".

He frequently discussed Brexit with callers who voted to leave the EU in the 2016 United Kingdom European Union membership referendum, often claiming that Leave voters had been deceived by the pro-Brexit campaigns to vote against their own interests.

== Personal life ==
O'Brien is married to Lucy McDonald, a psychotherapist, and has two daughters.

He is a Kidderminster Harriers F.C. fan. His father Jim died on the 10 December 2012, and his funeral was held at St Mary's Catholic Church Harvington, Kidderminster.

== Publications ==
- Loathe Thy Neighbour, 2015, Elliott and Thompson
- How To Be Right... in a World gone Wrong, 2018, W. H. Allen
- How Not To Be Wrong: The Art of Changing Your Mind, 2020, W. H. Allen
- How They Broke Britain, 2023, W. H. Allen
