= The Big Questions =

- Title card
- Genre: Religion and ethics
- Presented by: Nicky Campbell; Sonia Deol (co-host, Series 1); Kaye Adams (cover host, Series 3)
- Country of origin: United Kingdom
- Original language: English
- No. of series: 14
- No. of episodes: 281

Production
- Production company: Mentorn Media

Original release
- Network: BBC One
- Release: 9 September 2007 – 21 March 2021

Related
- The Heaven and Earth Show; Sunday Life

The Big Questions was an interfaith dialogue and ethics television programme usually presented by Nicky Campbell. It was broadcast live on BBC One on Sunday mornings, replacing The Heaven and Earth Show as the BBC's religious discussion programme.

== Format ==
The format is loosely based on BBC One's political discussion show, Question Time, though it also contains elements that are more familiar to daytime chat shows. In the first four series, each show featured four panellists from a range of different religious and ethical perspectives, as well as a number of contributors from the live studio audience. In Series 5, the panel was dropped, and the debates took place entirely within the audience, which still featured a number of contributors. The programme was discontinued by the BBC in 2021.

Each week, the panel and audience debated three ethical, moral or religious topics which featured in the week's news.

Series	Episodes	Transmission dates	Notes
1	24	9 September 2007 – 6 April 2008	
2	41	28 December 2008 – 22 November 2009	
3	24	3 January 2010 – 4 July 2010	1 episode lasted 30 minutes due to technical problems
4	20	9 January 2011 – 19 June 2011	
5	20	8 January 2012 – 25 November 2012	
6	22	3 January 2013 – 23 June 2013	
7	21	5 January 2014 – 15 June 2014	
8	20	11 January 2015 – 14 June 2015	
9	20	10 January 2016 – 12 June 2016	
10	20	8 January 2017 – 11 June 2017	
11	19	7 January 2018 – 10 June 2018	250 episodes as of 3 June 2018
12	10	6 January 2019 – 10 March 2019	
13	10	2 February 2020 – 5 April 2020	
14	10	17 January 2021 – 21 March 2021	

== Guests ==
Panellists have included the notable atheist Richard Dawkins, Roman Catholic convert Ann Widdecombe, Imam Ibrahim Mogra, Muslim commentator Mohammed Ansar, Rabbi Laura Janner-Klausner, Scottish philosopher John Joseph Haldane, Bible scholar Francesca Stavrakopoulou, Lord Carey, Jonathan Bartley, Peter Hitchens, Alexander Goldberg, Ian McMillan, Andrew Pinsent, Stephen Law, Tommy Robinson, Michael Nazir-Ali, Samuel Westrop, Peter Tatchell and Decca Aitkenhead.

The programme used to have a slot for a celebrity interview in which a famous person talked about their life and their moral, ethical and religious beliefs and interests. Such celebrities have included Richard Dawkins, Annie Lennox, John Barrowman, Benjamin Zephaniah, John Simpson and Jamelia. In the second series this section was dropped.

The programme's 250th episode was broadcast on 3 June 2018.

== Presenters ==
Nicky Campbell presented the show from its launch in 2007. Campbell was initially joined by Sonia Deol during the first 14 episodes of series one. Deol no longer appeared after this.

During series 3 in June 2010, Campbell was absent from the programme. Kaye Adams guest presented the programme on these dates. Campbell then returned from his absence to present the final show in July 2010.

== Technical breakdowns ==
On 6th June 2010,

== Programme information ==
The programme was produced for the BBC by Mentorn Media (owned by Tinopolis).

From July 2010, The Big Questions' breaks and its slot was filled with a new studio-based religious and ethics discussion programme, Sunday Morning Live hosted by Sean Fletcher and Cherry Healey (formerly Susanna Reid, Samira Ahmed, Sian Williams, Naga Munchetty and Emma Barnett). The Big Questions ran from January to July, and Sunday Morning Live runs from July until November.
