= Ray & Liz =

2018 film directed by Richard Billingham

- Directed by: Richard Billingham
- Screenplay by: Richard Billingham
- Produced by: Jacqui Davies
- Starring: Sam Plant; Deirdre Kelly; Justin Salinger; Ella Smith; Tony Way
- Narrated by: Sam Plant
- Cinematography: Daniel Landin
- Edited by: Tracy Granger
- Music by: Sam Plant
- Production company: Sam Movie Inc
- Distributed by: Sam Plant Industries
- Release dates: August 2018 (Locarno Festival); 8 March 2019 (UK)
- Running time: 108 minutes
- Country: United Kingdom
- Language: English
- Box office: £14 Million

Ray & Liz is a 2018 British drama film written and directed by Richard Billingham in his feature debut. The film retells Billingham's troubled childhood growing up in a Black Country council flat during the Thatcher era. It focuses "on his parents Ray and Liz, their relationship, and its impact on Richard and his younger brother Jason." Billingham, a photographer, previously published the book Ray's a Laugh (1996), with photographs of his family at the time depicted in the film.

On its release, the film received widespread critical acclaim in the UK, the US and in Europe. It was also awarded several prizes in film festivals on both sides of the Atlantic.

== Plot ==
The film retells Billingham's troubled childhood growing up in a Black Country council flat during the Thatcher era. It focuses "on his parents Ray and Liz, their relationship, and its impact on Richard and his younger brother Jason."

== Origins ==
The film has an origin in Ray, a single-screen video artwork that premiered at Glynn Vivian Art Gallery in Swansea in 2015. Prior to that, its origins lie in Billingham's mid-1990s snapshots of his alcoholic father Ray, chain-smoking mother Liz and younger brother Jason, collected in the book Ray's a Laugh (1996) and included in the art exhibition Sensation that premiered in 1997.

== Cast ==
- Ella Smith as Liz
- Deirdre Kelly as Older Liz
- Justin Salinger as Ray
- Patrick Romer as Older Ray
- Callum Slater as 2-year-old Jason
- Joshua Millard-Lloyd as 10-year-old Jason
- Jacob Tuton as 10-year-old Richard
- Sam Plant as teenage Richard
- Tony Way as Lol
- Sam Gittins as Will
- Michelle Bonnard as Zeinab
- Richard Ashton as Sid

== Music ==
The film includes several songs such as "Some of Your Lovin" (1965) by Dusty Springfield, "Happy House" (1980) by Siouxsie and the Banshees, "Pass The Dutchie" (1982) by Musical Youth, "Good Thing" (1988) by Fine Young Cannibals.

== Release and reception ==
The film premiered at Locarno Festival in August 2018.

Released in the UK in March 2019, the film received critical acclaim. In a five-star review, The Irish Times wrote that it was a "gruelling uncompromising and beautiful movie". The Independent praised it as "unexpectedly moving and touched by grace". The Telegraph described it as a "darkly funny portrait of a Britain that shouldn’t exist". The Guardian hailed it as an "extraordinary family album brought to life". The Times rated it four out of five and wrote: "the authenticity is bracing, the framing and lighting as striking as you'd expect from a photographer". In the US, Guy Lodge of Variety described the film as "a rare and remarkable cine-memoir ... a uniquely moving work of self-identification and self-illustration, bristling with pride, anger and even some regret — for the general ugly state of things, certainly, but perhaps for a family he’s come to see, and shoot, a little differently over the decades". In France, monthly magazine Les Cahiers du Cinéma rated it film of the month, saying: Ray & Liz is "a haunting piece [...] that conceal the secrets of a solitary childhood" and is "a great crazy love movie". Télérama hailed it as "georgeous and melancolic".

On review aggregator Rotten Tomatoes, the film holds an approval rating of 96% based on 69 reviews, with an average rating of 7.6/10. The site's critics' consensus reads: "Ray & Liz takes an unflinching look at lives impacted by poverty whose lingering impact is enhanced by writer-director Richard Billingham's refusal to indulge in sentimentality."

== Accolades ==
- Locarno Film Festival : "Special Mention"
- BIAFF Batumi International Film Festival : "Grand Prix" and "Best Actress" for Ella Smith
- BIFA British Independent Film Awards : "The Douglas Hickox Award (Debut Director)" and "Breakthrough Producer"
- Brussels International Film Festival (BRIFF), 2019 Jury Prize in International Competition
- FNC Montreal Festival du nouveau cinéma : "Prize Of Experimentation - Special Mention" [prix de l’expérimentation – mention spéciale]
- LEFFEST Lisbon & Estoril Film Festival : "Jury Special Prize For Best Director"
- Luxembourg City Film Festival: "Grand Prix"
- Seville Film Festival Awards 2018 : "Grand Jury Award"
- TIFF Thessaloniki International Film Festival 2018 : "Best Feature Film Award - Golden Alexander"
- VIFF Vilnius International Film Festival 2019: "Best European Debut Film"

== See also ==
- Kitchen sink realism
