= Deirdre Kelly =

British television personality and actress (born 1971)

Deirdre "Dee" Kelly (born 1971), also known as White Dee, is a British television personality and actress. In 2014 and 2015 she appeared in the television documentary series Benefits Street, and in 2014 she took part in Celebrity Big Brother. She plays Liz in the 2019 film Ray & Liz, directed by Richard Billingham.

In 2014, Kelly spoke at a Policy Exchange fringe meeting at the Conservative Party Conference in Birmingham.

== Film ==
- Ray (2015) – single-screen video artwork, she plays "Liz"
- Ray & Liz (2018) – feature film, as "Liz"

== Television ==
- Benefits Street
- Celebrity Big Brother (British series 14)
- White Dee: What's the Fuss About? (2015) – documentary
- When Reality TV Goes Horribly Wrong (2017) – documentary
