= Vivid (arts centre) =

Coordinates: 52.4770°N 1.8822°W

Vivid (stylised as VIVID) was a centre for the production and exhibition of media art, located in the Digbeth area of Birmingham, England.

Vivid commissioned and exhibited work both for its own exhibition space and for other locations, provided spaces and resources for the production of interdisciplinary art and hosted a programme of residencies for visiting artists, commissioned major new works and large scale touring exhibitions from artists and exhibited artists' work.

After failing to win Arts Council funding Vivid closed in 2012. Vivid Projects was started soon after by the Vivid curatorial team and is based at Minerva Works in Digbeth.

== Function ==
Vivid commissioned and exhibited work both for its own exhibition space and for other locations, provided spaces and resources for the production of interdisciplinary art and hosted a programme of residencies for visiting artists, commissioned major new works and large scale touring exhibitions from artists including Haroon Mirza, Richard Billingham, Heather & Ivan Morison and exhibited artists from 1960 Fluxus movement to rising art stars. In 2008–11 it generated 27 international residencies and exhibitions with Vivid commissions presented at the Venice Biennale, Frieze Art Fair, The Art of Ideas and British Art Show 7; and touring to London and Gothenburg.

Vivid produced and curated emerging and mid-career artists and presented their work in local, national and international contexts. Described in The Guardian as 'superb' the critically acclaimed public programme presented a wide variety of new commissions, thematic shows, talks, screenings and pop up events year round.

== History ==
The company began trading as Vivid in the late 1990s, but was established as Birmingham Centre for Media Arts in 1992, when TURC Video amalgamated with the community arts organisation Wide Angle. The conjunction of the two entities created a hybrid resource unique in Birmingham: a film, video and photography workshop creating community access to what at the time was the dominant means of visual communications.

Popularly known in the 1990s as BCMA, the centre adopted the name Vivid following a re-location to The Big Peg in Birmingham's jewellery quarter and began several years of digital image making, digital video training and artist development. From 2000 Vivid concentrated on developing contemporary new media and artist moving image through production, commissioning, exhibition and event programmes.

The organisation moved to its final home, called The Garage – a former motor garage built in the 1950s – from its previous location in the Jewellery Quarter in April 2005. Renovation of the large MOT garage, in order to provide an exhibition and events programme alongside artist production, created a flexible, multi-purpose space for Digbeth – the first in the area. The Garage, occupied 3,000 sq ft (280 m^{2}) and still bore the evidence of its former use as a vehicle repair workshop, including a large area marked "MOT Bay".

After failing to win Arts Council funding Vivid closed in 2012. Vivid Projects was started soon after by the Vivid curatorial team and is based at Minerva Works in Digbeth.
