= Tommy Robinson =

British far-right activist (born 1982)

- Robinson in 2025

Leader of the English Defence League
- In office 2009–2013
- Preceded by: Position established
- Succeeded by: Tim Ablitt

Advisor to the Leader of UKIP
- In office 23 November 2018 – 3 June 2019
- Leader: Gerard Batten

Personal details
- Born: Stephen Christopher Yaxley; 27 November 1982 (age 43) Luton, England
- Spouse: Jenna Vowles (m. 2011; div. 2021)
- Children: 3
- Known for: English Defence League; Far-right activism
- Other names: Andrew McMaster; Paul Harris; Wayne King; Stephen Lennon
- Political party: Advance UK (2025–26); For Britain (2022); BFP (2012); BNP (2004–05)
- Movement: Islamophobia; far-right

Stephen Christopher Yaxley-Lennon (né Yaxley; born 27 November 1982), better known as Tommy Robinson, is a British far-right, anti-Islam activist with multiple criminal convictions. Described as "one of [the] UK's most prominent far-right activists", he co-founded the English Defence League (EDL) and was its leader from 2009 to 2013.

Before the EDL, Robinson was a member of the British National Party (BNP), a British fascist political party, from 2004 to 2005. For a short time in 2012, he was joint vice-chairman of the British Freedom Party (BFP). In 2015, after leaving the EDL, he became involved with the development of Pegida UK, a now-defunct British chapter of the German Pegida. From 2017 to 2018, he wrote and appeared in videos on the Canadian website Rebel News. In 2018, he also served as a political advisor to Gerard Batten, then the leader of the UK Independence Party (UKIP).

Robinson's convictions include offences of assault, threats, harassment, and fraud, as well as contempt of court rulings relating to his videos, and he served five prison terms between 2005 and 2025. Robinson is also known for creating self-produced videos presented in a documentary format, on topics including the grooming gangs scandal. Some of these videos have been found in court to include defamatory false statements about their subjects.

In June 2022, Robinson said that he lost £100,000 in gambling before declaring bankruptcy in March 2021. He also said he owed an estimated £160,000 to HM Revenue and Customs (HMRC). In August 2024, The Times said that he owed in the region of £2 million to his creditors, and was the subject of an HMRC investigation over unpaid taxes.

== Early life ==
Stephen Christopher Yaxley-Lennon was born in Luton on 27 November 1982. According to him in 2013, he was born Stephen Yaxley in London, and later adopted by his stepfather, Thomas Lennon. He attended Putteridge High School.

Robinson had an Irish mother and an English father. His mother worked at a bakery and at Vauxhall's car plant in Luton. After leaving school he applied to study aircraft engineering at Luton Airport: "I got an apprenticeship 600 people applied for, and they took four people on". He qualified in 2003 after five years of study, but lost his job when he was convicted of assaulting an off-duty police officer in a drunken argument for which he served a 12-month prison sentence.

The Tommy Robinson from whom Yaxley took his name was a prominent member of the Luton Town MIGs, a football hooligan crew which follows Luton Town. The pseudonym successfully hid his identity and criminal history until the connection was uncovered in July 2010 by Searchlight magazine. He has also used the names Andrew McMaster, Paul Harris, Wayne King, and Stephen Lennon.

== English Defence League ==
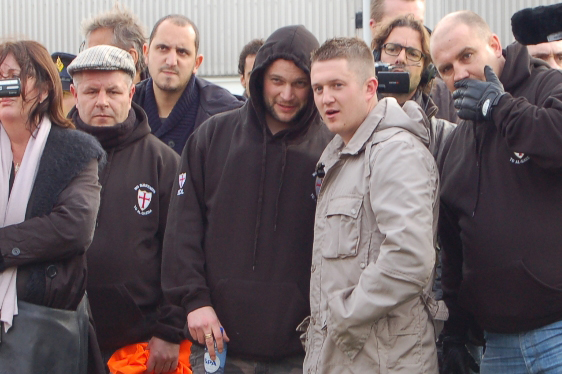
Robinson (in light grey coat) with EDL demonstrators in Amsterdam in 2010

Robinson founded the English Defence League (EDL) in 2009 with his cousin Kevin Carroll, and became its leader with Carroll as deputy leader. Robinson stated that he was prompted to found the EDL after reading a newspaper article about local Islamists attempting to recruit men to fight for the Taliban in Afghanistan outside a bakery in Luton. Many of the EDL's early members were recruited from football club supporters in Luton, London, Bristol and other English cities. Robinson described the EDL, shortly after it was founded, as being "against the rise of radical Islam". Paraic O'Brien, writing for the BBC, said that the organisation's rank-and-file were "loosely affiliated with football hooligan firms" and described themselves as anti-Islam. Robinson founded the European Defence League, a co-ordination of groups similar to the EDL operating in different European countries.

In 2011, Robinson was convicted of using "threatening, abusive or insulting behaviour" during a fight between supporters of Luton Town and Newport County in Luton the previous year. Robinson reportedly led the group of Luton fans and played an integral part in starting a 100-man brawl, during which he chanted, "EDL till I die." He was sentenced to a 12-month community rehabilitation order with 150 hours of unpaid work and a three-year ban from attending football matches.

Robinson was arrested again after an EDL demonstration in Tower Hamlets in September 2011 for breach of bail conditions, as he had been banned from attending that demonstration. Robinson later began a hunger strike while on remand in HM Prison Bedford, saying that he was a "political prisoner of the state", and refused to eat what he believed was halal meat. A handful of EDL supporters protested outside the prison in support of Robinson during his incarceration; the support peaked at a turnout of 100 protesters on 10 September. Robinson was released on bail on 12 September.

On 29 September 2011, Robinson was convicted of common assault after headbutting a fellow EDL member at a rally in Blackburn in April that year. He was sentenced to 12 weeks of imprisonment, suspended for 12 months. On 8 November 2011, Robinson held a protest on the rooftop of the FIFA headquarters in Zürich against FIFA's ruling that the England national football team could not wear a Remembrance poppy symbol on their shirts. For this he was fined £3,000 and jailed for three days. Robinson said that he was assaulted on 22 December 2011. He said this occurred after he stopped his car because another car flashed its lights at him, and that a group of three men attacked and beat him, until they were stopped by the arrival of a "good Samaritan". Robinson said that the attackers were of Asian appearance. Bedfordshire Police stated that it was "unclear what the motive for the attack was".

In 2012 Robinson announced that he had joined the British Freedom Party (BFP). He was appointed as its joint vice-chairman along with Carroll after the EDL and the BFP agreed an electoral pact in 2011. However, on 11 October 2012, Robinson resigned from the BFP to concentrate on EDL activities. Robinson has been described as one of the counter-jihad movement's most influential figures, with one report stating that by 2013 "Tommy Robinson now holds almost legendary status within this nascent movement, and is considered the "rock star" of the ECJM [European Counter-Jihad Movement]." Robinson attended official international counter-jihad events in 2012 in Aarhus, Denmark, Stockholm, Sweden and Brussels, Belgium.

In April 2012, Robinson took part in the BBC series The Big Questions, in which far-right extremism was debated. The series saw the British Muslim commentator Mo Ansar inviting Robinson to join him and his family for dinner, resulting in several meetings over the next 18 months to discuss Islam, Islamism and the Muslim community; the meetings were captured in the BBC documentary When Tommy Met Mo.

On 8 October 2013, the think tank Quilliam held a press conference with Robinson and the EDL's deputy leader Kevin Carroll to announce that Robinson and Carroll had left the EDL. Robinson said that he had been considering leaving for a long time because of concerns over the "dangers of far-right extremism". He said, "I acknowledge the dangers of far-right extremism and the ongoing need to counter Islamist ideology not with violence but with better, democratic ideas." He left the EDL alongside 10 other senior figures, with Tim Ablitt becoming the EDL's new leader. When Robinson was questioned by The Guardian about having blamed "every single Muslim" for "getting away" with the 7 July 2005 London bombings, and for calling Islam a "fascist and violent" religion, he apologised. He also said that he would now give evidence to the police to help in their investigation of racists within the EDL, adding that "his future work would involve taking on radicalism on all fronts". He said in his autobiography that he was paid £2,000 per month for Quilliam to take credit for his leaving the EDL, which a Quilliam spokesperson denied.

== Activities since 2014 ==
Robinson spoke at the Oxford Union on 26 November 2014. Unite Against Fascism (UAF) protested against his appearance, criticising the Union for allowing him the platform when, according to UAF, he had not renounced the views of the EDL. Robinson told the audience he was not allowed to talk about certain issues because he was out on prison licence. He said, "I regain my freedom of speech on the 22 July 2015." He criticised "politicians, the media, and police for failing to tackle certain criminal activities because of the fear of being labelled Islamophobic." He said that HM Prison Woodhill had become "an ISIS training camp", and that radicals were "running the wings".

After release from licence at the end of his sentence, Robinson returned to anti-Islam demonstrations with Pegida UK, a British offshoot of Pegida, a German anti-immigration organisation founded in Dresden amidst the 2015 European migrant crisis. Addressing a Pegida anti-Islam rally in October 2015, Robinson spoke out against what he perceived to be the threat of Islamist terrorists posing as refugees. He announced the creation of a "British chapter" of Pegida in December 2015. He said that alcohol and fighting would not be permitted because "it's too serious now for that stuff", and told The Daily Telegraph that a mass demonstration would take place across Europe on 6 February 2016. On 14 February 2016 Robinson was attacked and treated at a hospital after leaving a nightclub in Essex. Robinson wrote an autobiography, Enemy of the State, which he self-published in 2015.

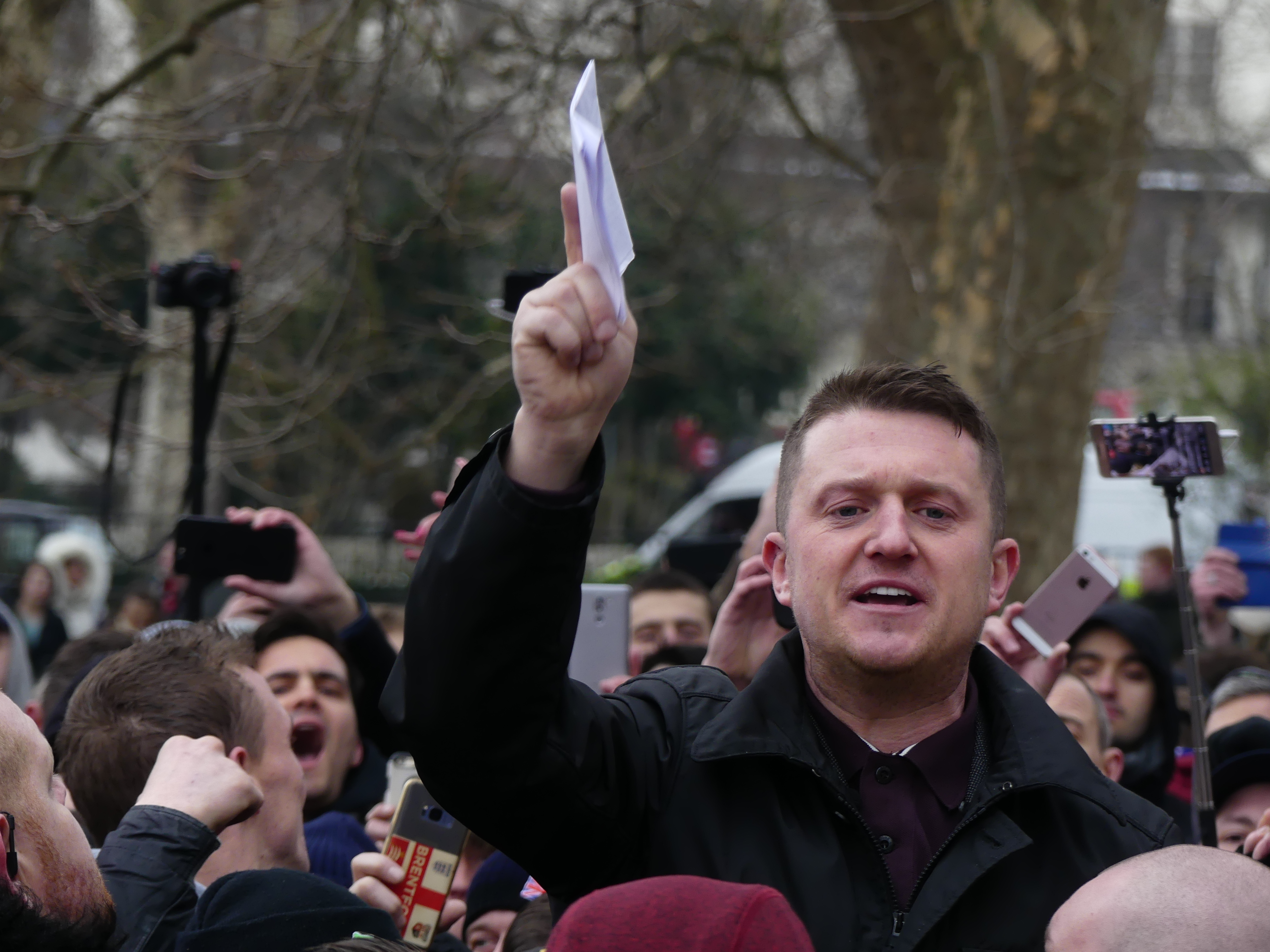
Robinson at Speakers' Corner on 18 March 2018

Robinson travelled to watch UEFA Euro 2016 in France and demonstrated with a T-shirt and English flag ridiculing the Islamic State of Iraq and the Levant (ISIL). Bedfordshire Police imposed a football banning order on him on his return; his solicitor Alison Gurden accused the police of equating the proscribed terrorist group with all Muslims in their action. In September, a judge at Luton Magistrates' Court dismissed the case, calling the prosecution's evidence "vague" and "cagey".

On 27 August 2016, 18 Luton Town football supporters, including Robinson and his family, were ejected by police from a pub in Cambridge on the day of the Cambridge United versus Luton football match. Robinson said he had been victimised, and complaints were submitted to Cambridge Police. In March 2019, at Peterborough County Court, Robinson accused Cambridgeshire Constabulary of harassment, direct discrimination, humiliation, causing him stress and anxiety and breaching his human rights, namely the right to family life, right to freedom of conscience or religion, and freedom of expression. The claims related to police behaviour around Robinson possibly being issued a section 35 dispersal order at the pub after the match in 2016. The court rejected Robinson's claims and ordered him to pay £20,000 towards costs. Robinson said he would appeal against the ruling.

Robinson was a correspondent for Rebel News, a Canadian far-right website. In May 2017 he was arrested for contempt of court after he attempted to film the defendants in an ongoing rape trial outside Canterbury Crown Court. Robinson's second self-published book, Mohammed's Koran: Why Muslims Kill For Islam was co-authored with Peter McLoughlin and released in 2017. Amazon has refused to sell it. Robinson was involved in a fist fight at Royal Ascot later in June 2017, for which Piers Morgan criticised him on Twitter.

In March 2018, Robinson attended court in support of Mark Meechan, a Scottish YouTuber who had been charged for a hate crime after posting footage online of a dog performing Nazi salutes in response to the phrases "gas the Jews" and "Sieg Heil". Meechan was found guilty because the video was "antisemitic and racist in nature" and was aggravated by religious prejudice. Meechan said that the video was taken out of context and was a joke to annoy his girlfriend. In October 2018, further controversy arose after Robinson posted a joint photo with two dozen young British Army "recruits" as he described them. He also posted on his Facebook page a video of the occasion in which the soldiers allegedly cheered him, shouting his name. The British Army launched an investigation, saying, "Far-right ideology is completely at odds with the values and ethos of the armed forces. The armed forces have robust measures in place to ensure those exhibiting extremist views are neither tolerated nor permitted to serve." The Government's lead counter-extremism commissioner praised the army's response, saying, "This is typical of the far right. They manipulate and exploit their way into the mainstream, often targeting the military and co-opting its symbols. Tommy Robinson's attention-seeking is cover for divisive anti-Muslim hatred that is causing real harm to individuals, communities, and society in general."

In November 2018, he was appointed as "grooming gang advisor" to UKIP under Gerard Batten. In 2020, he visited Barrow-in-Furness, Cumbria, following protests in support of Eleanor Williams, a teenager accused and later convicted of perverting the course of justice by lying about being raped by a grooming gang. Robinson visited the town despite her family asking him to stay away. In 2019, he appeared to show support for an ex-British soldier facing prosecution for the murder of Irish civilians on Bloody Sunday (1972) in Northern Ireland. Robinson wore a badge that said "I support soldiers A–Z" after "Soldier F" was set to face charges for the murder of civilians. In January 2019, Robinson livestreamed himself causing a lockdown, by leading a group that surrounded a library where Stewart McDonald, then the member of Parliament for Glasgow South, was holding a 'surgery'. The group included the convicted armed kidnapper Daniel Thomas. The library was reportedly bombarded with phone calls. McDonald was eventually escorted away by police and said Robinson's party had blocked emergency exits.

In February 2019, using his Facebook account, Robinson wrote "I guess it's ok to rape white women then?" next to a Rape Crisis flyer about specialist services for ethnic minority victims, resulting in hundreds of racist and abusive phone calls to the centre from Robinson's supporters. The centre, which was providing support for rape victims of all ethnic backgrounds, condemned Robinson's post for "disrupting much-needed service provision for victims and survivors of sexual violence and abuse of all ethnicities and backgrounds". The centre included specialised services for ethnic minorities because "some groups of women who have survived sexual violence and abuse can face additional barriers to accessing services, including related to language and to the fear and/or past or current experience of racism and racial discrimination".

On 23 February 2019, Robinson held a rally in MediaCityUK outside the BBC's Salford, Greater Manchester offices to protest against the BBC's investigative current affairs programme Panorama and its presenter John Sweeney. During the rally Robinson launched his film Panodrama that was broadcast on a large screen to the crowd of 4000 people, showing undercover footage of Sweeney, filmed by Robinson's former aide Lucy Brown. Batten spoke in support during the rally. Robinson said the aim of the protest was to make a stand "against the corrupt media" and called for the BBC licence fee to be scrapped. Concurrently, about 500 people attended a counter-protest by anti-fascists. In response the BBC made an announcement that it strongly rejects any suggestion that its journalism is biased. Confirming that an upcoming Panorama episode was being prepared to investigate Robinson and his activities, it added that all programmes the BBC broadcasts follow BBC's "strict editorial guidelines". Regarding some of Sweeney's remarks during Robinson's Panodrama film exposé, the BBC announcement added: "Some of the footage which has been released was recorded without our knowledge during this investigation and John Sweeney made some offensive and inappropriate remarks, for which he apologises."

On 4 March 2019, at 11 pm, Robinson arrived uninvited outside the home of a journalist who covers far-right issues and attempted to intimidate him. Robinson revealed the journalist's address on a livestream and threatened to reveal the addresses of other journalists. He left after police arrived, but returned at 5 am. Robinson said this was an act of retaliation for having been served a legal letter at his parents-in-law's home, an act which he said was videoed and which he described as harassment. Robinson gave no indication that the journalist he attempted to intimidate had been involved in that alleged act. The journalist said the letter had been given to a police officer 50 metres from the house in question.

In January 2020, Robinson was given the Sappho Award (also known as the International Free Press award) by the Danish Free Press Society at Christiansborg Palace in Copenhagen. The International Free Press Society is closely connected to the counterjihad movement and Liz Fekete, the executive director of the Institute of Race Relations in Britain, has suggested that it is an instrument for pushing the boundaries of hate speech.

On 1 November 2020, Robinson was arrested at Speakers' Corner in Hyde Park, London, for breaking COVID-19 lockdown rules. Robinson has promoted debunked conspiracy theories about COVID-19 vaccines.

In May 2021, he attended a march in London in support of Israel.

In January 2022, in response to the Telford child sexual exploitation scandal, Robinson held a protest where he screened his 73-minute documentary style video about Muslim grooming gangs, titled The Rape of Britain: Survivor Stories.

In August 2025, Robinson shared a video on Twitter of a black man and his brother playing with his white granddaughters in a park in North Yorkshire, falsely accusing them of paedophilia, which resulted in the family being racially abused with false paedophilia accusations. Labour MP for Redcar Anna Turley had to write a reference letter of good behaviour after the victim was suspended by his management. Turley stated that there was "no place for hate in our town" and said she was "heartbroken" for the family "who've been targeted and abused because of Tommy Robinson's poisonous lies".

In October 2025, some Metropolitan Police officers were suspended for allegedly supporting Robinson's anti-Muslim stance.

In January 2026, Robinson met Italian far-right politician and Deputy Prime Minister of Italy Matteo Salvini.

In February 2026, Robinson was reported to have left the UK following alleged threats against him in an Islamic State publication. It is believed Robinson was informed by the Bedfordshire Police of the threat by the ISIS group. Robinson had travelled to Washington, D.C., and visited the United States Department of State, where he had met with Joe Rittenhouse, a senior adviser to the U.S. Department of State, and Randy Fine, a U.S. Representative from Florida.

On 1 June 2026, he addressed a crowd outside Southampton central police station at a "Justice for Henry Nowak" protest, following the sentencing of Vickrum Digwa, found guilty of Nowak's murder.

In November 2026, Robinson became involved in violent scenes at a boxing event, organised by internet personality HSTikkyTokky, in Kilkenny, Ireland. Robinson reportedly cited false statistics about Muslim men and sexual offences before a bout involving a Muslim contestant.

=== 2017 Communication with Finsbury Park mosque attacker ===
It was revealed in court that the perpetrator of the 2017 Finsbury Park mosque terrorist attack had subscribed to email updates from Robinson's website and read Robinson's tweets in the lead-up to the attack. Robinson's tweet mocking people for responding to terrorism with the phrase "don't look back in anger" was found in the note at the scene of the attack. An email from Robinson's account to the attacker Darren Osborne shortly before read, "Dear Darren, you know about the terrible crimes committed against [name redacted] of Sunderland. Police let the suspects go ... why? It is because the suspects are refugees from Syria and Iraq. It's a national outrage ..." Another email read, "There is a nation within a nation forming just beneath the surface of the UK. It is a nation built on hatred, on violence and on Islam."

Robinson responded on Twitter to the attack, writing "The mosque where the attack happened tonight has a long history of creating terrorists & radical jihadists & promoting hate & segregation" and, "I'm not justifying it, I've said many times if government or police don't sort these centres of hate they will create monsters as seen tonight." Robinson's statements were widely criticised in the media as inciting hatred. Appearing the next morning on Good Morning Britain, Robinson held up the Quran and described it as a "violent and cursed book". The host, Piers Morgan, accused him of "stirring up hatred like a bigoted lunatic", and Robinson's appearance drew a number of complaints to Ofcom.

Commander Dean Haydon of Scotland Yard's counter-terrorism command said that online material from Robinson had played a "significant role" in how Osborne was radicalised and "brainwashed". Mark Rowley, the outgoing assistant commissioner of the Metropolitan Police and the UK's most senior counter-terrorism officer said that there is "no doubt" that material posted online by people including Robinson drove the Finsbury Park terror attacker to targeting Muslims. In response, Robinson said, "I'm gonna find Mark Rowley."

=== Hearts of Oak ===
In February 2020, Robinson, Carl Benjamin (also known as "Sargon of Akkad") and other former UKIP members launched the far-right organisation Hearts of Oak. At its launch the members said that it is not a political party but a "cultural movement", whose key issues include "strong borders, immigration, and national identity", "authorities privileging and protecting Islam alone" and "freedom of speech". Other contributors to Hearts of Oak include Niall McRae, the co-author of an Islamophobic and antisemitic conspiracy booklet, and Catherine Blaiklock, the former leader of the Brexit Party. Vice World News found eight separate companies currently or formerly run from the same address whose directors are members of the Orthodox Conservatives, the Bow Group or Turning Point UK.

Robinson and Benjamin pre-recorded a speech that was displayed at a protest on 1 August 2020 demanding the deportation of the men involved in the Rochdale child sex abuse ring. Richard Inman, the founder of Veterans Against Terrorism, a campaign group with far-right associations, was also a speaker and demanded the death penalty, stating "this rape epidemic" is "carried out by one section of the community", referring to Muslim Pakistani men. However, a 2011 government report showed that almost 85% of men found guilty of sexual activity with a minor in England and Wales were white. Antifascist counter-protestors produced a leaflet that said "Hearts of Oak are ideologically based on Islamophobia, racism, and nationalism" and that it was racist to single out Muslims as perpetrators of sexual assaults, when people of all races commit such crimes.

On 18 September 2022, Standing for Women, founded by Kellie-Jay Keen-Minshull, held a public rally in Brighton. Hearts of Oak attended and live-streamed from the front of the inner circle at the rally.

=== Russian links (2020–2026) ===
In February 2020, Robinson travelled to Russia, visiting Moscow and Saint Petersburg for a series of talks, meetings and media appearances in Russian media, such as Russia Today. Russian state media gave Robinson positive coverage, depicting him as a victim of censorship and oppression by the European Union. He voiced support for Russian president Vladimir Putin. The New York Times alleged that the trip "was actually a front for his real purpose, which was to seek out Russian bank accounts where he could hide his money". The following year, he made a video in support of the Russian political party For Truth (Russian: За правду; Za Pravdu). Following the 2022 Russian invasion of Ukraine, Robinson spread pro-Russian disinformation about the war. In June 2026, Robinson met Errol Musk in a Moscow hotel, during a trip funded by the Musk Foundation. He later said that "Russia is not the enemy of Britain", but was criticised by Liberal Democrat leader Ed Davey who described Robinson as "a useful idiot for a hostile state". On his return to the UK, Robinson was briefly detained at Heathrow Airport and his mobile phones were seized for examination.

In February 2026, a Byline Times investigation found that before his 2020 trip to Russia, Robinson was hired as a "goodwill ambassador" by the MMBF Trust (Matthew Martino Benevolent Fund), self-described as a "charity" but not registered as such. The Trust is part of network centred around London Post, an organisation that poses as local media but is operated by Moscow Media Group and its subsidiary MMG Brainstorming, directly working for the Presidential Administration of Russia, Russian Federation Council, State Duma and other Russian government organisations.

=== 2024 United Kingdom riots ===
After leaving the UK for Cyprus in July 2024, Robinson was accused of spreading misinformation about the perpetrator of the mass stabbing of children in Southport. False claims that the perpetrator was a Muslim asylum seeker led to violent far-right riots across the UK. In fact the attacker was the UK-born son of Christian Tutsi refugees from Rwanda. Rioters in Southport were heard chanting Robinson's name and "Who the f*** is Allah?" In August 2024, prosecutors in the UK began to investigate Robinson for his alleged role in inciting the riots.

=== 2025 public promotion of Robinson by Israeli government ===
In mid-October 2025, Robinson travelled to Israel for a high-profile tour as the guest of Amichai Chikli, Ministry of Diaspora Affairs and Combating Antisemitism in the government of Benjamin Netanyahu. According to Israeli media, Robinson’s air fares and accommodation were paid for by the Israeli government. Accompanied by Chikli, Robinson visited Israel's parliament, a West Bank Zionist settlement and Israel's border with Gaza. Robinson's visit culminated in an address to hundreds of people at the Tel Aviv International Salon, where he denounced Britain’s recognition of a Palestinian state. A fervent Israeli audience applauded Robinson, and assaulted and threw out one person protesting at his invitation.

The Israeli government was criticised for inviting Robinson by the Board of Deputies of British Jews, who labelled Robinson "a thug who represents the very worst of Britain". Subsequently, an Israeli parliamentary committee ordered Chikli to apologise to British Jews for failing to consult them before inviting Robinson.

Chikli's invitation to Robinson reflected Chikli’s clearly stated view that in many countries an increase in sympathy for the Palestinian cause stemmed from the growth of Muslim populations due to immigration and hence that foreign far-right, anti-Muslim, anti-immigrant politicians could be useful new allies for Israel. British anti-fascist magazine Searchlight accused Chikli of "facilitating the mainstreaming of the ideological heirs of Europe's darkest corners of pre-war fascism and post-war racism".

Chikli's choice of Robinson for an official visit matched Robinson's rising status in international far-right politics as someone whose rallies could now attract speakers like Elon Musk, Steve Bannon and Geert Wilders. According to the Observer, a major factor in Robinson's elevated public profile since 2017 was substantial funding and assistance with media and networking from US tech billionaire Robert Shillman, the Middle East Forum, the David Horowitz Freedom Centre and the Gatestone Institute. All four sources combine advocacy for Israel with encouragement for viewpoints and political movements in conflict with Muslims in Europe or North America.

=== Unite the Kingdom rallies ===
On 13 September 2025, in central London, over 110,000 people gathered in a 'Unite the Kingdom' rally organised by Robinson. A 5,000-strong counter-protest by anti-racism campaigners also took place. Violence at the rally saw 26 police officers injured, and 24 people arrested, after protesters threw bottles and other projectiles. Also in September 2025, British singer and songwriter Labi Siffre issued a cease and desist order against Robinson, over his use of his song "(Something Inside) So Strong" at the rally, saying: "Anybody who knows me... will know the joke of them using the work of a positive atheist, homosexual black artist as apparently representative of their movement."

On 13 December 2025, Robinson, who was reported to have converted to Christianity while in prison, organised a 'Unite the Kingdom' Christmas service attended by around 1,000 people.

On 16 May 2026, Robinson organised a second 'Unite the Kingdom' rally in central London, which attracted a smaller attendance (police estimated around 60,000) than in September 2025. Robinson told supporters to prepare for a "battle of Britain", encouraging them to move beyond street protest and get involved in local politics before the next general election. The UK government had earlier blocked 11 overseas far-right activists – including Valentina Gomez, Eva Vlaardingerbroek and Dominik Tarczyński – from entering the UK to attend the rally.

=== Channel 4 documentary ===
On 9 September 2026, Channel 4 aired a 65-minute Dispatches documentary about Robinson, titled Tommy Robinson: Where's the Money Gone?. Presented by journalist Matt Shea, the programme investigated Robinson's use of donations by supporters and what appeared to be tax evasion efforts involving limited companies registered to Robinson and his former wife Jenna Vowles. Shea discovered Robinson held an active UK bank account, despite having publicly claimed that he had been debanked. On the same day, Robinson released a 100-minute video as a rebuttal to Shea's findings.

== Involvement in electoral politics ==
Robinson joined the far-right and fascist British National Party (BNP), then led by Nick Griffin, in 2004. When questioned about this by the journalist Andrew Neil in June 2013, he said that he had left after one year because he did not know Griffin was in the National Front or that non-whites could not join the organisation: "I joined, I saw what it was about, it was not for me." He was involved with the group United Peoples of Luton, formed in response to a March 2009 protest against Royal Anglian Regiment troops returning from the Afghan War being attacked by the Islamist groups Al-Muhajiroun and Ahlus Sunnah wal Jamaah.

In September 2018, Robinson expressed a desire to join the UK Independence Party (UKIP). On 23 November 2018 UKIP leader Gerard Batten appointed Robinson as his own advisor. In response, the former UKIP leader Nigel Farage described Robinson as a "thug" and said he was heartbroken with the direction UKIP was going. Farage and a Senedd member called for Batten to be removed as leader. At a UKIP meeting on 30 November, Robinson sat with Daniel Thomas, a convicted kidnapper.

Many prominent UKIP members, including eight of its members of the European Parliament, resigned from the party in response to Robinson's appointment. Of the eight MEPs who left, two were former party leaders. One was UKIP's leader in Scotland; and another was Farage, who said Robinson and his associates brought "scuffles" and "violence" into the party and "many have criminal records, some pretty serious".

UKIP's rules deny membership to those who have been part of extreme right-wing groups in the past: these preclude Robinson from joining, as he founded the English Defence League (EDL), had been a member of the British National Party, and has had ties with the British Freedom Party. UKIP's National Executive Committee considered waiving that clause for Robinson as a special case. If approved, his possible membership would be put to a vote at the party's conference. Batten supported Robinson joining the party, while the UKIP Senedd members Michelle Brown and David Rowlands said they opposed it.

On 25 April 2019, Robinson announced that he would be an independent candidate at the 2019 European Parliament election in North West England. It was reported that Anne Marie Waters, leader of the far-right For Britain party, promised Robinson the support of her party. Two people were hospitalised when Robinson campaigned as an MEP candidate in Warrington, Cheshire on 2 May. His security team and supporters physically attacked anti-racism activists, with one anti-racism activist saying she suffered a broken nose. Police launched an investigation into the violence. Robinson finished eighth in the election with 38,908 votes (2.2 per cent), widely described as "humiliating" in the media, and losing his deposit. He said he had faced a "near impossible task" in attempting to win a seat, as he was "unable to get across his message on social media platforms" after being banned by almost all such platforms. His reaction was to mock the idea of a People's Vote by joking about having another election.

Before the 2019 United Kingdom general election, Robinson endorsed Conservative Party leader Boris Johnson as prime minister. Following the election he announced he had joined the party. However, this was denied by a Conservative MP, Johnny Mercer, and by the Conservative Party nationally. Scram:, a website that campaigns against Robinson and other figures it sees as promoting far-right politics, has also debunked the claim.

In March 2022, Robinson began to endorse For Britain, and encouraged his supporters to join the party to "build a political force".

On 3 August 2025, Robinson posted a video on his X account, announcing that he had joined Advance UK. The party was set up by Ben Habib, who had previously been a co-deputy leader of Reform UK.

On 30 January 2026, Robinson endorsed Reform's Matt Goodwin for the 2026 Gorton and Denton by-election. A Reform spokesperson said that the party has been "consistently clear ... [that] he isn't welcome", while Farage stated that Robinson "can do what the hell he likes ... I don't think it really matters frankly." Goodwin refused to welcome the endorsement.

== Criminal charges and convictions ==
Robinson's criminal record includes convictions for violence, financial, and immigration frauds, possession of drugs, and public order offences. He has previously served at least three separate custodial sentences: in 2005 for assault, in 2012 for using false travel documents, and in 2014 for mortgage fraud.

=== 2005 and 2011 convictions for assaults ===
In April 2005, at Luton Crown Court, Robinson was convicted of assault occasioning actual bodily harm and assault with intent to resist arrest against an off-duty police constable in July 2004. The officer had intervened in an argument in the street between Robinson and his then girlfriend, Jenna Vowles. In the struggle that followed, Robinson kicked the officer in the head as he lay on the ground. Robinson received two concurrent sentences of 12 months and 3 months.

In September 2011, at Preston Magistrates' Court, Robinson was convicted of assault for headbutting a man in Blackburn on 2 April 2011. In November 2011 he was given a 12-week jail term, suspended for 12 months.

=== 2011 conviction for public order offence ===
In July 2011, at Luton and South Bedfordshire Magistrates' Court, Robinson was convicted of using threatening, abusive or insulting behaviour, for leading a group of Luton Town F.C. supporters into a brawl involving 100 people in Luton on 24 August 2010. He was sentenced to a 12-month community rehabilitation order, 150 hours of unpaid work, and given a three-year football banning order.

=== 2012 conviction for use of false passport ===
In October 2012, Robinson was arrested and held on the charge of having entered the United States illegally. In September 2012, he had used a passport in the name of Andrew McMaster to board a Virgin Atlantic flight from London Heathrow to New York City, as he had been banned from entering the US because of his criminal record. Upon arriving at John F. Kennedy International Airport, US Customs and Border Protection officials took his fingerprints, and discovered he was not McMaster. After being asked to attend a second interview, he left the airport, entering the US illegally in the process. He stayed one night, and returned to the UK the following day using his own passport.

Robinson pleaded guilty at Southwark Crown Court for using a passport that did not belong to him. He was subsequently sentenced in January 2013 to 10 months' imprisonment. Judge Alistair McCreath told him: "What you did went absolutely to the heart of the immigration controls that the United States are entitled to have. It's not in any sense trivial." He was released on an electronic tag on 22 February 2013.

Through his mother, an Irish immigrant to Britain, Robinson reportedly qualifies for an Irish passport as Stephen Yaxley-Lennon. In August 2024, three Irish Teachtaí Dála asked the Irish government to investigate the validity of his Irish passport, after it emerged he had given his place of birth as "Ireland".

=== 2012 conviction for mortgage fraud ===
In November 2012 Robinson was charged with three counts of conspiracy to commit fraud by misrepresentation in relation to a mortgage application, along with five other defendants. He pleaded guilty to two charges and in January 2014 was sentenced to 18 months of imprisonment. Robinson's fraud amounted to £160,000 over a period of 6 months. Judge Andrew Bright described him as the "instigator, if not the architect" of a series of frauds totalling £640,000. "This was an operation which was fraudulent from the outset and involved a significant amount of forward planning." He described Robinson as a "fixer" who had introduced others to the fraudulent mortgage broker Deborah Rothschild. Rothschild had assisted some defendants by providing fake pay slips and income details.

Robinson was attacked by several fellow prisoners in HM Prison Woodhill. Following news of the attack, Maajid Nawaz wrote to the Secretary of State for Justice, Chris Grayling, asking for Robinson's situation to be urgently addressed. Shortly after this incident, Robinson was moved to HM Prison Winchester. Robinson told Jamie Bartlett, a director of the think tank Demos: "In Woodhill, I experienced Islam the gang. ... In Winchester, I have experienced Islam the religion." Robinson made friends with several Muslim prisoners, referring to them as "great lads ... I cannot speak highly enough of the Muslim inmates I'm now living with". In June 2014 Robinson was released on licence. The terms of his early release included having no contact with the EDL until the end of his original sentence in June 2015. He was due to talk to the Oxford Union in October 2014, but was recalled to prison before the event for breaching the terms of his licence. He was ultimately released on 14 November 2014.

=== Stalking and harassment of journalists ===
==== 2021 conviction for harassment and banning order ====
Sometime after 10 pm on 17 January 2021, Robinson went to the home of the journalist Lizzie Dearden after she had asked for his comment for a story she was writing about allegations that he had misused financial donations from his supporters. He falsely accused her partner of being a paedophile and threatened to return every night. He was arrested over the incident, and further published photographs of Dearden's partner on his Telegram channel, stating that "serious allegations" had been made about the partner. It was alleged he threatened the couple in an attempt to prevent the article from being published. Dearden's article was published on 18 March 2021. On 19 March Robinson was issued with an interim stalking ban order. On 13 October 2021, Robinson was convicted at Westminster Magistrates' Court of stalking the couple, and was given a five-year ban from contacting them or referring to them. On 19 October 2023 he lost his appeal against the stalking ban order, having admitted that the allegations he made about Dearden's partner were false.

==== 2025 conviction for harassment ====
On 21 May 2025, Robinson was charged with harassment causing fear of violence against two Daily Mail journalists in August 2024 who, while he was on holiday with his family, had accused him of "stoking riots from his sunbed", ultimately causing him and his family to leave the hotel following telephone calls with security. He appeared at Westminster Magistrates' Court on 5 June 2025, when he elected for a trial by jury and was released on bail ahead of a pre-trial hearing at Southwark Crown Court on 3 July 2025. At the hearing, Robinson entered not guilty pleas. The trial started on 19 October 2026. The court heard that Robinson had shared pictures of a journalist's family online and had threatened to visit his home, and that he used "bully-boy, intimidatory tactics" to terrorise the journalists. On 28 October 2026, the jury found Robinson guilty of two counts of harassment causing fear of violence. He was granted bail ahead of sentencing scheduled for 16 December 2026.

=== 2024 prosecution and acquittal for failure to open mobile phone to police ===
On 13 November 2024, Robinson appeared in court charged with a terror-related offence after refusing to provide his mobile phone login PIN when requested by police in Folkestone on 28 July 2024. A trial, initially expected in March 2025, opened on 13 October 2025; after a two-day hearing closed on 14 October, a judgement announced on 4 November 2025 cleared Robinson of the offence. The judge ruled that Robinson was stopped unlawfully as, rather than on suspicion of a connection to terrorism, the stop was based on what the far-right activist "stood for" and his beliefs.

== Contempt of court in grooming gang cases ==
=== 2017 conviction ===
On 10 May 2017, Robinson was charged with contempt of court, and convicted. He had filmed inside Canterbury Crown Court and posted prejudicial statements calling the defendants "Muslim child rapists" while the jury was deliberating. Judge Heather Norton said Robinson used "pejorative language in his broadcast which prejudged the outcome of the case and could have had the effect of substantially derailing the trial." She added, "this is not about free speech, not about the freedom of the press, nor about legitimate journalism, and not about political correctness. It is about justice and ensuring that a trial can be carried out justly and fairly, it's about being innocent until proven guilty. It is about preserving the integrity of the jury to continue without people being intimidated or being affected by irresponsible and inaccurate 'reporting', if that's what it was."

The court later wrongly stated that Robinson had been sentenced to three months of imprisonment, suspended for 18 months, a technically incorrect result recorded by the court and reported in the press. In law, he had been committed to prison for contempt rather than criminally sentenced, a technical error eventually corrected by the Court of Appeal.

The ramifications of this technical error came into effect in 2018 when the suspended prison sentence was activated. Robinson was again found to be in contempt of court at Leeds, again wrongly given a sentence of imprisonment and the Canterbury suspended sentence activated. Both sentences were for the offence of contempt of court, which can include speeches or publications that create a "substantial risk that the course of justice in the proceedings in question will be seriously impeded or prejudiced". He was later released following a successful challenge to the court's sentencing procedure, and a rehearing was ordered.

=== 2018 imprisonment ===
Robinson was jailed and later released in mid-2018 for imperilling the course of justice in the Huddersfield sex abuse ring trial. On 25 May 2018, Robinson was arrested for a breach of the peace while live streaming outside Leeds Crown Court, during the trial of the Huddersfield grooming gang on which reporting restrictions had been ordered by the judge. Following Robinson's arrest Judge Geoffrey Marson QC issued a further reporting restriction on Robinson's case, prohibiting any reporting of Robinson's case or the grooming trial until the latter case was complete.

The reporting restriction with regard to Robinson was lifted on 29 May 2018, following a challenge by journalists. The media reported that Robinson had admitted contempt of court by publishing information that could prejudice an ongoing trial, and had been jailed for 13 months. Judge Marson sentenced Robinson to ten months for contempt of court and his previous three months' suspended sentence was activated because of the breach. Robinson's lawyer said that Robinson felt "deep regret" after comprehending the potential consequences of his behaviour. Having breached a temporary section 4 (2) order under the Contempt of Court Act 1981, Robinson was told that if a retrial had to be held as a result of his actions the cost could be "hundreds and hundreds of thousands of pounds". Dominic Casciani, the BBC's home affairs correspondent, said, "This is not some new form of censorship directed at Robinson. These are rules that apply to us all, equally. If he is unsure about that, he's now got time on his hands to read a copy of Essential Law for Journalists."

==== Response of supporters ====
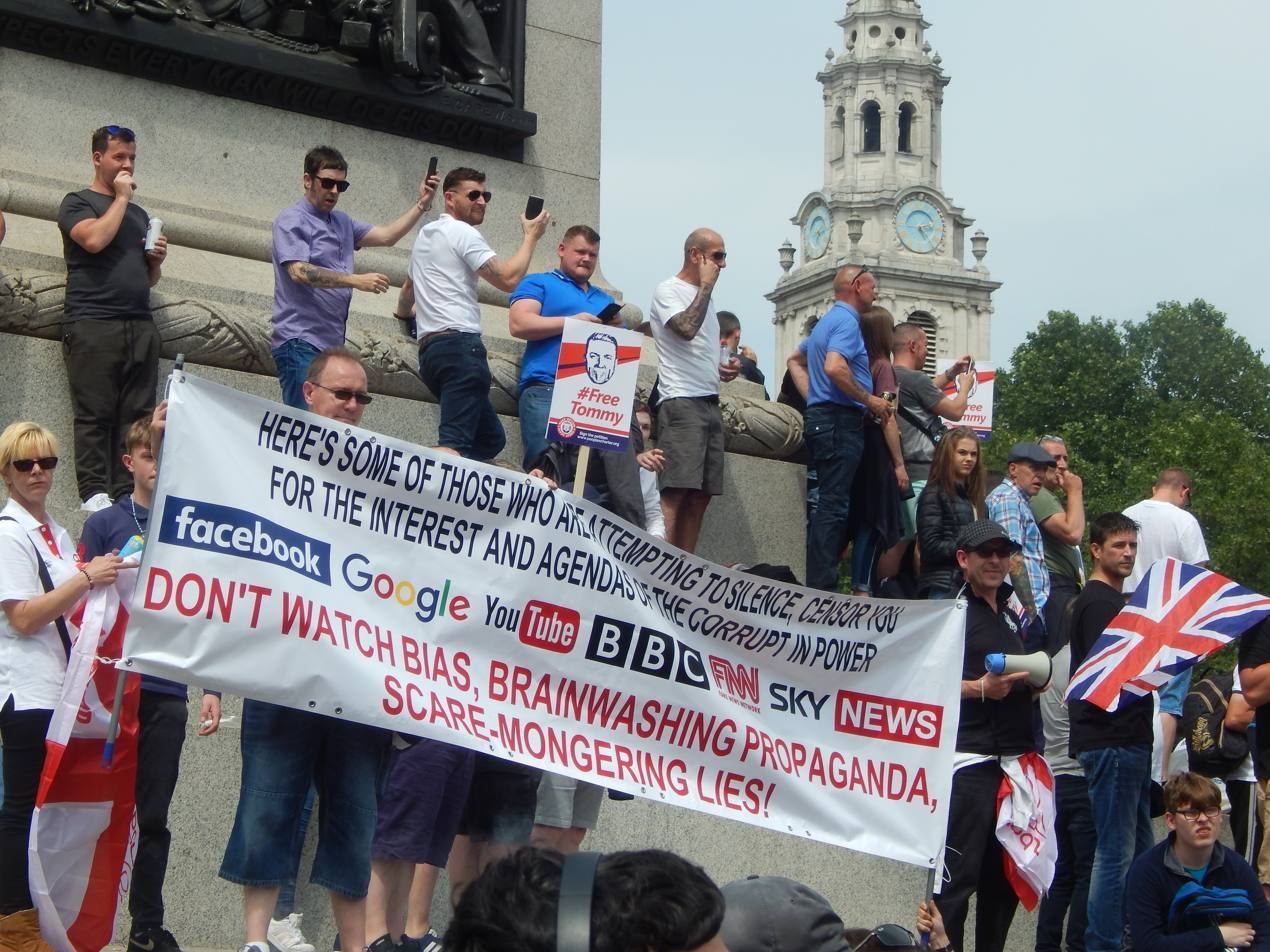
Protests for the release of Robinson at Trafalgar Square on 9 June 2018

The jailing of Robinson drew condemnation from right-wing circles. The UK Independence Party leader Gerard Batten MEP expressed concern about the proceedings and the ban on reporting. Robinson attracted sympathy from several right-wing politicians in the Western world, including the Dutch Party for Freedom leader Geert Wilders and the member of the German Bundestag for the far-right Alternative for Germany (AfD) Petr Bystron.

On the weekends following Robinson's arrest, his supporters held rallies to show support. At a demonstration in London on 9 June, over 10,000 protesters blocked the roads around Trafalgar Square and some attacked police, injuring five officers. Some demonstrators prevented a Muslim woman from driving a bus, performed Nazi salutes, threw scaffolding, glass bottles, and street furniture at police, and damaged vehicles and buildings. An online petition for his release had more than 500,000 signatures. Hope not Hate, an anti-fascist advocacy group, said its analysis showed that 68.1 per cent of the signatures were from the UK, 9.7 per cent from Australia, 9.3 per cent from the United States, and the rest from Canada, Germany, France, New Zealand, Netherlands, Sweden and Ireland combined.

In mid-June, Robinson was transferred from HM Prison Hull to HM Prison Onley, the prison with the highest Muslim population (30.4 per cent) in the Midlands. Caolan Robertson, then Robinson's cameraman, substantially exaggerated the Muslim population of the prison, telling the American conspiracy theorist Alex Jones that Robinson's new prison was "about 71 per cent Muslim" and therefore "really, really, really disastrous". The former Breitbart editor Raheem Kassam shared it to his followers on Twitter while falsely accusing the Home Secretary, Sajid Javid, of moving Robinson there. A Robinson supporter was subsequently jailed for posting threatening and abusive messages aimed at Javid, relating to Robinson. In July 2018, Reuters reported that the United States Ambassador-at-Large for International Religious Freedom, Sam Brownback, lobbied the UK government on the treatment of Robinson. The Middle East Forum has also lobbied the United States government and provided financial aid for rallies and legal aid. The Middle East Forum donated US$50,000 to his legal defence fund.

==== Appeal hearing ====
Robinson lodged an appeal initially against the proceedings at Leeds, but much later against convictions both at Canterbury and Leeds. The Court of Appeal agreed to hear Robinson's appeal out of time because Robinson had been held in "effective solitary confinement", which had made it difficult for him to have meetings with his lawyers. The matter came before the Lord Chief Justice and two others at the Court of Appeal on 18 July 2018. Robinson said that he had not admitted the charges at Leeds nor had he been given a chance to apologise. His lawyer said that his initial contempt hearing was flawed; the details of the charge were not clear. He argued that his sentence was unfair. The court issued its ruling on 1 August 2018. In effect, the appeal against the Canterbury proceedings failed and that against the Leeds proceedings succeeded.

The court analysed the differences that arise from a prison sentence for a criminal offence and those from committal to prison for contempt. Of the mistakes made at Canterbury, the Court of Appeal learnt that those representing Robinson had been aware of the procedural errors. "It lies ill in the mouth of an appellant to complain of the failure of the court below to follow the appropriate procedural steps when that failure was fully appreciated at the time and remained deliberately uncorrected for tactical reasons and collateral advantage." In respect of the Leeds contempt the court stated, "We are satisfied that the decision at Leeds Crown Court to proceed to committal to prison so promptly and without due regard for Part 48 of the Rules gave rise to unfairness. There was no clarity about what parts of the video were relied upon as amounting to contempt, what parts the appellant accepted through his counsel amounted to contempt and for what conduct he was sentenced." It was ordered that the records of the Crown Court at Canterbury and at Leeds were to be amended to show that Robinson had been committed to prison for contempt of court, not sentenced to imprisonment. It was ordered the matter was to be reheard at the Old Bailey before the Recorder of London "as soon as reasonably possible." Robinson was released on bail.

==== Aftermath of imprisonment ====
On 2 August 2018 Robinson was interviewed on Tucker Carlson Tonight. He mainly discussed his two months in prison. He said that he was initially put in HM Prison Hull, where he was treated well. He was then transferred to HM Prison Onley, where, he claimed, he was severely mistreated, including with 'solitary confinement'. HM Prison Service rejected his claims, saying, "Mr Yaxley-Lennon [Robinson] was treated with the same fairness we aim to show all prisoners – he had access to visits, television, and showers – and it is totally false to say he was held in 'solitary confinement'", adding that he had been kept in a care and separation unit for 48 hours while an assessment was made of his safety.

Reporting restrictions were lifted on the three Huddersfield grooming gang trials after the jury reached a verdict in the final trial. The Yorkshire Evening Post explained that it abided by the temporary restrictions because "If we had reported on the first trial then jurors may have been swayed in the second trial – a defence lawyer would argue that their clients could not get a fair hearing ... the whole trial could have collapsed ... a judge may have had to rule that they could not get a fair trial and those girls would NEVER have seen the men brought to justice".

In October 2018, the American Republican Party politician Paul Gosar and six other members of the US Congress invited Robinson to speak at a private meeting on 14 November 2018. The trip was to be sponsored by the Middle East Forum, which said it had provided Robinson with legal funds since his imprisonment. Robinson was not granted a visa for the trip.

==== New trial ====
Following court hearings on 27 September and 23 October 2018, the case was referred to the Attorney General, Geoffrey Cox QC. Judge Nicholas Hilliard said the matter was so complex it needed further consideration, adding "all the evidence must be rigorously tested". The referral would allow witnesses to be cross-examined.

In March 2019, the attorney general decided that it was in the public interest to bring further proceedings against Robinson. A contempt conviction had been quashed by the Court of Appeal in August 2018 "over procedural failings", and Robinson had been freed on bail pending new proceedings at the Old Bailey. But Nicholas Hilliard, the Recorder of London, had referred the case to the attorney general in October 2018 for further investigation. After further studies for five months, Cox decided to raise further proceedings against Robinson, concluding that "there are strong grounds to bring fresh contempt of court proceedings against Stephen Yaxley-Lennon." He added, "As proceedings are now underway, it would not be appropriate to comment further and I remind everyone that it is an offence to comment on live court cases." The first hearing in this renewed case was due to take place at the High Court in London on 22 March 2019. Robinson reacted by alleging that this new procedure by the attorney general was part of "an ongoing state persecution of a journalist [Robinson], who exposes the [UK] government and establishment and all of their wrongs."

On 5 July 2019, Robinson was again found guilty of contempt of court at the retrial on three different grounds, including breaching the reporting restriction. Within days of his video livestreaming from the Huddersfield trial, defence lawyers had applied for the jury to be discharged on the basis of having been prejudiced, which could have collapsed the trial, arguing:

It is inconceivable when you have 3.5 million hits on the internet that this information has not come to the attention of this jury. It is inconceivable that the jury have not been spoken to by others, whether they themselves were looking for the information matters or not.

Three days before his scheduled sentencing on 11 July, Robinson appeared on The Alex Jones Show on the right-wing conspiracy channel InfoWars to appeal for political asylum in the United States, saying:

I feel like I'm two days away from being sentenced to death in the U.K. for journalism. Today, I am calling on the help of Donald Trump, his administration and the Republican Party to grant me and my family political asylum in the United States of America. ... I beg Donald Trump, I beg the American government, to look at my case. I need evacuation from this country because dark forces are at work. ... This is a direct appeal on behalf of my family – we love the United States, I have no future here [in Britain]. The country has fallen.

US President Trump's ambassador for international religious freedom, former Senator Sam Brownback, raised the issue of Robinson's imprisonment with the British government in 2018, and Trump's son Donald Trump Jr. tweeted in support of Robinson. On 11 July 2019, Robinson was jailed for nine months at the Old Bailey. He described the sentence as an "absolute joke" and called for protests. Outside the court, some of his supporters booed and a crowd marched toward the building chanting "we want Tommy out"; some began pelting police with bottles and cans. Robinson had already served 69 days and would be required to serve about another ten weeks. On 13 September 2019, Robinson was released from prison after serving nine weeks. Several days later, he said that he had spoken to Julian Assange in prison, and announced that he supported him.

== Libel of Syrian refugee ==
After a Syrian refugee boy was assaulted in a school bullying incident in October 2018, Robinson falsely accused the victim of having previously attacked two schoolgirls. The 15-year-old refugee was dragged to the floor by his neck and told by his attacker, "I'll drown you," while water was forced into his mouth. The boy's arm was in a cast after it had been broken in a separate assault. His sister had also been assaulted.

A 16-year-old boy, believed to be the attacker, who was interviewed by police and given a court summons, had shared numerous social media posts by Robinson. On Facebook, Robinson subsequently posted a screenshot of a message from a mother saying her daughter had been bullied and he accused the refugee of being the bully. However, the mother responded on Robinson's Facebook page informing him this was false. Robinson also made a false allegation using a photo stolen from a news article on a teenage cancer patient.

These events forced the refugee's family to relocate because "the level of abuse the children have received has become too much". The family decided to move elsewhere in West Yorkshire. Robinson may have breached court orders preventing the naming of the alleged perpetrator in several videos on Facebook and Instagram, including one that was viewed more than 150,000 times. A lawyer said in doing so Robinson had "compounded" the refugee's suffering, adding "many people on social media having viewed Mr Yaxley-Lennon's [Robinson's] lies believed them and expressed their outrage toward [the refugee]."

In January 2019, the refugee said returning to Almondbury Community School was still too dangerous. He described living in fear after Robinson's postings because "there are people who hang around outside my house and video me on their phones. They call me 'little rat' if I go outside. One of my neighbours threatened me outside my house just yesterday." His lawyers said Robinson's postings had made him "the focus of countless messages of hate and threats from the extreme right wing" and had led to a police safety warning.

After receiving a letter from lawyers representing the refugee boy's family, pointing out that the videos Robinson had posted "contain a number of false and defamatory allegations", Robinson admitted to his followers that it was fake news and said that he had been duped: "I have been completely had, how embarrassing man." Robinson deleted the videos and admitted to posting a fake photograph purporting to show violence by a Muslim gang. He was warned about legal action for defamation. In response to allegations from Robinson's supporters that this warning "blocked" free speech, the boy's lawyer said "Tommy Robinson thinks it is a good idea to defame this 15-year-old boy and accuse him of being the author of his own bullying. It is actually sickening." On 15 May 2019, the boy's lawyer said that his client was suing Robinson for "defamatory comments" Robinson had made.

It was reported that Facebook protected prominent figures such as Robinson from the normal rules of moderation that would usually see a page removed after posting content that violates its rules. Solicitors representing the victim are pursuing legal action against the social media firm on the basis Facebook was responsible for Robinson's posts as it had given him "special treatment [that] seems to be financially driven". However, on 26 February 2019, Facebook announced that it had banned Robinson from the service for violating its community standards and "posting material that uses dehumanizing language and calls for violence targeted at Muslims". It also cited violations of policies concerning "organized hate".

On 22 July 2021, Robinson was found to have libelled the boy and was ordered to pay £100,000 plus legal costs, which were understood to amount to a further £500,000. An injunction was also granted to stop Robinson from repeating the libel. Robinson, who represented himself during the four-day trial, said he was "gobsmacked" by the costs the victim's lawyers were claiming, which he said included £70,000 for taking witness statements. He added: "I've not got any money. I'm bankrupt. I've struggled hugely with my own issues these last 12 months ... I ain't got it." In January 2022 an independent insolvency expert was appointed by Robinson's creditors (who, including the schoolboy and the boy's lawyers, were owed an estimated £1.5 million in legal costs) to find any assets or money that Robinson could be hiding.

=== Silenced ===
Robinson produced a film, Silenced, about the Almondbury Community School bullying incident. It was financed by InfoWars, the website owned by Alex Jones and known for publishing conspiracy theories and fake news, which filed for bankruptcy in 2024; a trailer for the first cut of the film was released on InfoWars in 2021. By 2023, Robinson had started working with MICE Media (a now-defunct media channel founded by Bryn Davis, an American technology entrepreneur, conspiracy theorist, and supporter of Donald Trump) to finalise a new version of Silenced. The MICE Media version of Silenced was launched on 1 April 2023 in Copenhagen, at an event hosted by the Danish People's Party and the Danish Free Press Society, organisations associated with racism and anti-Muslim hatred. Robinson was welcomed to the event by DPP leader Morten Messerschmidt, who has suggested Europe was on the brink of a racial civil war because of Muslim immigration.

In the film, Robinson repeats his defamatory claims about the boy. He depicts the incident and the resulting fallout as a "story about how the law is being manipulated and exploited by the far left and Islamists to destroy the lives of anyone who speaks out against the so-called progressive, so-called liberal narrative." Sam Doak of Logically Facts wrote that the film's release "invites potential legal jeopardy". On 1 January 2025, Twitter owner Elon Musk retweeted the full film, saying it was "Worth watching". The following day, Musk tweeted "Free Tommy Robinson!" and in another post he wrote: "Why is Tommy Robinson in a solitary confinement prison for telling the truth?" On 7 January 2025, Robinson released a podcast praising Musk and stating that Musk was protecting freedom of speech. HM Prison Service began investigating how Robinson recorded and released a podcast from his prison cell.

=== 2024 arrest and imprisonment ===
On 28 July 2024, Robinson was arrested by Kent Police at the Channel Tunnel in Folkestone under the Terrorism Act 2000, "for frustration of a schedule 7 examination" immediately after his Unite the Kingdom protest at Trafalgar Square. He was released on bail. At the Trafalgar Square protest, he allegedly screened his film Silenced, despite a High Court order. He had been scheduled to attend a High Court contempt of court hearing on 29 July for making the film. An arrest warrant was issued after he left the country, to be enacted in October should he fail to appear at a follow-up hearing.

Ahead of that hearing on 28 October 2024 at Woolwich Crown Court, Robinson was held in custody after handing himself in to Folkestone police station on 25 October. At the hearing, Robinson admitted contempt of court by repeating false allegations about the Syrian refugee. He was sentenced to 18 months in prison and issued with a costs order for £80,350.82; the judge later ordered Robinson to pay £50,000 by 4pm on 7 January 2025. Robinson was described by his barrister as "a journalist". Judge Jeremy Johnson said that Robinson had shown no remorse and there was no realistic prospect of rehabilitation, adding: "All of his actions so far suggest that he regards himself as above the law."

Robinson was initially held at HM Prison Belmarsh. He was relocated after the jail received numerous abusive and racist emails, including threats directed at the governor, who is a black woman. On 1 November 2024, Robinson entered a closed wing at HM Prison Woodhill to protect him from attacks by other prisoners.

==== Challenging prison segregation ====
In March 2025, Robinson challenged the Ministry of Justice's decision to segregate him from other prisoners at HM Prison Woodhill. Robinson told the High Court that he was "terrified of the long-term consequences of the continued solitary confinement". The Ministry said Robinson had been segregated after it received multiple intelligence reports indicating that two other prisoners were plotting to assault Robinson. The Ministry feared that Robinson would "be killed by a lifer" if he remained on a wing. The Ministry also said Robinson's isolation was "substantially more permissive" than ordinary segregation arrangements: Robinson had access to a laptop and email, use of a gym facilities for three hours a day, and the ability to make social phone calls for four hours each day. It also revealed that, since November 2024, Robinson had made more than 1,250 social telephone calls, had sent hundreds of emails, and had had more than 90 visits approved, more than any other inmate.

On 21 March 2025, Mr Justice Chamberlain dismissed Robinson's claim, stating that Robinson's own barrister had acknowledged that there was no evidence he had been segregated "for the purpose of breaking his resistance or humiliating or debasing him". Chamberlain found that the decision had been taken "for [Robinson's] own protection and in the interests of preserving the safety of other prisoners and staff".

==== Appeal against contempt of court sentence ====
In April 2025, Robinson lost an appeal against his 18-month prison sentence for contempt of court. The Court of Appeal dismissed arguments about the impact of his prison segregation on his mental health, ruling there was "no reasonable basis" to reduce the sentence. He was expected to be released on licence in July 2025. However, in May 2025, the High Court reduced his sentence by four months on the basis that he had given an assurance that he would comply with the injunction in future. As a result, he was released from HM Prison Woodhill in Milton Keynes on 27 May 2025.

== Social media bans and reinstatement on X ==
In March 2018, Robinson was permanently banned from Twitter for violating its rules on "hateful conduct". In January 2019 YouTube announced that it had removed adverts from Robinson's account, saying that he had breached the site's guidelines. In February 2019, Facebook and Instagram banned him from their platforms, citing violations of their hate-speech rules, including "calls for violence targeted at Muslims". Facebook subsequently placed him on its list of "Dangerous Individuals".

In April 2019, YouTube restricted Robinson's account because of its "borderline content", placing its content "behind an interstitial [warning page], removed from recommendations, and stripped of key features including livestreaming, comments, suggested videos, and likes". In the same month, Snapchat terminated Robinson's account for violating their community guidelines, which prohibit hate speech and harassment. In April 2020, Robinson was banned from TikTok for sharing content that "promote[s] hateful ideology". Robinson had shared a clip of himself holding the Quran and saying, "This book is the reason we are in such a mess." Following the ban, Robinson joined VK, a Russian social media platform.

On 5 November 2023, Robinson's Twitter account was reinstated following the acquisition of Twitter by Elon Musk in November 2022. On 13 August 2024, the 30-year anniversary of the murder of Richard Everitt, Robinson stated on X that three defendants charged with the crime, Miah, Akbar and Hai, had been 'convicted' of the killing. Hai had in fact been acquitted. He wrote to Robinson stating this, and reported the post. On 16 August the tweet disappeared, but Robinson then made another post, copying the original screen, which he explained he had deleted to avoid having his X account suspended while he appealed the matter. Hai's lawyers Mishcon de Reya reported the second post, and then sent a letter before claim to X on 28 August. The post was removed on 6 September, within the deadline set by the lawyers. Hai, however, argues that X had not done enough to uphold its own policies, and the solicitors said the Online Safety Act 2023 had the potential to reduce such harmful online content. On 2 January 2025, the owner of X, Musk, pinned the message "Free Tommy Robinson" to the top of his own X-feed.

== Financial support ==
In 2017, the American billionaire businessman Robert J. Shillman funded Robinson's fellowship at the right-wing Canadian website Rebel News, with Robinson receiving over US$6,000 (£5,000) per month. Steve Bannon and Sam Brownback, a US State Department official, also voiced US support for Robinson, as did Raheem Kassam (a one-time Farage advisor and London editor of Breitbart News) who helped to raise money for Robinson in the US.

In 2018, Robinson received £2 million in donations solicited by opponents of his imprisonment. That same year, the Middle East Forum think tank (led by Daniel Pipes and with Kassam as a member, described as "fomenting anti-Muslim sentiment") said it had been funding rallies in Robinson's support and paying legal costs of his appeal against his prison sentence. The MEF spent $60,000 (£47,000) on Robinson's legal fees and on London demonstrations staged in 2018, and flew Republican Congressman Paul Gosar to London to speak at one of the rallies.

Robinson also received funding from the right-wing Yellow Vest Australia group. For several months in late 2018, he used Facebook's donations feature, intended for charitiable contributions, to fund a new conspiracy theory website and legal action against the British government for his treatment in prison. Facebook removed the button from Robinson's page. In November 2018 PayPal told Robinson that it would no longer process payments on his behalf, which he described as "fascism". The service said it cannot "be used to promote hate, violence, or other forms of intolerance that is [sic] discriminatory". Robinson has also received support from some far-right pro-Israel organisations, but has been criticised by Jewish civil rights organisation the Anti-Defamation League. It was reported in 2021 that Robinson had received over £2 million in donations and sponsorship.

== Bankruptcy ==
Before incurring an estimated £1.6 million in costs following the libel trial, Robinson filed for bankruptcy in March 2021, using the name Stephen Christopher Lennon. The official receiver was searching for concealed assets, including any which had been put into other people's names. Former employees have raised questions as to what happened to money raised to support him. He denies misusing funds. In January 2022, people owed money by Robinson (including the libelled schoolboy, the boy's lawyers, HM Revenue and Customs, a former business partner and the Borough of Barrow-in-Furness) appointed an independent insolvency expert in an attempt to recover their money before the deadline for claims in March 2022.

In June 2022, at the High Court in London, Robinson said that he spent £100,000 on gambling, stating he had suffered a "total mental breakdown", before declaring bankruptcy. He also said he owed an estimated £160,000 to HMRC. On 1 August 2022 Robinson was fined £900 for failing to appear at the High Court to answer questions over his finances; he was also ordered to pay £20,000 in costs.

== Tax investigation ==
In August 2024, The Times reported Robinson owed in the region of £2 million to his creditors, and said he and associates had created "a web of secretive companies" which made profits of over £1.6 million without paying tax. Over six years, directors of these entities failed to file any annual accounts, with one of the companies (Hope and Pride Ltd) owing £328,000 in corporation tax and employer contributions to HMRC. Robinson was the subject of an HMRC tax investigation and was reported to have discussed becoming "non-resident" for tax purposes. In the late 2010s, Robinson registered five companies under two different names (Paul Harris and Stephen Lennon). The Good Law Project said in 2024 that this potentially broke the law.

== Personal life ==
Robinson married Jenna Vowles in 2011 after about 10 years together; they have three children together. They divorced in February 2021.

In 2010, he owned a tanning salon in Luton.
