= Mo Ansar =

British political and social commentator

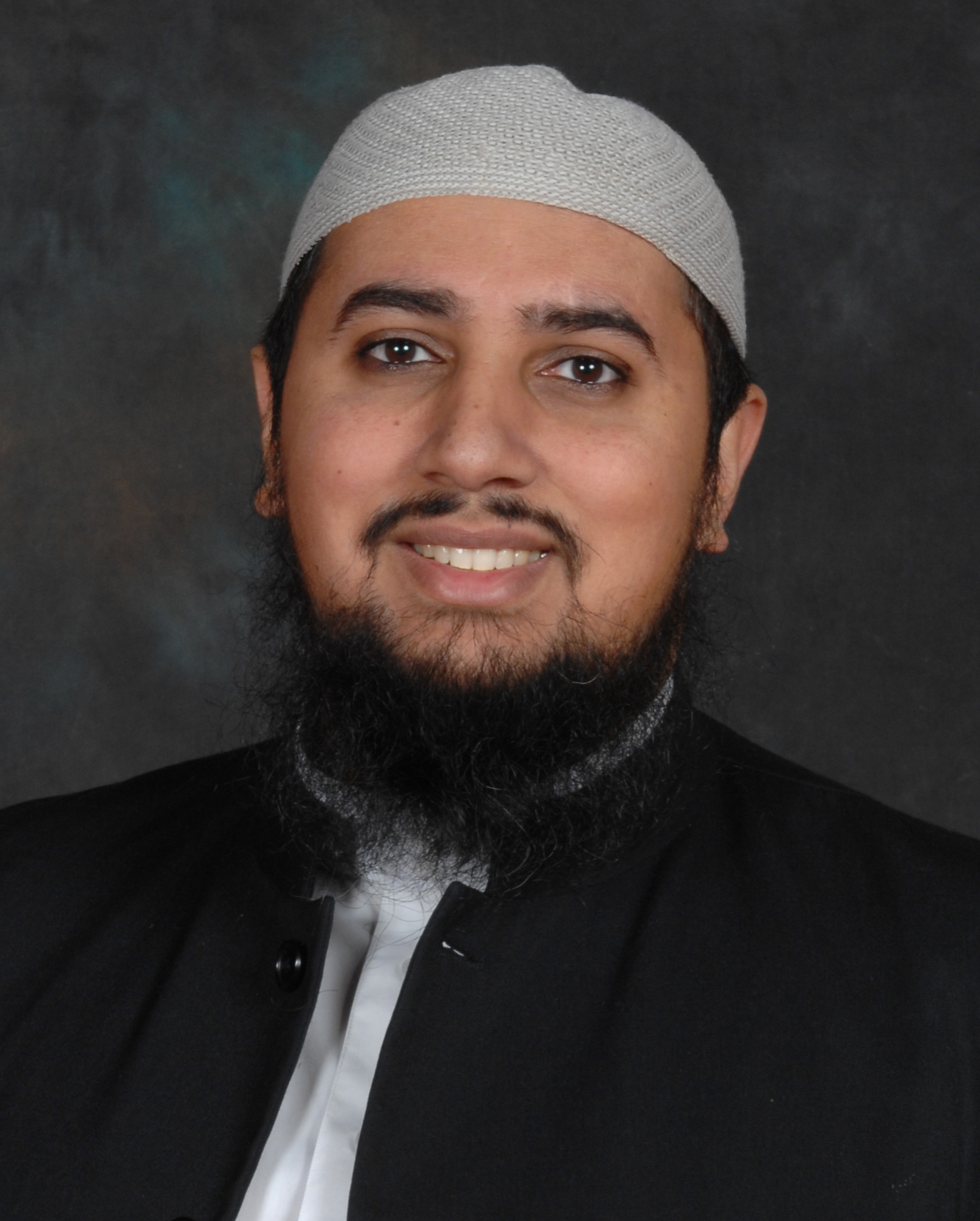
- Ansar in 2009
- Born: 6 April 1974 (age 52); Watford, England
- Occupations: Political and social commentator

Mohammed "Mo" Ansar (Arabic: محمد انصار, born 6 April 1974) is a British-Pakistani political and social commentator.

== Life and career ==
Ansar was an employee of Lloyds Banking Group, until he was suspended in 2003 for unsatisfactory work and falsification of assets. Ansar then sued the bank for racial discrimination, but the tribunal concluded that he had not been discriminated against and his problems had resulted from his own unwillingness to listen to guidance from his female managers.

In 2010, whilst chair of the Hampshire Independent Equality Forum (HIEF) Steering Group, Ansar coordinated the Southampton Flood Relief Campaign for victims of the 2010 Pakistan Floods and participated in a Question Time-style event in a Hampshire school.

In March 2012, Ansar appeared at Cambridge Science Festival on a panel convened by comedian and Guest Director Robin Ince on "whether religion and science can coexist in harmony".

In August 2013, Ansar gave a talk at the Greenbelt Festival called What have the Muslims ever done for us?. In October 2013, Ansar gave an interfaith talk entitled Facing Secularism Together for the annual Lovell (Interfaith) Lecture at Winchester Cathedral.

In November 2015, Ansar led the Southampton University Students Union Islamic Society event Open Muslim Prayers as part of the annual Inter Faith Week "organised by the University of Southampton's Chaplaincy and the Parkes Institute to promote diversity, celebration, and understanding".

== Media work and journalism ==
In April 2012, Ansar met then English Defence League leader Tommy Robinson when both men participated in the BBC programme The Big Questions. At Ansar's invitation, they began a dialogue about their opposing views which became the subject of a BBC documentary – When Tommy Met Mo. During the documentary, Ansar came under much pressure when challenged on certain moral values and theological principles by Maajid Nawaz of the Quilliam think tank. At the end of the documentary, Robinson left the EDL and began to work with Quilliam, which he later cited as helping facilitate his exit.

Ansar wrote an article for The Guardian which was published shortly before the BBC documentary Quitting the English Defence League: When Tommy Met Mo aired.

In December 2012, Ansar was invited to participate in a discussion with Rabbi Laura Janner-Klausner and Giles Fraser for an article in the Christmas Issue guest co-edited by Robin Ince New Statesman.

== Criticism ==
On 29 October 2013, as part of the follow-up to the broadcast of the BBC documentary When Tommy Met Mo, Ansar was questioned on the BBC politics programme The Daily Politics about his Twitter debate with Tom Holland over slavery in antiquity, during which he had tweeted "If slaves are treated justly with no oppression whatsoever, who could possibly object, Tom". Douglas Murray accused Ansar of being unwilling "to admit that the Quran appears to permit the taking of sexual slaves".

In May 2014, Ansar was criticised by journalists including radio presenter, Iain Dale, journalist Nick Cohen, journalist Jamie Bartlett and author, Jeremy Duns regarding his views and his conduct. In May 2014, Cohen wrote a critical article about Ansar in The Spectator in which he questioned Ansar's professional credentials, reiterating Dale's view that Ansar had "invented himself as a rent-a-quote commentator" and said Ansar had a Twitter alias account that denigrated those he disagreed with. Bartlett wrote that Ansar's "language of tolerance and moderation" belied his stance on homophobia and amputation of limbs in Islamic states and that he had fabricated claims about his professional experience, including a false claim that he was a lawyer. Haras Rafiq, former director of CENTRI, a counter-extremism organisation, called Ansar a "Frankenstein's monster that's been created by the media" who "lies blatantly". Murray, of the Henry Jackson Society, described him as a "fraudulent faux-moderate" who "makes stuff up", referring to Ansar's claim that Muslims had been trading with Native Americans centuries before Christopher Columbus came to America.

After Ansar had fallen out with the leader of counter-extremism think tank, the Quilliam Foundation, Maajid Nawaz, Ansar became a vocal critic and has questioned their influence over UK government policy and strategy.

On 16 December 2015, the Portsmouth comic Joe Wells pulled his show at the New Theatre Royal, saying: "We had safety concerns and weren't able to provide security". Ansar had said it was "potentially unlawful for any of us to pull out when coerced to discriminate". Wells stood by his decision to pull the show. He said: "I wasn't aware of quite how controversial a panellist Mo would be. We're a silly, whimsical comedy show not equipped for serious controversy."

== Social and political views ==
Ansar considers Ahmadi Muslims as outside the religion of Islam.

=== Muslim civil rights ===
In February 2013, Ansar gave a talk to the Islamic Society of the University of York on Islam in Britain and the Muslim Civil Rights Crisis. Ansar opened his talk with the claim that Muslims from Africa had colonised the pre-Columbian Americas: "trading and intermarrying with Iroquois and Algonquin Indians". In his opinion article on "Islamophobia and the Muslim Civil Rights Crisis", Ansar claimed that there existed "a broader societal problem" and "tangible civil rights crisis for Muslim communities – not just within the UK, but throughout the Western world".

=== Counter-extremism ===
Ansar is reported as having worked with the British government on the counter-extremism PREVENT programme. He has subsequently become an ardent critic of both PREVENT and the government's counter-extremism policy.

==== Death threats ====
On 17 October 2013, several British Muslims, including Ansar, claimed that they were "warned that they could be targeted". On 18 October 2013, Channel 4 News reported that Al Shabaab denied having threatened the lives of any of the Muslims featured in the video and claimed instead that their aim was "to expose anyone who spoke out after the killing in Woolwich as not representative of the truth".

== See also ==
- List of British Pakistanis
