= Richard Billingham =

English photographer and artist (born 1970)

Richard Billingham (born 25 September 1970) is an English photographer and artist, film maker and art teacher. His work has mostly concerned his family, the place he grew up in the West Midlands, but also landscapes elsewhere.

Billingham is best known for the photobook Ray's a Laugh (1996), which documents the life of his alcoholic father Ray, and obese, heavily tattooed mother Liz. He has also published the collections Black Country (2003), Zoo (2007), and Landscapes, 2001–2003 (2008). He has made several short films, including Fishtank (1998) and Ray (2016). Billingham adapted the latter into his first feature film, Ray & Liz (2018), a memoir of his childhood.

He won the 1997 Citibank Private Bank Photography Prize (now Deutsche Börse Photography Prize) and was shortlisted for the 2001 Turner Prize. His work is held in the permanent collections of Tate, the Victoria and Albert Museum, and Government Art Collection in London.

Billingham lives in Swansea on the Gower Peninsula in South Wales and holds professorships at Middlesex University and the University of Gloucestershire.

== Career ==
Billingham was born in Birmingham and studied as a painter at Bournville College of Art and the University of Sunderland. He came to prominence through his candid photography of his family in Cradley Heath, a body of work later added to and published in the acclaimed book Ray's A Laugh (1996). The photos were originally intended as studies for paintings. However, a tutor at Sunderland University came across them in a plastic bag and encouraged Billingham to display them as is. Ray's a Laugh is a portrayal of the poverty and deprivation in which he grew up. Billingham chose to use the cheapest film and development he could find. Ray, his father, and his mother Liz, appear at first glance as grotesque figures, with the alcoholic father drunk on his home brew, and the mother, an obese chain smoker with an apparent fascination for nicknacks and jigsaw puzzles. However, there is such integrity in this work that Ray and Liz ultimately shine through as troubled yet deeply human and touching personalities. The critic Julian Stallabrass describes Ray and Liz as embodiments of "what is in legend a particularly British stoicism and resilience, in the face of the tempest of modernity."

In 1996, Billingham had an exhibition at the National Museum of Photography, Film and Television in Bradford, UK. In 1997, he was included in the exhibition Sensation at the Royal Academy of Art which showcased the art collection of Charles Saatchi and included many of the Young British Artists. Also in 1997, Billingham won the Citibank Private Bank Photography Prize (now Deutsche Börse Photography Prize). He was shortlisted for the 2001 Turner Prize, for his solo show at the Ikon Gallery in Birmingham, and others.

In 1998, Billingham made his first documentary video, Fishtank, a study of his father filmed with a handheld camera. It was commissioned by Artangel and Adam Curtis for BBC Television and shown on BBC Two in December 1998. Since 2011, Fishtank has been part of the Artangel Collection – 25 notable films available for loan, free of charge, to publicly funded UK museums and galleries.

He has also made landscape photographs at places of personal significance around the Black Country, and more of these were commissioned in 2003 by the arts organisation The Public, resulting in a book.

In late 2006, Billingham exhibited a major new series of photographs and videos inspired by his memories of visiting Dudley Zoo as a child. The series, entitled Zoo, was commissioned by Birmingham-based arts organisation Vivid and was exhibited at Compton Verney Art Gallery in Warwickshire. A book of the work was published the following year.

In the following year, he created a series of photographs of "Constable Country", the area on the Essex / Suffolk border painted by John Constable. These were exhibited at the Town Hall Galleries, Ipswich.

Billingham's work was included in the 2007 BBC television series The Genius of Photography, being the subject of part 3 of the "We Are Family" episode, made by Wall to Wall Media.

In 2009–2010, Billingham participated in a collective exhibition at the Kunstmuseum Wolfsburg, Germany titled: Ich, zweifellos.

Billingham wrote and directed his first feature film, Ray & Liz, in 2018. It is a memoir of his childhood and his parents, told in three separate time frames. Wendy Ide of The Guardian wrote: "It’s gruelling at times, but the film is extraordinary and unflinching. And remarkably, it’s made with as much love as anger."

As of 2019, he lives on the Gower Peninsular in South Wales with his wife and three kids. He holds professorships at the University of Gloucestershire and Middlesex University.

== Publications ==
=== Publications by Billingham ===
- Ray's a Laugh.
  - Ray's a Laugh. Zürich: Scalo, 1996. ISBN 9783931141257. Edited by Michael Collins and Julian Germain.
  - Ray is'n Witz. Zürich: Scalo, 1996. ISBN 3-931141-25-X. French-language version.
  - Ray's a Laugh. Zürich: Scalo, 2000. ISBN 978-3908247371.
  - Ray's a Laugh. Books on Books No. 18. New York, NY: Errata Editions, 2014. ISBN 978-1935004356. With essays by Charlotte Cotton and Jeffrey Ladd.
- Richard Billingham. Birmingham: Ikon Gallery; Paris: agnès b., 2000. ISBN 9780907594666. With an essay by Michael Tarantino. Exhibition catalogue. Photographs from Billingham's "series of family portraits (1990–1996), earlier black and white family photographs (1990–1991), a new series of urban landscapes (1992–1997), as well as video stills ... from Ray in Bed (1999), Playstation (1999), Liz Smoking (1998) and Tony Smoking Backwards (1998)."
- Black Country. West Bromwich: The Public, 2003. ISBN 0-9540200-2-2.
- Zoo. Birmingham: Vivid, 2007. Edition of 750 copies.
- Richard Billingham: People, Places, Animals. Melbourne: Australian Centre for Contemporary Art, 2008. ISBN 9780977597772. With essays by Juliana Engberg, Rikke Hansen, and Outi Remes. Exhibition catalogue.
- Landscapes, 2001–2003. Stockport: Dewi Lewis, 2008. ISBN 9781904587385. With an essay by Sacha Craddock.
- Ray's a Laugh. Mack, 2024. Expanded and resequenced edition. ISBN 978-1-915743-32-9.

=== Publications with contributions by Billingham ===
- Strange Days: British Contemporary Photography. Milan: Charta, 1997. Edited by Gilda Williams. ISBN 9788881581382. Exhibition catalogue. Text in English and Italian.
- Sensation: Young British Artists from the Saatchi Collection. London: Thames and Hudson, 1998. ISBN 978-0500280423. Sensation exhibition catalogue.

== Films ==
- Fishtank (1998) – documentary video, 47 minutes, commissioned by Artangel and Adam Curtis for BBC television and shown on BBC Two in December 1998
- Liz Smoking (1998) – short documentary video
- Tony Smoking Backwards (1998) – short documentary video
- Ray in Bed (1999) – short documentary video
- Playstation (1999) – short documentary video
- Ray (2016), written and directed by Billingham – 30 minutes, part 1 of 3-part feature film
- Ray & Liz (2018) – feature film

== Awards ==
- 1994: Prestige Photography Prize, University of Sunderland, Sunderland
- 1995: Felix H Mann Memorial Prize, National Museum of Photography, Film and Television, Bradford
- 1997: Citibank Private Bank Photography Prize (now Deutsche Börse Photography Prize), London
- 2001: Shortlisted for the Turner Prize, for his solo exhibition at the Ikon Gallery in Birmingham, and for his contributions to The Sleep of Reason at the Norwich Gallery and to Scène de la Vie Conjugale at Villa Arson in Nice, France.

== Significant group exhibition ==
- Sensation, Royal Academy of Arts, London, 1997; Hamburger Bahnhof, Berlin, 1998–1999. Work from the Saatchi Gallery collection.

== Collections ==
Billingham's work is held in the following permanent collections:

- Government Art Collection, London: 1 print
- Tate, London: 4 prints
- Victoria and Albert Museum, London: 1 print

== Bibliography ==
- Cashell, K. (2020) Photographic Realism: The Art of Richard Billingham. 1st edn. Bloomsbury Publishing.
- Outi Remes "Reinterpreting unconventional family photography: Richard Billingham’s Ray’s a Laugh series" in Afterimage: The Journal of Media Arts and Cultural Criticism (Vol. 34, No. 6, 2007) 16–19.
- Juliana Engberg, Rikke Hansen and Outi Remes Richard Billingham: People, Places, Animals. (Southbank, Australia: Australian Centre for Contemporary Art, 2007). ISBN 0-9775977-7-6.
