= Alan Lake (activist) =

British political activist

Alan Ayling (born 1965), known by the pseudonym Alan Lake, is a computer expert from Highgate, London, who was involved in the English Defence League (EDL). Until 2011, he was a director of Pacific Capital Investment Management.

== Activities ==
Ayling was described by the media in 2011 as a millionaire, and as the "chief financier" of the English Defence League (EDL), which Lake reportedly "fiercely denied". He did admit to having "given some money to help some EDL things happen" in his first television interview, on Norwegian TV 2. According to then EDL leader Tommy Robinson, Ayling had never been a member of the EDL, and the EDL had not received funding from him. Responding to media claims saying the opposite, Robinson said that "he [Ayling] spoke at two demos and he wore a suit, and all of a sudden he was a millionaire funder."

Lake was considered a central figure in organising international counter-jihad contacts. Lake spoke at a seminar on Islamisation in Malmö, Sweden, in 2009, organised by the Sweden Democrats. Lake has since said that he continues to maintain good relations with many of the party's members and that he is a good friend of MP Kent Ekeroth. He has considered that the state "might as well" execute Islamists who seek to impose sharia law in the UK, and according to The Guardian he called for discussion about killing the Archbishop of Canterbury, the Prime Minister David Cameron and the deputy PM Nick Clegg for allegedly supporting sharia law for Britain. Ayling also founded the far-right "4 Freedoms" website.

Lake rarely speaks with the press. According to Nigel Copsey, Lake represented the more "respectable" intellectual wing of the EDL. In October 2011, Norwegian police formally investigated Lake to discover any potential ideological influence he may have had on mass murderer Anders Behring Breivik. He was awarded 5,000 euros in damages by a Maltese court from Paul Adam Cinato for defamation of character after Cinato blogged that Lake was Breivik's mentor. In January 2012, after the true identity of "Alan Lake" was revealed, Ayling was suspended from his management post at the European Bank for Reconstruction and Development in the City of London.
