= Casuals United =

British nationalist protest group

- Formation: 2009
- Dissolved: 2014
- Type: British nationalism; Anti-Islamism; Anti-sharia
- Website: casualsunited.wordpress.com (Archive)

Casuals United was a far-right British protest group. The group was closely affiliated with the English Defence League. The group described itself as "Uniting the UK's Football Tribes against the Jihadists", and as "an alliance of British Football Casuals of various colours/races who have come together in order to create a massive, but peaceful protest group to force our Government to get their act in gear."

Casuals United was organised around 50 British football hooligan firms. A leading organiser of Casuals United was Joe Marsh of Barry, South Wales, who is a former member of Cardiff City's Soul Crew hooligan firm. He has said: "Hooligans from rival clubs are uniting on this and it is like a ready-made army ... We are protesting against the preachers of hate who are actively encouraging young Muslims in this country to take part in a jihad against Britain."

== History ==
=== Formation ===
Casuals United was formed in reaction to protests by some Muslims in Luton, reportedly organised by the Islamist group Al-Muhajiroun, against a parade of members of the 2nd Battalion Royal Anglian Regiment returning from fighting in the war in Afghanistan in March 2009. Social networking sites such as Facebook were used to coordinate protests in London, Luton and Birmingham.

=== Early activities ===
In July 2009 the group picketed an Islamic roadshow in London. Casuals United were one of four groups which were prevented from taking part in unofficial marches after Luton Borough Council applied for a banning order under the Public Order Act. In August 2009, the group staged a protest in Birmingham. More protests in conjunction with the English Defence League took place in Manchester, Leeds, Stoke, Bolton and Dudley.

=== Disbandment and continuation ===
Casuals United was disbanded in 2014, and some members went on to form the Pie and Mash Squad. An article written by Vice News in 2015 opines this group was part of an English far-right war on anti-fascist football ultras groups, such as the left-wing supporters of non-League Clapton F.C.. The article continued that the Pie and Mash Squad was also "coordinating protests against various left-wing non-footballing events.

Former leader of Casuals United, Joe Marsh, was jailed in August 2015 by Southwark Magistrates for a violent assault on a woman at an anti-austerity demonstration.
