= English Defence League =

Far-right political movement in England

- Abbreviation: EDL
- Formation: 27 June 2009; 17 years ago
- Type: Far-right; New social movement; Social movement organisation
- Purpose: Anti-Islamism; Islamophobia; English nationalism; Palingenetic ultranationalism; Populism
- Location: Originated in Luton, England
- Region served: England; Offshoot groups exist in Australia, Denmark, the Netherlands and Norway
- Leader: Tim Ablitt
- Key people: Alan Lake; Tommy Robinson (2009–13); Kevin Carroll (2009–13); Paul Ray (2009)
- Formerly called: English & Jewish Defence League

The English Defence League (EDL) was a far-right, Islamophobic organisation active in England from 2009 until the mid-late 2010s. A social movement and pressure group that employed street demonstrations as its main tactic, the EDL presented itself as a single-issue movement opposed to Islamism and Islamic extremism, although its rhetoric and actions targeted Islam and Muslims more widely.

Established in London, the EDL coalesced around several football hooligan firms protesting the public presence of the Salafi proscribed terrorist group Ahlus Sunnah Wal Jamaah in Luton, Bedfordshire. Tommy Robinson, a former member of the British National Party (BNP), soon became its de facto leader. The organisation grew swiftly, holding demonstrations across England and often clashing with anti-fascist protesters from Unite Against Fascism and other groups, who deemed it a racist organisation victimising British Muslims. The EDL also established a strong social media presence on Facebook and YouTube. Moving towards electoral politics, it established formal links with the far-right British Freedom Party, a breakaway from the BNP. The EDL's reputation was damaged in 2011 after supporters were convicted of plotting to bomb mosques and links were revealed with Norwegian far-right terrorist Anders Behring Breivik. In 2013 Robinson—supported by the Quilliam think tank—left the group. He said it had become too extreme, and established the short-lived rival Pegida UK. EDL membership declined significantly following Robinson's departure, various branches declared independence, and it became defunct several years later.

Ideologically on the extreme-right or far-right of British politics, the EDL was part of the international counter-jihad movement. Rejecting the idea that Muslims can truly be English, the EDL presented Islam as an intolerant, primitive threat seeking to take over Europe. Some political scientists and other commentators characterised this Islamophobic stance as culturally racist. Both online and at its events, EDL members incited violence against Muslims, with supporters carrying out violent acts both at demonstrations and independently. The EDL's broader ideology featured nationalism, nativism, and populism, blaming a perceived decline in English culture on high immigration rates and an uncaring political elite. It distinguished itself from Britain's traditional far-right by rejecting biological racism, antisemitism, and homophobia. Commentators differed on whether the EDL itself was ideologically fascist, although several of its leaders were previously involved in fascist organisations and some neo-Nazis and other fascists attended EDL events. The group also spawned an offshoot called the European Defence League.

Largely headed by a centralised leadership team, in its heyday the EDL sub-divided into over 90 local and thematic divisions, each with considerable autonomy. Its support base consisted primarily of young, working-class white British men, some from established far-right and football hooligan subcultures. Polls indicated that most UK citizens opposed the EDL, and the organisation was repeatedly challenged by anti-fascist groups. Many local councils and police forces discouraged EDL marches, citing the high cost of policing them, the disruptive influence on community harmony, and the damage caused to counter-terrorism operations.

== History ==
A variation of the EDL flag, used in demonstrations alongside the Flag of England

In the early 21st century, Muslims were Britain's second largest and fastest-growing religious group; according to the 2011 census, 2.7 million people in England and Wales described themselves as Muslim, representing 4.8% of the total population. At the same time, Muslims became the main scapegoat for far-right groups across Western society. In Britain, this was partly because prejudices against Jews and African-Caribbean people—both communities the far-right previously used as social scapegoats—were increasingly socially unacceptable. In the latter half of the 20th century, most British Muslims were of South Asian heritage. When they faced racist abuse, such as "Paki-bashing", it was usually because of their racial background, rather than their religious belief. By the 21st century, British Muslims were increasingly targeted because they were Muslim, including by members of other ethnic minorities in the country.

The British National Party (BNP) was most successful at exploiting growing hostility against Muslims. It launched an anti-Muslim campaign in 2000, which gained momentum after Salafi jihadi Muslims perpetrated the 2001 September 11 attacks in the United States and the 7 July 2005 bombings in London. This resulted in growing electoral success for the BNP: it secured a seat on the London Assembly in 2008 and two seats at the European Parliament in 2010. By 2011, this support had declined, with the party losing many of its local council seats. However, as noted by the political scientist Chris Allen, the BNP had "extended the frontier of the far right in British politics", creating an environment on which the English Defence League would capitalise.

=== Foundation: 2009 ===
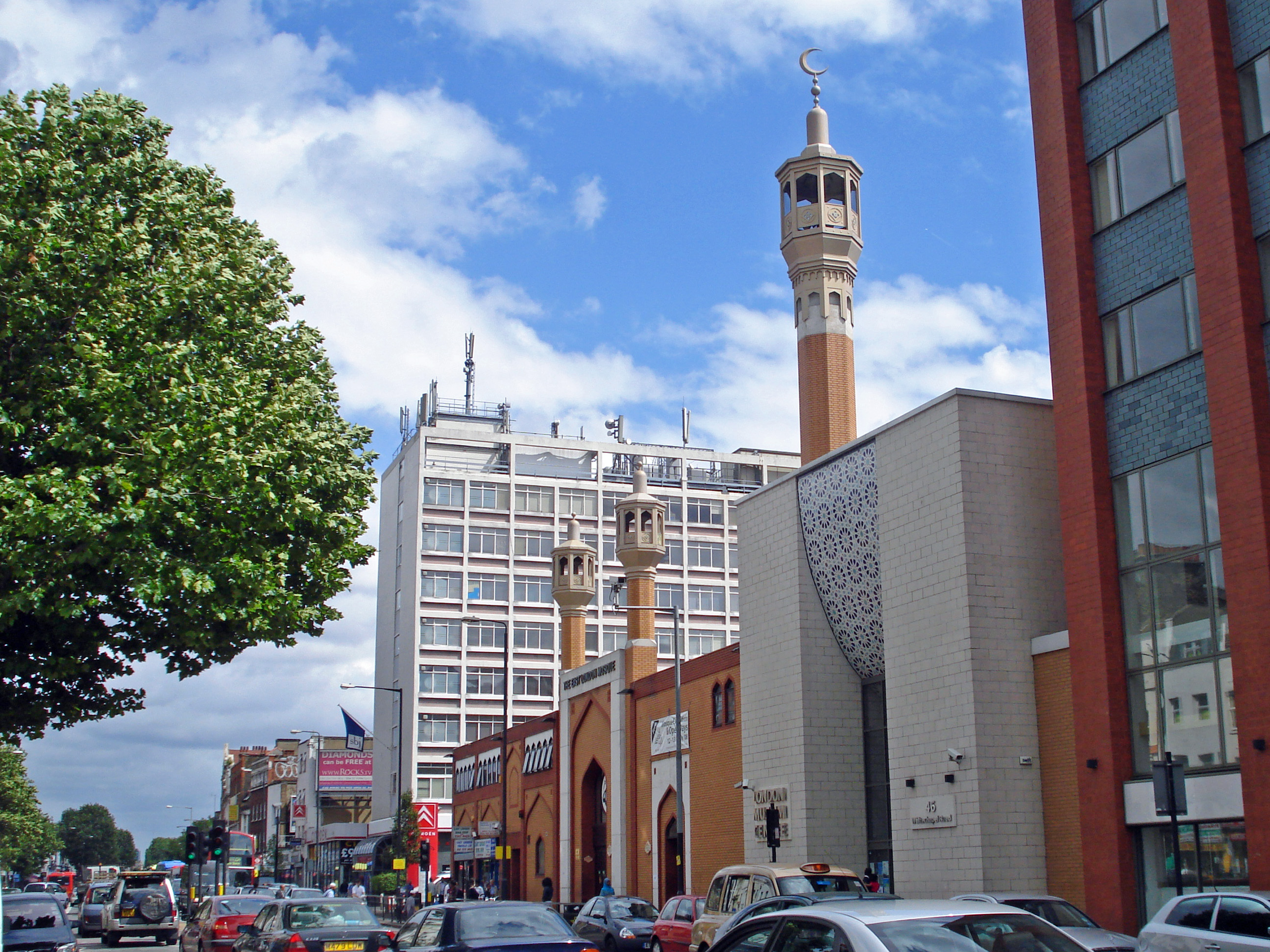
The EDL's first protest took place outside of the East London Mosque in Whitechapel in June 2009.

The town of Luton in Bedfordshire—which had a Muslim population of around 18%—had a history of radical Islamist recruitment. On 10 March 2009, the small, extreme British Salafi Islamist group Ahlus Sunnah wal Jamaah demonstrated in the town to protest against the Royal Anglian Regiment's homecoming parade following the latter's posting in Afghanistan. The demonstration—which was disowned by representatives of Luton's main Islamic communities—was a deliberately provocative stunt, one which soon attracted media attention and anger that the authorities were permitting it to go ahead.

A former regiment member, James Yeomans, organised a counter protest for 28 March. After local anti-Islamist blogger Paul "Lionheart" Ray publicised Yeomans' event online, various self-described "anti-jihadist" far-right groups that had emerged from the football hooligan firm scene—including the Welsh Defence League (WDL) and the March for England (MfE)—announced their intention to attend. Fearing the far right would hijack his event, Yeomans cancelled it. In its place, Ray organised an "anti-jihadist" march for St. George's Day under the banner of the new United People of Luton (UPL), although this was broken up by police. The UPL organised a second demonstration for 24 May, titled "Ban the Terrorists": this again resulted in disorder, with police making several arrests.

A related group was Casuals United, founded by established football hooligan Jeff Marsh: their website used the tagline "One Nation, One Enemy, One Firm", reflecting the group's desire to unite rival football firms in opposition to what it called the "Islamification" of Britain.

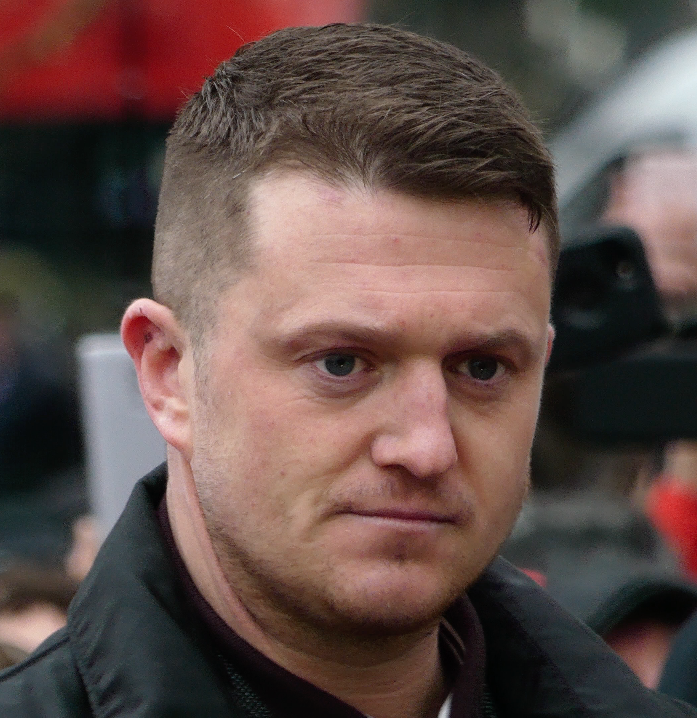
Tommy Robinson (pictured in 2018) became de facto leader of the EDL shortly after its formation.

It was from this environment that the English Defence League was officially formed on 27 June 2009. Ray claimed to have been its founder, describing how the EDL united the UPL with other "anti-jihadist" groups from around England. Its creation reflected what the political scientist Roger Eatwell termed "cumulative extremism", whereby the "activities of one extremist group trigger the formation of another". The EDL took its name from that of the Welsh Defence League; its founders also considered the name "British Defence League", but rejected this as being too similar to that of the British National Party. The EDL's foundation was accompanied by an impromptu protest outside the East London Mosque in Whitechapel, which police quickly dispersed. The following week the group picketed an event in Wood Green, North London organised by Salafi Islamist preacher Anjem Choudary and his Islam4UK group. Its first major public appearance to attract attention was in August, when the EDL and Casuals United held a joint protest in Birmingham, prompted by Ahlus Sunnah wal Jamaah's conversion of an eleven-year-old white boy in that city. Ray distanced himself from that event, arguing that the chosen date—8 August—was a deliberate reference to 88, a code for HH (Heil Hitler), in neo-Nazi circles.

Not long after the group's formation, Ray formed a sub-group, the St. George Division; this broke from the EDL soon after, when Ray emigrated. This left the way for Tommy Robinson to become the EDL's de facto leader. A former BNP member with criminal convictions for assault, Robinson's real name is Stephen Yaxley-Lennon; the pseudonym was borrowed from the head of a Luton football hooligan firm. Robinson was clearly spoken, articulate and able to present his views in an assured and eloquent way during television interviews and other encounters with the media. According to the political scientist Joel Busher, Robinson was "a high-energy, fast-talking, all action character whose combination of swagger, self-deprecation and derring-do helped make him a popular figurehead within the movement." Ray was critical of his successor, and—from his new base in Malta—posted videos to YouTube in which he threatened to retake control of the EDL. These threats came to nothing.

Robinson's right-hand man was his cousin, Kevin Carroll, also a former BNP member with a criminal conviction; Carroll was the first of the pair to attract national attention, appearing on the BBC documentary Young, British and Angry. Another senior member was the multimillionaire IT consultant and fundamentalist Christian Alan Ayling, who used the pseudonym Alan Lake; allegations have been made, but not substantiated, that Lake was the group's primary financier, providing it with millions of pounds. Lake never become a visible figure in the movement and few members knew his name; it was at Lake's flat in London's Barbican area, however, where Ray, Robinson, and Ann Marchini had discussed the EDL's formation in May 2009.

=== Growth: 2010–2013 ===
If it were not for the inaction of the government in dealing properly with this form of Islamic fascism, there would be no need for groups such as The English Defence League, Welsh Defence League, Scottish Defence League and Ulster Defence League to counter this threat on the streets and on-line ... Our movement is purely set up to pressure whatever government we have in power to deal with this menace and undo all the damage caused by apathy and appeasement.

— Statement on the EDL website

Following the BNP's decline as a serious electoral force, the EDL's profile rose dramatically. The group portrayed itself as a necessary response to public frustration at government inaction in dealing with what the EDL initially termed "extremist Muslim preachers and organisations". It claimed that Englishness had been marginalised throughout England, citing the fact that some local authorities had ceased flying the flag of St George and that some state schools only supplied halal meat and had stopped celebrating Nativity plays at Christmas time.

The EDL focused on organising demonstrations: between 2009 and 2015, it held an average of between ten and fifteen demonstrations per year, attracting crowds of between 100 and 3000. It faced opposition from media commentators and anti-fascist groups, who described it as racist, far right, and extreme right, terms rejected by the EDL. Most notable among the anti-fascist groups organising counter-protests was Unite Against Fascism, while Islamic groups sometimes also held counter-protests. In turn, the EDL targeted left-wing groups. In December 2010, Robinson threatened action against student anti-fee protesters, while in 2011 the EDL harassed Occupy anti-capitalist protesters in London. During the 2011 England riots, EDL members mobilised in largely white areas of Outer London, such as Enfield and Eltham, stating that they were there to "defend" them from rioters. These also resulted in clashes with police, and in one incident EDL members attacked a bus primarily carrying black youths.

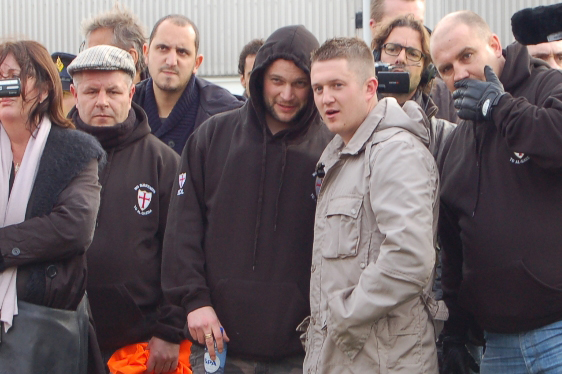
Tommy Robinson (centre-right, in the light coloured jacket) with other EDL members on a visit to Amsterdam

The EDL began to lose momentum in 2011. Contributing factors included regional rivalries between divisions, a resurgence of sectarian enmities between rival football firms, and personal squabbles. By early 2011, several divisions in northern England were referring to themselves as "the Infidels", expressing an increasingly separate identity from the EDL. Several northern groups expressed support for a former EDL regional organiser, John "Snowy" Shaw, who had accused Robinson and Carroll of financial impropriety. At a February 2011 EDL rally in Blackburn, Shaw's supporters violently clashed with Robinson's; Robinson fought with a fellow member at the rally, resulting in a September 2011 conviction for assault. Robinson's criminal record prevented him from entering the US, but in September 2011 he sought to do so illegally by using someone else's passport. He was caught and returned to Britain; in January 2013 he was convicted of breaching the Identity Documents Act 2010 and imprisoned for ten months. Robinson's imprisonment coincided with Carroll's bail conditions, which barred him from contacting fellow EDL members; this left the organisation without its co-leaders for part of 2012.

The revelation of links to Norwegian far-right activist Anders Behring Breivik, perpetrator of bombing and shooting attacks that killed 77 people in July 2011, further damaged the EDL. He was affiliated with the EDL's Norwegian sister organisation, the Norwegian Defence League, and stated that he had "more than 600 EDL members as Facebook friends and have spoken with tens [sic] of EDL members and leaders". Breivik described EDL co-founder Ray as his "mentor", having been in communication with him since 2002. Four months before his attack, Breivik posted on the EDL website, describing them as an "inspiration" and "a blessing to all in Europe". Online, he described having attended an EDL rally in Bradford. Robinson denied any EDL links with Breivik and deplored the killings; however, after Breivik was convicted, some EDL members praised his actions. In July 2011, Interpol requested Maltese police investigate Ray due to his links with Breivik; he too condemned the killings, calling them "pure evil". From 25th July 2011 to 13th June 2014, the English Defence League rebranded themselves to the English & Jewish Defence League. In December 2011, two EDL supporters—one a serving soldier in the British military—were convicted of plotting to bomb a mosque in Stoke-on-Trent.

==== Building political links ====
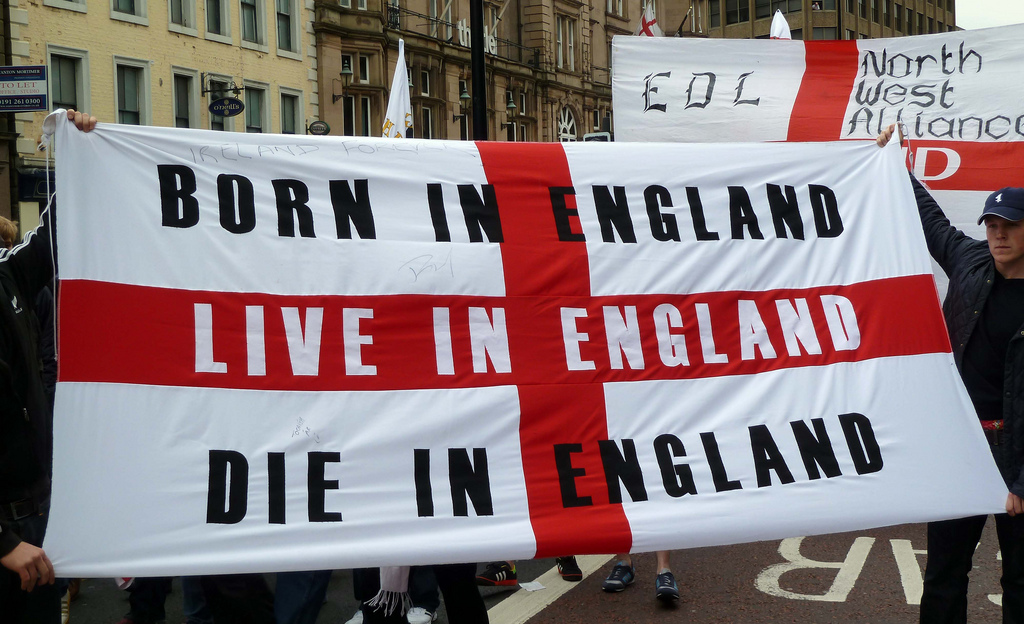
The flag of St George displayed at an EDL demonstration in Newcastle in 2010

The EDL developed links with the British Freedom Party (BFP), a BNP breakaway founded in October 2010. The BFP was led by Eddy Butler, who had previously made an unsuccessful attempt to oust the BNP leader Nick Griffin. The BFP wanted to move closer to mainstream politics by disassociating itself from the BNP's emphasis on biological racism and imitating continental European right-wing groups such as the Dutch Party for Freedom. In May 2012, it was announced that Robinson and Carroll would join the BFP's executive council as joint vice chairs, cementing links between the BFP and the EDL. Robinson soon resigned from this position, citing a desire to focus on the EDL, although critics suggested that this may have been to shield the BFP from criminal proceedings he then faced.

In 2012, Carroll stood for election in the Police and Crime Commissioner elections. In January 2013, he took charge of the BFP after its leader, Paul Weston, resigned. The BFP did poorly at a series of local elections, failing to gain sufficient votes to have its deposits returned; its failure to register correctly led the Electoral Commission to remove its registration. Among the EDL grassroots, there had been much opposition to association with the BFP; many feared that it would damage the EDL's reputation or stressed their desire to be part of a street movement rather than a political party. The EDL subsequently established links with another BNP breakaway group; in February 2013, it provided a security force for an event by the far-right British Democratic Party (BDP), which was founded by Andrew Brons, who had previously represented the BNP at the European Parliament.

=== Decline: 2013–2015 ===
By early 2013, commentators believed that the EDL was in decline, reflected in the decreasing numbers attending its events, Robinson's imprisonment, and its failure to enter electoral politics. Groups which had closely allied to the EDL, such as Casuals United and March for England, were reasserting their individual identities. Splinter groups appeared, among them the North West Infidels, North East Infidels, South East Alliance and Combined Ex-Forces. Some of these, such as the North West Infidels and South East Alliance, adopted more extreme perspectives, cooperating with the fascist National Front and making reference to the white supremacist Fourteen Words slogan on their social media. Other activists moved away from the EDL to focus on campaigning for Brexit, the UK's exit from the European Union. It is possible that the electoral growth of the right-wing UK Independence Party (UKIP) in this period also contributed to the EDL's decline, with many EDL supporters finding it easier to vote for UKIP than physically attend EDL events. In April 2013, the EDL leadership requested that members use tactical voting to benefit UKIP; the latter responded by distancing itself from the EDL.

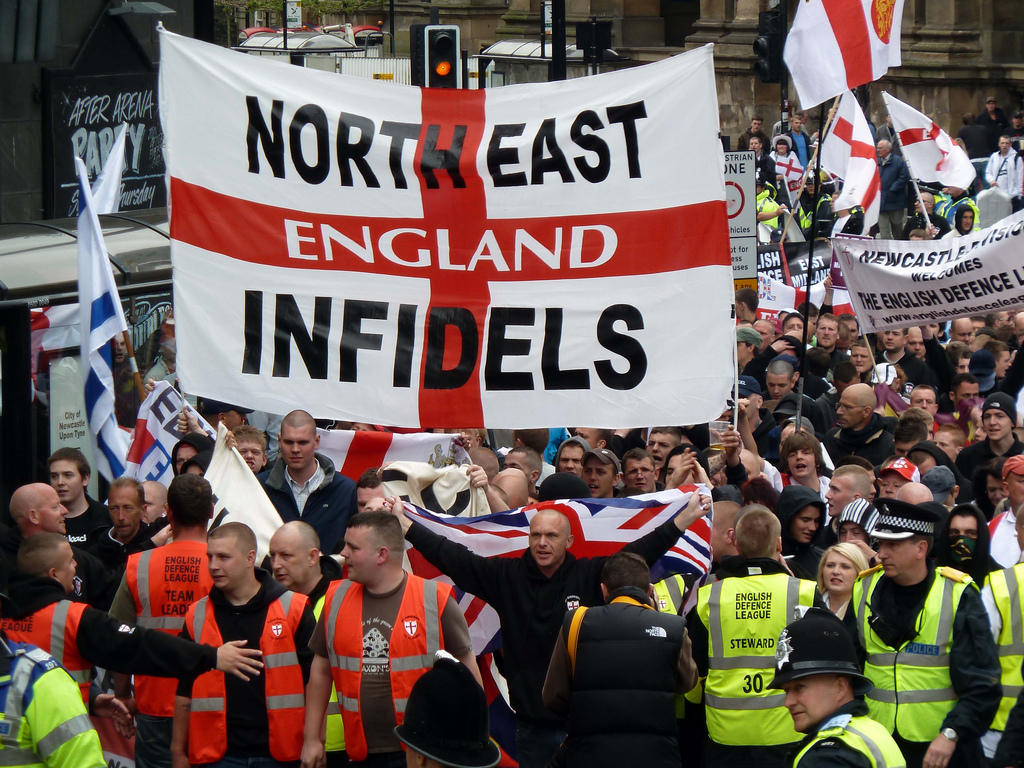
The North East Infidels at an EDL rally; this was one of the splinter groups which emerged from the EDL as it fragmented

The EDL experienced a brief resurgence in its fortunes after Islamist militants killed the British Army soldier Lee Rigby in southeast London in May 2013. The group tripled its number of Facebook followers in the 24 hours after the incident, and organised several flash demonstrations. At one such event, Robinson told members that "What you saw today [i.e. Rigby's killing] is Islam. Everyone's had enough." In late May, the EDL held a demonstration in central London that attracted a thousand participants; another, held in central Birmingham in July, attracted several hundred.

On 8 October 2013, Robinson and Carroll announced that they were leaving the EDL following meetings with the think tank Quilliam. Robinson said that street protests were "no longer effective" and "acknowledged the dangers of far-right extremism". He stated his intention to continue to combat extremism by forming a new party. Both Robinson and Carroll had been taking lessons in Islam from a Quilliam member, Usama Hasan, and stated their intent to train in lobbying institutions. Quilliam had given Robinson £8000 to facilitate his departure; it hoped that doing so would "decapitate" the EDL. Robinson's departure generated much anger among the grassroots, many of whom thought him a traitor. A meeting of the group's regional organisers led to the EDL's adoption of a new system of collective leadership, through which the 19 regional organisers formed a governing committee with a rotating chair. The first to take on this role was Tim Ablitt; in February 2014 he was succeeded by Steve Eddowes; and in December 2015 by Ian Crossland, with the grassroots having been given a voice in his selection through an online vote.

=== Legacy: 2016–present ===
Although the EDL had declined, the sentiments feeding it—especially anger at immigration and Islam—remained widespread across Britain's white working-class communities. Other far-right groups emerged to claim the space in British society that it left vacant, often utilising the EDL's tactics. Britain First sought to court disenchanted EDL members, adopting similar street protests: it organised "Christian patrols" through areas with Islamic communities, as well as "mosque invasions" in which members entered mosques to disrupt proceedings. In December 2015, Robinson and Anne Marie Waters launched another anti-Islam street movement, Pegida UK, hoping to imitate the successes of the German Pegida movement. Pegida UK had more self-governance mechanisms than the EDL and pursued silent, non-confrontational protests, although failed to attract sizeable numbers and held its last public event in 2016.

By 2023 and 2024, news publications and anti-extremist group Hope not Hate considered the EDL defunct as an organisation, though they said that some members of the far-right still identified themselves as supporters of the EDL, and that its ideology still remained prominent in the now more decentralised British far right. Following far-right violence at London's Cenotaph on Armistice Day 2023, an event at which Robinson was present, Prime Minister Rishi Sunak condemned those involved as "EDL thugs". Following the murder of three children in Southport in July 2024, far-right rioting broke out locally before spreading to other parts of the UK. Individuals who identified as EDL supporters were among the rioters, and in response Deputy Prime Minister Angela Rayner suggested the EDL could be proscribed as a terrorist organisation. Joe Mulhall, head of Hope Not Hate, dismissed the idea that the EDL was responsible for the riots or that banning it would be effective, "because the organisation no longer exists".

== Ideology ==
[D]espite its claims to the contrary, there is much prima face [sic] evidence to place the EDL on the more radical fringes of the political right. This ranges from its populist, nationalist agenda; to its condemnation of leftwing figures on its various blogs and websites; to its strong associations with the US Tea Party movement; to its support for international far right figures, such as Geert Wilders. Moreover[...], key EDL figures, such as Steven Yaxley‐Lennon and Kevin Carroll, have historic links with the British National Party (BNP). Finally[...], extreme right‐wing movements, such as the Aryan Strike Force, have found the EDL a useful host organisation.

— Historian of the far right Paul Jackson

Political scientists locate the EDL on the far-right of the left–right political spectrum, sometimes referring to its ideology as "extreme right", or "right-wing extremism". In various respects, it resembled other far-right groups, particularly those that emerged across early 21st century Europe. From its early days, its demonstrations were attended by members of older far-right parties such as the National Front and the British National Party, however the EDL itself differed from these older groups by reaching out to Jews, people of colour, and LGBT people, against whom the British far right historically discriminated. Thus, the historian of the far right Paul Jackson referred to it as part of a "new far right" which presented itself as being more moderate than its predecessors.

The EDL disavowed the "far-right" label, describing itself as "non-political, taking no position on right-wing vs. left-wing. We welcome members from all over the political spectrum, and with varying views on foreign policy, united against Islamic extremism and its influence on British life." When examining the EDL's public statements, Jackson cautioned against automatically taking them at face value; as he noted, far-right groups typically present "front stage" messages for public consumption which conceal the more aggressive views expressed in private.

Rather than labelling the EDL "far-right", the ethnographer Hilary Pilkington suggested that the group was better classified under Cas Mudde's concept of the "populist radical right". Other scholarly commentators also considered the group to be populist because of its claim to represent "ordinary people" against the liberal elites who it alleged controlled Britain.

=== Counter-jihad, anti-Islamism and Islamophobia ===
The EDL was part of the broader "counter-jihad" movement, an international far-right phenomenon focused on opposing the presence of Islam in Western states.

The EDL was part of the international counter-jihad movement. Political scientist Hilary Aked defined counter-jihadism as "a section of the far-right distinguished by its hostility to migrants, Muslims and Islam." Political scientist, Matthew Goodwin, said that the counter-jihad movement was "united by their belief that Islam and Muslims are posing a fundamental threat to the resources, identities and even survival of Western states", and that counter-jihad groups were "more confrontational, chaotic and unpredictable than traditional anti-immigrant and ethnic nationalist movements in Western democracies".

Pilkington characterised the EDL as an "anti-Islamist movement", but considered there to be crossover with broader anti-Islam or anti-Muslim positions. The EDL stated that it only opposed the "Islamic extremist" but not the "ordinary Muslim", a distinction also drawn by many of its activists. However, the EDL's rhetoric regularly failed to make this distinction, and the group and its members alleged that British Muslims implicitly supported Islamic extremism by failing to speak out against it. Research examining the group's rhetoric and membership found that many failed to understand the distinction between different variants of Islam.

Various scholars describe the EDL as Islamophobic, a characterisation the EDL rejected. It did so by defining "Islamophobia" as a phobia or affected prejudice, a definition different from the majority of academics and activists employing the term, stating that "the English Defence League do not 'fear' Islam, we do not have a 'phobia' about Islam, we just realise the very serious threat it poses".

EDL members regularly referred to Islam as an "ideology" or a "cult" rather than a "religion". They perceived it as a threat to Western culture; evoking Samuel P. Huntington's notion of the Clash of Civilizations, the group's discourse constructed a binary division between Western and Islamic culture, the former presented as tolerant and progressive and the latter as intolerant and backward. EDL rhetoric explicitly distinguished Muslims from the English national group: for the EDL, a Muslim could not be truly English, and the idea of an English Muslim or a British Muslim identity was not considered acceptable. The EDL feared that Muslims want to dominate Britain by imposing sharia law, and interpreted the building of mosques as evidence of this desire for domination. It claimed that this Islamic takeover was being facilitated by higher birth rates among Muslims than non-Muslims, and presented Muslim participation in political life as entryism, an attempt to expand Islamic influence in Britain.

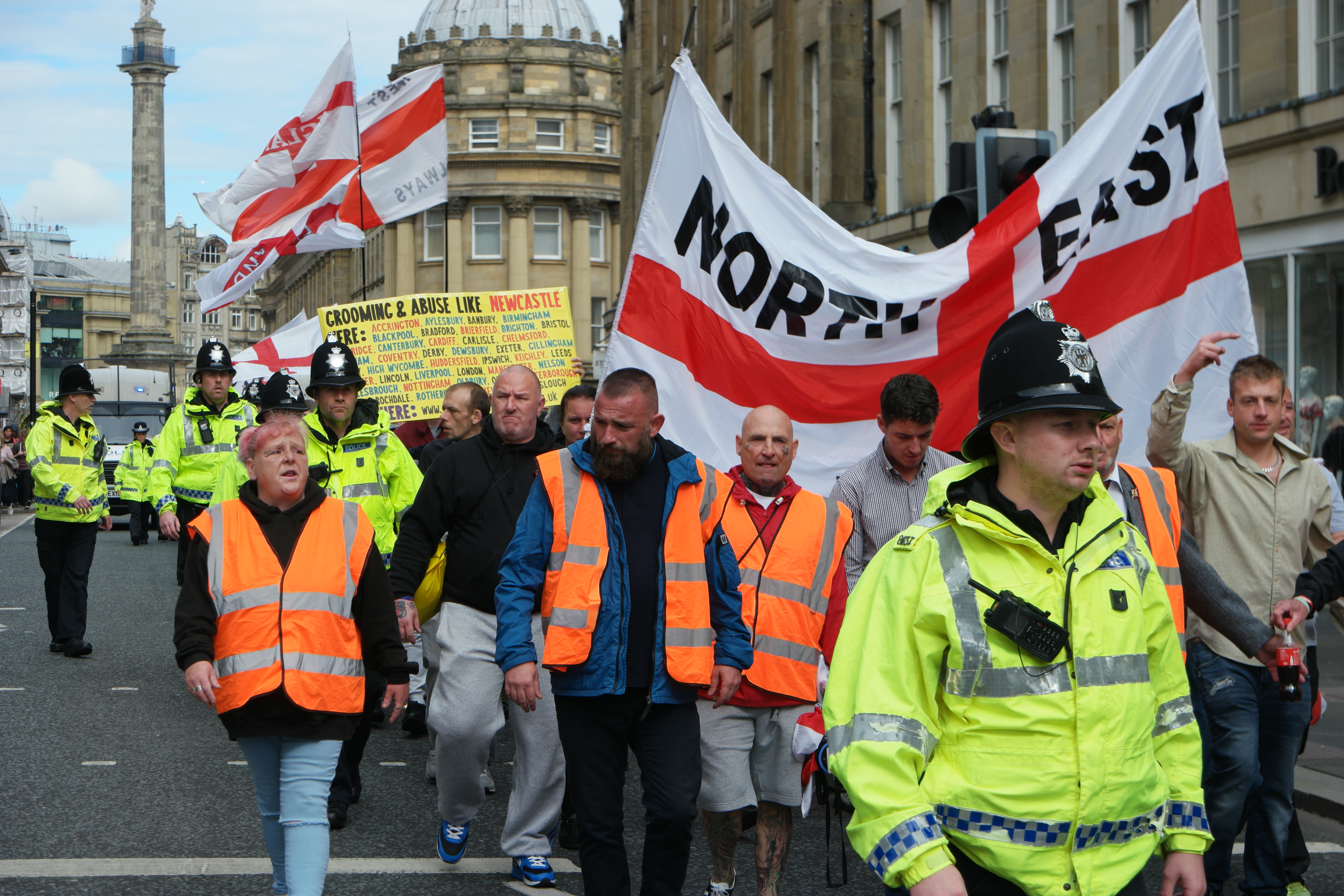
An EDL march in Newcastle in 2017

EDL discourse expressed a belief in "Islamic supremacism", the notion that Muslims feel themselves superior to non-Muslims, and accordingly thought that Muslims regarded non-Muslims as legitimate targets for abuse and exploitation. A topic of particular anger among members was the role of Muslim men in grooming gangs targeting largely underage white girls. For instance, in drawing attention to the fact that men from Islamic backgrounds were disproportionately represented in the Rochdale and West Midlands child sex grooming scandals, the EDL said these men found justification for their actions in Qur'anic references to non-Muslims being inferior. Conversely, when white sex offenders were exposed, EDL members regarded the perpetrator's ethnicity or religion as irrelevant. EDL members also expressed anger at perceived Muslim involvement in drug dealing and other crimes affecting their communities, and at the perceived wealth of British Muslims, which they contrasted with their own strained economic situation.

The sociologists Simon Winlow, Steve Hall and James Treadwell noted that all the EDL members they encountered expressed hatred of Muslims. Many placed this hatred in relation to local issues and personal experiences; for instance, EDL members regarded being poorly treated by an Asian shopkeeper as evidence that Muslims intrinsically hate the white working class. Others expressed anger at events they had seen in the media, such as Muslims burning remembrance poppies in protest at British military activities abroad. On the EDL's social media, many supporters incited violence against Muslims: examples included "we need to kill", "time to get violent", and "Kill any muslim u see [sic]". Chants during rallies included "Die, Muslim, die", and "Give me a gun and I'll shoot the Muzzie scum". The racial slur "paki" was also common at private EDL meetings, and at demonstrations; chants used include "I hate Pakis more than you" and "If we all hate Pakis, clap your hands".

=== Nationalism, anti-immigrationism, and views on race and sexuality ===
The EDL was nationalist, or ultra-nationalist, and its members regarded themselves as patriots. Some academics argued the group was ethnic nationalist, although Pilkington stressed that despite their nativist sentiment, most members' sense of English pride was distinct from the "white pride" of fascists, and Meadowcoft and Morrow observed that it was not biologically racist. Its members' understandings of "Englishness" were nevertheless ambiguous and ill-defined; the only thing they agreed upon about the English way of life was that Muslims fundamentally reject it. The EDL presented English identity as something under threat, views reflected in chants like "we want our country back". Its nationalism was foregrounded in its nomenclature and symbolism, which regularly included the cross of St George. Such imagery evoked the symbolism of the medieval Crusades; the group's Latin motto, "in hoc signo vinces", was that of the first Christian Roman Emperor, Constantine.

Robinson described the EDL as a 'multicultural organization made up of every community in this country'. If true, this would clearly make the EDL substantially different to anything typically seen in the traditionally 'all white' make-up of what is deemed to be the far right. And, indeed, this is a unique feature of the EDL. Reflecting its origins in football firms, not only does the EDL march behind banners that state 'Black and white unite against Islamic extremism'—it also marches carrying Israeli flags—but a number of those marching are of black, Asian or mixed heritages. Unlike other far-right organizations, the EDL is proud to recognize and proclaim its diversity.

— Political scientist Chris Allen

Alessio and Meredith thought the EDL was anti-immigrant, and anti-migrant sentiment was common among EDL members. Its members saw immigration as being detrimental to the white British, believing that it fundamentally changed the nature of England, contributed to social division, and resulted in economic competition, with migrants outcompeting white Britons by working for less than the legal minimum wage. At the same time, EDL members often expressed sympathy for migrants as individuals seeking a better life, and typically distinguished between "good" migrants who worked hard and paid taxes and "bad" migrants who live off the welfare state.

The EDL stated that it was not racist, employing the slogan "Black and White unite: all races and religions are welcome in the EDL". It formed specific divisions for Hindu, Sikh, Jewish, Greek and Cypriot, and Pakistani Christian supporters, and small numbers of Asian, African, and biracial supporters attended its events. These were often viewed as "trophy" members, with many white members asking to have their photographs taken with them. Members often stressed that they had ethnic minority friends and family as a means of countering accusations of racism, adopting the view that "lack of racism towards one group is assumed to be evidence of lack of racism against all". Members often viewed the multi-racial nature of England positively, although almost uniformly rejected the ideology of multiculturalism. In their view, mainstream politicians had encouraged multiculturalism both to be seen as being cosmopolitan and progressive but also because of their fascination for the exoticism of other cultures.

The EDL condemned homophobia and established an LGBT division in March 2010. This pro-LGBT rights stance allowed the EDL to criticise what it presented as the left's refusal to confront Islamic homophobia. Pilkington argued that this pro-LGBT rights stance was not solely a cynical ploy by the EDL's leadership, but reflected widespread views within the movement. She observed gay and transgender speakers receiving a warm reception at EDL rallies, where the LGBT rainbow flag was regularly flown, but at the same time also heard homophobic comments at EDL events.

=== Relationship to fascism and neo-Nazism ===
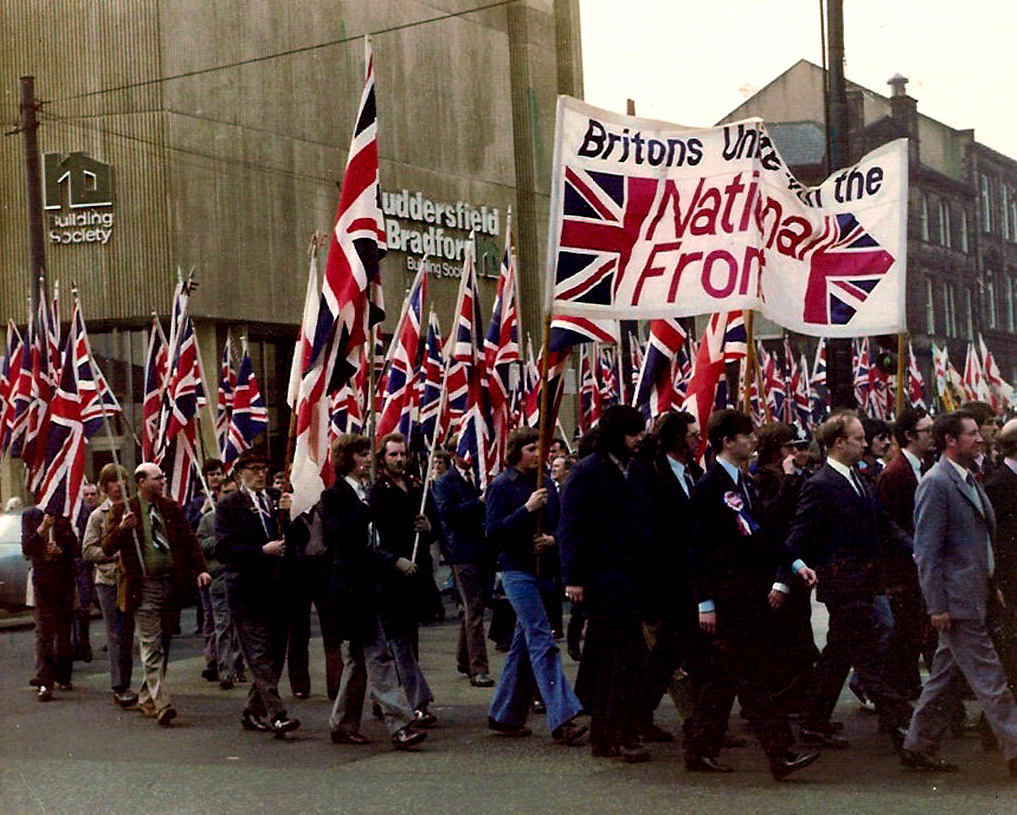
A march by the fascist National Front (NF) in Yorkshire during the 1970s. The EDL's tactics of street marches and demonstrations have been described as being similar to those of the NF.

Several commentators argued that the EDL was not fascist. Nigel Copsey, a historian of the far-right, stated that the EDL was not driven by the same "ideological end-goal" as neo-fascist and other fascist groups; unlike fascists, the EDL did not express a desire for major structural change to the British state. Several fascist groups distanced themselves from the EDL; the BNP leader Nick Griffin for instance said the EDL was a false flag operation manipulated by "Zionists". Conversely, the political scientists Dominic Alessio and Meredith Kristen argued that the EDL "embodied" many of the "key characteristics of fascism": a staunch nationalism and calls for national rebirth, a propensity for violence, and what they described as "pronounced anti-democratic and anti-liberal tendencies" among its leaders. They highlighted that much of the group's leadership came directly from the fascist BNP, and that EDL events have been supported by present and former members of fascist groups like the National Front, the Racial Volunteer Force, Blood & Honour, and Combat 18.

The EDL was not a neo-Nazi organisation. It distanced itself from neo-Nazism, burning a Nazi flag, flying the Israeli flag during demonstrations, and creating a Jewish division. In 2010, Robinson stated: "We're not Nazis, we're not fascists – we will smash Nazis the same way we will smash militant Islam." Despite this, neo-Nazis attended EDL events, sometimes creating "inner circles" within the movement to recruit members to their cause. Early EDL demonstrations were advertised on the white supremacist website Stormfront, Holocaust denial was expressed on the EDL's social media platforms, and at EDL events various individuals gave the Nazi straight-arm salute. This neo-Nazi presence drove some other EDL members away. In 2011, the head of the EDL's Jewish Division, Roberta Moore, left the organisation because of it; Robinson also cited the difficulty in dealing with these neo-Nazis as a reason for stepping down from his leadership position. The EDL responded to their presence by banning some neo-Nazis from its events, a move with widespread support from EDL members more broadly, who were keen to distance themselves from neo-Nazism.

== Organisation and structure ==
A social movement—and more specifically a new social movement and social movement organisation—the EDL was a direct action or street-based protest movement. A pressure group rather than a political party, its members often stressed their opinion that it was not a political organisation. Like other counter-jihad groups in Western countries, the EDL described itself as a human rights organisation, a characterisation not widely accepted among the British public.

=== Leadership and branches ===
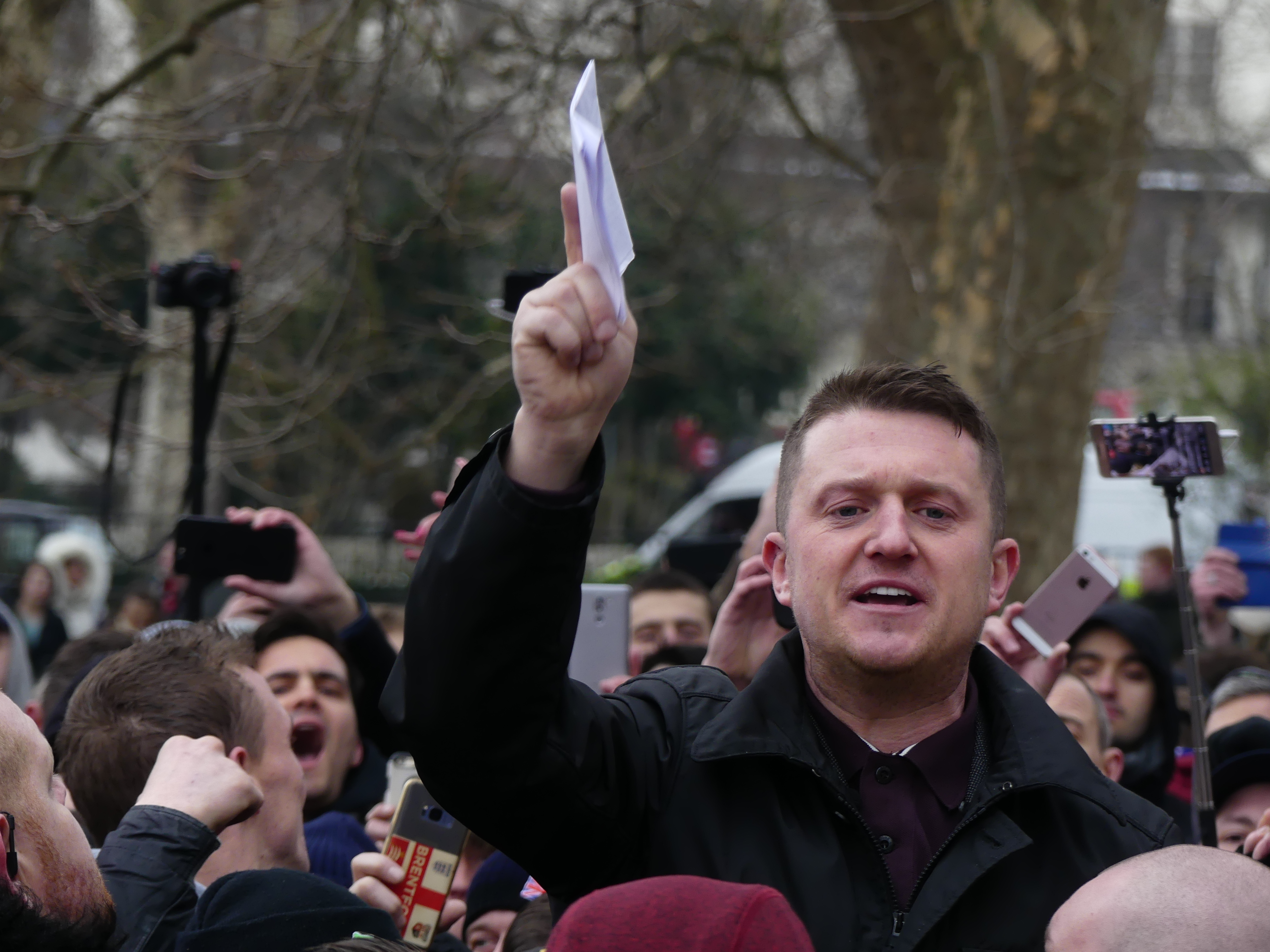
Robinson was the EDL's co-leader during its period of major growth and national attention.

The EDL's informal structure lacked strict hierarchy, or clear leadership. In its early years, the EDL was controlled by a leadership group referred to as the "team"; this included Robinson, although other members often remained anonymous or used pseudonyms. In 2010, the EDL went through a formal restructuring to deal with Robinson's absence, although until October 2013 the EDL was led by Robinson and Carroll as co-leaders, supported by the regional organisers of the 19 regional divisions. After that duo left, it was reorganised around a committee leadership headed by a rotating chair.

The EDL lacked a central regulatory structure through which to impose a uniform approach to strategy or maintain ideological purity. Meadowcroft and Morrow argued that it was this weak self-governance that contributed to the group's fragmentation and demise. It operated through a loose network of local divisions, each largely autonomous; this loose structure was popular among the membership. There was no system of official membership recognised through membership cards, and no membership fees. The EDL formerly divided into at least 90 different divisions. Branches typically held their meetings in pubs with sympathetic owners, referred to as "HQs". These meetings—which were infrequent and often poorly attended—were typically unstructured, lacking any formal agenda or the taking of minutes. As well as these divisional meetings, EDL divisions also held "meet and greet" events to attract new membership.

Some divisions were based on locality and others on special interests. The latter included a women's division, Jewish division, Sikh division, Hindu division, LGBT division, disabled division, green division, a soldiers' division, and a youth division. These groups were designed to raise the profile of particular social groups within the EDL and help to draw recruits from sectors of society that normally avoided membership in a far-right group, such as ethnic minorities and LGBT people. Some local divisions covered whole cities or counties while in other cases there could be more than one division representing a single postcode, in part due to personal disputes. Local groups were organised into a series of nine areas: North West, North East, East Midlands, West Midlands, East Anglia, South West, South East, South East Central, and Greater London. In 2010, new regional organisers were introduced for each; the EDL was heavily reliant on these grassroots networks and the initiative of local and regional leaders.

=== Demonstrations ===
EDL activism has taken place across a range of more or less public and managed spaces. These have included official street demonstrations of varying size, unofficial or 'flash' demonstrations, petitions against mosques, leafleting campaigns, attempted boycotts of restaurants selling halal food, organisational social media pages, personal social media pages of activists, memorials for symbolically significant events and various charity fundraisers.

— Political scientist Joel Busher

The EDL's primary activity was street protests, which regularly attracted media attention. However, there was no coherent plan as to how these demonstrations would achieve the group's stated goals.

EDL protests came in three forms: national demonstrations attracting activists from across the country, local demonstrations featuring largely the local EDL division, and flash demonstrations held without giving the authorities prior warning of the event. The use of aggressive street rallies has a long history among the British far right, having been previously used by the British Union of Fascists in the 1930s, the National Front in the 1970s, and the British National Party in the 1980s and 1990s.

Copsey noted that the "overwhelming majority" of attendees at EDL demonstrations were "young, white, working-class males". Far rarer were women, or people of colour. EDL members had a "street uniform" in the form of wristbands, t-shirts, and hoodies bearing the group's logo. The hoodie was often selected for its intimidating atmosphere and for its symbolic connections with the chav stereotype, thus reasserting members' working-class identity. Many members wore masks decorated with either the EDL logo or the St George's cross; some wore pig face masks or masks of figures whom they wished to ridicule, such as the Salafi jihadist leader Osama bin Laden. Others carried the English flag of St George or the British Union Jack flag, and the Israeli and LGBT Pride flags were also often in attendance. Reflecting the place of football hooligans in the EDL, some male members wore expensive designer clothing to its rallies.

To reach national events, local EDL groups often hired coaches to transport them to their destination. The coach provided a space in which these members engaged in singing, banter, story-telling, and practical jokes. As well as being protests, these demonstrations served as social events for EDL members, helping to forge a sense of solidarity and of the EDL as "one big family". At demonstrations, many members—including those too young to legally drink—consume large quantities of alcohol, and sometimes also cocaine.

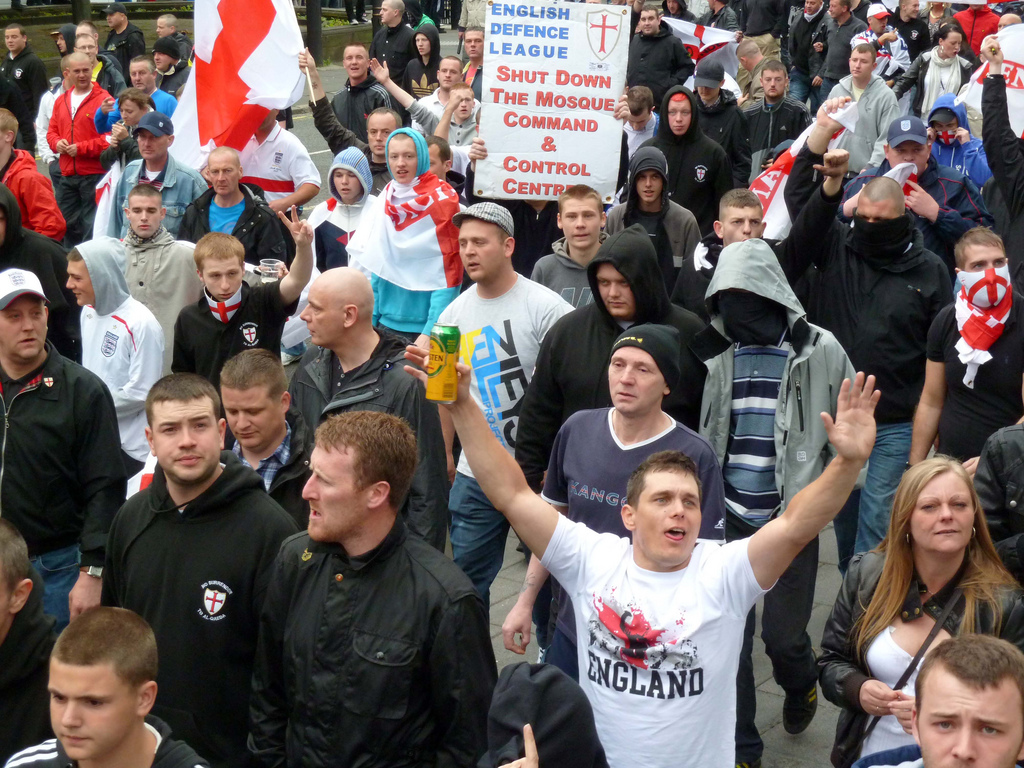
Street protest organised by the EDL in Newcastle, England (The placard reads "Shut down the Mosque Command and Control Centre.")

At demonstrations, speeches typically focused on the perceived threat of Islamification, but also raised issues like the dangers of political correctness and the errors of the political left. EDL demonstrations were typified by continuous chanting with aggressive slogans aimed at Muslims. Pilkington divided these chants into three types: those which were anti-Islam, those which were patriotic in referencing an English identity, and those which were identity affirming in making specific reference to the EDL itself. Alongside chants, the EDL often employed songs, including the UK national anthem "God Save the Queen", patriotic songs like "Keep St George in my Heart, Keep me English"—sung to the tune of the hymn "Give Me Joy in My Heart"—and the anti-Islam themed "There were Ten Muslim Bombers in the Air".

During demonstrations, the EDL regularly faced opposition from anti-fascist groups like Unite Against Fascism, and sometimes also from Islamic groups. The clashes between the rival groups often resulted in violence and public disorder, with the police seeking to keep the two apart. The police and local authorities initially allowed most EDL rallies to take place and did not often request banning orders. In October 2010, West Yorkshire Police successfully requested a government ban on the EDL holding a rally in Bradford, fearing that it would spark violent racial tensions akin to those which had taken place in 2001. In October 2010, the Home Secretary Theresa May granted Leicester Police's request to ban a planned EDL march in that city. By September 2011, over 600 arrests had been made in connection with EDL demonstrations and the policing costs were estimated to have exceeded £10 million. In some cases, most of those arrested were EDL members; in others, most of those arrested were counter-protesters.

==== Mobilising on local issues ====
The EDL sometimes mobilised around local tensions between Islamic and non-Muslim communities, campaigns often organised by local divisions rather than the national leadership. After inebriated Somali women racially assaulted a white woman in Leicester in June 2010, the EDL organised a protest rally there, attributing the attack to the supremacist attitude that Islam supposedly cultivated among its followers. When a white man was assaulted by Asian youths in the Hyde area of Greater Manchester, the EDL again organised a demonstration, blaming the attack on Muslims, although police had not ascertained the perpetrators' religious background. In April 2011, the group demonstrated in Blackburn in response to hit and run incidents where Muslim drivers had hit non-Muslims; the EDL disregarded requests by the victims' families not to politicise the events.

In 2011, the EDL launched a nationwide campaign, "No New Mosques", which built upon earlier campaigns against mosque construction organised by various local divisions. When a mosque was due to be built in West Bridgford, an EDL organiser and three associates placed a severed pig's head at the site, accompanied with the spray-painted slogan "No mosque here EDL Notts". In April 2010, 3,000 EDL demonstrators protested the construction of a new mosque in Dudley. Two months later, EDL members occupied the roof of an abandoned building on the site of the proposed mosque, expressing their intent to play the Islamic call to prayer five times a day to alert locals to the noise pollution they would suffer when the mosque was built. Police swiftly removed the demonstrators.

The EDL was aware that its demonstrations prove costly for local authorities. The Dudley Metropolitan Borough Council for instance stated that policing the 2010 EDL protest had cost over £1 million. To deal with an EDL protest in Leicester, the Leicestershire Police Force put on its largest operation in 25 years, bringing in 2000 police officers to manage the demonstration. The EDL used this leverage to pressurise local councils into agreeing to its demands; in 2010 it issued a letter stating that any local councils that held Winter-themed festivities rather than explicitly Christmas-themed ones could "have their town/city visited by the English Defence League throughout the following year".

=== Violence and relation to football hooliganism ===
Video of damage being caused to a restaurant in Leicester in March 2011. A supporter of the English Defence League was later convicted for his involvement in the attack, and admitted causing criminal damage worth £1500.

The EDL said they disavowed violence. Despite this, many members presented their violence as heroic, acknowledged that they attended rallies because they enjoyed the adrenalin rush brought on by violent confrontation, and saw violent clashes as the best way to draw media attention to their cause. Meadowcroft and Morrow argued that many football hooligans joined the EDL because of the opportunity that its rallies offered for violence at a time when there were decreasing opportunities to do so at football matches themselves due to greater use of banning orders targeting known hooligans, a more effective police presence, and increasing ticket prices that had becoming prohibitively high for those on low incomes.

In various cases, EDL demonstrators damaged Asian-owned businesses and property: in August 2011 an EDL member was convicted for vandalising a mosque, while in October 2011, EDL members stormed and ransacked an Ahmadiyya Islamic bookstore in Sandwell. Demonstrations also led to physical attacks on Asians themselves. Not all targets of EDL violence were Muslim; in a July 2010 demonstration in Dudley, EDL members attacked a Hindu temple. It is unclear whether they mistook it for a mosque or whether it reflected broader prejudices among the demonstrators.

EDL members also disrupted the meetings of opponents; in September 2010 they disrupted a Unite Against Fascism meeting in Leicester, and later that month attacked a Socialist Workers Party meeting in Newcastle-upon-Tyne. EDL members also targeted left-wing bookshops and trade union buildings, and members have been jailed for attacking staff at office buildings hosting anti-EDL meetings. The EDL also targeted demonstrators from the anti-capitalist Occupy movement; in November 2011, 179 EDL members were arrested in central London for threatening members of Occupy London. Journalists that covered EDL marches also received death threats.

==== 2013 Birmingham violent protest ====
EDL supporters were involved in violent protests in Centenary Square, Birmingham, on 20 July 2013. Police were attacked with bottles and other missiles and one officer was injured. Twenty people were detained on the day, with another twenty apprehended by the time a Crimewatch appeal was made in January 2014; the Crimewatch appeal yielded seventy calls from the public. In January 2015, fifty people were sentenced for their involvement, sentences ranged from community orders to jail terms of over three years.

=== Online activism ===
The EDL made significant use of the internet, including an official website and accounts on social media platforms such as Facebook and YouTube. In using social media, the EDL sought to bypass the mainstream media, which it regarded as being biased against it. The EDL hierarchy moderated these social media accounts, blocking users critical of the EDL, but did not appear to remove posts advocating violence towards Muslims. The use of Facebook allowed the group to build momentum and expectancy ahead of public events. The EDL's Facebook following peaked at 100,000 before the Facebook corporation closed the group's account.

Unlike political parties, the EDL did not produce leaflets expressing any political programme or print a magazine or newsletter. The EDL News section of its website published articles, commentary and information on forthcoming events and campaigns, which were then linked to through its social media. The EDL also used its website and eBay to sell branded merchandise, although pulled merchandise from its website in 2010.

=== International and domestic links ===
Despite its many unique features, the EDL is nonetheless representative of a wider political change that has swept across Europe over the past fifteen years. The combination of a deeply anti‐Muslim political agenda and populist ultrapatriotism, powered by grass‐roots critiques of mainstream politics, has been a core component of the 'new far right' in Europe. Unsurprisingly, the EDL has tried to develop connections with other 'new far right' groups on the Continent, while also cultivating links with populist right wing American figures too.

— Historian of the far right Paul Jackson

The EDL formed links with ideologically similar groups internationally, particularly in Europe and the United States. These included sectors of the US Tea Party movement; it affiliated with the US-based Stop Islamization of America run by Pamela Geller and Robert Spencer. Geller served as the EDL's bridge to the Tea Party movement, but later distanced herself from it, stating that the EDL contained neo-Nazi elements. When Moore was head of the EDL's Jewish Division, she established links with a far-right Jewish American group, the Jewish Task Force. In September 2010, EDL representatives joined demonstrations in New York City's Lower Manhattan to protest against the construction of the "Ground Zero Mosque", and in 2012 attended the "Stop Islamization of Nations" conference, again in New York City.

EDL members attended a Berlin rally organised by the Citizens' Movement Pax Europa in April 2010 in support of Geert Wilders, a right-wing, populist politician who had been charged for comparing Islam to Nazism. In June 2010 two EDL representatives attended the Counter-Jihad 2010 conference held by the anti-Muslim International Civil Liberties Alliance in Zurich. In October 2010, Robinson and other EDL members travelled to Amsterdam to protest outside Wilders's trial, although Wilders himself stated that he had no personal contact with the EDL. Here, Robinson announced plans for a "European Friendship Initiative" with the German, Dutch, and French Defence Leagues. In April 2011, Robinson and other EDL representatives attended a small rally in Lyon, alongside the French far-right group Bloc Identitaire; various participants, including Robinson, were arrested. In June 2011, it sent representatives to Pax Europa's counter-jihadist conference in Stuttgart.

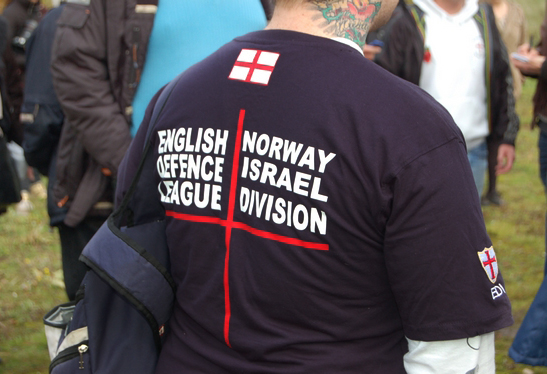
Branded EDL clothing listing the group's links with other organisations abroad

It has partnered with the Welsh Defence League, Scottish Defence League, and Ulster Defence League, none of which had the same success as their English counterpart. The Scottish Defence League retained secret links with the BNP, although in Scotland, it was difficult to bridge sectarian divisions between rival football firms. Sectarianism was also a major issue for the Ulster Defence League, which decided against holding any demonstrations in Northern Ireland itself. The Welsh Defence League faced divisions between its contingent from Swansea, some of whom were former members of Combat 18, and the Casuals United-contingent from Cardiff. After a BBC Wales investigation into the group revealed that a number of its members had neo-Nazi beliefs, in 2011 it was shut down and replaced by the Welsh Casuals.

The EDL also established links to the Danish Defence League, which established 10 chapters within its first year of operation. However recent attempts to establish a presence in Denmark and the Netherlands failed to attract support and were respectively described as "a humiliation" and as "a damp squib". The Norwegian Defence League (NDL) is a sister organisation of the EDL. There are strong connections between the two organisations, and the leadership of the EDL is also actively involved in the leadership of NDL. Members of the NDL have on several occasions travelled to England to participate in EDL protests.

The Australian Defence League (ADL) is an offshoot of the EDL that operates in Australia. However, it operates as a far-right, anti-Islamic street gang that has made terrorist threats, abused, doxxed and stalked Australian Muslims. The group was founded in Sydney in 2009 by Ralph Cerminara and, along with other far-right and anti-Islamic groups, has been involved in many anti-Islamic events in Australia. These include the Bendigo mosque protests against a proposal to build a mosque in Bendigo, Victoria, the distribution of anti-Islamic posters in Sydney and bomb threats against Islamic schools in Sydney. It was also reported that some sailors engaging in Operation Sovereign Borders made anti-Islamic comments, which caused the Royal Australian Navy to launch an investigation into the ADL. The ADL has also been banned from Facebook.

== Membership and support ==
=== Numbers ===
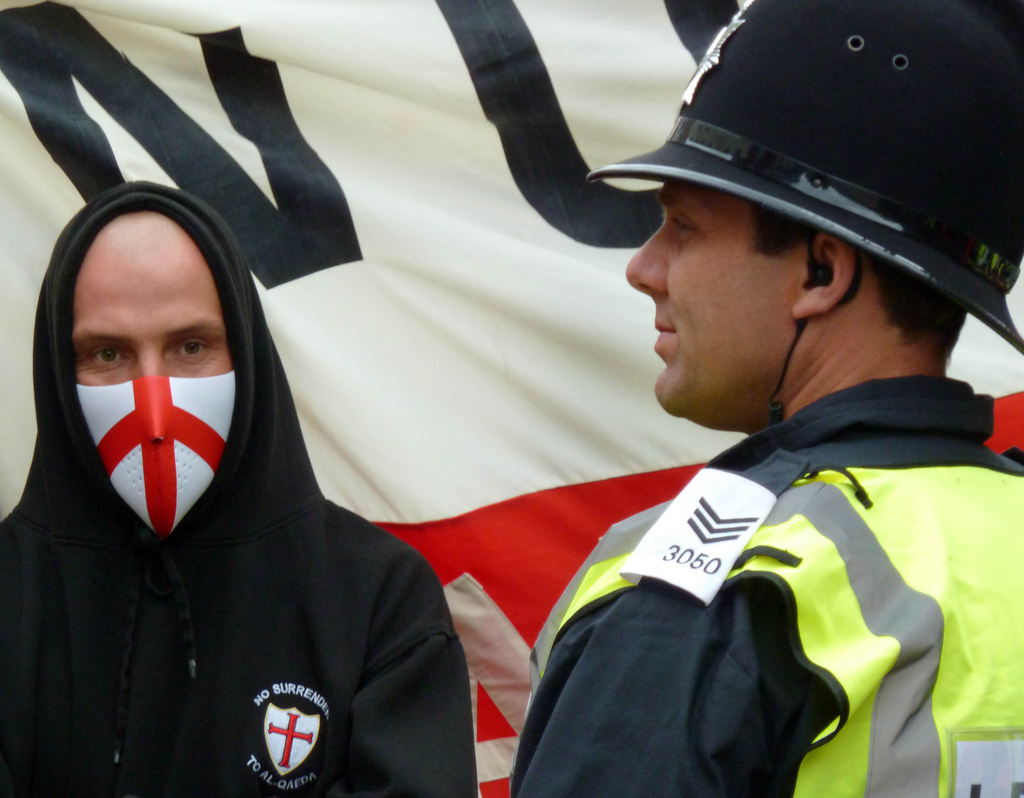
An EDL supporter and a police officer at an EDL march in Newcastle in 2010

The EDL's size was difficult to gauge. It had no official system of membership, and thus no membership list. Pilkington argued that the EDL's active membership, meaning those who attended its rallies and events, peaked between January and April 2010, when national demonstrations could accrue 2000 people, but by the end of that year this had declined to between 800 and 1000. By 2012, the group's national demonstrations were typically only attracting between 300 and 700 people. In 2011, Bartlett and Littler estimated that between 25,000 and 35,000 people were active EDL members, the highest concentration being in Greater London. In July 2010, the EDL had 22,000 Facebook followers; following the 2013 killing of Lee Rigby this reached 160,000, and as of February 2015 had risen further to 184,000. Its Facebook following was smaller than that of its rival, Britain First; in 2015, when the EDL had 181,000 followers, Britain First had 816,000.

Pilkington noted a "high turnover in the movement", while Winlow, Hall and Treadwell observed that members "drift in and out of its activities". Many of the EDL's supporters did not attend its street protests and were called "armchair warriors" by the group. Researchers found many supporters did not attend demonstrations because they feared violence, arrest, and the loss of employment, while many EDL women and older men saw demonstrations as primarily being events for young men. Involvement with the EDL could bring problems for its members which would dissuade their ongoing involvement; these included financial costs, the loss of friends, potential police scrutiny, and the restrictions it placed on their time. Various members described losing friendships and family relationships because of their involvement in the EDL, while others concealed their involvement fearing that they would lose their jobs. Some expressed fears that social services would take their children into care if their EDL membership was known, or that they would be the target of violence from anti-fascists and Muslims.

=== Profile of members ===
Most EDL members were young, working-class, white men. The EDL united three main constituencies: football hooligans, longstanding far-right activists, and a range of socio-economically marginalised people. Copsey noted that "beyond their antagonism towards Islam, there is no ideology that binds this ragbag coalition together", and that the EDL was therefore always susceptible to fracture. For most EDL members, their membership was their first active involvement in a political group.

Once they hit their rhetorical stride, it was common for activists to reach beyond complaints ostensibly focused on Islam and Muslims to a more general lament that ranged across themes including immigration, overcrowded social housing, benefit fraud and, in the months after the English riots of August 2011, the supposed links between 'black culture' and a decline in law and order. They would, however, repeatedly return to the core EDL themes, making clear that where they had strayed from those themes they were 'just my opinions'.

— Political scientist Joel Busher on his fieldwork among the EDL grassroots

On the basis of her ethnographic research among the EDL, Pilkington found that 74% of her respondents were under 35, in contrast to the BNP and UKIP's older support base. 77% were male to 23% female. 51% described themselves as being "White English", and 23% as "White British". Only 6% had either completed or were studying for a higher education degree; 20% never completed secondary education. 49% were unemployed, 20% were in either part-time or irregular employment, and 11% were in full-time employment. 57% lived in social housing, in contrast to 17.5% of the general population. Pilkington found that EDL members had rarely been raised in "stable, strong and protective environments", that accounts of sexual abuse and violence in childhood were somewhat common, and that a number had been raised by grandparents or in foster care. She noted that very few regarded themselves as Christian. Pilkington also found that while all were critical of recent governments, none—barring the few neo-Nazis who attended EDL rallies but did not consider themselves members—desired a more authoritarian government, one-party state, or dictatorship.

In 2011, Bartlett and Littler surveyed 1,295 EDL Facebook supporters: 81% were male to 19% female; only 28% were over the age of thirty, and only 30% had attended either college or university. Bartlett and Littler found that EDL supporters were disproportionately unemployed. The issue that was most important to those surveyed was immigration, which they ranked higher than Islamic extremism. 34% voted for the BNP, 14% for UKIP, 14% for the Conservatives, and 9% for Labour. When asked to rank their three most important personal values, 36% said security, 34% said strong government, 30% said rule of law, and 26% said individual freedom. The surveyed EDL supporters also displayed significantly higher than average levels of distrust in the government, police, and judiciary.

Additional research by Matthew Goodwin, David Cutts, and Laurence Janta-Lupinski drew upon the data gathered by YouGov in an October 2012 survey. This compared 82 people who were members or were interested in joining with 298 "sympathisers" who agreed with the EDL's values but did not wish to join. Their research found "sympathisers" tended to be "older men, have low education levels, are skilled workers, read right-wing tabloid newspapers and support right-wing parties at elections", but that they were not "disproportionately more likely to be unemployed or live in social housing" than the broader population. Conversely, members and those wanting to join displayed "greater financial insecurity" and were more likely than average to be unemployed or in part-time employment, and more likely than average to live in social housing, rely on state benefits, and have no educational qualifications.

==== Members' views ====
The most consistent and emotionally charged narrative of 'self' identified among respondents in this study is that of 'second-class citizen'. This narrative is rooted in a sense of profound injustice based on the perception, almost universally expressed among respondents, that the needs of others are privileged over their own. While the perceived beneficiaries of that injustice might be racialised (as 'immigrants', 'Muslims' or ethnic minorities), and it is claimed that they are afforded preferential treatment in terms of access to benefits, housing and jobs, the agent responsible for this injustice is understood to be a weak-willed or frightened government that panders to the demands of a minority for fear of being labelled racist.

— Ethnographer Hilary Pilkington on her fieldwork among the EDL grassroots

EDL members persistently regarded themselves as second-class citizens. Every EDL member Pilkington encountered believed the British state prioritised the needs of others—especially immigrants and Muslims—over those of themselves and gave ethnic minorities preferential treatment. Various members cited personal experiences where they believed that this had been the case. Members frequently referenced incidents of racial abuse, bullying, violence, and murder against white British people which they felt went under-reported or inappropriately punished. The most cited example was the 2004 murder of Kriss Donald, a racially motivated attack committed by Pakistani men on a white teenager. They also saw this two-tiered system in their perception that ethnic minorities were encouraged to display their own cultural symbols while the white English were not, citing examples in which their display of St George's flag had brought accusations of racism.

Most EDL members whom Busher encountered "had a highly binary interpretation of the world, seeing themselves as engaged in a millennial struggle between good and evil – an existential fight for the future of their country and culture." Busher noted that most activists rarely or never presented this struggle in terms of biological race, even when expressing anti-migrant sentiments. Both Busher and Pilkington encountered EDL members who came to the group from other sectors of the far-right and who claimed their views moderated as a result. Busher suggested that this might be because the EDL ideology's shifted some individual's hostility from being directed at non-white Britons broadly toward Muslims specifically. At the same time, he said that as the EDL fragmented, members of some of its splinter groups adopted increasingly extreme views.

EDL members usually rejected the description of them being "far-right", or "racist". They often placed great importance on being working-class and displayed clear bonds with their local communities. Many came from families who were Labour voters and sometimes trade unionists, but also expressed anger at Labour, regarding it as the party of multiculturalism, political correctness, and mass immigration. Among EDL members, there was much talk of "stupid lefties" who were believed to hate the white working class.

==== Causal factors ====
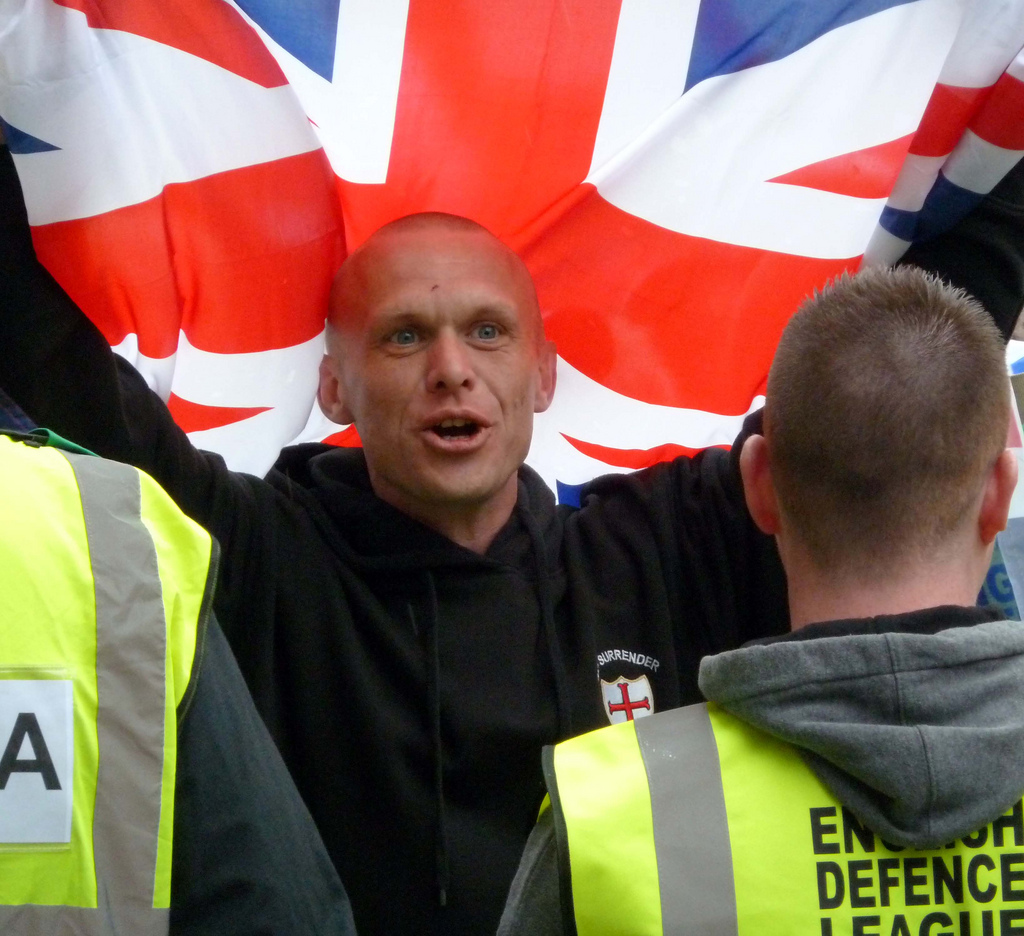
A participant in an EDL rally in Newcastle in 2010, carrying the Union Jack flag

Meadowcroft and Morrow suggested that the EDL overcame the collective action problem by offering its members "access to violent conflict, increased self-worth and group solidarity". They argued that for many working-class young men with "little meaning or cause for pride" in their lives, EDL membership allowed them to "reimagine" themselves as "heroic freedom fighters" battling to save their nation from its fundamental enemy, Islam, "thereby bolstering their sense of self-worth." They also argued that EDL membership gave individuals a sense of group identity and community which was otherwise lacking.

Winlow, Hall, and Treadwell argued that the EDL's growth among the white working-class reflected how this sector of society—which had predominantly aligned with the political left during the 20th century—was increasingly shifting to the far-right in the early 21st. These sociologists attributed this to changes within the mainstream British left since the 1990s: following the 1991 dissolution of the Soviet Union, Britain's mainstream left had ceased talking about regulating capitalism, Tony Blair's New Labour project had shifted Labour's focus from its traditional working-class base towards middle-class swing voters, and middle-class leftist politicians were increasingly regarding white working-class cultural values as an embarrassment. Britain's white working classes increasingly believed that public policy favoured minorities—LGBT people, ethnic, and religious minorities—through affirmative action employment, drives to "diversify" workforces, and favourable media coverage. They also thought that the state had encouraged these groups to present themselves as victims. EDL supporters believed that the heterosexual white working class were left as the only cultural group without vocal political representation.

These sociologists argued that economic shifts had seen traditional working-class jobs increasingly replaced by low-grade service sector jobs, often non-unionised and on zero hour contracts; EDL members were aware of this, believing that their parents and grandparents' generations had had a better quality of life. According to Winlow, Hall and Treadwell, it was the resulting "background of broadly felt anger and frustration" among the white working class, a "sense of disempowerment, abandonment and growing irrelevance", from which the EDL developed. The EDL provided these working-class individuals with "a very basic means of understanding their frustrations", blaming their economic insecurity and sense of cultural marginalisation on Muslims and immigrants.

== Reception and impact ==
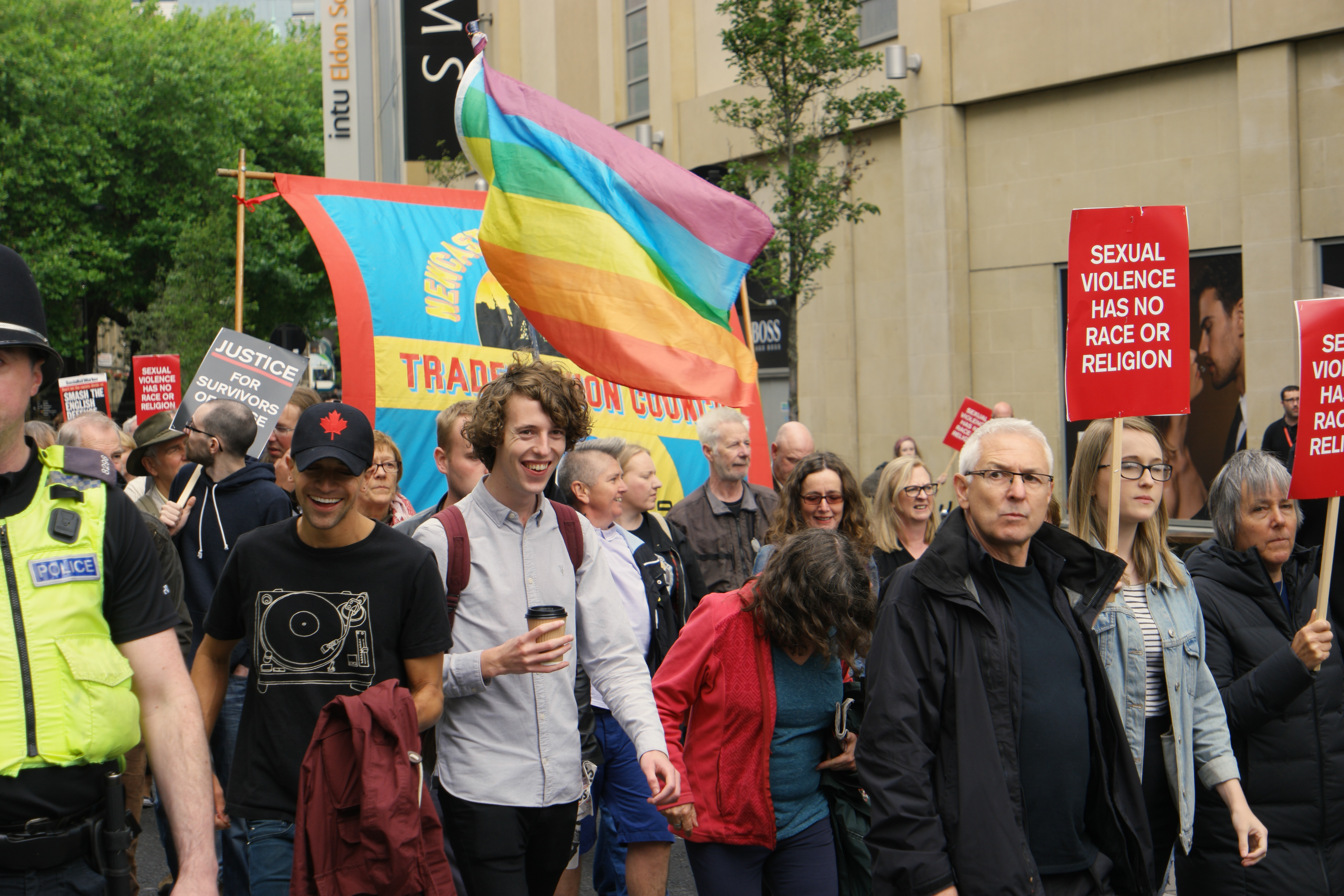
Counter-protest to the EDL organised by the Unite trade union, held in Newcastle in 2017

The EDL represented "the biggest populist street movement in a generation" in Britain, reviving a tradition of far-right street protest that had been largely dormant during the 2000s. The political scientists Matthew J. Goodwin, David Cutts, and Laurence Janta-Lipinski suggested that from 2009 to 2013, it represented "the most significant anti-Islam movement in Europe". In 2011, James Treadwell and Jon Garland described the EDL as "one of the most notable political developments of the past few years", while in 2013, the political scientist Julian Richards stated that the EDL had been "one of the more intriguing developments on the Far Right in recent years".

Although the majority of the British population did not share all of the EDL's views on Islam, the group's rhetoric resonated with and fed into broader animosity towards Muslims in British society. The 2010 British Social Attitudes Survey found that 55% would be bothered by having a mosque built in their street, while a 2011 survey found 48% of UK citizens agreeing with the statement that Islam was "a religion of intolerance". Various commentators attributed this sentiment to elements of the tabloid media, such as the Daily Mail, The Sun, and the Daily Star. The EDL itself faced derision from much of the mainstream media, with EDL members expressing anger at how they felt the mainstream media misrepresented them by, for instance, interviewing those members at demonstrations who were evidently drunk or inarticulate. Those outside the EDL typically perceived the group as being fascist, racist, or mindlessly violent. A 2012 poll by Extremis and YouGov found that only a third of those surveyed had heard of the EDL, and that of those who had, only 11% would consider joining. Of that third, 74% considered the group racist.

=== Opposition ===
The government regarded the EDL as a major threat to societal cohesion and integration, and there were fears that the group sought to spark racially aggravated urban disturbances similar to those of 2001. In 2009, the UK Communities Secretary John Denham condemned the EDL and compared its tactics to those used by the British Union of Fascists in the 1930s. In 2010, the Conservative Party leader—and subsequent Prime Minister—David Cameron described the EDL as "terrible people", adding that "if we needed to ban them, we would". Later that year, it rejected calls to ban the group; as the EDL did not openly glorify terrorism it could not be proscribed under Britain's counter-terrorism legislation. Police reported that EDL activities hampered their own counter-terror operations among British Muslim communities.

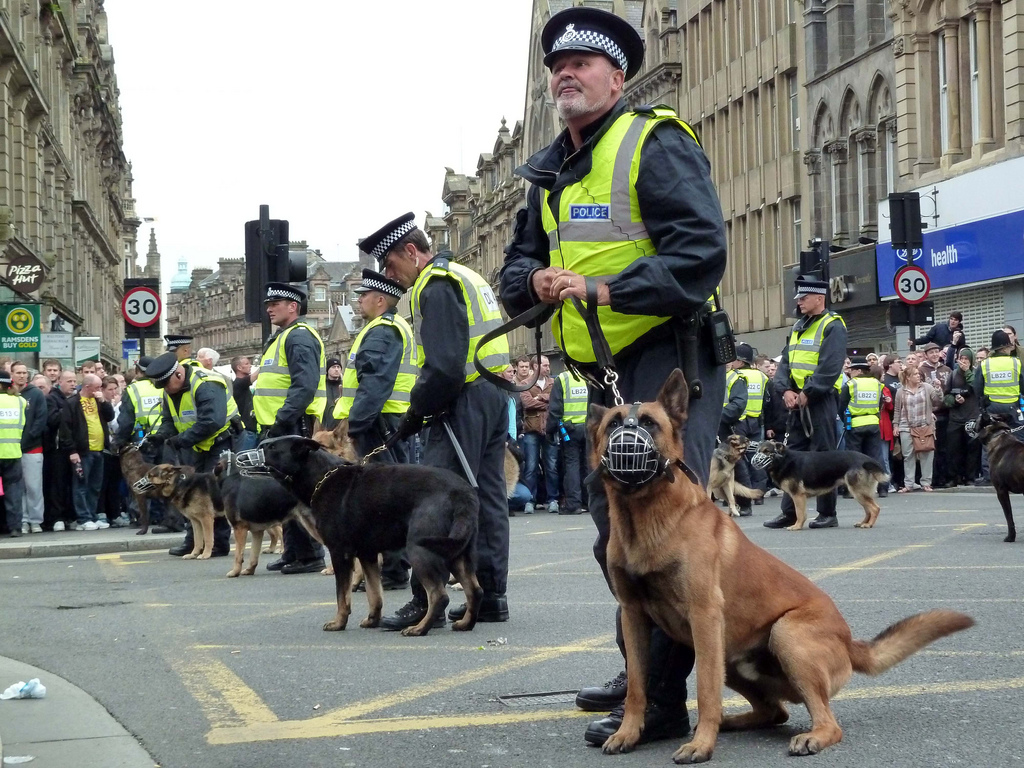
Police with police dogs in attendance at an EDL demonstration in Newcastle in 2010

Foremost among the counter-protesters at EDL events was Unite Against Fascism (UAF), who mirrored the tactics used by the Anti-Nazi League in the 1970s. Dominated by the Socialist Workers Party, the UAF had a largely Marxist interpretation of the EDL. The UAF believed in opposing the EDL at every juncture so as to demoralise its members; the UAF's common chant was "Fascist scum off our streets". Political scientists said that this confrontational approach gave the EDL exactly what it wanted, and that it could contribute to further radicalisation on all sides.

Another anti-fascist group, Hope not Hate, did not believe every EDL rally must meet forceful opposition. It argued that anti-fascists should adapt their tactics to the wishes of local community members in a given area, and emphasised bringing together different religious and ethnic groups in peaceful protest. Hope not Hate also foregrounded the need to establish long-term strategies to counter the EDL and far-right, focusing on reconnecting disenfranchised people with the established political process. Online, various leftist websites played a role in monitoring the EDL's activities.

Britain's Muslims were divided on how to respond to the EDL; some Muslims joined UAF counter-protests, although other Islamic voices called for Muslims to avoid the protests altogether. Another response was the formation of the Muslim Defence League in 2010, the stated purpose of which was to oppose Islamophobia and counter misinformation about Islam. In various instances, it supported UAF counter-protests. In 2013, six Islamists pleaded guilty to plotting a bomb and gun attack on an EDL march in Dewsbury. Other religious communities also responded to the EDL. A group called Sikhs Against the EDL was formed in response to the involvement of some Sikhs in the organisation, while the Board of Deputies of British Jews expressed disappointment at the formation of the EDL Jewish Division.
