= Cultural racism =

Alleged type of racism that discriminates people for being culturally different

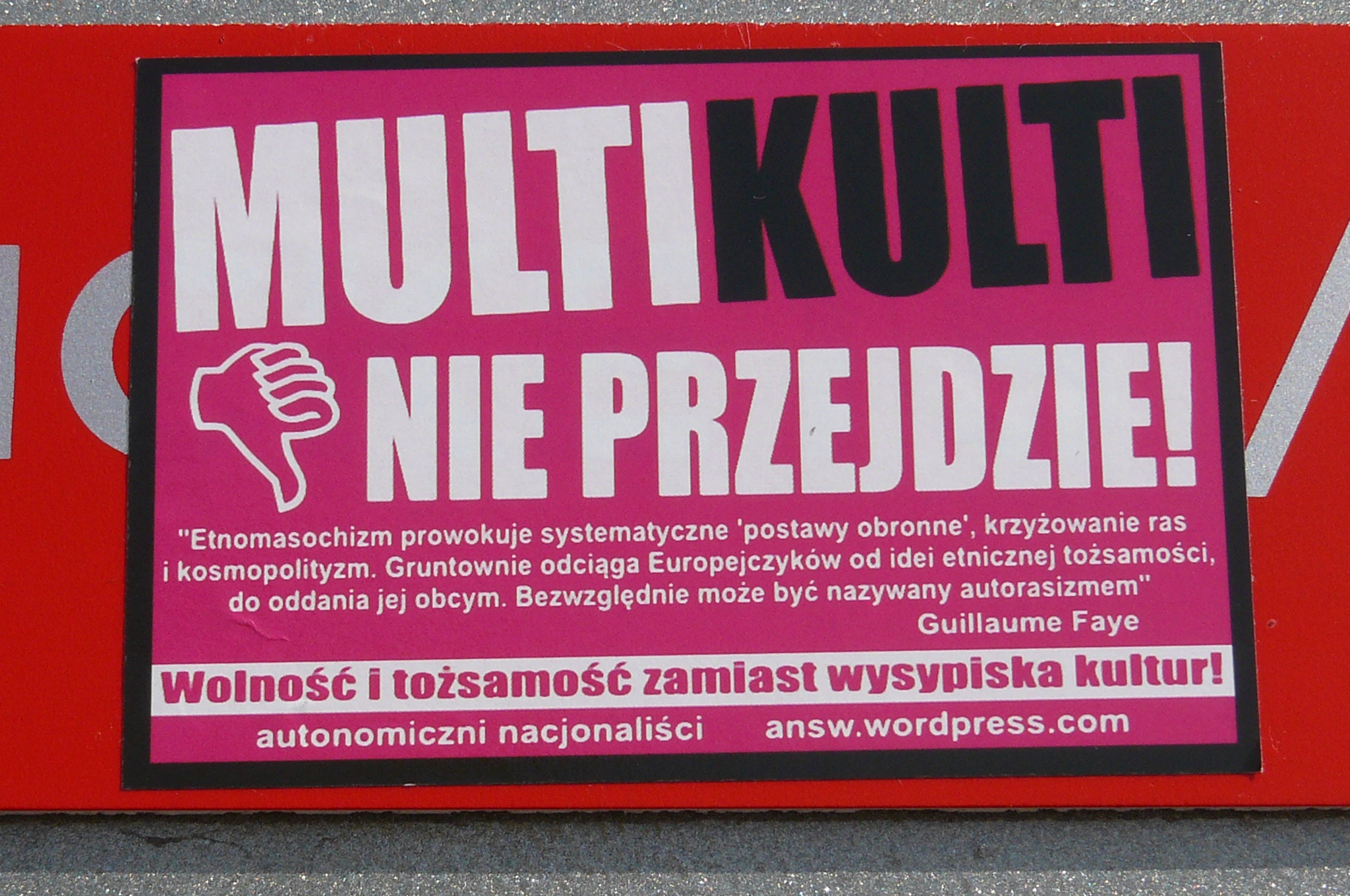
A sticker in Wrocław expressing opposition to multiculturalism, the idea that people of different cultures can reside in the same state ("multiculti will not pass!"), along with a quote from Nouvelle Droite leader Guillaume Faye; (Note: Translation of the quote: "Ethnomasochism provokes systematic 'defences', a hybridization of races and cosmopolitanism. It fundamentally deprives Europeans of their ethnic identity, to give it back to others. It can undoubtedly be called auto-racism." [Original French: L'ethnomasochisme provoque des 'défenses' systématiques, une hibrydisation des races et le cosmopolitisme. Il prive les européens fondamentalement de leur identité ethnique, pour la rendre aux autres. Sans aucun doute on peut appeler cela l'auto-racisme.]) this stance is described by some theorists as "cultural racism".

Cultural racism (Note: Also known as neo-racism, new racism, postmodern racism, or differentialist racism.) is a concept that has been applied to prejudices and discrimination based on cultural differences between ethnic or racial groups. This includes the idea that some cultures are superior to others or in more extreme cases that various cultures are fundamentally incompatible and should not co-exist in the same society or state. In this it differs from biological or scientific racism, which refers to prejudices and discrimination rooted in perceived biological differences between ethnic or racial groups.

The concept of cultural racism was developed in the 1980s and 1990s by West European scholars such as Martin Barker, Étienne Balibar, and Pierre-André Taguieff. These theorists argued that the hostility to immigrants then evident in Western countries should be labelled racism, a term that had been used to describe discrimination on the grounds of perceived biological race since the early 20th century. They argued that while biological racism had become increasingly unpopular in Western societies during the second half of the 20th century, it had been replaced by a new, cultural racism that relied on a belief in intrinsic and insurmountable cultural differences instead. They noted that this change was being promoted by far-right movements such as the French Nouvelle Droite.

Three main arguments as to why beliefs in intrinsic and insurmountable cultural differences should be considered racist have been put forward. One is that hostility on a cultural basis can result in the same discriminatory and harmful practices as belief in intrinsic biological differences, such as exploitation, oppression, or extermination. The second is that beliefs in biological and cultural difference are often interlinked and that biological racists use claims of cultural difference to promote their ideas in contexts where biological racism is considered socially unacceptable. The third argument is that the idea of cultural racism recognizes that in many societies, groups like immigrants and Muslims have undergone racialization, coming to be seen as distinct social groups separate from the majority on the basis of their cultural traits. Influenced by critical pedagogy, those calling for the eradication of cultural racism in Western countries have largely argued that this should be done by promoting multicultural education and anti-racism through schools and universities.

The utility of the concept has been debated. Some scholars have argued that prejudices and hostility based on culture are sufficiently different from biological racism that it is not appropriate to use the term racism for both. According to this view, incorporating cultural prejudices into the concept of racism expands the latter too much and weakens its utility. Among scholars who have used the concept of cultural racism, there have been debates as to its scope. Some scholars have argued that Islamophobia should be considered a form of cultural racism. Others have disagreed, arguing that while cultural racism pertains to visible symbols of difference like clothing, cuisine, and language, Islamophobia primarily pertains to hostility on the basis of someone's religious beliefs.

== Concept ==
The concept of "cultural racism" has been given various names, particularly as it was being developed by academic theorists in the 1980s and early 1990s. The British scholar of media studies and cultural studies Martin Barker termed it the "new racism", whereas the French philosopher Étienne Balibar favoured "neo-racism", and later "cultural-differential racism". Another French philosopher, Pierre-André Taguieff, used the term "differentialist racism", while a similar term used in the literature has been "the racism of cultural difference". The Spanish sociologist Ramón Flecha instead used the term "postmodern racism".

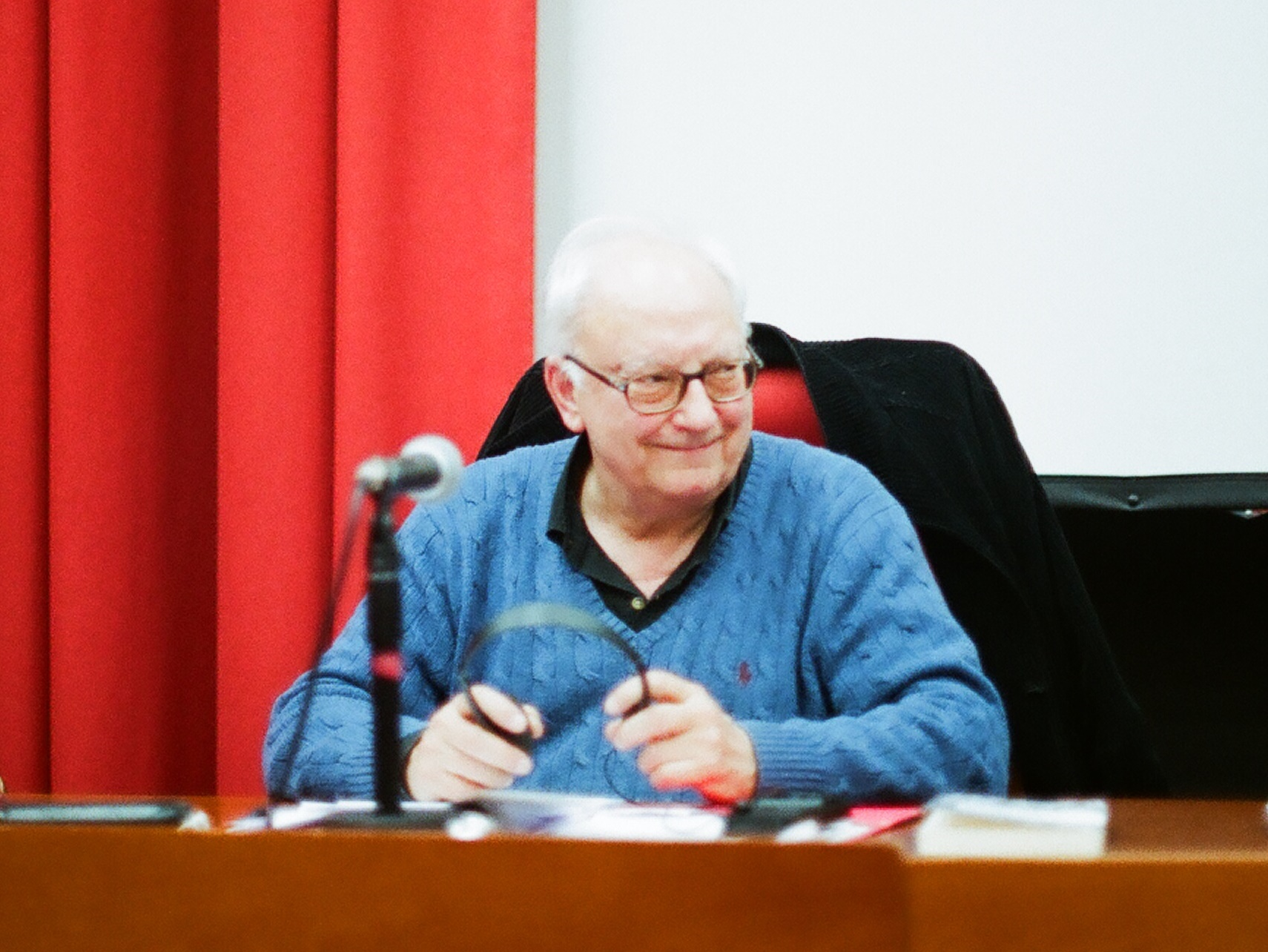
Étienne Balibar's concept of "neo-racism" was an early formulation of what later became widely termed "cultural racism".

The term "racism" is one of the most controversial and ambiguous words used within the social sciences. Balibar characterised it as a concept plagued by "extreme tension" as well as "extreme confusion". This academic usage is complicated by the fact that the word is also common in popular discourse, often as a term of "political abuse"; many of those who term themselves "anti-racists" use the term "racism" in a highly generalised and indeterminate way.

The word "racisme" was used in the French language by the late 19th century, where French nationalists employed it to describe themselves and their belief in the inherent superiority of the French people over other groups. The earliest recorded use of the term "racism" in the English language dates from 1902, and for the first half of the 20th century the word was used interchangeably with the term "racialism". According to Taguieff, up until the 1980s, the term "racism" was typically used to describe "essentially a theory of races, the latter distinct and unequal, defined in biological terms and in eternal conflict for the domination of the earth".

The popularisation of the term "racism" in Western countries came later, when "racism" was increasingly used to describe the antisemitic policies enacted in Nazi Germany during the 1930s and 1940s. These policies were rooted in the Nazi government's belief that Jews constituted a biologically distinct race that was separate from the Aryan race to which the Nazis believed authentic Germans belonged. The term was further popularised in the 1950s and 1960s amid the civil rights movement's campaign to end racial inequalities in the United States. Following the Second World War, when Nazi Germany was defeated and biologists developed the science of genetics, the idea that the human species sub-divided into biologically distinct races began to decline. At this, anti-racists declared that the scientific validity behind racism had been discredited.

From the 1980s onward, there was considerable debate—particularly in Britain, France, and the United States—about the relationship between biological racism and prejudices rooted in cultural difference. By this point, most scholars of cultural racism rejected the idea that there are biologically distinct races, arguing that "race" is a culturally constructed concept. These academic theorists argued that the hostility to migrants evident in Western Europe during the latter decades of the twentieth century should be regarded as "racism" but recognised that it was different from historical phenomena commonly called "racism", such as racial antisemitism or European colonialism. They therefore argued that while historic forms of racism were rooted in ideas of biological difference, the new "racism" was rooted in beliefs about different groups being culturally incompatible with each other.

=== Definitions ===
An important characteristic of the so-called 'new racism', 'cultural racism' or 'differential racism' is the fact that it essentialises ethnicity and religion, and traps people in supposedly immutable reference categories, as if they are incapable of adapting to a new reality or changing their identity. By these means cultural racism treats the 'other culture' as a threat that might contaminate the dominant culture and its internal coherence. Such a view is clearly based on the assumption that certain groups are the genuine carriers of the national culture and the exclusive heirs of their history while others are potential slayers of its 'purity'.

— Sociologist Uri Ben-Eliezer, 2004

Not all scholars that have used the concept of "cultural racism" have done so in the same way. The scholars Carol C. Mukhopadhyay and Peter Chua defined "cultural racism" as "a form of racism (that is, a structurally unequal practice) that relies on cultural differences rather than on biological markers of racial superiority or inferiority. The cultural differences can be real, imagined, or constructed". Elsewhere, in The Wiley‐Blackwell Encyclopedia of Social Theory, Chua defined cultural racism as "the institutional domination and sense of racial‐ethnic superiority of one social group over others, justified by and based on allusively constructed markers, instead of outdated biologically ascribed distinctions".

Balibar linked what he called "neo-racism" to the process of decolonization, arguing that while older, biological racisms were employed when European countries were engaged in colonising other parts of the world, the new racism was linked to the rise of non-European migration into Europe in the decades following the Second World War. He argued that "neo-racism" replaced "the notion of race" with "the category of immigration", and in this way produced a "racism without races". Balibar described this racism as having as its dominant theme not biological heredity, "but the insurmountability of cultural differences, a racism which, at first sight, does not postulate the superiority of certain groups or peoples in relation to others but 'only' the harmfulness of abolishing frontiers, the incompatibility of lifestyles and traditions". He nevertheless thought that cultural racism's claims that different cultures are equal was "more apparent than real" and that when put into practice, cultural racist ideas reveal that they inherently rely on a belief that some cultures are superior to others.

Drawing on developments in French culture during the 1980s, Taguieff drew a distinction between "imperialist/colonialist racism", which he also called the "racism of assimilation", and "differentialist/mixophobic racism", which he also termed "the racism of exclusion". Taguieff suggested that this latter phenomenon differed from its predecessor by talking about "ethnicity/culture" rather than "race", by promoting notions of "difference" in place of "inequality", and by presenting itself as a champion of "heterophilia", the love of difference, rather than "heterophobia", the fear of difference. In this, he argued that it engaged in what he called "mixophobia", the fear of cultural mixing, and linked in closely with nationalism.

The geographer Karen Wren defined cultural racism as "a theory of human nature where humans are considered equal, but where cultural differences make it natural for nation states to form closed communities, as relations between different cultures are essentially hostile". She added that cultural racism stereotypes ethnic groups, treats cultures as fixed entities, and rejects ideas of cultural hybridity. Wren argued that nationalism, and the idea that there is a nation-state to which foreigners do not belong, is "essential" to cultural racism. She noted that "cultural racism relies on the closure of culture by territory and the idea that 'foreigners' should not share the 'national' resources, particularly if they are under threat of scarcity."

The sociologist Ramón Grosfoguel noted that "cultural racism assumes that the metropolitan culture is different from ethnic minorities' culture" while simultaneously taking on the view that minorities fail to "understand the cultural norms" that are dominant in a given country. Grosfoguel also noted that cultural racism relies on a belief that separate cultural groups are so different that they "cannot get along". In addition, he argued that cultural racist views hold that any widespread poverty or unemployment faced by an ethnic minority arises from that minority's own "cultural values and behavior" rather than from broader systems of discrimination within the society it inhabits. In this way, Grosfoguel argued, cultural racism encompasses attempts by dominant communities to claim that marginalised communities are at fault for their own problems.

==== Alternative definitions of "cultural racism" ====
As a term more common in the European literature, "cultural racism" has had less of an impact in the United States. Referring specifically to the situation in the U.S., the psychologist Janet Helms defined cultural racism as "societal beliefs and customs that promote the assumption that the products of White culture (e.g., language, traditions, appearance) are superior to those of non-White cultures". She identified it as one of three forms of racism, alongside personal racism and institutional racism. Again using a U.S.-centric definition, the psychologist James M. Jones noted that a belief in the "cultural inferiority" both of Native Americans and African Americans had long persisted in U.S. culture, and that this was often connected to beliefs that said groups were biologically inferior to European Americans. In Jones' view, when individuals reject a belief in biological race, notions regarding the relative cultural inferiority and superiority of different groups can remain, and that "cultural racism remains as a residue of expunged biological racism." Offering a very different definition, the scholar of multicultural education Robin DiAngelo used the term "cultural racism" to define "the racism deeply embedded in the culture and thus always in circulation. Cultural racism keeps our racist socialization alive and continually reinforced."

=== Cultural prejudices as racism ===
Theorists have put forward three main arguments as to why they deem the term "racism" appropriate for hostility and prejudice on the basis of cultural differences. The first is the argument that a belief in fundamental cultural differences between human groups can lead to the same harmful acts as a belief in fundamental biological differences, namely exploitation and oppression or exclusion and extermination. As the academics Hans Siebers and Marjolein H. J. Dennissen noted, this claim has yet to be empirically demonstrated.

The second argument is that ideas of biological and cultural difference are intimately linked. Various scholars have argued that racist discourses often emphasise both biological and cultural difference at the same time. Others have argued that racist groups have often moved toward publicly emphasising cultural differences because of growing social disapproval of biological racism and that it represents a switch in tactics rather than a fundamental change in underlying racist belief. The third argument is the "racism-without-race" approach. This holds that categories like "migrants" and "Muslims" have—despite not representing biologically united groups—undergone a process of "racialization" in that they have come to be regarded as unitary groups on the basis of shared cultural traits.

=== Critiques ===
Several academics have critiqued the use of cultural racism to describe prejudices and discrimination on the basis of cultural difference. Those who reserve the term racism for biological racism for instance do not believe that cultural racism is a useful or appropriate concept. The sociologist Ali Rattansi asked the question whether cultural racism could be seen to stretch the notion of racism "to a point where it becomes too wide to be useful as anything but a rhetorical ploy?" He suggested that beliefs which insist that group identification require the adoption of cultural traits such as specific dress, language, custom, and religion might better be termed ethnicism or ethnocentrism and that when these also incorporate hostility to foreigners they may be described as bordering on xenophobia. He does however acknowledge that "it is possible to talk of ‘cultural racism’ despite the fact that strictly speaking modern ideas of race have always had one or other biological foundation." The critique "misses the point that generalizations, stereotypes, and other forms of cultural essentialism rest and draw upon a wider reservoir of concepts that are in circulation in popular and public culture. Thus, the racist elements of any particular proposition can only be judged by understanding the general context of public and private discourses in which ethnicity, national identifications, and race coexist in blurred and overlapping forms without clear demarcations."

[C]an a combination of religious and other cultural antipathy be described as 'racist'? Is this not to rob the idea of racism of any analytical specificity and open the floodgates to a conceptual inflation that simply undermines the legitimacy of the idea?

— Sociologist Ali Rattansi, 2007

Similarly, Siebers and Dennissen questioned whether bringing "together the exclusion/oppression of groups as different as current migrants in Europe, Afro-Americans and Latinos in the US, Jews in the Holocaust and in the Spanish Reconquista, slaves and indigenous peoples in the Spanish Conquista and so on into the concept of racism, irrespective of justifications, does the concept not run the risk of losing in historical precision and pertinence what it gains in universality?" They suggested that in attempting to develop a concept of "racism" that could be applied universally, exponents of the "cultural racism" idea risked undermining the "historicity and contextuality" of specific prejudices. In analysing the prejudices faced by Moroccan-Dutch people in the Netherlands during the 2010s, Siebers and Dennissen argued that these individuals' experiences were very different both from those encountered by Dutch Jews in the first half of the 20th century and colonial subjects in the Dutch East Indies. Accordingly, they argued that concepts of "cultural essentialism" and "cultural fundamentalism" were far better ways of explaining hostility to migrants than that of "racism".

Barker's notion of the "new racism" was critiqued by the sociologists Robert Miles and Malcolm Brown. They thought it problematic because it relied on defining racism not as a system based on the belief in the superiority and inferiority of different groups, but as encompassing any ideas that saw a culturally defined group as a biological entity. Thus, Miles and Brown argued, Barker's "new racism" relied on a definition of racism which eliminated any distinctions between that concept and others such as nationalism and sexism. The sociologist Floya Anthias critiqued early ideas of the "neo-racism" for failing to provide explanations for prejudices and discrimination towards groups like the Black British, who shared a common culture with the dominant White British population. She also argued that the framework failed to take into account positive images of ethnic and cultural minorities, for instance in the way that British Caribbean culture had often been depicted positively in British youth culture. In addition, she suggested that, despite its emphasis on culture, early work on "neo-racism" still betrayed its focus on biological differences by devoting its attention to black people—however defined—and neglecting the experiences of lighter-skinned ethnic minorities in Britain, such as Jews, Romanis, the Irish, and Cypriots.

== Cultural racism in Western countries ==
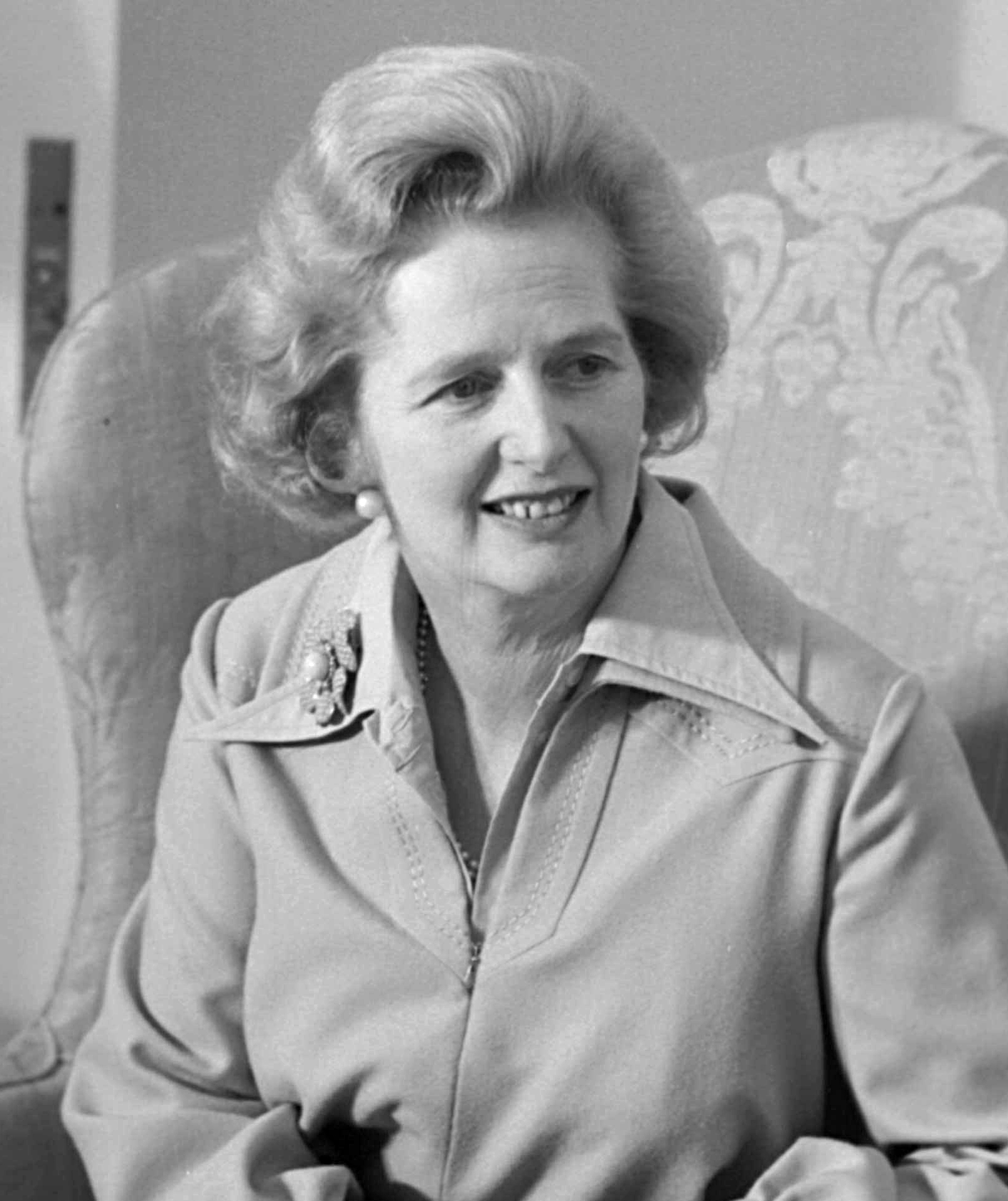
Margaret Thatcher's 1978 claim that Britain was being "swamped by people with a different culture" has been cited as an example of cultural racism.

In a 1992 article for Antipode: A Radical Journal of Geography, the geographer James Morris Blaut argued that in Western contexts, cultural racism replaces the biological concept of the "white race" with that of the "European" as a cultural entity. This argument was subsequently supported by Wren. Blaut argued that cultural racism had encouraged many white Westerners to view themselves not as members of a superior race, but of a superior culture, referred to as "European culture", "Western culture", or "the West". He proposed that culturally racist ideas were developed in the wake of the Second World War by Western academics who were tasked with rationalising the white Western dominance both of communities of colour in Western nations and the Third World. He argued that the sociological concept of modernization was developed to promote the culturally racist idea that the Western powers were wealthier and more economically developed because they were more culturally advanced.

Wren argued that cultural racism had manifested in a largely similar way throughout Europe, but with specific variations in different places according to the established ideas of national identity and the form and timing of immigration. She argued that Western societies used the discourse of cultural difference as a form of Othering through which they justify the exclusion of various ethnic or cultural 'others', while at the same time ignoring socio-economic inequalities between different ethnic groups. Using Denmark as an example, she argued that a "culturally racist discourse" had emerged during the 1980s, a time of heightened economic tension and unemployment. Based on fieldwork in the country during 1995, she argued that cultural racism had encouraged anti-immigration sentiment throughout Danish society and generated "various forms of racist practice", including housing quotas that restrict the number of ethnic minorities to around 10%. Furthermore, Dinesh D'Souza spoke about racism being so deeply embedded in "Western consciousness" that it cannot be eradicated, as it is now seen as a 'norm' in western behaviours due to cultural teachings being passed down through generations. However, he mainly based his argument on ethnocentrism being mistaken for racism in Western societies which he believed we often misinterpreted as being racist, his thesis was that early European racists were misunderstood as their views was a way of them trying to "make sense of the diverse world" in other words, they did not understand the culture as it did not match their own, as a result they tried to implement their own.

Wren compared anti-immigrant sentiment in 1990s Denmark to the Thatcherite anti-immigrant sentiment expressed in 1980s Britain. Margaret Thatcher, then Leader of the Opposition, for instance was considered a cultural racist for comments in which she expressed concern about Britain becoming "swamped by people with a different culture". The term has also been used in Turkey. In 2016, Germany's European Commissioner Guenther Oettinger stated that it was unlikely that Turkey would be permitted to join the European Union while Recep Tayyip Erdoğan remained the Turkish President. In response, Turkey's European Union Affairs Minister Omer Celik accused Germany of "cultural racism".

The sociologist Xolela Mangcu argued that cultural racism could be seen as a contributing factor in the construction of apartheid, a system of racial segregation that privileged whites, in South Africa during the latter 1940s. He noted that the Dutch-born South African politician Hendrik Verwoerd, a prominent figure in establishing the apartheid system, had argued in favour of separating racial groups on the grounds of cultural difference. The idea of cultural racism has also been used to explain phenomena in the United States. Grosfoguel argued that cultural racism replaced biological racism in the U.S. amid the 1960s civil rights movement. Clare Sheridan stated that cultural racism was an applicable concept to the experiences of Mexican Americans, with various European Americans taking the view that they were not truly American because they spoke Spanish rather than English. The Clash of Civilizations theory, put forward in the 1990s by the American theorist Samuel P. Huntington, has also been cited as a stimulus to cultural racism for its argument that the world is divided up into mutually exclusive cultural blocs.

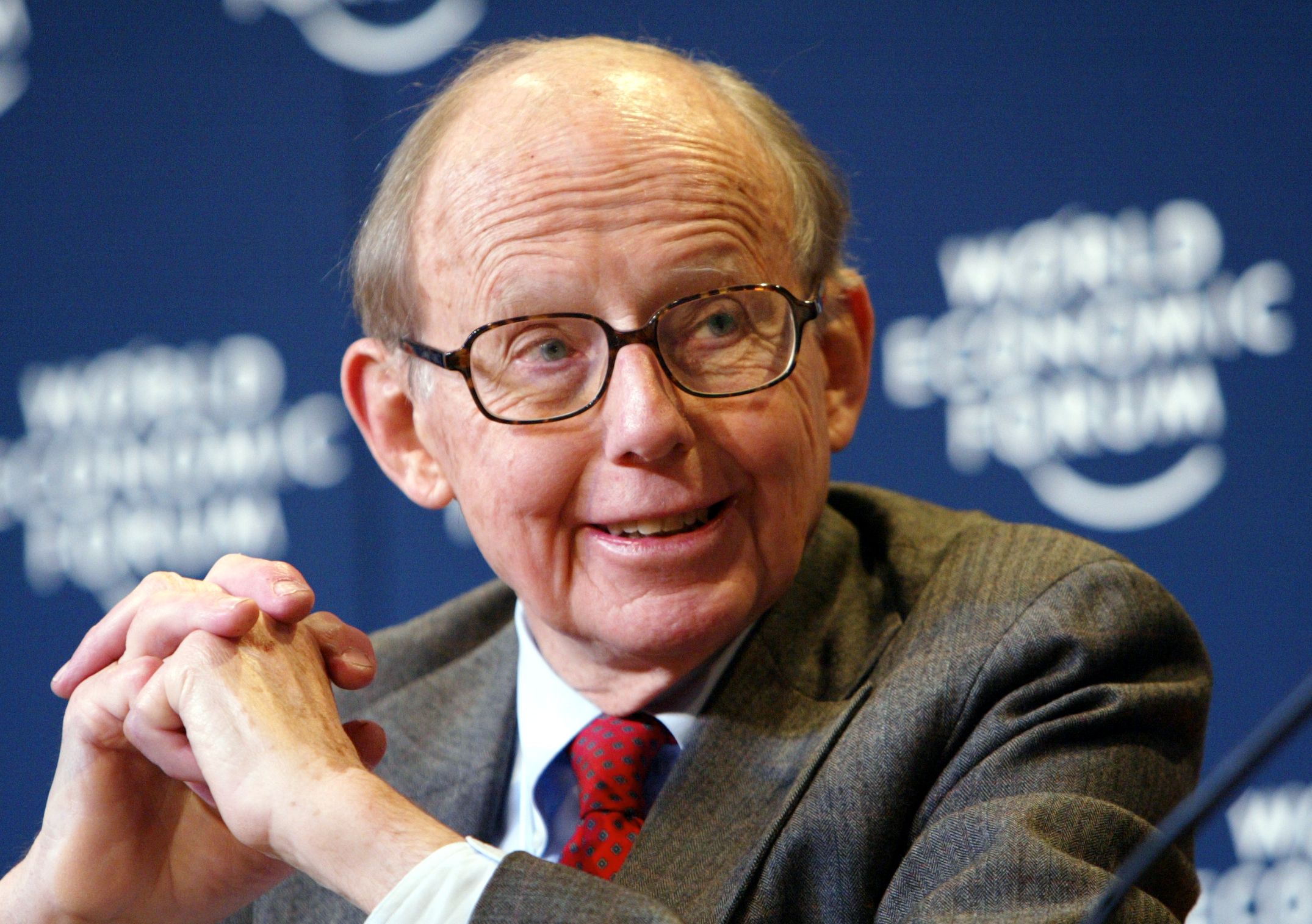
The Clash of Civilizations theory put forward by American political scientist Samuel P. Huntington has been described as a stimulus to cultural racism.

In the early 1990s, the scholar of critical pedagogy Henry Giroux argued that cultural racism was evident across the political right in the United States. In his view, conservatives were "reappropriating progressive critiques of race, ethnicity and identity and using them to promote rather than dispel a politics of cultural racism". For Giroux, the conservative administration of President George H. W. Bush acknowledged the presence of racial and ethnic diversity in the U.S., but presented it as a threat to national unity. Drawing on Giroux's work, the scholar of critical pedagogy Rebecca Powell suggested that both the conservative and liberal wings of U.S. politics reflected a culturally racist stance in that both treated European American culture as normative. She argued that while European American liberals acknowledge the existence of institutional racism, their encouragement of cultural assimilationism betrays an underlying belief in the superiority of European American culture over that of non-white groups.

The scholar Uri Ben-Eliezer argued that the concept of cultural racism was useful for understanding the experience of Ethiopian Jews living in Israel. After the Ethiopian Jews began migrating to Israel in the 1980s, various young members were sent to boarding school with the intention of assimilating them into mainstream Israeli culture and distancing them from their parental culture. The newcomers found that many Israelis, especially Ashkenazis who adhered to ultra-orthodox interpretations of Judaism, did not regard them as real Jews. When some white Israeli parents removed their children from schools with a high percentage of Ethiopian children, they denied accusations of racism, with one stating: "It's only a matter of cultural differences, we have nothing against blacks".

In 1992, Blaut argued that while most academics totally rejected biological racism, cultural racism was widespread within academia. Similarly, in 2000 Powell suggested that cultural racism underpinned many of the policies and decisions made by U.S. educational institutions, although often on an "unconscious level". She argued that the U.S. curriculum was based on the premise that "White cultural knowledge" was superior to that of other ethnic groups, hence why it was taught in Standard English, the literature studied was largely Eurocentric, and history lessons focused on the doings of Europeans and people of European descent.

=== Among the far-right ===
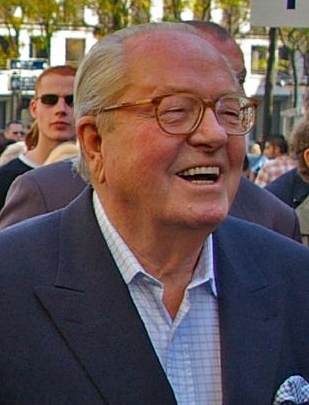
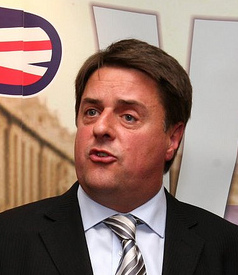
In Western Europe, far-right politicians like Jean-Marie Le Pen (left) and Nick Griffin (right) downplayed their parties' biologically racist positions to argue for the incompatibility of different cultural groups.

The scholar of English Daniel Wollenberg stated that in the latter part of the 20th century and early decades of the 21st, many in the European far-right began to distance themselves from the biological racism that characterised neo-Nazi and neo-fascist groups and instead emphasised "culture and heritage" as the "key factors in constructing communal identity".

The previous political failures of the domestic terrorist group Organisation Armée Secrète during the Algerian War (1954–62), along with the electoral defeat of far-right candidate Jean-Louis Tixier-Vignancour in the 1965 French presidential election, led to the adoption of a meta-political strategy of 'cultural hegemony' within the nascent Nouvelle Droite (ND). GRECE, an ethno-nationalist think-tank founded in 1968 to influence established right-wing political parties and diffuse ND ideas within the society at large, advised its members "to abandon an outdated language" by 1969. Nouvelle Droite thinkers progressively shifted from theories of biological racism toward the claim that different ethno-cultural groups should be kept separate in order to preserve their historical and cultural differences, a concept they name ethno-pluralism. During the 1980s, this tactic was adopted by France's National Front (FN) party, which was then growing in support under the leadership of Jean-Marie Le Pen. After observing the electoral gains of Le Pen's party, in the late 1990s and early 2000s, a UK fascist group, the British National Party—which had recently come under the leadership of Nick Griffin and his "moderniser" faction—also began downplaying its espousal of biological racism in favour of claims about the cultural incompatibility of different ethnic groups.

In Denmark, a far-right group called the Den Danske Forening (The Danish Society) was launched in 1986, presenting arguments about cultural incompatibility aimed largely at refugees entering the country. Its discourse presented Denmark as a culturally homogenous and Christian nation that was threatened by largely Muslim migrants. In Norway, the far-right terrorist Anders Behring Breivik expressed ideas about cultural incompatibility between Muslims and other Europeans, as opposed to biologically racist ideas. In his view, Muslims represented a cultural threat to Europe, but he placed no emphasis on their perceived biological difference.

=== Islamophobia and cultural racism ===
Some scholars who have studied Islamophobia, or prejudice and discrimination toward Muslims, have labelled it a form of cultural racism. For instance, a range of academics studying the English Defence League, an Islamophobic street protest organisation founded in 2009, have labelled it culturally racist. Anthias suggested that it was appropriate to talk of "anti-Muslim racism" because the latter involved attributing the Muslim population "with fixed, unchanging and negative characteristics" and then subjecting them "to relations of inferiorization and exclusion", traits that she associated with the term "racism".

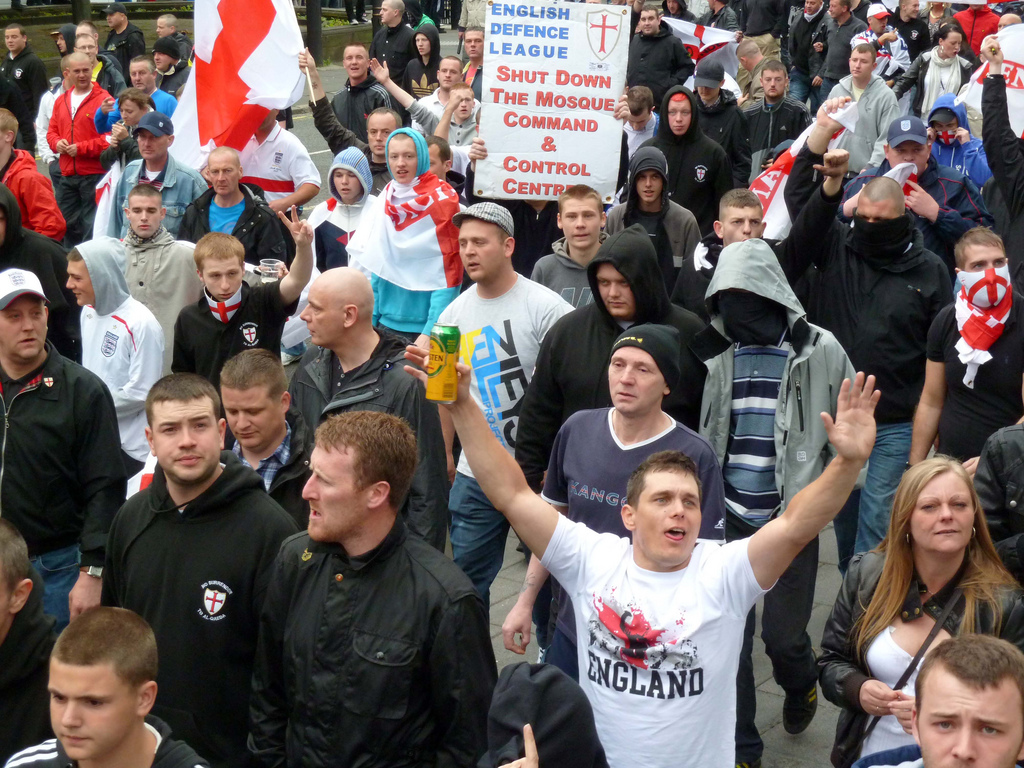
Various scholars who have studied the English Defence League (demonstration pictured) have argued that its Islamophobia can be called "cultural racism".

The media studies scholar Arun Kundnani suggested some difference between cultural racism and Islamophobia. He noted that while cultural racism perceived "the body as the essential location of racial identity", specifically through its "forms of dress, rituals, languages and so on", Islamophobia "seems to locate identity not so much in a racialised body but in a set of fixed religious beliefs and practices". The sociologist Ali Rattansi argued that while many forms of Islamophobia did exhibit racism, for instance by conflating Muslims with Arabs and presenting them as being uniformly barbaric, in his view Islamophobia was "not necessarily racist", instead coming in both racist and non-racist forms.

In 2018, the UK's all-party parliamentary group on British Muslims, chaired by politicians Anna Soubry and Wes Streeting, proposed a working definition of Islamophobia as "a type of racism that targets expressions of Muslimness or perceived Muslimness". This generated concerns that such a definition would criminalise criticism of Islam. Writing in The Spectator, David Green referred to it as "a backdoor blasphemy law" that would shield one religion from criticism, including criticism from other Muslims. The British anti-racism campaigner Trevor Phillips also argued that it was inappropriate for the UK government to view Islamophobia as racism. Martin Hewitt, the chair of the National Police Chiefs' Council, warned that implementing that definition could exacerbate community tensions and hamper counter-terrorist policing. While the Labour Party and Liberal Democrats adopted the all-party parliamentary group's definition, the Conservative Party government rejected it, stating that the definition required "further careful consideration" and had "not been broadly accepted". Various British Muslims and groups like the Muslim Council of Britain expressed disappointment at the government's decision.

== Opposing cultural racism ==
During the 1980s and 1990s, both Balibar and Taguieff expressed the view that established approaches to anti-racist activism were designed to tackle scientific racism and thus were destabilized when confronted with cultural racism. In 1999, Flecha argued that the main approach to anti-racist education adopted in Europe had been a "relativistic" one that emphasised diversity and difference between ethnic groups – the same basic message promoted by cultural racism. He thus thought that such programs "exacerbate rather than eliminate racism". Flecha expressed the view that to combat cultural racism, anti-racists should instead utilise a "dialogic" approach which encourages different ethnic groups to live alongside each other according to rules that they have all agreed upon through a "free and egalitarian dialogue".

Wollenberg commented that those radical right-wing groups which emphasise cultural difference had converted "multiculturalist anti-racism into a tool of racism". According to Balibar, the cultural racist position argues that when ethnic groups co-exist in the same location it "naturally" results in conflict. Proponents of cultural racism therefore argue that attempts at integrating different ethnic and cultural groups itself leads to prejudice and discrimination. In doing this they seek to portray their own views as the "true anti-racism", as opposed to the views of those activists who call themselves "anti-racists".

=== Through education ===
[S]chools may be one of the few public institutions that have the potential to counteract a culturally racist ideology [in the U.S.] […] [I]t is also imperative that we confront cultural racism in our schools and classrooms so that our society eventually might overcome notions of White supremacy and become more inclusive and accepting of our human diversity.

— Scholar of critical pedagogy Rebecca Powell, 2000

Arguing from his position as a scholar of critical pedagogy, Giroux proposed using both "a representational pedagogy and a pedagogy of representation" to address cultural racism. This would include encouraging students to read accounts of race relations which challenge those written by liberal commentators, who he thought concealed their underlying ideology and the existence of racial power relations. It would also include teaching students methodologies that would alert them to how different media reinforce existing forms of authority. Specifically, he urged teachers to provide their students with the "analytic tools" through which they could learn to challenge accounts that perpetuated ethnocentric discourses and thus "racism, sexism and colonialism". More broadly, he urged leftist activists not to abandon identity politics in the face of U.S. cultural racism, but instead called on them to "not only construct a new politics of difference but extend and deepen the possibilities of critical cultural work by reasserting the primacy of the pedagogical as a form of cultural politics".

Similarly, Powell argued that schools were the best place to counteract "cultural racism", in that it was here that teachers could expose children to the underlying ideas on which cultural assumptions are based. She added that in the U.S., schools should commit themselves to promoting multiculturalism and anti-racism. As practical proposals, she suggested teaching pupils about non-standard vernacular languages other than Standard English and explaining to them how the latter "became (and remains) the language of power". She also suggested getting pupils to discuss how images in popular media reflect prejudicial assumptions about different ethnic groups and to examine historical events and works of literature from a range of different cultural perspectives.
