= Martin Barker =

British media studies researcher (1946–2022)

- Born: 20 April 1946
- Died: 8 September 2022 (aged 76)
- Occupation: Emeritus Professor

Martin Barker (20 April 1946 – 8 September 2022) was a British scholar of media studies and cultural studies. He was an Emeritus Professor at Aberystwyth University, having previously taught at the University of the West of England and the University of Sussex. Over the course of his career he wrote or co-edited fifteen books. He was known for being one of the pioneers behind the concept of cultural racism, which he termed "new racism".

Barker received an undergraduate degree in philosophy from the University of Liverpool in 1967, after which he lectured in cultural studies at Bristol Polytechnic, later renamed the University of the West of England, from 1969 to 1998. Identifying as a committed socialist and anti-racist, during the 1970s, Barker focused his research on racism, in particular its place in British children's comics. Studying growing hostility to migrants in Britain, he coined the idea of "new racism"—later known as cultural racism—and promoted this through his 1981 book The New Racism. His argument was that the concept of "racism", created in the 1930s to describe biological racism, should be extended to take into account prejudices against people on the basis of cultural difference. In 1995 he gained a DPhil from that university.

In the 70s and 80s Barker was an early scholar to take seriously comic books as cultural artefacts, writing a number of books and articles on the subject and ranging from the US pre-code horror comics of the 1950s (and the campaigns to censor them), to more contemporaneous campaigns to ban the British Action comic in the 70s, and sociological analyses of 'girls' comics/magazines such as Jackie and Bunty, the 'funnys' (Beano, Buster, Shiver and Shake), and action / horror comics (2000 AD, Scream!).

Barker's interest with censorship began with comics but quickly spread to timely early research on 'video nasties', then film more generally (Child's Play, Crash, Human Centipede) and the roots and justifications of media censorship through what he deemed 'common sense' claims of 'media effects'. This culminated in a major audience research project for the British national film and video game censorship body the BBFC in the early 2000s.

He then worked as reader in media studies at the University of Sussex from 1998 to 2001, before becoming professor of film and television studies at the University of Aberystwyth, where he remained until 2011, when he became professor emeritus, and moved to the Film and Television department of the University of East Anglia. Much of his work in the 1990s and 2000s focused on media audiences, looking in particular at the audiences for science fiction texts such as Judge Dredd and Alien and fantasy fiction like The Lord of the Rings film trilogy and Game of Thrones.

== Biography ==
Barker was born on 20 April 1946. He received an undergraduate degree in philosophy from the University of Liverpool in 1967.

Barker worked for 29 years at the University of West England, becoming Head of the School of Cultural Studies, before spending 2 years as a reader at the University of Sussex. In January 2001, Barker was appointed a Professor of Film and Television Studies at Aberystwyth University, where he was an emeritus professor.

== Research and publications ==
Barker described himself as "a committed socialist all my adult life" and during the 1970s was a member of the International Socialists (IS) group. Committed to anti-racism, he came to believe that the IS's focus on combating the growth of the fascist National Front "didn't seem to me to be the heart of the matter" and that there was a larger issue at play in British society. Early in his academic career, Barker researched and published work on racism in the UK and children's comics, including Action and 2000 AD. He coined the term "new racism" in 1981 in the context of racist public discourse about immigration to the UK during the reign of Margaret Thatcher.

In the 1980s, Barker became an outspoken critic of the video nasties censorship campaign in the UK, which was led by the Daily Mail and public pressure group the National Viewers' and Listeners' Association, spearheaded by Mary Whitehouse. A later book, Ill Effects: The Media Violence Debate, co-edited with Julian Petley, dismantled theories of “media effects” and “copycat violence” inspired by violent media which were reported often as “common sense” in the British press.

Later in his career, Barker focused much more on studies of media audiences, drawing upon his background in cultural studies. His co-authored study of audiences of the Sylvester Stallone film, Judge Dredd, was influential in the field of audience studies. In response to the censorship campaign against David Cronenberg’s Crash, again by the Daily Mail, Barker, along with Jane Arthurs and Ramiswami Harindranath, oversaw and authored a study on the film's reception in the press and conducted an audience study. This was published as The Crash Controversy: Censorship Campaigns and Film Reception by Wallflower Press in 2001. Over the course of these and other audience studies, Barker developed a methodology for studying audiences which to date remains very influential in the field.

At Aberystwyth University, Barker was commissioned by British film censors, the BBFC, to produce research on audiences and issues around watching sexual violence on screen. He has recently been an outspoken critic of recent research used by the BBFC to justify implementing tighter censorship.

Barker served as director on an ESRC-funded international audience research project on The Lord of the Rings which resulted in Watching Lord of the Rings: Tolkien's World Audiences. A follow-up project was overseen by Barker, studying audience responses to The Hobbit, which involved 145 researchers in 46 countries. It received 36,109 responses and is the largest audience study ever conducted. He then directed the international Game of Thrones audience study.

Barker specialised in the study of media audiences, and oversaw an international audience research project on Game of Thrones.

== Selected works ==
- The New Racism: Conservatives and the Ideology of the Tribe, London: Junction Books 1981.
- A Haunt of Fears: the Strange History of the British Horror Comics Campaign, Pluto Press 1984.
- The Video Nasties: Freedom and Censorship in the Arts (edited and contributed), Pluto Press 1984.
- Comics: Ideology, Power and the Critics, Manchester University Press 1989.
- Action: The Story of a Violent Comic, Titan Books 1990.
- Reading into Cultural Studies, Routledge 1992. Co-edited with Anne Beezer and contributed.
- The Lasting of the Mohicans: History of an American Myth, University Press of Mississippi 1996. Co-authored with Roger Sabin.
- Ill Effects: the Media-Violence Debate, Routledge 1997 [revised second edition published April 2001]. Co-edited with Julian Petley and contributed.
- Knowing Audiences: Judge Dredd, its Friends, Fans and Foes, University of Luton Press 1998. Co-authored with Kate Brooks.
- From Antz To Titanic: Reinventing Film Analysis (with a contribution by Thomas Austin), London: Pluto Press 2000.
- The Crash Controversy: Censorship Campaigns and Film Reception, London: Wallflower Press 2001. Co-authored with Jane Arthurs and Ramaswami Harindranath.
- Contemporary Hollywood Stardom, London: Arnold 2003. Co-edited with Thomas Austin.
- 'Assessing the “quality” in qualitative research: the case of text-audience relations', European Journal of Communication, 18:3, 2003, pp. 315–35.
- Watching the Lord of the Rings: Tolkien's World Audiences, NY: Peter Lang 2007. Co-edited with Ernest Mathijs and contributed.
- 'Audiences and Receptions of Sexual Violence in Contemporary Cinema', Report to the British Board of Film Classification, 2007. Project director and report co-authored with Ernest Mathijs, Jamie Sexton, Kate Egan, Russ Hunter and Melanie Selfe.
- 'News, Reviews, Clues, Interviews and Other Ancillary Materials – a Critique and Research Proposal', Scope: on-line Film Studies Journal, February 2004, included subsequently in Scope Reader, 2007.
- 'The challenge of censorship: “figuring out” the audience', Velvet Light Trap, 63, Spring 2009, pp. 60–62.
- A 'Toxic Genre': the Iraq War Films, London: Pluto Press, 2011.
- Live to Your Local Cinema: The Remarkable Rise of Livecasting (Palgrave Pivot, 2013)
- Alien Audiences: Remembering and Evaluating a Classic Movie, Basingstoke: Palgrave, 2015. Co-authored with Kate Egan, Tom Phillips & Sarah Ralph.
- 'Introduction: The World Hobbit Project', Participations 13.2, 2016, pp. 158–74. Co-authored with Ernest Mathijs.
- Watching Game of Thrones: How audiences engage with dark television (Manchester University Press, 2021). Co-authored with Feeona Atwood and Clarissa Smith.
