= 2017 UK Independence Party leadership election =

United Kingdom independence party (UKIP) leadership election

- 29 September 2017
- Turnout: 39.4% (▼7.5%)
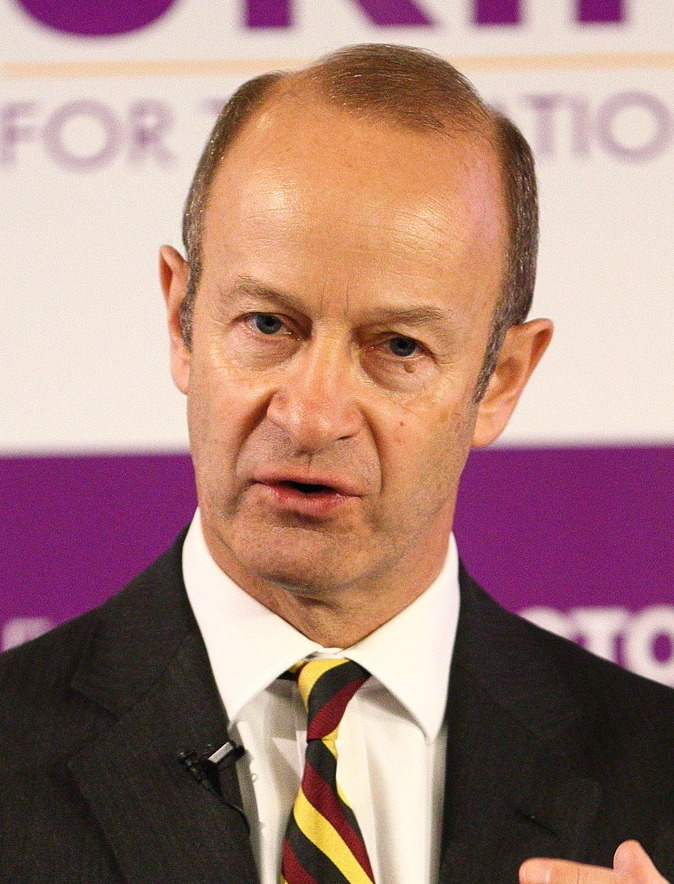

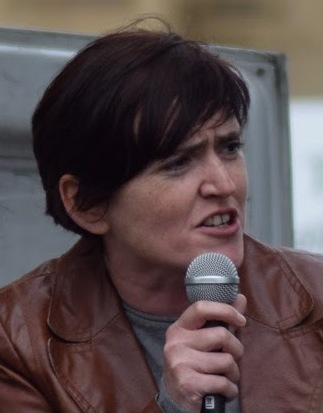

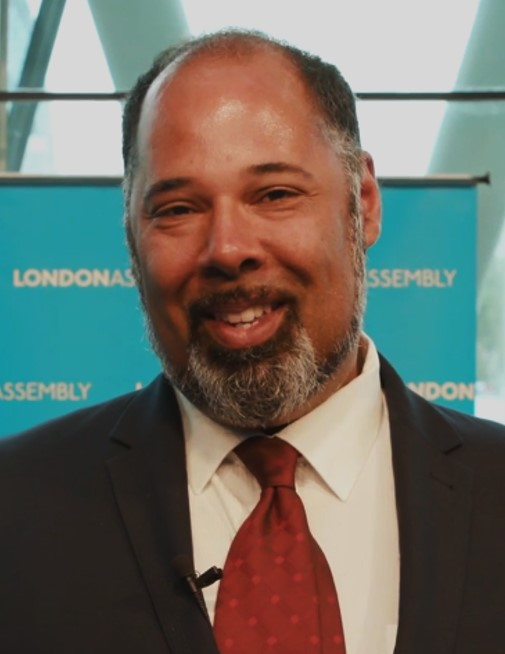

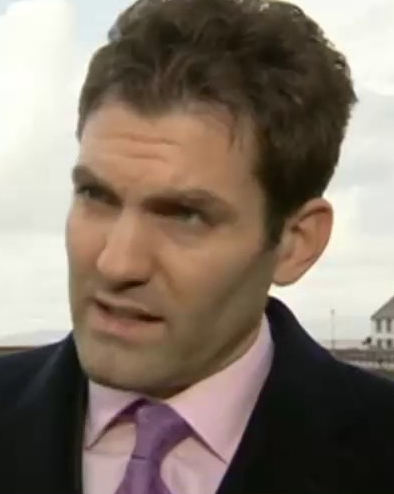

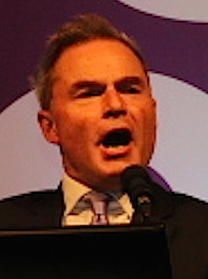

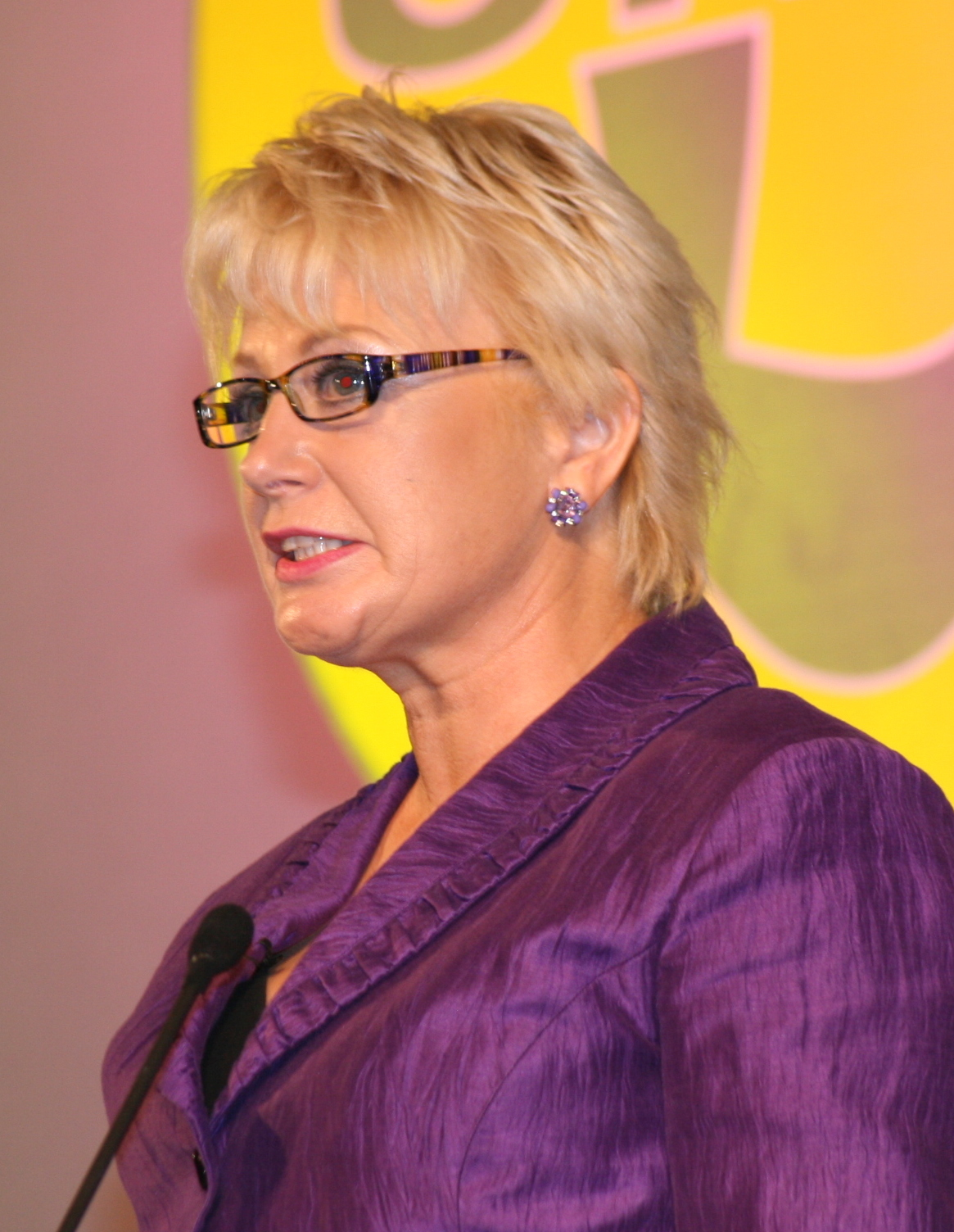
| Candidate | Henry Bolton | Anne Marie Waters | David Kurten |
| Running mate | – | Stuart Agnew | – |
| Percentage | 30.0% | 21.3% | 17.0% |
| Popular vote | 3,874 | 2,755 | 2,201 |
| Candidate | John Rees-Evans | Peter Whittle | Jane Collins |
| Running mate | Bill Etheridge | – | David Coburn |
| Percentage | 15.6% | 10.9% | 4.4% |
| Popular vote | 2,021 | 1,413 | 566 |
Leader before election
Steve Crowther (interim);
previously Paul Nuttall
Elected Leader
Henry Bolton

The 2017 UK Independence Party leadership election was called following the resignation of Paul Nuttall as leader of the UK Independence Party on 9 June 2017, following the poor performance of the party in the 2017 general election. Former party chairman Steve Crowther was chosen three days later to serve as interim leader.

On 11 August, the party confirmed that eleven candidates had been cleared to stand for the leadership. Subsequently, the number on the ballot fell to seven as four withdrew to support other candidates.

The election was won by Henry Bolton with 30.0% of the vote.

== Election rules ==
The leadership contest took place under a first-past-the-post system, where the candidate with the greatest number of votes became leader.

According to party rules, candidates had to have been party members for at least two years as of 23 June 2017, and needed the support of one hundred members across at least ten local parties. Candidates paid a £5,000 deposit, half of which was refundable for candidates who received at least 20% of the vote.

=== Timetable ===
The election timetable is as follows:

| 23 June | Opening of nominations |
| 28 July | Closing of nominations |
| 4 August | List of applicants announced |
| 11 August | Deadline for withdrawal of candidature and final list of candidates announced |
| 23 August – 11 September | Programme of regional hustings |
| 1–8 September | Despatch of ballot papers |
| 29 September | Completion of verification, count and declaration of the winner |

== Campaign ==
There was immediate speculation that former leader Nigel Farage MEP might stand for a third period as leader. Bill Etheridge MEP and Thanet District Council leader Chris Wells both indicated they might stand if Farage did not. Farage subsequently announced in early July that he would not be standing. In the event, neither Etheridge nor Wells stood for the leadership; Etheridge became the running mate of John Rees-Evans.

A key divide between candidates was between what The Guardian described as "Farage-ist economic libertarians" like Etheridge and the "more hard-right, Islam-focused" Anne Marie Waters and Peter Whittle. Etheridge stated that "whichever side wins, the other side won't have a future in the party". In early July, over a thousand new members had joined the party in only two weeks, leading to accusations of far-right infiltration in support of Waters. Party sources suggested Waters had concluded a deal with Whittle that were he to win, she would become deputy leader, which Whittle denied.

Nominations closed on 28 July, with candidates then being approved as candidates by the party's executive. On 21 August the number fell to ten, when David Allen withdrew to support Henry Bolton. The number of candidates fell again on 31 August, to seven, as Ben Walker, David Coburn MEP and Marion Mason all stepped down in order to form a "Victory for the Ukip United" ticket with Jane Collins. The four wanted to see the party reflect Farage's leadership, rather than "banging on about Islam and gay marriage". Were Collins to be elected, Coburn would have become Deputy Leader with Walker as Party Chairman.

=== Controversy ===
At least 18 of the party's 20 MEPs were reported to be considering resigning and forming a new party if Waters won the leadership or was given a senior role in the party, given her anti-Islam views and support from the far-right. Etheridge publicly said that he would resign if Waters won, and Jonathan Arnott MEP said it would be difficult for him to remain. Etheridge subsequently launched his third leadership bid, having previously declared in both of UKIP's 2016 leadership elections.

Etheridge withdrew his candidacy on 26 July, two days before close of nominations. He urged candidates from the "libertarian" wing of the party to unite against what he described as fringe candidates using the party "as a vehicle for the views of the EDL and the BNP". He said he would leave the party if Waters or Whittle won the leadership. Jack Buckby, a former parliamentary candidate for Liberty GB who as a former BNP member is barred from joining UKIP, was reported to be helping Waters in her campaign.

Controversy over Waters continued, with Mike Hookem MEP resigning as the party's deputy whip in the European Parliament in protest at her candidacy and at the chief whip Stuart Agnew's support for her. Hookem described Waters as "far-right". Nathan Gill MEP also said he would leave the party if she won. Waters and Whittle both expressed concern at Sharia councils in the UK.

LGBT rights defined another split between those who declared as candidates, with three (Whittle, Waters and Coburn) being openly gay, while David Kurten and John Rees-Evans had both said that they oppose same-sex marriage. Kurten faced criticism when he claimed that gay people are more likely to be abused as children. Whittle retorted: "Neither I, nor any of the gay friends and colleagues I have known over 35 years, were sexually abused."

In August, Rees-Evans announced a proposal to offer £9,000 and health insurance to Britons with dual nationality, in return for them moving to countries where they have the right to settle. They would be required to start a business and trade with the UK. This would be to help achieve "negative net immigration towards one million a year", and would be funded by cutting the foreign aid budget. He was condemned by rivals Whittle and Collins; both Collins and Liberal Democrat MP Tom Brake compared the proposal to the BNP's manifesto.

On 24 August, Lawrence Webb, UKIP group leader on Havering London Borough Council and former mayoral candidate, tweeted that he "won’t stand for 2018 local elections if Peter Whittle wins". The following day, the Romford Recorder reported that all six of Havering Council's UKIP councillors "will not stand in next year’s local elections if Peter Whittle is named leader of their party".

== Candidates ==
| Candidate | Political roles | Endorsements |
|---|---|---|
| Henry Bolton | Candidate for Kent Police and Crime Commissioner in 2016 | David Allen; James Carver; Ray Finch; Mike Hookem; Jill Seymour |
| Jane Collins | UKIP Home Affairs and Justice Spokesperson (since 2016) UKIP Employment Spokesperson (2014–2016); MEP for Yorkshire and the Humber (since 2014); Parliamentary candidate in Rotherham in 2015 and 2012; Parliamentary candidate in Barnsley Central in 2011; Parliamentary candidate in Scunthorpe in 2010 | David Coburn; Sharon Ellul-Bonici; Marion Mason; Ben Walker |
| David Kurten | UKIP Education and Apprenticeships Spokesperson (since 2016) London-wide Member (AM) of the London Assembly (since 2016); Parliamentary candidate in Castle Point in 2017; Parliamentary candidate in Camberwell and Peckham in 2015 | Leave.EU; Paul Joseph Watson; Arron Banks; David Rowlands; Raheem Kassam |
| Aidan Powlesland | Business owner Parliamentary candidate for Suffolk South in 2017; Parliamentary candidate for Harrow East in 2015 | |
| John Rees-Evans | Parliamentary candidate for Cardiff South and Penarth in 2015 Leadership candidate in November 2016 | Bill Etheridge |
| Anne Marie Waters | Director of Sharia Watch UK (since 2014) Parliamentary candidate for Lewisham East in 2015 | Stuart Agnew; Ingrid Carlqvist; Geert Wilders; Tommy Robinson; Anke Van dermeersch |
| Peter Whittle | Deputy Leader of UKIP (since 2016) UKIP Culture and Communities Spokesperson (since 2014); London-wide Member (AM) of, and Leader of UKIP in, the London Assembly (since 2016); London mayoral candidate in 2016; Candidate for European Parliament in 2014; Parliamentary candidate for South Basildon and East Thurrock in 2017; Parliamentary candidate for Eltham in 2015 | Roger Helmer; Paul Nuttall; Tim Aker; Louise Bours |

=== Declined ===
- Phillip Broughton, Parliamentary candidate for Hartlepool in 2015 and 2017; candidate for Leader in September 2016
- Nigel Farage, former Leader of UKIP (2006–2009 and 2010–2016; interim in 2016); MEP for South East England
- Neil Hamilton, Leader of UKIP in Wales and in the National Assembly for Wales; Member of the National Assembly for Wales (AM) for Mid and West Wales; Co-Deputy Chair of UKIP (2014–2016)

=== Withdrawn ===
- David Coburn MEP (endorsed Jane Collins)
- Marion Mason (endorsed Jane Collins)
- Ben Walker (endorsed Jane Collins)
- David Allen (endorsed Henry Bolton)

== Results ==
2017 UK Independence Party leadership election
| Candidate | Votes | | % |
|---|---|---|---|
| Henry Bolton | 3,874 | | 30.0% |
| Anne Marie Waters | 2,755 | | 21.3% |
| David Kurten | 2,201 | | 17.0% |
| John Rees-Evans | 2,021 | | 15.6% |
| Peter Whittle | 1,413 | | 10.9% |
| Jane Collins | 566 | | 4.4% |
| Aidan Powlesland | 85 | | 0.7% |
| Turnout | | 12,915 | 39.4% |
Henry Bolton elected as leader

== Aftermath ==
Bolton said that his victory had prevented UKIP from becoming a British version of the Nazi Party, condemning rhetoric of a war with Islam. He went on to be sacked as party leader by a vote at an emergency conference of the party in February 2018.

Waters described the election result as a victory of jihad against truth. Singer Morrissey claimed that the party had rigged the vote in order to prevent Waters from winning.

Rees-Evans resigned from UKIP to found a new political party, called Affinity, but instead joined the Democrats and Veterans party and assuming its leadership. Waters set up a new political party, For Britain, but later returned to UKIP in 2023, and made a second leadership bid the following year. Powlesland left UKIP and stood as a local election candidate for the Libertarian Party UK in May 2018.
