= Henry Bolton (British politician) =

British army and police officer

Henry Bolton OBE
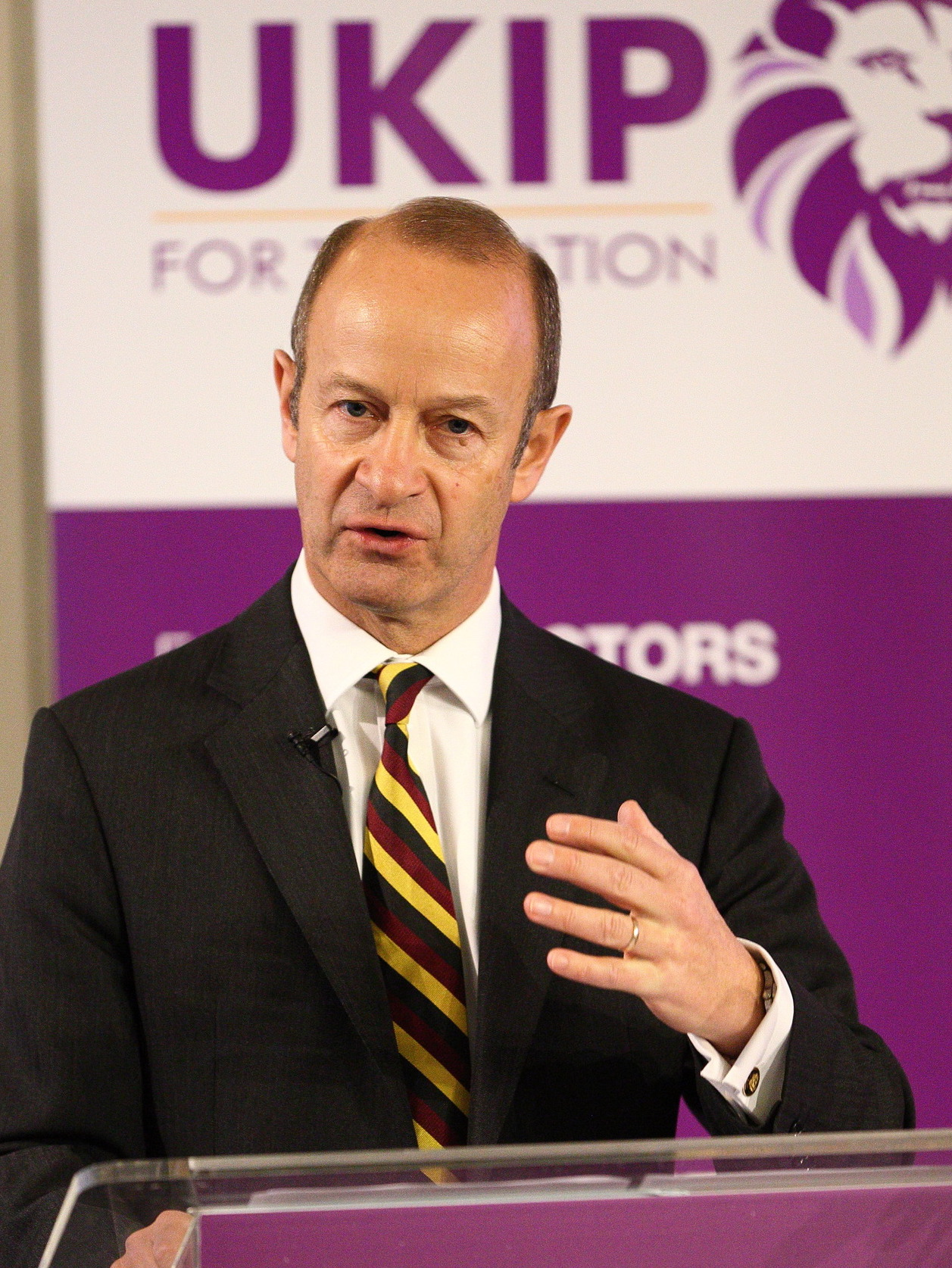
- Bolton speaking at Save Our Services campaign in London in 2017

SDP Spokesperson for Foreign Affairs, Defence and Security
- In office 26 April 2025 – July 2026
- Leader: William Clouston

Leader of Our Nation
- In office 31 October 2018 – 4 November 2019
- Preceded by: Party founded
- Succeeded by: Party dissolved

Leader of the UK Independence Party
- In office 29 September 2017 – 17 February 2018
- Deputy: Margot Parker
- Preceded by: Paul Nuttall
- Succeeded by: Gerard Batten

UKIP Spokesperson for Defence
- In office 15 January 2018 – 17 February 2018
- Preceded by: Bill Etheridge
- Succeeded by: Ray Finch

Personal details
- Born: Henry David Bolton; 2 March 1963 (age 63) Nairobi, Kenya Colony
- Party: Restore Britain (since 2026)
- Other political affiliations: Social Democratic Party (2025–2026); Our Nation (2018–2019); UK Independence Party (2014–2018); Liberal Democrats (1999–2014)
- Spouses: Karin Dohn (m. 1984; div. 1987); Lidia Gouniakova (m. 2002; div. 2007); Tatiana Smurova (m. 2006; div. 2018)
- Children: 3
- Education: Royal Military Academy Sandhurst - TA commissioning course (2 weeks)
- Military career
- Allegiance: United Kingdom
- Branch: British Army
- Service years: 1979–2000
- Rank: Captain
- Service number: 540249
- Awards: OBE; NATO Bosnia Campaign Medal; United Nations Kosovo Mission Medal; Civilian Afghanistan Service Medal

Henry David Bolton OBE (born 2 March 1963) is a British politician who was the leader of the UK Independence Party (UKIP) from 29 September 2017 to 17 February 2018. He served in the British Army, attaining the rank of lance corporal, and went on to reach the rank of captain following his transfer to the Territorial Army from the Regular Army. Bolton has also served as a police officer. Prior to becoming UKIP Leader, Bolton also worked for the EU for more than a year on EU projects in the Balkans.

Bolton became UKIP leader after winning the party's 2017 leadership election, and gave himself the additional role of Defence spokesman in January 2018. Bolton was removed as party leader in February 2018, following his relationship with a party member, and an ensuing controversy caused over racist comments she had made to a friend about Prince Harry's fiancée, Meghan Markle. Bolton's departure triggered UKIP's fourth leadership election in 18 months. He subsequently announced plans to establish a new political party, to be called OneNation, that would adopt a Eurosceptic stance like UKIP. The party, under the name Our Nation, was registered with the Electoral Commission on 31 October 2018, but de-registered on 4 November 2019. He went on to join the Social Democratic Party, becoming its spokesperson for foreign affairs, defence and security. In July 2026, Bolton joined Restore Britain as spokesman on national security.

== Early life and career ==
Bolton was born in Nairobi, British Kenya, on 2 March 1963. He served in the Royal Hussars from 1979 to 1990, rising to the rank of lance-corporal. After leaving the regular army in 1990, for eight years he was a police constable in the Thames Valley Police, during which time he received an award for outstanding bravery.

While serving in the police, Bolton joined the part-time Territorial Army, and in 1992, gained a commission in its Wessex Regiment. Two years later, he was promoted to captain. Following the disbanding of the Wessex Regiment, Bolton served part-time in the Royal Gloucestershire, Berkshire and Wiltshire Regiment and the Royal Rifle Volunteers, before leaving the Territorial Army in 2000.

Bolton left the Thames Valley Police in 1998 to take on overseas security and policing roles, including work for the Foreign and Commonwealth Office in hostile environments, including Afghanistan.

Bolton was appointed an Officer of the Order of the British Empire in the 2013 New Year Honours "for services to international security and stabilisation" following his role as a Stabilisation Team Leader for the Provincial Reconstruction Team in Helmand Province, Afghanistan.

== Early political career ==
Bolton stood as the Liberal Democrat candidate at the 2005 general election for the seat of Runnymede and Weybridge in Surrey, but in 2014 joined the UK Independence Party (UKIP), saying that he felt more comfortable in a party that said what it thought. In 2015, he stood as a UKIP candidate for Shepway District Council.

Bolton was the UKIP candidate in the 2016 election for Kent Police and Crime Commissioner, while working for the European Commission, finishing in second place to the Conservative candidate Matthew Scott.

In 2017, Bolton was vice chairman of the Remembrance Line Association heritage group and a founding member of the Folkestone Heritage, Arts and Tourism Forum.

== Leader of UKIP ==
In July 2017, Bolton declared that he was standing in UKIP's forthcoming leadership election. He began as a relative unknown in a field of eleven candidates; however, his standing improved as other candidates withdrew, and he received the endorsements of four of the party's MEPs who presumably knew Bolton from his time working in Brussels for the EU: James Carver, Jill Seymour, Mike Hookem and Ray Finch. The former UKIP leader Nigel Farage had acted as his political referee to stand for the leadership.

In August 2017, Bolton challenged the decision to allow Anne Marie Waters to stand as party leader. He said her candidacy was in violation of the party's rules of procedure as she was not considered to be 'in good standing' due to previous exclusions for elections. He withdrew the challenge when faced with the possibility that it could lead to counter-suits against the party. Subsequently, he was quoted by the press as saying that UKIP was in danger of becoming the "UK Nazi party" if the wrong candidate were elected as leader.

Later in his leadership campaign, Bolton spoke of Britain's separation from the EU, saying that UKIP has "a moral responsibility to make sure Brexit is a success for everybody".

Following his victory, on 28 September, Bolton said "Brexit is our core task", while separately declaring Islam a "concern", although he believed an anti-Islam agenda would offer UKIP little gain. In recognition of his new role, in October 2017 he was placed at Number 86 in 'The Top 100 Most Influential People on the Right' by commentator Iain Dale.

== Loss of UKIP leadership ==
On 4 January 2018, it was reported that Bolton had left his wife and embarked on a relationship with Jo Marney, a model and party member nearly 30 years his junior. As a consequence, Bolton faced demands from members of UKIP that he stand down as leader. On 14 January it was reported that Marney had been suspended from UKIP following allegations that she had sent a series of SMS messages containing racist comments about Prince Harry's fiancée, Meghan Markle. Her comments also targeted immigrants and Grenfell Tower families. The following day, Bolton announced he had ended his relationship with Marney, but on 18 January the Evening Standard reported that the two continued to be seen in each other's company. Responding to these reports, Bolton suggested that the controversy would "fade away".

On 19 January 2018, MEP Jonathan Arnott announced his resignation from UKIP. In his resignation letter, he stated that he had lost confidence in Bolton, who he felt was "not the right person for the job" – but thought no better of those "jockeying" for position in the party. On 21 January, the UKIP National Executive Committee (NEC) delivered a vote of no confidence in Bolton; only Bolton voted against the motion. Bolton had made it clear earlier that day that he would not resign if the vote went against him, because he felt another leadership election would destroy the party. Consequently, at the emergency meeting of UKIP's NEC, it was decided that party members would be balloted on whether Bolton should be removed from office, as the NEC did not itself have the power to dismiss the leader. On 22 January, Margot Parker resigned as deputy leader, claiming Bolton had left the party in "limbo". Immigration spokesman John Bickley, Trade and Industry spokesman William Dartmouth and other spokesmen resigned on the same day. Bolton responded that he would not quit as leader, and it was "time to drain the swamp" of the malcontents. He looked on the UKIP national executive as "not fit for purpose" and in need of reform. UKIP education spokesman David Kurten commented that Bolton had no chance of surviving a vote of party members.

At an extraordinary general meeting held in Birmingham on 17 February, 63% backed a motion of no confidence in Bolton, and he was removed as UKIP leader, a decision that triggered UKIP's fourth leadership election in 18 months. Acting UKIP leader Gerard Batten subsequently suggested that Bolton had left the party.

On 22 February 2018, Bolton and Marney appeared as guests on an edition of the ITV daytime magazine programme This Morning where Bolton argued that Marney's Grenfell Tower comments had been taken out of context and that it was important to have a debate about illegal immigration.

== Post-UKIP ==
=== Our Nation ===
On 6 March 2018, Bolton announced his intention to establish a new political party, OneNation, that would "campaign unceasingly for our full independence from the EU" and that would "mirror some of the changes that I sought to bring to UKIP". The registration application for OneNation was rejected by the Electoral Commission as "likely to mislead voters", its name being the same as an existing Islamic relief charity. Our Nation was registered with the Electoral Commission on 31 October 2018. Bolton was listed as leader, with Ben Glayzer as nominating officer and Hodgson Birkby as treasurer. The registered address was a suite in the Grand Hotel, Folkestone, where Bolton was a permanent resident. Party membership was £27.50 a year, or £750 for "John Bull membership" which included drinks with the leader and a twice-yearly John Bull Newsletter. (Note: Our Nation was also the name of an earlier, unrelated UK far-right party founded by Martin Webster in 1983.) The party was de-registered on 4 November 2019.

=== 2019 general election ===
Bolton contested the 2019 general election in Folkestone and Hythe as an independent, after the Brexit Party decided not to contest the seat. He received 576 votes (1%).

=== Social Democratic Party ===
Bolton joined the Social Democratic Party (SDP) in early 2025. Later that year he was appointed as the SDP's spokesperson for foreign affairs, defence & security.

=== Restore Britain ===
In July 2026, Bolton was announced as Restore Britain's spokesman on national security.

== Political views ==
Bolton has said that the effectiveness of policies is more important than whether they are from the left or the right. As a Liberal Democrat he said that being tough on issues of law and order was part of the party's principles. At the launch of his campaign to be UKIP leader, Bolton highlighted his opposition to the practice of female genital mutilation.

== Author ==
In September 2019, Bolton's book What a State! was published. It explores what he sees as failures in modern British political leadership, the inadequacies of MPs, challenges of political leadership, Brexit, populism, identity politics, the meeting of equal representation and equal opportunities, and the institutional culture of the civil service. A preface is by Lembit Öpik. A review in The New European commented that the book quoted from Sophocles, Shakespeare, and Einstein, but that nothing was as good as Jo Marney's explanation for claiming why she felt like Anne Frank.

== Personal life ==
Bolton's first marriage was to Karin Dohn, a Danish national. They had one daughter, born in 1985. That marriage ended in divorce, and Bolton married secondly the Russian-born Lidia Gouniakova. In 2018, Gouniakova said Bolton had left her for Tatiana Smurova, another Russian, who became his third wife. She was known as Tatiana Smurova-Bolton, and they had two children together. In May 2016, Smurova-Bolton gave birth to their second child on a train at St Pancras railway station. The couple separated at Christmas 2017, and their divorce took place in 2018.

Bolton began a relationship with Jo Marney after meeting her shortly before Christmas 2017, and spent Christmas with her, after leaving his wife and two small children. He said that he ended the relationship with Marney after details of her SMS message comments, in which she made overtly racist comments against Meghan Markle, the then fiancée and now wife of Prince Harry, came to light, though the two continued to see each other. Bolton said he had been unaware of Marney's comments. However, during their This Morning appearance following his resignation, Bolton and Marney confirmed their relationship had ended while he sought to keep his office, but that it had since been rekindled. Later, he said that the relationship had never actually ended. It was reported in August 2020 that Bolton and Marney had separated.

== Notes ==
Party political offices
Preceded by Steve Crowther; Acting	Leader of the UK Independence Party; 2017–2018	Succeeded by Gerard Batten
