= Jack Buckby =

British politician (born 1993)

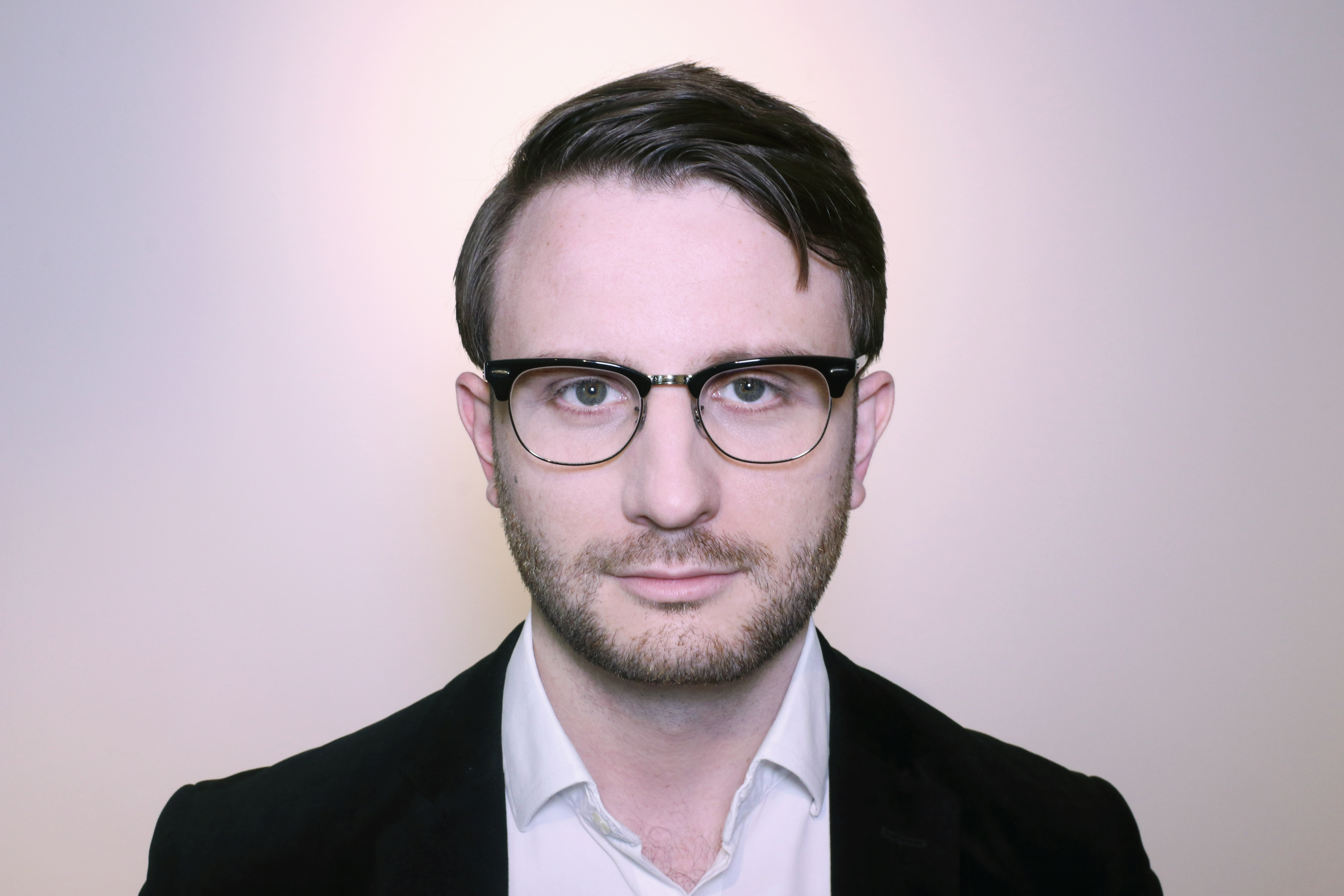
- Born: 10 February 1993 (age 33); Lancashire, England, UK
- Years active: 2012–present
- Political party: British National Party (until 2013); Liberty GB (2013–2017); For Britain Movement (2017–2020)
- Spouse: Martina Markota
- Website: jackbuckby.co.uk

Jack Buckby (born 10 February 1993) is a British far-right political figure and author who was previously active in a number of groups and campaigns, including the British National Party, Liberty GB and Proud Boys. In 2017 he was associated with Anne Marie Waters and the For Britain Movement party.

== Early life and the BNP ==
Buckby joined the British National Party after meeting its leader Nick Griffin. He was active in its youth movement, known at various times as BNP Crusaders and Resistance. He started a far-right youth group called the Natural Culturists in July 2012, while studying political science at the University of Liverpool. Griffin introduced him at a meeting of the Alliance of European National Movements in 2012. He was described at the time as a potential future leader of the BNP to succeed Griffin. Buckby left the party the same year, saying that the "open race hatred became unacceptable". He was expelled from the University of Liverpool.

== Liberty GB and Anne Marie Waters ==
Buckby joined Liberty GB, a new far-right party, in 2013. He stood as a candidate in the 2014 European Parliament election for the South East England constituency in third position on the party's list, behind the founder Paul Weston. The list received 0.11% of the vote. By 2016, he was serving as the party's press officer.

In June 2016, he tweeted that the Orlando nightclub shooting was the fault of LGBT people. Following the murder of Jo Cox in 2016 by a far-right activist, Buckby stood as the Liberty GB candidate in the 2016 Batley and Spen by-election to fill Cox's seat, appearing on the ballot as "No to terrorism, yes to Britain". Large parties, including the Conservative Party and the Liberal Democrats did not stand candidates due to the circumstances of the by-election. He came sixth, with 1.1% of the vote.

In February 2017, Buckby told a student activist on television to "take in a Syrian refugee, I hope you don't get raped". He is thought to have left Liberty GB in June 2017, after which he was media manager for Anne Marie Waters's campaign in the 2017 UK Independence Party leadership election. He told an undercover reporter "I'm basically the campaign manager. But I don't make it too public." Waters came second, with 21.3% of the vote. Following the leadership election, Waters started a new party called the For Britain Movement, which Buckby joined.

== Proud Boys ==
Buckby was a former member of the Proud Boys and has been described as the "head" of the Proud Boys in the UK as well as having edited their magazine. He has since stated: "I have had zero involvement with anybody in the Proud Boys since late 2016" and disputes roles assigned to him in the organization by Gavin McInnes.

== Alleged recantation of racist beliefs ==
In an interview with Channel 4 News on 10 July 2020, which also quotes William Baldet of the Centre for Analysis of the Radical Right, Buckby said that he had repudiated his former extremist views and recognised their troubling nature.

Buckby's claim to have fully renounced his racist beliefs has been questioned by Political Research Associates who point out he has continued to make xenophobic (anti-immigrant) and Islamophobic comments post-2020.

== Elections contested ==
=== UK Parliament elections ===
Date	Constituency	Party	Votes	%
2016	Batley and Spen by-election	Liberty GB	220	1.1

=== European Parliament elections ===
Date	Constituency	Party	Votes	%	Note
2014	South East England	Liberty GB	2,494	0.1	Multi-member constituency.Other candidates: Paul Weston, Enza Ferreri
