= Pegida UK =

United Kingdom anti-Islam group

Pegida United Kingdom
- Formation: 2015 (attempted); 4 January 2016 (official)
- Founder: Tommy Robinson
- Founded at: Toddington, Bedfordshire, United Kingdom
- Dissolved: 2016
- Purpose: Islamophobia; British nationalism
- Leader: Paul Weston; Anne Marie Waters
- Adviser: Tommy Robinson
- Affiliations: Fortress Europe

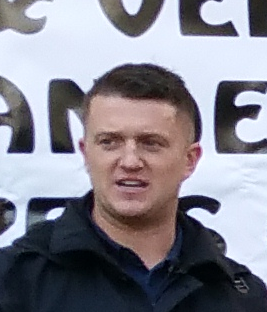
Tommy Robinson at a Pegida rally in Utrecht, the Netherlands on 11 October 2015.

Pegida UK was an anti-Islam group in the United Kingdom established by Tommy Robinson in 2016. It was named after the German group Pegida – Patriotische Europäer gegen die Islamisierung des Abendlandes (German for 'Patriotic Europeans Against the Islamisation of the West').

== History ==
Following one attempted "Pegida UK" march in London in summer 2015 by ex-English Defence League (EDL) members, a second launch of the group was conducted on 4 January 2016 in a pub in Toddington, Bedfordshire, by Tommy Robinson. On the day of the launch, he stepped down to the role of "adviser". Paul Weston (the chairman of a specific political group, Liberty GB) was named leader and Anne Marie Waters (chairman of Sharia Watch) was named as a third member of Pegida UK's management team.

Robinson said that he hoped Pegida UK would be different from the EDL, that it would attract a more "middle-class" demographic, and would discourage the "loutish behaviour and alcohol-fueled violence" of the EDL. Robinson seeks a halt to Muslim immigration, the closure of sharia courts, a ban on the wearing of the burqa and a moratorium on mosque construction.

Pegida UK's launch event was a march in Birmingham on 6 February 2016. It drew a crowd of approximately 200, fewer than the Pegida UK attempt of 2015, with a smaller counter-demonstration also taking place.

By the end of 2016, the group had essentially disappeared. Its leading management had all moved on to other projects. Robinson soon after joined the Canadian right-wing news channel Rebel Media. Weston went back to focusing on his political party Liberty GB, which then dissolved in order to join forces with Waters' For Britain party.

Pegida UK was not the group's only failure. Originating in Dresden, Germany, it had been trying to expand across the continent. In 2016, Pegida launch attempts failed to take off in Switzerland, Ireland, France, Austria, Denmark and Estonia.
