= Paul Weston (politician) =

Political activist (born 1964)

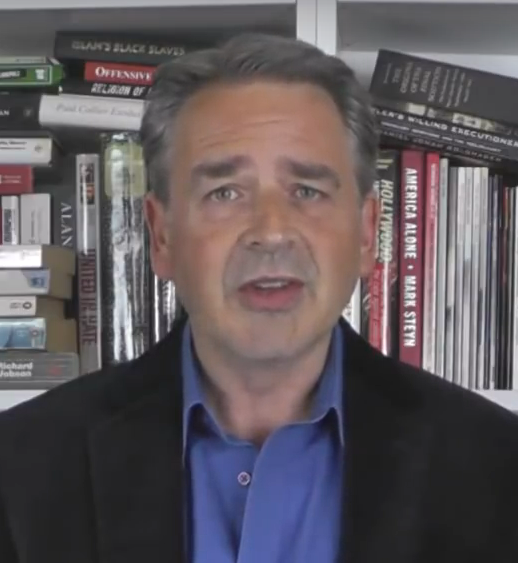
- Weston in 2018

Leader of Liberty GB
- In office March 2013 – December 2017
- Preceded by: Party founded
- Succeeded by: Party dissolved

Personal details
- Born: Paul Martin Laurence Weston; 1965 (age 60–61)
- Party: Restore Britain (2026-present); UKIP (2010–11); British Freedom Party (2011–12); Liberty GB (2013–2017); For Britain

Paul Martin Laurence Weston (born 1965) is a British far-right politician and blogger.

Weston joined the UK Independence Party (UKIP) in 2010 and stood as a parliamentary candidate for Cities of London and Westminster. In 2011, Weston left UKIP and joined the now-defunct British Freedom Party with members of the English Defence League (EDL) and former members of the British National Party (BNP). From 2013, he was the chairman of Liberty GB before the party was dissolved in December 2017; he recommended that its members join For Britain. He was the leader of Pegida UK in 2016.

For Liberty GB, Weston was a candidate for South East England in the 2014 European election and for Luton South in the 2015 general election. He obtained 158 votes (0.4%).

Weston is the former President of the English branch of the International Free Press Society, which was founded in 2009. His writings have frequently been featured on the blog Gates of Vienna.

== First partisan forays ==
When interviewed in 2010 as a member of UKIP, Weston described himself as a "natural Conservative" and described immigration as the "ethnic cleansing of the English". At the time Weston was standing as the UKIP candidate for Cities of London and Westminster in the UK general election of 2010. With a 1.8% share of the vote Weston finished in fifth place. The Conservative candidate, Mark Field, won the seat with 19,264 votes.

Soon after leaving UKIP, in 2011 Weston became the chairman of the British Freedom Party (BFP) the same year after he had been asked to do so by the activists who had broken away from the BNP in October 2010 to found a new party. As chairman of the BFP, Weston attended an international counter-jihad conference in September 2011. In an interview, Weston cited a poll conducted by Searchlight, which had found that 48% of the British public would support an anti-immigrant party, so long as the party did not take on explicitly fascist regalia and was non-violent, as evidence for an electoral basis for the BFP. This was in the midst of a crisis within the BNP and Weston held meetings with Andrew Brons, an MEP, and longstanding figure on the far-right, who was vying for the leadership of the party. Ultimately, Weston left the BFP saying, "I joined the British Freedom Party in late 2011, but became disillusioned with the direction it was taking, over which I had little control."

In November 2012, the BFP officially announced that it had agreed to enter into a formal political alliance with the English Defence League. In October 2012, the party failed to hand-in its annual registration form and pay the fee of £25 and, in December of the same year, was deregistered by the Electoral Commission. The deregistration was statutory rather than voluntary. Searchlight speculated that Weston let the party's registration lapse because Jim Dowson of Britain First had initiated legal action against the BFP for defamation over claims made against Britain First's leadership on the BFP website. The advocacy group Hope not Hate has said that Weston has attended and addressed numerous gatherings and rallies for such groups as Bloc Identitaire in France, Die Freiheit in Germany and the Jewish Defence League in Canada.

== Liberty GB ==
In March 2013, Weston founded the political party Liberty GB. The group was criticised as "old fascist rubbish" in a 2013 article by Sonia Gable published in Searchlight. Gable ranked the group alongside the British Democratic Party, Britain First and the National Front. Weston responded and accused his critics at Searchlight of being "a communist front operation disguised as an anti-fascist organisation". Weston has characterised himself as an "Islamo-realist" and is against Muslim people being able to hold public office in the United Kingdom. He has made a video in which he says "I am a racist". In an interview, the BBC's Andrew Neil brought up the subject of this video and asked him, "Do you regard yourself as a racist?" Weston responded, "No I don't, no." Weston said that he was indignant about the gang rape that took place in Rotherham and Rochdale and the fact that people sometimes fear being labeled racist, stating: "If you watch the entire video, it is actually making the point that you cannot be quiet about what's going on because you're afraid of one word. It is better to speak out and be honest."

The other Liberty GB candidates in the South East England 2014 election were Enza Ferreri and Jack Buckby. In 2012, Buckby founded the "National Culturists" while at university in Liverpool. At the time, Buckby was a member of the BNP and received support from Nick Griffin after he and his group were prevented from advertising themselves at the freshers' fair by anti-fascist demonstrators. Buckby was later invited to speak at the Alliance of European National Movements and introduced by Griffin.

At the 2015 general election, Weston contested Luton South for Liberty GB and polled 158 votes (0.4%).

=== Arrest ===
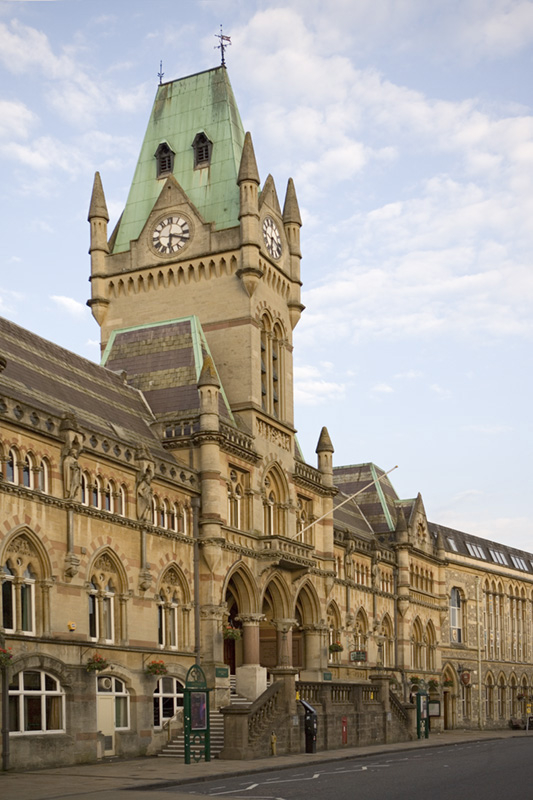
Steps of Winchester Guildhall on which Weston was arrested.

On 26 April 2014, Weston was arrested on the steps of the Winchester Guildhall for failing to comply with a dispersal notice issued under section 27 of the Violent Crime Reduction Act 2006 as he was reading out a passage from Winston Churchill's 1899 book The River War that is critical of Islam. He had been reported to the police by a member of the public after they had asked him if he had permission to give the speech and he replied that he did not. At the police station Weston was then rearrested for a racially aggravated offence under section 4 of the Public Order Act 1986, compounded with a Crime and Disorder Act 1998 section 31 racially aggravated public order offence, and was bailed to return to Winchester Police on 24 May.

=== Aftermath of arrest ===
In the days after, the story was picked up by news outlets. In The Telegraph, Daniel Hannan, a Conservative MEP for South East England, whom Weston was running against at the time, asked: "Why should it fall to me to defend him? Where are the lion-hearted liberals who are so quick to denounce political arrests in distant dictatorships? I realise that 'political arrest' is a strong phrase, but it's hard to think of any other way to describe a candidate for public office being taken into police custody because of objections to the content of his pitch."

Hampshire Police and Crime Commissioner Simon Hayes responded to the media coverage on the Hampshire Police and Crime Commission website, saying it was "wrongly suggested that Mr Weston was arrested for reciting passages written by Winston Churchill [...] he was not welcome outside the Winchester Guildhall, the Police were called and he was asked to move on." The statement added that he was "not prepared to move on and was arrested for this reason."

In 2016, Weston participated in a "counterjihad" panel at the annual Conservative Political Action Conference (CPAC) in the United States, sponsored by Frank Gaffney and the Center for Security Policy.

== Elections contested ==
=== UK Parliament elections ===
Date	Constituency	Party	Votes	%
2010	Cities of London and Westminster	UKIP	664	1.8
2015	Luton South	Liberty GB	158	0.4

=== European Parliament elections ===
Date	Constituency	Party	Votes	%	Note
2014	South East England	Liberty GB	2,494	0.1	Multi-member constituency. Other candidates: Enza Ferreri, Jack Buckby

== Views ==
The Guardian reported in 2015 that Weston has promoted the white genocide conspiracy theory. He said in 2013 that white genocide was occurring in Britain.

== Personal life ==
Weston's ex-wife is Romanian; they met in Romania.
