= British Freedom Party =

British far-right political party

- Chairman: Kevin Carroll
- Founded: October 2010
- Dissolved: December 2012 (de-registered)
- Split from: British National Party
- Headquarters: London
- Ideology: British nationalism; Euroscepticism; Islamophobia
- Political position: Far-right

The British Freedom Party (BFP) was a short-lived far-right political party in the United Kingdom. The party was registered on 18 October 2010. It was de-registered by the Electoral Commission in December 2012 after failing to return the annual registration form and £25 fee by the due date of 31 October 2012.

== Formation ==
The BFP was registered on 18 October 2010 by Paul Weston (party leader), George Whale (nominating officer) and Richard Bateman (treasurer). According to The Guardian it was created by "disgruntled members" of the British National Party (BNP). The chairman until January 2013 was Paul Weston, a former UK Independence Party candidate in Cities of London and Westminster. He described the party as "central" in orientation.

The BFP formed a pact with the English Defence League (EDL), whereby members of the latter could stand as election candidates under the British Freedom Party name, given suitable circumstances. It was announced in April 2012 that the EDL leader, Tommy Robinson, would be named deputy party leader. According to The Guardian he would focus on anti-Islamic strategies. Weston was replaced in early January 2013 by Kevin Carroll, former deputy leader of the EDL. Weston went on to found Liberty GB which put forward three candidates, including Weston, for the 2014 European election.

== Mission statement ==
The stated objectives of the British Freedom Party were "to defend and restore the freedoms, traditions, unity, identity, democracy and independence of the British people, to establish full sovereignty over all our national affairs by restoring the supremacy of the British Parliament, to withdraw from the European Union, to promote democratic British nationalist principles, to promote the social, economic, environmental and cultural interests of the British people and to preserve and promote the ancestral rights and liberties of the British people as defined in the British Constitution."

The party also had a 20 Point Plan on its main website, highlighting some of its key policies. They ranged from economic issues to social ones.

== Ideology ==
The British Freedom Party espoused what it called "cultural nationalism". Weston said in an interview that the founders of the British Freedom Party "believed that culture, not color, was the important thing in Britain especially multi-cultural Britain. We can have one culture and it's not important about what color or race you come from".

Stephen Tweed, the BFP's local party organiser for Kings Lynn and West Norfolk, objected in April 2012 to the creation of an Islamic centre in a former pub in King's Lynn, because it would be "exclusive, it will not be for the general public, it will be for Muslims only".

== Membership ==
According to the party's official return to the Electoral Commission, at the end of 2010 the party had 62 members. The report continues "Our membership to date is approximately 149", but no date is provided.

== Elections ==
In the 2012 local elections the British Freedom Party fielded six candidates, five of them in Liverpool. All polled very low, ranging from 0.6% of the vote to 4.2%. In Fazakerley, Peter Stafford received 50 votes, a 1.51% share of the total in that ward.

The party stood Kevin Carroll, the deputy leader of the EDL, in the November 2012 Police and Crime Commissioner election in Bedfordshire. He came fourth with 8,675 votes (10.6%), saving his deposit.
