= Anne Marie Waters =

Irish far-right politician (born 1977)

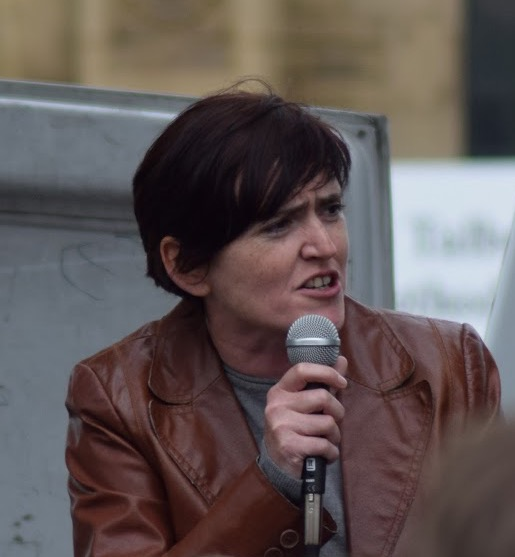
- Waters in 2016

Leader of For Britain
- In office October 2017 – July 2022
- Preceded by: Office established
- Succeeded by: Office abolished

Personal details
- Born: Anne Marie Dorothy Waters; 24 August 1977 (age 49) Dublin, Ireland
- Party: UKIP (2014–2017; 2023–present)
- Other political affiliations: Labour Party (2010–2014); For Britain (2017–2022)
- Education: Nottingham Trent University

Anne Marie Dorothy Waters (born 24 August 1977) is a far-right politician and activist in the United Kingdom. She founded and led the party For Britain until its dissolution in 2022. She is also the director of Sharia Watch UK, an organisation launched in April 2014. In January 2016, Waters launched Pegida UK in conjunction with far-right activist Tommy Robinson and politician and blogger Paul Weston.

Having unsuccessfully attempted to become a Labour Party parliamentary candidate, Waters joined the UK Independence Party (UKIP) and stood in its 2017 leadership election. She came second to Henry Bolton. She subsequently left UKIP to form her own party, For Britain, in October 2017. Following the dissolution of For Britain in 2022, Waters rejoined UKIP in 2023.

== Early life ==
Waters was born and raised in Dublin in Ireland, and went to school in Stoneybatter on the Northside of the city. She became an au pair in Germany during her teens. After living in the Netherlands, she studied journalism at Nottingham Trent University in England, graduating in 2003, and gained a law degree in London while working as a secretary in the NHS. She also belonged to One Law for All, a pressure group that opposed the spread of sharia courts. Waters is a lesbian in a civil partnership, and, although born and raised in Ireland, has described herself as "passionately, loyally, resolutely and proudly British".

== Political career ==
Waters unsuccessfully stood for the Labour Party in the 2010 Lambeth London Borough Council election for Streatham Hill ward. She made two unsuccessful attempts to be selected as a Labour parliamentary candidate, in South Swindon, then, in 2013, she was one of two people shortlisted to stand for Labour in Brighton Pavilion.

After leaving the Labour Party, Waters contested the Clapham Common ward for the UK Independence Party (UKIP) in the 2014 Lambeth Council election, where she finished in last place. At the 2015 general election, she stood as the UKIP candidate in Lewisham East, finishing in third place with 9.1% of the vote. During the campaign, she called for mass deportations, mosque closures and an end to immigration from majority-Muslim countries. She was initially chosen to stand as a UKIP candidate in the 2016 London Assembly election, but was deselected when her role in Pegida UK was announced. She stood for UKIP in the 2017 Essex County Council election, finishing in eighth place. Waters was selected to be the UKIP candidate for Lewisham East again in the 2017 general election, but was removed after party leader Paul Nuttall described her views as "way above and beyond party policy".

Following Nuttall's resignation as party leader, Waters announced her intention to stand in the 2017 UKIP leadership election. She planned to launch her campaign in Rotherham, leading to concerns among local UKIP branch members that the choice to hold it there was political opportunism. Rotherham football club cancelled her planned stadium rally and her launch took place instead at Dalton parish hall. UKIP's Rotherham branch released a statement calling for members to boycott the campaign launch with the backing of MEP Jane Collins after their concerns were ignored by Waters's team. UKIP's National Executive Committee urged members to "think very carefully" before participating in her campaign launch. In early July, over a thousand new members had joined the party in two weeks, leading to accusations of far-right infiltration in support of Waters. Jack Buckby, a former member of the British National Party and Liberty GB, described himself as "basically [her] campaign manager".

Waters predicted several times she would have difficulties in being allowed to stand, but on 11 August she passed UKIP's vetting procedure and was allowed to stand as a leadership candidate. Waters said she would not be opposed to Tommy Robinson joining UKIP, and eighteen of the party's twenty MEPs vowed to leave if she won the leadership. On 29 September 2017, it was announced that Henry Bolton had been elected leader, who had said the party risked becoming the "UK Nazi party" if it chose the wrong candidate, which was perceived as a criticism of Waters. Waters came second with 2,755 votes, a 21.3% share. She described the result as a victory of jihad against truth.

Waters later left UKIP to establish a new far-right political party called For Britain. Waters stood as a For Britain candidate in the Lewisham East by-election on 14 June 2018. She lost her deposit and finished in seventh place with 1.2% of the vote. The Electoral Commission records that the For Britain Movement was registered by Anna Maria Waters (not Anne Marie Waters) et al. In March 2021, she moved to Hartlepool and stood as a candidate in the 2021 Hartlepool Borough Council election for De Bruce ward. The ward had a For Britain councillor, one of the two elected in 2019. She lost the election, coming in sixth place with 10.7% of the vote. Later in 2021, she stood in the Batley and Spen by-election, with Robinson supporting her campaign; she finished twelfth out of sixteen candidates with 0.3% of the vote.

In July 2022, she was in St Helen's Square, York, with supporters from organisations including For Britain and Patriotic Alternative. Her speech was met by counter-protesters organised by York Stand Up To Racism. On 13 July 2022, she announced on the For Britain website that the party was ceasing operations immediately.

In April 2023, it was announced that she was rejoining UKIP as the "Justice spokes[person]", and the following month it was announced that she had been selected as the UKIP candidate for Hartlepool for the general election. She stood for election in the party's 2024 leadership election, though withdrew her candidacy during the campaign.

== Political views ==
Waters has been criticised for her association with far-right politicians and organisations, and has praised Geert Wilders and Marine Le Pen. HuffPost has pointed to her membership of the senior management of the anti-Islam group Pegida UK alongside Tommy Robinson, former leader of the English Defence League and Paul Weston, at the time leader of the ultranationalist Liberty GB. She has been described by Hope Not Hate as "heavily involved in the counter-jihad scene".

In an ITV documentary broadcast in November 2017, called "Undercover: Inside Britain's New Far Right", Waters advocated the reduction of Muslim birthrates, stopping Muslim immigration and accusing the EU of conspiring to turn Europe into an Islamic state. She later told ITV she opposed "racism, antisemitism, misogyny and the oppression usually associated with the far right". The documentary also revealed that a UKIP member who regularly attended Waters’ events was also a member of the white-nationalist group Generation Identity. Waters has since said that he was not a close associate and would not be welcome at future events. However, in 2019, she spoke at a Generation Identity conference, and said in her speech that mass immigration was being used to remove political power from white people. The speech was billed by its supporters as the "first great replacement speech by a UK politician".

Waters says she has been a gay rights activist since her days at university, and she considers herself to be a feminist. Waters is also an agnostic, and between November 2011 and June 2014 she was listed as a director of the National Secular Society. She had left the NSS by 2017.

She is the author of Beyond Terror: Islam's Slow Erosion of Western Democracy (2018) and In Defense of Democracy (2024).

== Elections contested ==
=== UK Parliament elections ===
Date	Constituency	Party	Votes	% votes	Place	Ref
2015 general election	Lewisham East	UKIP	3,886	9.1	3rd	
2018 by-election	Lewisham East	For Britain	266	1.2	7th	
2021 by-election	Batley and Spen	For Britain	97	0.3	12th	

=== Council elections ===
Date	Council	Ward	Party	Votes	% votes	Place	Ref
2010	Lambeth London Borough Council	Streatham Hill	Labour	2,001	11.3	4th	
2017	Essex County Council	Wickford Crouch	UKIP	850	10.0	8th	
2021	Hartlepool Borough Council	De Bruce	For Britain	479	10.7	6th	
