= 2021 Bolton Metropolitan Borough Council election =

2021 UK local government election

Bolton Metropolitan Council Election 2021
← 2019	6 May 2021	2022 →

20 Seats up for Election
	First party	Second party	Third party
Party	Conservative	Labour	Liberal Democrats
Seats before	18	18	7
Seats after	20	19	5
Seat change	▲2	▲1	▼2
Popular vote	30,255	27,517	7,562
Percentage	38.8%	35.3%	9.7%
	Fourth party	Fifth party	Sixth party
Party	Farnworth and Kearsley First	Horwich and Blackrod First	UKIP
Seats before	4	2	2
Seats after	5	3	1
Seat change	▲1	▲1	▼1
Popular vote	4,203	2,380	585
Percentage	5.4%	3.0%	0.7%
- Map showing the results of the 2021 Bolton Metropolitan Borough Council election
Leader of the Council before election
Conservative
Leader of the Council
Conservative

The 2021 Bolton Metropolitan Borough Council election to elect members of Bolton Metropolitan Borough Council took place on 6 May 2021, on the same day as other local elections.

21 seats were contested, including a by election in Astley Bridge Ward, following the death of Cllr Paul Wild. The Conservative Party won 10 seats, the Labour Party won 7 seats, Farnworth and Kearsley First won 2 seats, Horwich and Blackrod First won 1 seat, and the Liberal Democrats won 1 seat.

After the election, the total composition of the council was as follows:

- Conservative 20
- Labour 19
- Liberal Democrats 5
- Farnworth and Kearsley First 5
- Horwich and Blackrod First 3
- UK Independence Party 1
- Independents 7

== Election results ==
2021 Bolton Metropolitan Borough Council election
Party	This election			Full council			This election		
Party	Seats	Net	Seats %	Other	Total	Total %	Votes	Votes %	+/−
Conservative	10	▲2	50.0	10	20	33.3	30,255	38.8	▲9.4
Labour	7	▲1	35.0	12	19	32.0	27,517	35.3	▲3.1
Liberal Democrats	1	▼2	5.0	3	5	8.0	7,562	9.7	▼3.3
Farnworth and Kearsley First	2	▲1	10.0	4	5	8.0	4,203	5.4	▼1.7
Horwich and Blackrod First	1	▲1	5.0	2	3	5.0	2,380	3.0	▼1.2
UKIP	0	▼1	0.0	1	1	2.0	585	0.7	▼10.0
Green	0	Steady	0.0	0	0	0.0	3,168	4.1	▲1.0
Independent	0	Steady	0.0	0	0	0.0	1,698	2.2	New
Independent	0	Steady	0.0	0	0	0.0	655	0.8	▼1.3
For Britain	0	Steady	0.0	0	0	0.0	16	0.0	New

== Council composition ==
Prior to the election the composition of the council was:

↓
18	17	6	2	15
Labour	Conservative	LD	U	IND

After the election the composition of the council was:

↓
20	19	5	1	15
Conservative	Labour	LD	U	IND

LD - Liberal Democrats
U - UKIP
IND - Independent (politician)

== Ward results ==
Winning candidates are highlighted in bold.

=== Astley Bridge ===
Astley Bridge (2 seats)
Party	Candidate	Votes	%	±%
**Conservative**	**Hilary Fairclough**	**2,569**	**61.5**	**+22.1**
**Conservative**	**Samuel Rimmer**	**1,746**	**41.8**	**+2.4**
Labour	Safwaan Patel	1,025	24.5	+10.9
Labour	Steve Sutton	897	21.5	+7.9
Liberal Democrats	Kevin Mulligan	386	9.2	−23.0
Liberal Democrats	James Haslam	380	9.1	−23.1
Bolton for Change	Paul Eccleshare	311	7.4	+7.4
Majority		(Fairclough) 823		
Majority		(Rimmer) 721		
Turnout			40.0	
Conservative **hold**				
Conservative **hold**				

=== Bradshaw ward ===
Bradshaw ward
Party	Candidate	Votes	%	±%
**Conservative**	**Jacqueline Radcliffe**	**2,539**	**68.4**	**+12.8**
Labour	Logan Pratheepan	842	22.7	+9.0
Green	Steph Howes	214	5.6	+0.3
Liberal Democrats	Caroline Turner-Preece	96	2.6	−3.3
Majority		1,697	46.0	+2.0
Turnout		3,712	41.3	+3.2
Conservative **hold**		Swing	UKIP to Conservative 11.2	

=== Breightmet ward ===
Breightmet ward
Party	Candidate	Votes	%	±%
**Conservative**	**Stuart Hartigan**	**1,576**	**49.1**	**+7.9**
Labour	Bernadette Gallagher	1,222	38.1	+5.6
Bolton for Change	Sandy Holt	262	8.2	+8.2
Green	Chich Hewitt	86	2.7	−4.5
Liberal Democrats	Jennifer Wilkes	60	1.9	−1.0
Majority		354	11.0	+2.3
Turnout		3,228	33.2	−1.9
Conservative **gain** from Liberal Democrats		Swing	UKIP to BFC 10.4	

=== Bromley Cross ward ===
Bromley Cross ward
Party	Candidate	Votes	%	±%
**Conservative**	**Nadim Muslim**	**2,748**	**61.7**	**−0.8**
Labour	Emily Mort	1,261	28.3	+12.3
Green	Liz Spencer	282	6.3	−0.9
Liberal Democrats	Liz Turner	164	3.7	−2.2
Majority		1,487	33.4	−13.0
Turnout		4,455	42.8	+2.9
Conservative **hold**		Swing	UKIP to Labour 10.3	

=== Crompton ward ===
Crompton ward
Party	Candidate	Votes	%	±%
**Labour**	**Rabiya Jiva**	**2,266**	**54.6**	**+4.1**
Conservative	Siraj Patel	1,319	31.8	+1.6
Bolton for Change	Tracy Fenton	281	6.8	+6.8
Liberal Democrats	Francine Godfrey	158	3.8	−0.0
Green	Heather Rylance	124	3.0	−1.0
Majority		947	22.8	+2.5
Turnout		4,148	36.4	−1.7
Labour **gain** from Independent		Swing	UKIP to BFC 9.1	

=== Farnworth ward ===
Farnworth ward
Party	Candidate	Votes	%	±%
**Farnworth and Kearsley First**	**Paul Sanders**	**1,647**	**49.6**	**−3.3**
Labour	Nadeem Ayub	1,335	40.2	+4.2
Conservative	Bashim Dean	279	8.4	+4.9
Liberal Democrats	Christine McPherson	61	1.8	+0.4
Majority		312	9.4	−7.3
Turnout		3,322	30.4	−3.3
Farnworth and Kearsley First **hold**		Swing	UKIP to Conservative 4.9%	

=== Great Lever ward ===
Great Lever ward
Party	Candidate	Votes	%	±%
**Labour**	**Mohammed Iqbal**	**2,133**	**58.0**	**+6.3**
Conservative	Nalik Nazar	1,190	32.3	−1.3
Green	David Figgins	223	6.0	+1.5
Liberal Democrats	Duncan McPherson	134	3.6	+0.8
Majority		943	25.6	+7.5
Turnout		3,680	38.5	+0.0
Labour **hold**		Swing	UKIP to Labour 6.8	

=== Halliwell ward ===
Halliwell ward
Party	Candidate	Votes	%	±%
**Labour**	**Kate Lewis**	**2,113**	**73.4**	**+9.8**
Conservative	Malaika Dean	529	18.4	+5.1
Green	Christopher Taylor	103	3.6	−1.4
Independent	Anthony Massey	79	2.7	−0.5
Liberal Democrats	Colin Newall	55	1.9	−2.3
Majority		1,584	55.0	+3.0
Turnout		2,879	31.2	+0.3
Labour **hold**		Swing	UKIP to Labour 10.2	

=== Harper Green ward ===
Harper Green ward
Party	Candidate	Votes	%	±%
**Labour**	**Champak Mistry**	**1,565**	**44.9**	**−1.6**
Conservative	Fred Khan	922	26.4	+17.5
Farnworth and Kearsley First	Peter Flitcroft	777	22.3	−6.6
Green	Wendy Shepherd	128	3.7	+0.8
Bolton for Change	Paul Gannon	54	1.5	+1.5
Liberal Democrats	Jeleh Hayes	39	1.1	−0.5
Majority		643	18.4	+0.8
Turnout		3,485	34.2	+2.6
Labour **hold**		Swing	UKIP to Conservative 12.9	

=== Heaton and Lostock ward ===
Heaton and Lostock ward
Party	Candidate	Votes	%	±%
**Conservative**	**Andy Morgan**	**2,799**	**57.0**	**+2.8**
Labour	John Gillatt	1,419	28.9	+5.0
Liberal Democrats	Sue Priest	488	9.9	−0.3
Green	Katie Jones	205	4.2	−1.1
Majority		1,380	28.1	−2.1
Turnout		4,911	45.9	+5.4
Conservative **hold**		Swing	UKIP to Labour 5.7	

=== Horwich and Blackrod ward ===
Horwich and Blackrod ward
Party	Candidate	Votes	%	±%
**Horwich and Blackrod First**	**David Grant**	**1,303**	**33.0**	**−4.4**
Conservative	Finlay Stanley	1,288	32.6	+7.9
Labour	Joan Pritchard-Jones	1,130	28.6	+2.3
Green	Andrew Bovill	149	3.8	+0.5
Liberal Democrats	Kevin Walsh	80	2.0	−1.3
Majority		15	11.1	−10.7
Turnout		3,950	36.2	−2.0
Horwich and Blackrod First **gain** from Independent		Swing	UKIP to Conservative 6.4	

=== Horwich North East ward ===
Horwich North East ward
Party	Candidate	Votes	%	±%
**Labour Co-op**	**Richard Silvester**	**1,412**	**35.2**	**+13.2**
Horwich and Blackrod First	Ryan Bamforth	1,077	26.8	−10.7
Liberal Democrats	Gordon Stone	794	19.8	−3.7
Conservative	Hannah Wright	618	15.4	+6.6
Green	Keith Cocker	117	2.9	−1.4
Majority		335	8.4	
Turnout		4,018	40.3	−2.8
Labour Co-op **hold**		Swing	HBF to Labour 11.9	

=== Hulton ward ===
Hulton ward
Party	Candidate	Votes	%	±%
**Conservative**	**Toby Hewitt**	**1,695**	**44.9**	**−1.7**
Labour	Shafaqat Shaikh	1,075	28.4	−5.0
Green	Paris Hayes	860	22.8	+17.6
Bolton for Change	Jeff Armstrong	77	2.0	+2.0
Liberal Democrats	Matt Allen	67	1.8	−1.7
Majority		620	16.4	+3.1
Turnout		3,774	37.2	+2.2
Conservative **hold**		Swing	UKIP to Green 14.4	

=== Kearsley ward ===
Kearsley ward
Party	Candidate	Votes	%	±%
**Farnworth and Kearsley First**	**Tracey Wilkinson**	**1,779**	**52.3**	**−15.4**
Conservative	Mark Cunningham	600	17.6	+12.1
Labour	Abdul Atcha	528	15.5	+0.4
Liberal Democrats	Debbie Newall	493	14.5	+10.9
Majority		1,179	34.7	−17.9
Turnout		3,400	32.4	−1.6
Farnworth and Kearsley First **gain** from Conservative		Swing	FKF to Conservative 13.7	

=== Little Lever and Darcy Lever ward ===
Little Lever and Darcy Lever ward
Party	Candidate	Votes	%	±%
**Conservative**	**Andrea Taylor-Burke**	**1,536**	**42.6**	**+12.8**
Labour	James Entwistle	1,095	30.4	+4.3
UKIP	Rees Gibbon	585	16.2	−23.1
Bolton for Change	Brett Varnam	179	5.0	+5.0
Green	Gillian Hewitt	148	4.1	+4.1
Liberal Democrats	Scott Turner-Preece	46	1.8	−2.8
For Britain	Simon Collins	16	0.4	+0.4
Majority		441	12.2	
Turnout		3,605	37.0	−0.2
Conservative **gain** from UKIP		Swing	UKIP to Conservative 12.9	

=== Rumworth ward ===
Rumworth ward
Party	Candidate	Votes	%	±%
**Labour**	**Shamim Abdullah**	**2,417**	**63.5**	**−9.3**
Conservative	Shafi Patel	1,100	28.9	+18.0
Green	Alan Johnson	196	5.1	−2.8
Liberal Democrats	David Cooper	90	2.3	+0.2
Majority		1,317	34.6	−27.3
Turnout		3,803	37.5	+1.9
Labour **hold**		Swing	Labour to Conservative 13.6	

=== Smithills ward ===
Smithills ward
Party	Candidate	Votes	%	±%
**Liberal Democrats**	**Roger Hayes**	**1,728**	**44.2**	**−8.0**
Labour	Sorie Seesay	986	25.2	+2.3
Conservative	Joan Johnson	883	22.9	+10.8
Bolton for Change	Daniel Bentham	177	4.5	+4.5
Green	David Ebbitt	134	3.4	+3.4
Majority		742	19.3	−10.0
Turnout		3,908	37.4	+1.4
Liberal Democrats **hold**		Swing	UKIP to Conservative 11.7	

=== Tonge with The Haulgh ward ===
Tonge with The Haulgh ward
Party	Candidate	Votes	%	±%
**Labour**	**Martin Donaghy**	**1,272**	**44.9**	**+2.7**
Conservative	Wesley McArdle	1,120	39.6	+11.8
Bolton for Change	Trevor Jones	357	12.6	+12.6
Liberal Democrats	Becky Forrest	81	2.9	−2.7
Majority		152	5.4	−9.0
Turnout		2,830	30.9	−0.4
Labour **hold**		Swing	UKIP to BFC 18.4	

=== Westhoughton North and Chew Moor ward ===
Westhoughton North and Chew Moor ward
Party	Candidate	Votes	%	±%
**Conservative**	**Andrea Finney**	**1,937**	**46.6**	**+14.9**
Liberal Democrats	Arthur Price	1,207	29.0	−10.0
Labour	Zulfi Jiva	652	15.7	+1.6
Westhoughton First Independent	Jack Speight	201	4.8	−3.1
Green	Amanda Stewart	107	2.6	+2.6
Active for Westhoughton	Richard Bates	52	1.2	+1.2
Majority		730	17.6	
Turnout		4,156	37.8	+0.5
Conservative **hold**		Swing	Lib Dem to Conservative 12.4	

=== Westhoughton South ===
Westhoughton South
Party	Candidate	Votes	%	±%
**Conservative**	**Christopher Hill**	**1,262**	**36.0**	**+16.8**
Liberal Democrats	Neil Maher	955	27.3	−5.8
Labour	Mike Jarvis	871	24.9	+0.5
Westhoughton First	Richard Brennan	194	5.5	−5.4
Active for Westhoughton	Victoria Rowley	129	3.7	+3.7
Green	Elizabeth McManus	92	2.6	+2.6
Majority		307	8.7	
Turnout		3,503	35.2	+0.5
Conservative **hold**		Swing	UKIP to Conservative 15.0	
