= Ann Barnes (police commissioner) =

Retired British police commissioner

Kent Police and Crime Commissioner
- In office 22 November 2012 – 11 May 2016
- Preceded by: Office created
- Succeeded by: Matthew Scott

Chairman of Kent Police Authority
- In office 2005–2012
- Succeeded by: Mike Hill

Personal details
- Born: June 1945 (age 80) St Helens, Merseyside, England
- Party: Independent
- Spouse: Tony Barnes
- Profession: Teacher

Ann Christine Barnes (born June 1945) is a retired British police commissioner who was the first Kent Police and Crime Commissioner. She previously chaired the Kent Police Authority for six years and was deputy chair of the National Association of Police Authorities for three years.

== Early life and family ==
Barnes was born in St. Helens in 1945 but now lives in Lyminge. She is married to Tony Barnes and has two children. She worked as a teacher for 27 years in Merseyside and Kent. She became a magistrate on the East Kent Bench in 1986.

== Kent police authority ==
Barnes was appointed as an independent member of the Kent Police Authority (KPA) in 2001, becoming its chairman in 2005. A police authority in the United Kingdom is a public authority that is responsible for overseeing the operations of a police force.

In 2010 Spending Review, the coalition government cut funding to Kent Police by £53 m (20%) which resulted in 1,500 police personnel, including 500 police officers, being made redundant across the county.

In 2011, Barnes was "reminded of her responsibilities" by the KPA when she broke impartiality rules by campaigning against the government's introduction of elected police and crime commissioners across the country, describing the policy as "naive and disastrous" and "a willful waste of money" that would "inevitably lead towards a confrontational model of governance."

== Kent Police and Crime Commissioner ==
=== Campaign ===
Despite her opposition to the creation of the post, Barnes announced in July 2012 that she was going to contest the police and crime commissioner election in November 2012 as an independent candidate. She subsequently resigned from KPA with effect from 10 August 2012.

Barnes spent nearly £68,000 on her campaign, of which £50,000 was from a legacy left by her parents. During the campaign Barnes threatened legal action against English Democrats candidate Steve Uncles over a tweet Uncles posted about Barnes' funding. Barnes' opponents alleged that the Liberal Democrats backed her campaign but she denied the allegations. Her campaign manager was Peter Carroll, a former parliamentary candidate for the Liberal Democrats in Maidstone and The Weald and, twice previously, in Folkestone and Hythe.

The election took place on 15 November 2012. On a turnout of just 16.3%, Barnes was in first place after the first round of counting, receiving 95,901 votes (46.80%) – over 40,000 more than the second placed candidate, Conservative politician Craig Mackinlay. She was declared the winner after the second round of counting, receiving 114,137 votes (65.45%) – over 50,000 more than the second placed candidate, Mackinlay.

Barnes was sworn into the £85,000-per-year police and crime commissioner role on 22 November 2012 at a ceremony held at Kent Police College in Maidstone.

=== Youth PCC ===
In April 2013, Barnes appointed 17-year-old Paris Brown as the UK's first Youth Police and Crime Commissioner, with a job of representing the views of young people in relation to policing in Kent. Brown soon faced calls to resign when news reports said she had used her Twitter account to allegedly post offensive comments. Brown issued an apology and resigned from the position as she felt that she could no longer serve the role justice due to the media attention, saying that she was "quitting in the interests of the young people of Kent".

Following Brown's departure, Kerry Boyd, 20, was appointed Kent youth crime commissioner. The Sun newspaper disclosed a 'close friendship' between Boyd and a married former Conservative councillor; Boyd was suspended in June 2014. Barnes said that she supported Boyd but would not comment further while enquiries were taking place. Following Boyd's suspension there were calls for Barnes's resignation by Conservative MP Roger Gale and Conservative member of the Kent police and crime scrutiny panel Andrew Bowles. The role was replaced by a Youth Advisory Group, which was made up of the local Kent County Youth Council, and the Medway Youth Parliament.

=== Takes over the Police Force's communications functions ===
In April 2014, it emerged that Barnes had transferred the Kent Police communications staff to report to her rather than the Chief Constable. Local councillors issued a statement saying "This is the police and crime commissioner's most political move since she took office and we do not believe that it will turn out to be in the best interests of the people of Kent and Medway." The decision also came under fire from COPACC, an independent group that scrutinises and monitors the work of crime commissioners. Mrs Barnes presented the change as an administrative one that was related to legislation about commissioners, rather than being intended to increase her own public relations capacity.

=== "Meet the Police Commissioner" documentary ===
In May 2014, a major controversy developed over a fly-on-the-wall television documentary in which Barnes agreed to take part. Meet the Police Commissioner was broadcast on Channel 4 on 29 May 2014 and was widely perceived to be a public relations disaster. The programme was described as "farcical" and "car crash television" and Barnes herself was labelled as "bumbling" and compared to David Brent. She was criticised by members of her scrutiny body, the Police and Crime Panel, who described taking part in the documentary as "ill-advised" and said it brought the "whole force into disrepute."

Kent Police distanced itself from the programme and the chair of the Kent Police Federation said that Barnes had turned Kent Police into "a laughing stock". Barnes said that "it was never my intention to draw adverse publicity to the excellent work being carried out by officers and staff in often very difficult circumstances".

=== 2016 election ===
On 12 March 2016, Barnes announced in a blog post that she would not be standing reelection. She stated "Fifteen years – including, since 2012, service in this intense and all-consuming role – is probably long enough, and I am content that I have delivered what I said I would", adding that Kent Police was in "a very strong and sustainable position for the future".

Barnes retired on 12 May 2016, when the new PCC, Conservative Matthew Scott, was sworn in.
