= Zarathustra (horse) =

Irish-bred Thoroughbred racehorse

- Sire: Persian Gulf
- Grandsire: Bahram
- Dam: Salvia
- Damsire: Sansovino
- Sex: Stallion
- Foaled: 1951
- Country: Ireland
- Colour: Black
- Breeder: Harold Stannus Gray
- Owner: Terence James Stannus Gray
- Trainer: Michael Hurley; Cecil Boyd-Rochfort
- Record: 13 wins
- Earnings: £33,337

Major wins
- Irish Derby (1954); Desmond Plate (1954); Irish St. Leger (1954); Royal Whip Stakes (1955); Goodwood Cup (1956); Ascot Gold Cup (1957)
- Last updated on 2008·06·26

Zarathustra (1951–1967) was an Irish-bred Thoroughbred racehorse and sire. He won races over distances ranging from five furlongs to two and a half miles, but was especially effective over extended distances.

== Background ==
Zarathustra was bred by Sir Harold Gray at Graymount in County Antrim, Northern Ireland in 1951. When Gray died later the same year, the ownership of his horses, including the black foal who would become known as Zarathustra passed to his son, the writer and philosopher Terence Gray (Wei Wu Wei). Gray declined several offers to buy the colt and sent him to be trained in Ireland by Michael Hurley.

== Racing career ==
=== 1953–1956: Ireland ===
Unusually for a future champion stayer, Zarathustra demonstrated precocious speed, winning three times as a two-year-old over the minimum distance of five furlongs. The most important of these was the Blake Plate at Phoenix Park. In 1954 he was one of the best horses in Ireland, winning the Irish Derby and the Irish St. Leger as well as the Desmond Plate at the Curragh. Following his win in the Irish Derby, Gray reportedly turned down an offer of £20,000 for the horse. As a four-year-old Zarathustra won the Royal Whip Stakes.

=== 1956–1957: Britain ===
After one unsuccessful run in early 1956 he was transferred to England where he was trained at Newmarket, Suffolk by Cecil Boyd-Rochfort. By the end of the season he had won four races in Britain including the Ascot Stakes (by five lengths) and the Goodwood Cup. In 1957 Zarathustra sustained a fracture to his cannon bone which threatened his racing career. After spending two months recuperating in his stable he returned to the racecourse to run in the Ascot Gold Cup. The stable jockey, Harry Carr preferred to ride the Queen's runner Atlas, leaving Zarathustra to be ridden by Lester Piggott. After racing just behind the leaders, Zarathustra took the lead early in the straight and won the race by one and a half lengths from the St Leger winner Cambremer.

Bapsybanoo Pavry, the former Marchioness of Winchester and a Parsee, protested that the horse's being named after the prophet Zarathustra was offensive to her religion and ought to be changed.

== Assessment ==
Zarathustra was given a best end of year Timeform rating of 131 in 1956, when he was the third highest rated horse trained in Britain.

== Stud record ==
Zarathustra returned to Ireland to stand as a stallion. The best of his offspring was Crozier, a stayer like his sire, who won the Doncaster Cup. He was exported to Japan in 1964 and died there in 1967.

== Sire line tree ==
- Zarathustra
  - Zaleucus
    - Reprieve
    - Zell
  - Crozier
