= Bapsybanoo Pavry =

Bapsybanoo ("Bapsy") Paulet, Marchioness of Winchester, née Pavry (1902 – 6 September 1995), was an Indian socialite and aristocrat.

== Early life ==
She was born Bapsybanoo Pavry of Bombay, the daughter of the Parsi Zoroastrian "Head Priest", the Most Rev. Cursetji Erachji Pavry (also spelled as Khurshedji). Her brother, Dr. Jal Pavry, and she travelled extensively, visiting Germany, Italy, Belgium, Greece, and Egypt, where they were received by Adolf Hitler, Pope Pius XI, Benito Mussolini as well as the respective monarchs of Belgium, Greece, Iran, Afghanistan and Egypt. In England she was received by King George V and Queen Mary. She received an MA from Columbia University after initial schooling at St. Xavier's College in Bombay.

She lived in England from a young age, where she pursued a "campaign to become one of the great figures of the age" by breaking into English high society. She was painted several times by Augustus John, including in 1930, and was the subject of an essay by Duncan Fallowell.

Pavry and her brother Jal, also attended the Paris Peace Conference of the victorious Allies after the end of World War I. Sri Lankan writer H. A. J Hulugalle described her as the 'glamour girl' of the conference and mentions she was sitting in the gallery near to Ho Chi Minh.

== Marchioness of Winchester ==
In 1952, she married Henry Paulet, 16th Marquess of Winchester and became the Marchioness of Winchester, thought to be the only Indian Marchioness in history. Her husband, the childless widower Marquess, was ninety years old at the time. The Marquess left Pavry within weeks of the marriage for his former fiancée Eve Fleming, the mother of Ian Fleming, the James Bond author, and a former lover of Augustus John. (After a brief engagement, Eve Fleming had refused to marry the Marquess because on remarriage she would have lost the substantial allowance granted in her late husband's will). In 1957 the Marchioness sued Mrs Fleming alleging that she had enticed the Marquess away, but despite initial success the decision was overturned in Mrs Fleming's favour on appeal. The Marquess lived out the remainder of his life in Monte Carlo with Eve Fleming, dying four months before his centenary in 1962.

The Marchioness lived for a short time in the medieval surroundings of the Winchester house near Southampton but after separating from her husband, left to live in London. In 1956 and 1957, she protested that the name of the racehorse Zarathustra was offensive to her religion and ought to be changed.

In the 1960s, the Marchioness had an audience with the Shah of Iran, which was used to persuade him to allow maintenance of the ancient Zoroastrian sites of worship in Iran.

== Later life ==
After the death of her brother Jal in 1985, the Marchioness returned to India and lived out the rest of her life there, dying in 1995.

She was active in global Zoroastrian affairs, using her status to petition the Iranian government to improve the status of the persecuted Iranian Zoroastrians.

== Legacy ==
After the death of her brother in 1985, the Marchioness established the Dasturdaza Dr. Jal Pavry Award for International Peace and Understanding at Columbia University's School of International and Public Affairs in memory of her brother, Dr. Jal Pavry. The fund provides an award to students at SIPA for the best paper on the topic of international peace and understanding. She also established two fellowships at Oxford University in her name and that of her brother.

Despite living in England for most of her adult life, she only visited Winchester once, immediately after her marriage in 1952, but felt snubbed as few people welcomed her, and never returned. Nevertheless, on her death she bequeathed £500,000 to the town of Winchester to be used to build a community centre in the grounds of the Winchester Guildhall in her name so that the community would be forced to acknowledge her. Winchester City Council struggled to carry out the bequest for 14 years, by which time the sum had grown to £1.4 million. Finally, in June 2009, a room in the Guildhall was refurbished and renamed after her with a huge portrait of her in her state robes by Frank Salisbury taking pride of place.
