= Liberty GB =

British far-right political party

Liberty Great Britain
- Chairman: Paul Weston
- Founded: March 2013
- Dissolved: November 2017
- Merged into: For Britain
- Headquarters: Regent Street, London
- Ideology: Hard Euroscepticism; Right-wing populism; National conservatism; Social conservatism
- Political position: Far-right

Website
- libertygb.org.uk (archive)

Liberty Great Britain or Liberty GB was a minor far-right British nationalist political party founded and led by Paul Weston that described itself as "counter-jihad".

Liberty GB was anti-immigration, anti-Islamic and traditionalist. The group's Facebook page described it as "patriotic counter-jihad party for Christian civilisation, Western rights and freedoms, British culture, animal welfare and capitalism".

== History ==
=== Foundation by Paul Weston ===
Paul Weston, the founder, was a former member of the UK Independence Party (UKIP) and was that party's candidate in Cities of London and Westminster at the 2010 general election. He left UKIP over what he described as its failure to address issues related to Islam in Britain, and took over the British Freedom Party (BFP) from Peter Mullins. That party formed an alliance with the far-right English Defence League. Weston left the BFP in 2013. He has predicted that within 20 years there will be a war in Britain between the white working class and immigrants. He is married to a Romanian and claims to have been a deep sea diver, a pilot in Africa and a property developer in the Czech Republic.

It was registered with the Electoral Commission by Weston and George Whale on 5 March 2013.

=== 2014 European election ===
Liberty GB stood three candidates in the 2014 European Parliament election in the South East England constituency: Weston, Enza Ferreri (Liberty GB's media officer) and Jack Buckby (Liberty GB's outreach officer). Buckby founded the "National Culturists" while at university in Liverpool in 2012. Its three candidates received 2,414 votes (0.11%), placing it 14th of the 15 parties contesting the election.

=== 2014 Paul Weston arrest ===
On 26 April 2014, Weston was arrested while addressing passers-by outside Winchester Guildhall. A member of the public complained to police and he was detained after failing to move on under a dispersal order. He was further arrested on suspicion of religious or racial harassment. Weston's speech quoted from Winston Churchill's 1899 book, The River War, about Churchill's experiences as a British army officer in Sudan; the passage quoted was critical of Islam. Weston is a former UKIP candidate who left that party over what he described as its failure to address issues related to Islam in Britain, and then joined the British Freedom Party.

=== 2014 Tim Burton radio host trial ===
Tim Burton, a radio presenter who was a member of Liberty GB, was acquitted of charges of racially aggravated harassment on 4 May 2014 at Birmingham magistrates' court. He had tweeted comments about Fiyaz Mughal OBE, a Muslim campaigner of Tell MAMA UK.

=== 2016 Batley and Spen by-election ===
Following the killing of the incumbent Labour MP Jo Cox, Liberty GB contested the Batley and Spen by-election (the Conservative Party, Liberal Democrats, Green Party and UKIP declined to contest it). The party's candidate was Jack Buckby, who was a member of the youth division of the British National Party (BNP) under Nick Griffin before leaving the party. He says he left because he believed that the BNP was too racist. Buckby polled just over 1% of the vote; he lost his deposit, as did all the candidates except the winner, the Labour candidate Tracy Brabin.

=== Dissolution by Paul Weston ===
Paul Weston dissolved the party in November 2017, choosing instead to back Anne Marie Waters' new party, For Britain.

== Electoral performance ==
=== General election, 7 May 2015 ===
The party contested three constituencies, obtaining a total of 418 votes.

Constituency	Candidate	Votes	%
Birmingham Ladywood	Timothy Burton	216	0.6
Lewisham West and Penge	George Whale	44	0.1
Luton South	Paul Weston	158	0.4

=== 2016 Batley and Spen by-election ===
Constituency	Candidate	Votes	%
Batley and Spen	Jack Buckby	220	1.1

== See also ==
- Pegida UK
- English Defence League
