= Matthew Scott (police commissioner) =

English politician

Kent Police and Crime Commissioner
- Incumbent
- Assumed office 12 May 2016
- Preceded by: Ann Barnes

Personal details
- Party: Conservative

Matthew Richard Scott is an English politician, and the current Police and Crime Commissioner for Kent, representing the Conservative Party. He was elected to the post on 5 May 2016 and re-elected in 2021 and in 2024. Before his election to the role of police and crime commissioner he worked for Conservative MP David Evennett as his office manager, and served as a councillor in Bexley from 2006 to 2010. Scott, whose father and brother have both been serving police officers, was chosen as Kent Conservatives' PCC candidate in October 2015.
