= British nationalism =

Political ideology and movement in the United Kingdom

The Union Jack national flag of the United Kingdom, adopted in this version in 1801 bearing England's red cross with white border (England in 1801 included Wales within it), Ireland's Saint Patrick's Saltire with a white border, and Scotland's Saint Andrew's Saltire and blue background. This is a common symbol used by British nationalists.

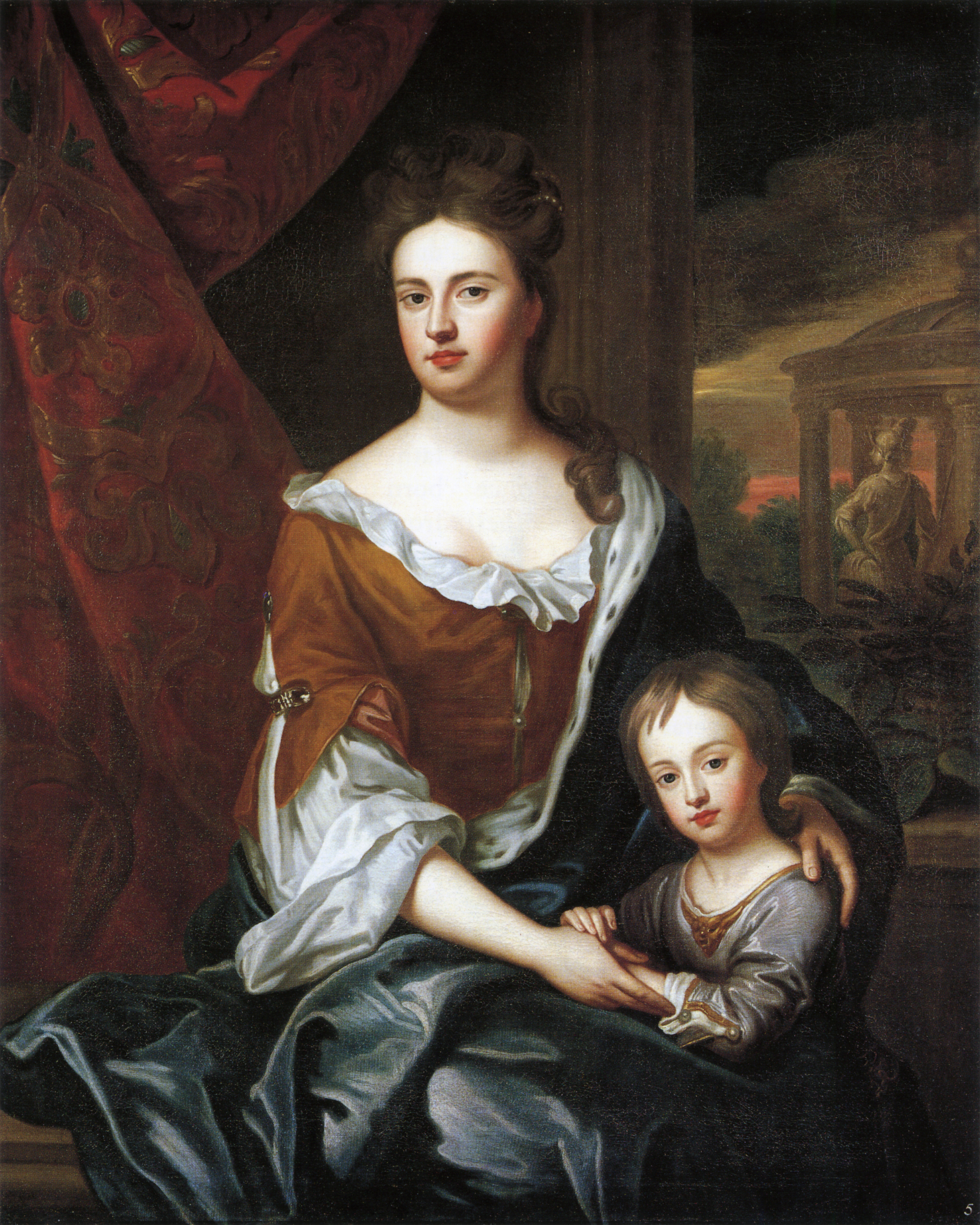
Queen Anne was the first known British monarch of the Kingdom of Great Britain (later the United Kingdom).

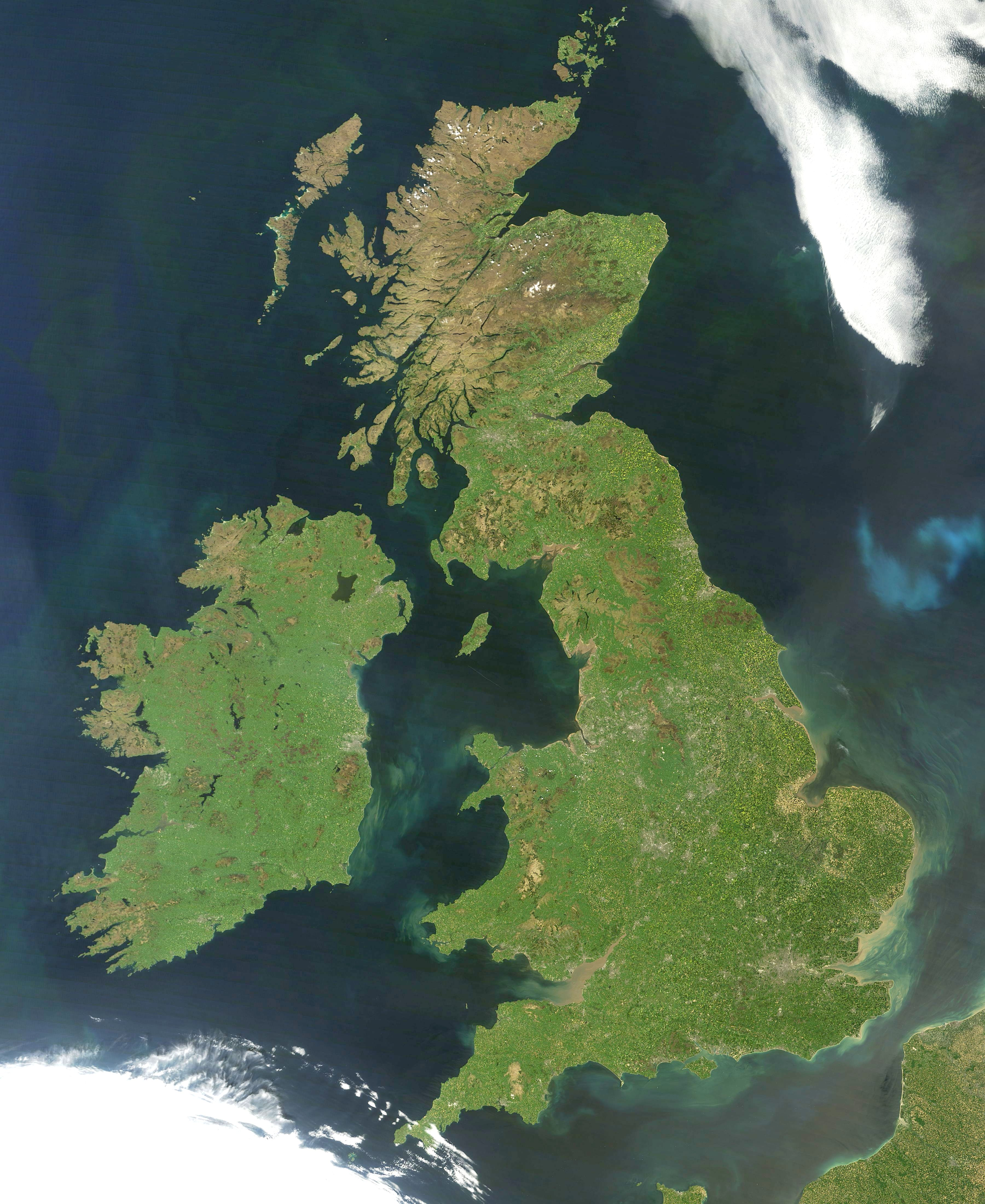
Satellite photograph of the islands Great Britain and Ireland. Originally British nationalism emphasized typically on the British Isles as a whole. British nationalism now typically emphasizes on the unity of most of the British isles, that includes Great Britain and Northern Ireland (excluding most of Ireland).

British nationalism asserts and promotes the unity of British people and much of the Anglosphere as a nation, advocating for the cultural unity of Britain, a definition of Britishness includes people of English, Scottish, Welsh, and Northern Irish/Irish descent. British nationalism is closely associated with British unionism, which seeks the continuation to uphold the political union that is the United Kingdom, or/and strengthen the links between the countries that makeup the one homogeneous unified nation-state of the United Kingdom.

British nationalism's unifying identity originally began from the ancient Britons who dwelt on the island of Great Britain. British nationalism grew to include people outside Great Britain, such as in Ireland, because of the 1542 Crown of Ireland Act, which declared that the crown of Ireland was to be held by the ruling monarch of England as well as because of Anglo-Irish calls for unity with Britain.

It is characterised as a "powerful but ambivalent force in British politics". In its moderate form, British nationalism has been a form of civic nationalism, emphasising on both the cohesion and diversity of the people that live within the United Kingdom, its dependencies, and its former British colonies. However, nativist ethnic nationalism has arisen based on concerns relating to immigration; this anti-immigrant nativist nationalism has manifested politically in the British National Party and other nativist nationalist movements. Politicians, such as former British prime minister David Cameron, have sought to promote British nationalism as a progressive cause.

== History ==
During the Industrial Revolution, Britain saw the rise of an integrated national economy and a unified public sphere, where British people began to mobilise on a state-wide scale, rather than just in the smaller units of their province, town, or family. This period also marked Britain's emergence as the first global policeman, with the world's first major modern navy and its capital city of London establishing itself as the foremost global financial centre. The early emergence of a popular patriotic nationalism took place in the mid-18th century and was actively promoted by the British government, as well as writers and intellectuals. National symbols, anthems, myths, flags and narratives were widely adopted. The Union Jack was adopted in 1801 as the national flag.

The expansion of the British Empire was accompanied by the awakening of British nationalism. Following the Second World War, certain segments of British nationalists opposed European integration and the United Kingdom's membership of the European Economic Community.

== Commentary ==
Godfried van Benthem van den Bergh in 1966 noted that British nationalism had tended to lack the overt aggression seen in other nationalist movements, instead marked by confidence, a sense of dignity, and some arrogance. He also suggested that the British public rarely identified explicitly as nationalists, favouring patriotism separately instead.

James Foley in 2023 wrote that, while philosophical nationalism has often centred the inherent diversity of human cultures, British nationalism in its post-Thatcher form focused less on a perceived inherent difference and more on the historic superiority of its liberal traditions and therefore its perceived capacity for international leadership.

In Britons: Forging the Nation 1707–1837, Linda Colley closes by suggesting that the influences that had originally bonded Britons are now largely gone, and that these have led to a resurgence of English, Scottish, Welsh, and Irish identity.

Andrew Black and Luisa Borras in 2021 posited that rising separatist nationalism in the British Devolved Nations has created tension with British nationalists. Where British nationalism is closely identified with supporting the monarchy, the houses of parliament, the judiciary and other elements of the institutional status quo, support for these British institutions has been questioned in the devolved nations.

== Nationalism and unionism ==
Nowadays, as in the past, unionist movements exist in Scotland, Wales and Northern Ireland. Such movements seek specifically to retain the ties between the respective countries and the rest of the UK, in opposition to civic nationalist movements. Such unionist movements include the Ulster Unionist Party, Democratic Unionist Party and the Scottish Unionist Party. In Scotland and Wales, the Conservative, Labour, Liberal Democrat, Reform UK, and Restore Britain parties are in favour of maintaining the Union. British nationalists are generally supportive of unionism. Some argue that modern British nationalism has more right-wing associations tied to it, with it at times being described as xenophobic, whereas Scottish and Welsh nationalism are usually not viewed in the same way, rather being viewed as progressive.

== List of British nationalist parties ==
- Abolish the Scottish Parliament Party
- Abolish The Welsh Assembly Party
- Advance UK
- British Democratic Party (2013)
- Britain First
- British National Party
- Democratic Unionist Party
- Heritage Party
- Homeland Party
- National Front
- Patriotic Alternative
- Reform UK
- Traditional Unionist Voice
- UK Independence Party
- Restore Britain

== See also ==
- Britishness
- British unionism
- Civic nationalism
- Cornish nationalism
- English Defence League
- English nationalism
- Ethnic nationalism
- Far-right politics in the United Kingdom
- Irish nationalism
- Pan-Celticism
- Pan-Germanism
- Pan-nationalism
- Pegida UK
- Scottish nationalism
- Ulster nationalism
- Welsh nationalism
