= Ingrid Carlqvist =

Author, journalist, and far-right activist

- Born: Ingrid Kristina Carlqvist; 9 November 1960 (age 65) Stockholm, Sweden
- Occupation: Author and journalist

Ingrid Kristina Carlqvist (born 9 November 1960) is a Swedish author and former journalist. According to Expo and Hope not Hate, Carlqvist is a far-right extremist who has developed close ties to the white supremacist milieu in Sweden and abroad. Previously affiliated with the Islamophobic movement, she has recently shifted her focus to antisemitism and disavowed her former affiliations.

== Early life ==
Carlqvist was born on 9 November 1960 in Vantör Township, and was raised in Helsingborg. She studied at the School of Journalism in Gothenburg.

== Career ==
In 2009, Carlqvist was fired by the mainstream housing magazine Villaliv, and in 2011 she was fired by the local newspaper Barometern. According to Carlqvist, she was fired from Barometern for blogging in defense of the Sweden Democratic Youth, which at the time was the youth league of the Sweden Democrats.

In July 2012, she founded the Swedish language news-sheet Dispatch International with Lars Hedegaard, which was distributed by the Sweden Democrats as part of its election campaign. The publication's general theme was Islamophobia, and its stated purpose was, according to Carlqvist, "to report what was not being reported" in the Swedish mainstream media with regard to Third World mass immigration into Swedish society.

She was employed by the Gatestone Institute from 2015 until 2016, when she was fired for having expressed support for neo-Nazis, and also formerly wrote for the blog Gates of Vienna.

After having been affiliated with the counter-jihad movement, she had by 2016 shifted to becoming affiliated with white supremacist and antisemitic views, and neo-Nazi groups such as the Nordic Resistance Movement. Carlqvist has been described as engaging in Holocaust denial by Hope not Hate, and has disassociated herself from the counter-jihad movement, bemoaning its "Jewish funders". She stated to be a member of the white supremacist neo-pagan organization Asatru Folk Assembly in 2018.

In March 2017, Carlqvist was interviewed as an ''expert'' on Fox Business by Cheryl Casone. However, Fox never stated that she has an involvement in far-right and neo-Nazi politics. Carlqvist explained that Sweden has reached a ''critical mass'' of immigrants who ''don't love Sweden or the Swedish people''.

== Publications ==
- 2005 – Ego girl (with Carolina Gynning) ISBN 978-9172637306
- 2009 – Ego woman (with Carolina Gynning) ISBN 978-9150500875
- 2009 – Inte utan mina söner ISBN 978-9197738262
- 2009 – Ljusfolket (with Benny Rosenqvist) ISBN 978-9186587345
- 2010 – Keith och jag ISBN 978-9163364051
- 2010 – Mellan himmel och jord (with Benny Rosenqvist) ISBN 978-9153434597
- 2012 – Horungen (with Donya Wihbi) ISBN 978-9174610680
- 2012 – Mina år med Bin Ladens (with Catrin Streete) ISBN 978-9174611243
- 2012 – Din innersta fruktan (with Benny Rosenqvist) ISBN 978-9186603533
- 2018 – Från Sverige till Absurdistan ISBN 978-9188667588
