= For Britain Movement =

British far-right political party

- Leader: Anne Marie Waters
- Founder: Anne Marie Waters
- Founded: 12 October 2017
- Registered: 9 March 2018
- Dissolved: 13 July 2022
- Split from: UK Independence Party
- Merged into: British Democratic Party
- Headquarters: Fairfax House; 6A Mill Field Road; Cottingley Business Park; Bradford; BD16 1PY
- Ideology: National conservatism; Islamophobia; Right-wing populism; Hard Euroscepticism
- Political position: Far-right
- European affiliation: Identity and Democracy Party (2019–2022)

Website
- forbritain.uk

For Britain, officially the For Britain Movement, was a minor far-right political party in the United Kingdom, founded by the Islamophobic and counter-jihad activist Anne Marie Waters after she was defeated in the 2017 UK Independence Party leadership election.

== History ==
The far-right activist Anne Marie Waters left UKIP and formed For Britain after she and her supporters were described as "Nazis and racists" by Henry Bolton and UKIP's former leader Nigel Farage. The party's name was taken from her UKIP leadership campaign slogan, "Anne Marie For Britain". Waters said that the party would "speak to the forgotten people". On 9 March 2018, For Britain registered with the Electoral Commission, a requirement for any political party wishing to put up candidates in elections and to solicit donations for campaigns, as "The For Britain Movement".

The party received the support of Tommy Robinson, the former leader of the English Defence League (EDL). Its platform included reducing Muslim immigration to the UK to near zero, and trying to "bring the entire EU project down". Sean O'Driscoll, writing in The Times after Waters had announced her intention to form a party, but before it had been launched, described the proposed party as intending to fill the space left by the demise of the British National Party (BNP). In November 2017, the far-right British nationalist political party Liberty GB merged into For Britain. In April 2018, the singer and songwriter Morrissey declared his support for For Britain.

The party fielded 15 candidates in the 2018 local elections, none being elected. The party came last in almost all the seats it contested. In June 2018, the party expelled two of its local election candidates after Hope Not Hate linked one of them to the proscribed neo-Nazi group National Action and the white nationalist group Generation Identity, and showed that another had posted racist and anti-Semitic content on social media. The party briefly had one councillor, who sat on Stoke-on-Trent City Council. Richard Broughan, who was elected as a UKIP councillor in 2015, had previously been suspended from UKIP and suspended from a group of local independents before being expelled after a caution for assault. Broughan lost his seat to Labour in the 2019 local elections, coming in last place in his ward.

Some former BNP figures who were unable to join UKIP headed For Britain meetings, including former councillors and the expelled former election chief Eddy Butler. The party has been associated with a number of figures from the extreme right, including the Traditional Britain Group and Generation Identity. In September 2018, the media personality Katie Hopkins and the writer and political commentator Ingrid Carlqvist, who has been accused of Holocaust denial, spoke at For Britain's conference. The American author Robert Spencer, then banned from entering the UK, appeared via video. Before the conference, Hope Not Hate published results of an internal poll from the party, showing nearly half of For Britain's members supported a ban on immigration from Pakistan, Bangladesh and Somalia.

The party made a complaint to the Independent Press Standards Organisation (IPSO) about a newspaper column in The Northern Echo which described the party as far-right. IPSO ruled in favour of The Northern Echo, saying that many of the party's characteristics "are established conventions of both national socialism and far-right ideology". In November 2020, Julian Leppert, a For Britain councillor on Epping Forest District Council, was formally sanctioned by the council and made to attend classes on equality and diversity. He had spread false claims about local asylum seekers, and answered in the affirmative when asked by The Guardian if he wanted to set up a "whites-only enclave". In December 2020, Karen King, a councillor for the party in Hartlepool, described coverage of the COVID-19 pandemic as "scaremongering".

On 13 July 2022, the party chair, Anne Marie Waters, announced on the party's website that the party was ceasing operations immediately. Two councillors who were elected standing for the For Britain Movement then joined the far-right British Democratic Party.

== Electoral performance ==
=== Parliamentary elections ===
Waters contested the 2018 Lewisham East by-election, receiving 266 votes (1.2% of the total) and losing her deposit. In April 2019, the For Britain candidate, Hugh Nicklin, came last in the Newport West by-election with 159 votes, a 0.7% share. Waters contested the 2021 Batley and Spen by-election coming 12th of 16 candidates. The party nominated Frankie Rufolo for the 2022 Tiverton and Honiton by-election.

Date of election	Constituency	Candidate	Votes	%
14 June 2018	Lewisham East	Anne Marie Waters	266	1.2
4 April 2019	Newport West	Hugh Nicklin	159	0.7
1 July 2021	Batley and Spen	Anne Marie Waters	97	0.26
23 June 2022	Tiverton and Honiton	Frankie Rufolo	146	0.3

=== Local elections ===
In the 2019 local elections, For Britain lost its only incumbent councillor, Richard Broughan (elected as UKIP to Stoke City Council) who had defected to the party. The party won two seats, one in De Bruce ward on Hartlepool Borough Council, and one in Waltham Abbey Paternoster on Epping Forest District Council.

In the 2021 local elections, For Britain nominated 60 council candidates, of which the advocacy group Hope Not Hate identified ten as former members of the BNP. The party had no successes, with 25 of the 47 candidates whose election results were published first receiving under 50 votes each. The party's councillor for De Bruce ward in Hartlepool lost her seat, serving only two years due to changes in council boundaries. Waters also unsuccessfully stood for election for the party in De Bruce ward.

In the 2022 local elections, the party targeted 14 seats, including the home ward of Waters, De Bruce in Hartlepool. No candidates were elected, with Waters receiving 203 votes, and the two candidates in Epping Forest District Council receiving 11 and 16 votes.
