= Winchester Guildhall =

Municipal building in Winchester, Hampshire, England

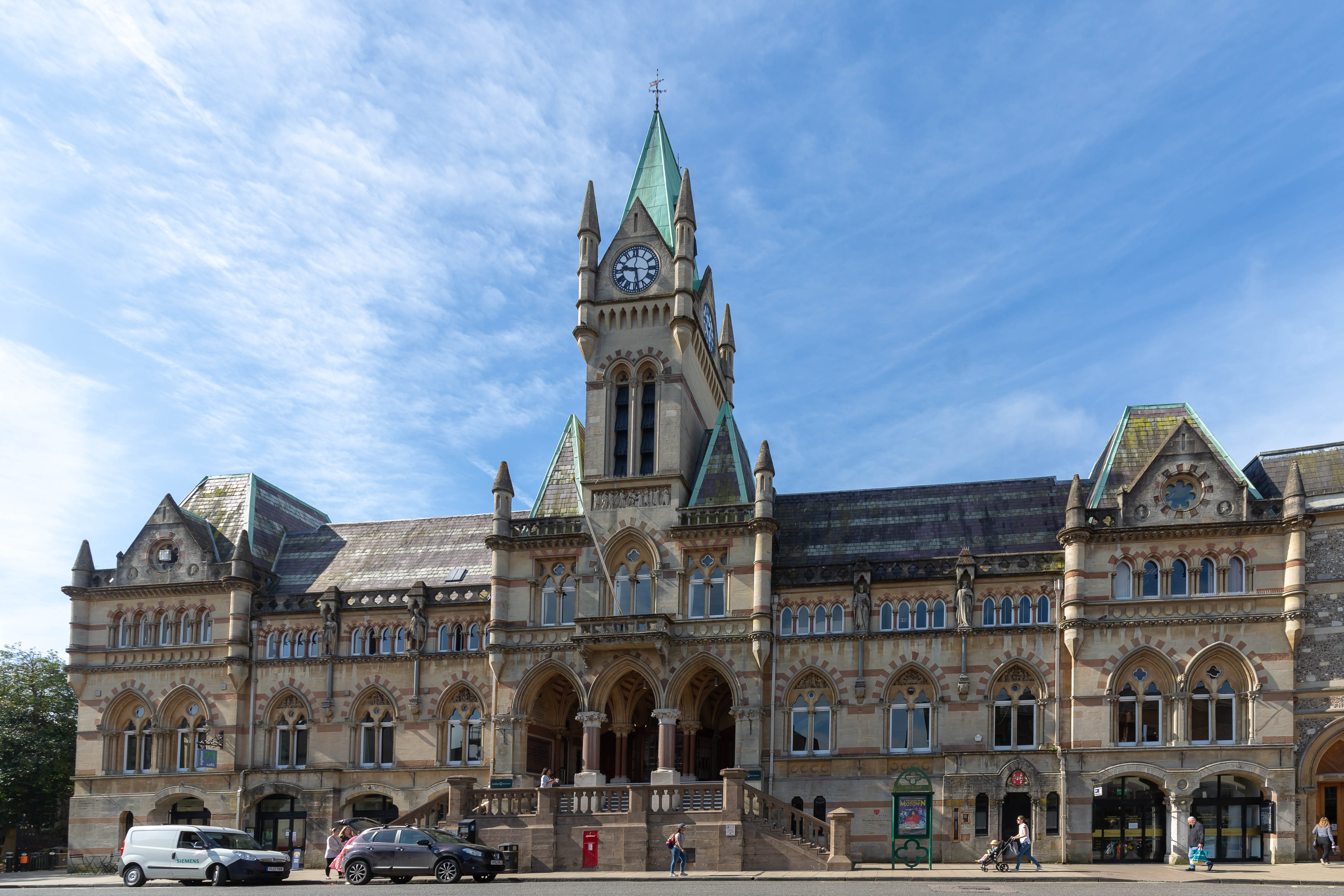
- The main front of Winchester Guildhall

- Location within Hampshire
- 51.0614°N 1.3124°W
- Location: Winchester, Hampshire

History
- Built: 1875

Site notes
- Architect(s): Jeffery and Skiller
- Architectural style: Gothic Revival style

Listed Building – Grade II
- Designated: 14 January 1974
- Reference no.: 1095464

Winchester Guildhall is a municipal building in the High Street, Winchester, Hampshire. It is a Grade II listed building.

== History ==
Prior to the opening of the current Guildhall in 1873, the Guildhall had, since the time of King Edward IV, stood on a site further up the High Street.

=== The old Guildhall ===
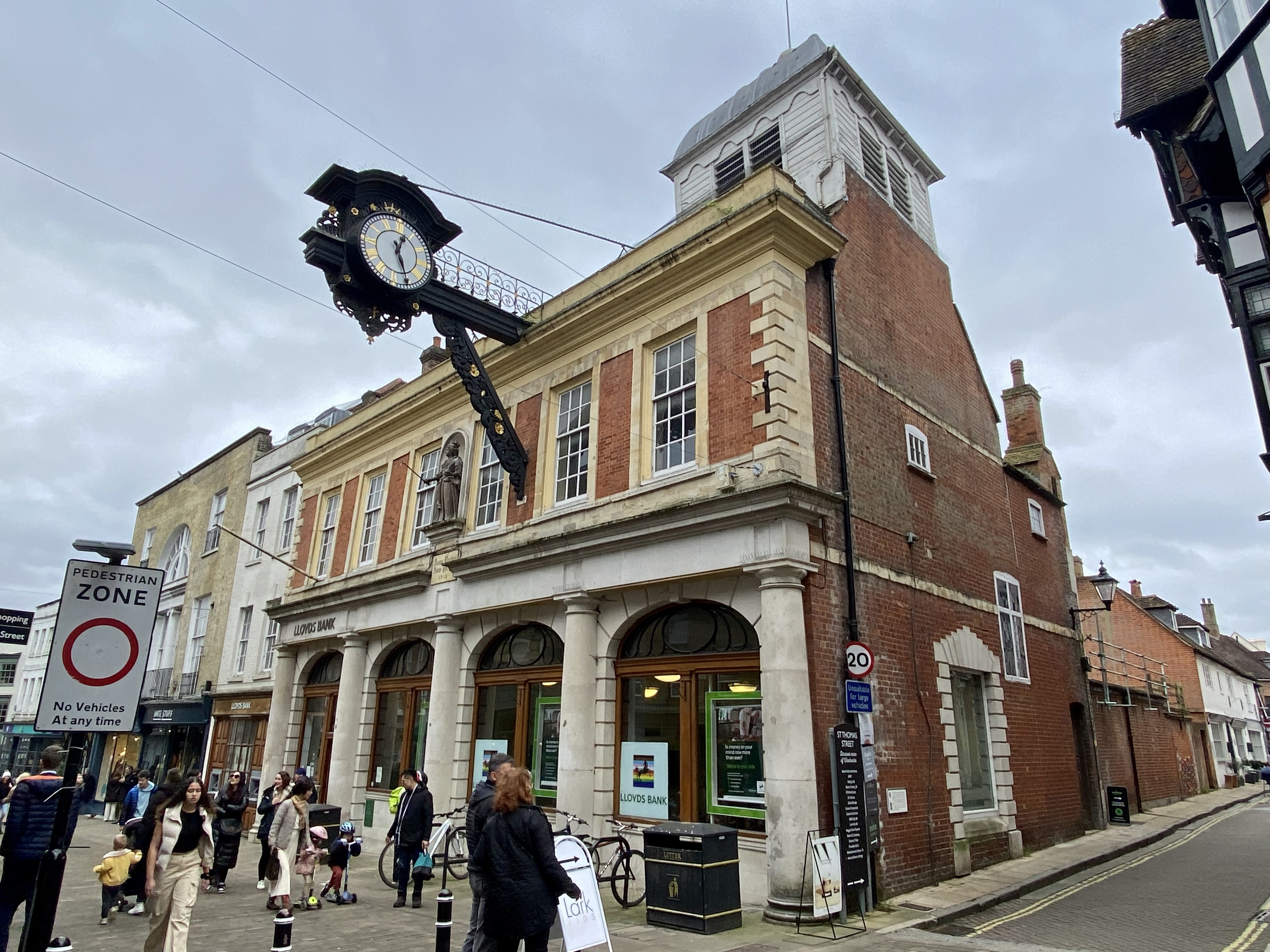
The old Guildhall building on the corner of St Thomas Street.

The medieval guildhall was reported in 1693 to be ruinous; eventually the decision was taken to demolish it and a new guildhall was built on the same site in 1713. The hall itself was on the first floor. The lower floor for a time contained shops belonging to St John's Hospital. A statue of Queen Anne was installed in a niche at first-floor level, together with a Latin inscription: Anna Regina Anno Pacifico 1713 ('Queen Anne in the Year of Peace, 1713'); it was the gift of George Bridges M.P.. At the same time a prominent clock was installed, the gift of Sir William Paulet, projecting from the parapet so as to be seen along the street in either direction. A rooftop belfry contained a curfew bell, which was rung daily at 4am and 8pm; an inscription on the bell states that it was cast by Clemant Tosiear in the year 1702.

After the opening of the new Guildhall the old building was sold; it housed a drapery business for a time, before becoming a branch of Lloyds Bank (who built a modern frontage on the ground floor). The building, which is Grade II*-listed, still stands and the curfew bell still sounds at 8pm each evening.

=== The new Guildhall ===
The site of the new Guildhall was previously occupied by St Mary's Abbey and came under crown control on the dissolution of the monasteries in the late 1530s: it was then gifted by Queen Mary to the City of Salisbury in gratitude for the city's support in securing her marriage to King Philip of Spain in 1554.

The foundation stone was laid by the former Speaker of the House of Commons, Viscount Eversley on 22 December 1871. The new building was designed by Jeffery and Skiller in the Gothic Revival style and built by Joseph Bull & Sons. The design for the central section involved a flight of steps leading up to an arcaded entrance on the first floor, three mullion windows on the second floor with a tall clock tower above flanked by angle pavilions; the tower contained a quarter-chiming clock by Gillett & Bland. Statues of local historical figures were erected on the front of the building at second floor level. It was officially opened by the Lord Chancellor, Earl of Selborne, on 18 May 1873.

An extension to the west of the original building, built to the designs of John Colson with a flint-work frontage, thereby creating a new banqueting facility, was added in 1893. The banqueting facility was subsequently renamed the King Charles Room. The guildhall, which was the meeting place of the municipal borough of Winchester continued to serve as the local seat of government after the enlarged City of Winchester was formed in 1974.

In June 2009, a large room in the guildhall was extensively refurbished with financial support from a legacy left by the Marchioness of Winchester; the money had been left on condition that it would be used to build a public hall in her honour, complete with a full-length portrait of her. In accordance with her wishes, the room was renamed the Bapsy Room in her honour and a huge portrait of her in her state robes by Frank Salisbury was given pride of place in the room.

When a portrait of King Charles I, hanging in the King Charles Room, was restored in 2017, it was revealed that the portrait was originally a depiction of Henry Jermyn, 1st Earl of St Albans by Peter Lely which had been over-painted by another painter with an image of the King. Other paintings in the King Charles Room include a portrait of King Charles II, also by Peter Lely, and a portrait of Queen Elizabeth II by Edward Halliday. In the stairwell there is a painting of the children of Charles Paulet, 13th Marquess of Winchester by Thomas Stewardson.
