= Kent Police and Crime Commissioner =

Elected law official in Kent, England

- Incumbent; Matthew Scott since 12 May 2016
- Police and crime commissioner of Kent Police
- Reports to: Kent Police and Crime Panel
- Appointer: Electorate of Kent and Medway
- Term length: Four years
- Constituting instrument: Police Reform and Social Responsibility Act 2011
- Precursor: Kent Police Authority
- Inaugural holder: Ann Barnes
- Formation: 22 November 2012
- Deputy: None currently appointed
- Salary: £88,600
- Website: www.kent-pcc.gov.uk

The Kent Police and Crime Commissioner is an elected official tasked with setting out the way crime is tackled by Kent Police in the English County of Kent. The post was created following an election held on 15 November 2012, and replaced the Kent Police Authority. The current incumbent is Matthew Scott, who represents the Conservative Party. The Office of the Kent Police and Crime Commissioner currently has 25 employees. In 2014, under inaugural Commissioner Ann Barnes, the Office was featured in a Channel 4 documentary, in which Barnes is said to have brought Kent Police into disrepute due to her perceived incompetence.

== List of Kent Police and Crime Commissioners ==
Name	Political party	Dates in office
Ann Barnes	Independent	22 November 2012 to 11 May 2016
Matthew Scott	Conservative Party	12 May 2016 to present
