= Now You See It (British game show) =

- Created by: Frank Wayne
- Presented by: Johnny Beattie (1981–4); Jack McLaughlin (1985–6); Grant Stott (1993); Fred MacAulay (1994–95)
- Narrated by: Steve Hamilton
- Country of origin: Scotland
- Original language: English

Production
- Running time: 30mins (inc. adverts)
- Production company: Goodson-Todman Productions

Original release
- Network: Scottish Television
- Release: 5 January 1981 – August 1995

Related
- Now You See It (U.S. version)

Now You See It is a television game show that aired mostly in Scotland throughout its run. It was shown to a lesser degree across some of the ITV Network. It was based upon the U.S. version of the show and used the US show's "halftime cue" as its theme music.

== Format ==
The game was centred on four contestants competing in a word search game mixed with trivia. The host asked questions and contestants buzzed in and searched for the answer on the board. Contestants had to find the line where the correct answer appeared and then the position as well as the answer. Points were awarded for correct answers, based on the line number added or multiplied by the position number. Example: Line 3 + Position 7 = 10 points or Line 3 x Position 7 = 21 points.

When time was up, the three highest-scoring players entered the "Cryptic" round. In this round, the answers appeared one letter at a time and the contestants were given a clue to each word. The first two players with four correct answers advanced to round three, which had the same format as the first round except that points doubled after a player reached 50 points or more. Later, the points doubled for every other question.

By 1985, the winner won £500 and played a solo round in which all of the correct answers fit a given category. The player must correctly answer seven out of twelve questions in order to win a mystery star prize. The solo round was also played on the children's versions in the 1990s.

In 1993 the game was played on the children's series Wemyss Bay 902101. Each game pitted a team of two stars of one programme against a team of two stars from another programme. The cryptic round was played first, except that each correct answer scored two points. The second round was played exactly like the Solo Rounds from 1985–86, except that each team took one turn circling answers for 60 seconds and each correct answer scored 5 points. The third round played exactly like the first and third round of the STV series.

The 1993 children's series was played exactly like the celebrity series, with each team representing their own school. The four highest scoring teams of the series went through to the semi-finals and the series winners won a grand prize package and the runners-up in the final won a lesser prize package.

On the 1994-1995 series, each game consisted of the cryptic round, in which each answer scored two points, and two Big Boards with the second Big Board being played for one minute and the point values being doubled during the last 30 seconds. One game pitted two boys and the other game pitted two girls. The two winners competed in the final game and the winner faced the Super Prize Board. The winner chose one of two star prizes and must find the answers to seven out of ten questions in 60 seconds.

== Prizes ==
For first two series, the winner's prize was £100. In series 3, the prizes were increased to £400 for the winner and £100 for the runner up. By 1985, the winner won £500, the first runner-up won £100, and the player eliminated in the second round £50. All contestants were give an engraved crystal decanter and four glasses. For the celebrity and children's versions, prizes were awarded instead of money.

== Transmissions ==
Series 1 was only broadcast on Scottish Television but the following series was broadcast on the ITV on Wednesday afternoons from 1 July until 26 August, with Scottish Television screening it on Thursday evenings at 19.00. The following seven series, 3 to 10, were only broadcast on Scottish Television and continued to be very popular, with two celebrity versions produced in 1985 and 1986.

The ITV network picked up the series again in 1985 with Series 11 and 13 being broadcast either at Sunday teatime, or on Friday afternoons at 17.15. (Series 12 was only broadcast in the Scottish Television region.) Scottish replaced Now You See It with Split Second in 1987 and Wheel of Fortune in 1988 with the later being Scottish Television's prime time game show for the ITV network, which lasted for a much longer run at a national level.

Now You See It returned as a children's series initially lasting up to around 10 minutes which was aired as part of Wemyss Bay 902101 on Sunday mornings in 1993, Occasional celebrity specials were also produced throughout the run. The first children's and celebrity series was presented by Grant Stott until the programme was moved to a weekday morning slot in the school summer holidays for the second and third series in 1994 and 1995 which had a new theme tune, new studio and was presented by Fred MacAulay, the timeslot was also extended to 30 minutes. The children's and celebrity series were repeated overnight on Scottish Television in 1997.

=== Original series ===
Series	Start date	End date	Episodes
1	5 January 1981	30 March 1981	13
2	2 July 1981	24 September 1981	13
3	4 January 1982	1 April 1982	12
4	16 September 1982	30 December 1982	16
5	17 May 1983	9 August 1983	13
6	27 September 1983	29 December 1983	14
7	12 January 1984	19 April 1984	14
8	3 May 1984	19 July 1984	12
9	26 July 1984	11 October 1984	12
10	2 January 1985	12 April 1985	15
11	28 April 1985	21 July 1985	13
12	1 January 1986	21 March 1986	10
13	13 April 1986	27 July 1986	13

=== Celebrity series ===
Series	Start date	End date	Episodes
1	1993	1993	??

=== Kids series ===
Series	Start date	End date	Episodes
1	11 July 1994	August 1995	??
