= Richard Norton (actor, born 1970) =

Australian actor (born 1970)

- Born: 17 December 1970 (age 55); Brighton, South Australia, Australia
- Other name: Richard W. Norton
- Occupations: Actor, theatre production manager
- Years active: 1990–present

Richard Norton (born 17 December 1970) is an Australian actor of stage and screen. After appearing in amateur stage productions and commercials, Norton auditioned for a role in the soap opera Neighbours and was cast as Ryan McLachlan when he was 19. Norton was given a one-year contract and he made his debut in early 1990. However, after less than a year in the role, Norton was written out of the serial. After his final Neighbours scenes aired in March 1991, Norton filmed a role in the Seven Network miniseries Good Vibrations. He also joined the cast of fellow soap opera Home and Away as 16 year old Simon Fitzgerald, becoming one of only a few actors to appear in both soaps. After his two-year contract with Home and Away was cut short by a year, Norton left Australia for the UK and he was hired as a presenter on the children's television show Parallel 9 in April 1993. He took on the recurring role of Shane Cochran in the British soap opera Brookside for a few episodes across 1995 and 1996.

Norton has appeared in various UK pantomime, touring, repertory and fringe theatre productions, starting with Jack and the Beanstalk in December 1991. He has played leading roles in Snow White and the Seven Dwarfs and Dick Whittington. In 1994, he appeared in his first musical 99 Heyworth Street at the Liverpool Playhouse, and played the streetwise Treat in a production of Lyle Kessler's Orphans. In February 1996, Norton appeared in the European premiere production of Dead White Males at Nuffield Theatre. He was also part of the 1997 touring production of the comedy play The Surprise Party and starred in Welsh play Killing Kangaroos along with his former Neighbours co-star Lucinda Cowden. Norton continued working in the theatre, as a technician and events manager, before becoming a production manager for the Welsh National Opera.

== Early life ==
Norton was born on 17 December 1970 in Brighton, South Australia. He is the youngest of four siblings. When Norton was six months old, his older brother was killed during a head-on collision while driving intoxicated. His mother and sister ran amateur dramatics company St Jude's Players, and Norton appeared in various stage productions, including a performance of All About Eve when he was an infant. When he was 11 years old, Norton was accidentally shot in the chest by a friend using an air rifle. The pellet went through his lung and lodged in a muscle near his heart. Doctors decided it was safer to leave it rather than attempt open-heart surgery to remove it. After spending some time in intensive care, he had to spend a further six weeks resting in case the pellet was dislodged. Norton was once head of a church choir who performed at the Adelaide Music Festival. He became interested in acting while at school. Initially, it was something he did for fun, and he did not consider it a profession until he discovered how much money he could make from appearing in television commercials. He joined the same talent agency as Natalie Imbruglia, and attended a two year course at the Ann Peters School of Acting.

== Career ==
=== 1990–1993 ===
In 1989, aged 19, Norton was cast as Ryan McLachlan in the soap opera Neighbours. The role marked his first "proper" acting job, following parts in school productions, radio voice-over work, and a commercial about the dangers of drink-driving. Norton auditioned for the role just as he was starting a hotel traineeship. He was cast along with Jeremy Angerson (Josh Anderson), whom he met at the auditions. Both actors were hired as replacements for the departing Craig McLachlan, who played Henry Ramsay. Norton reckoned he was chosen for his looks first, stating: "They do go for the looks. There's got to be some talent there, too, but I think you've just got to be natural." He was given a one-year contract, and had to leave his home for filming. Norton's character was billed as "a natural, athletic type" similar to Craig McLachlan's. He was given instant connections to the teen characters when he joins Erinsborough High. Ryan also embarked on a romance with an older woman, played by Kirstie Grant. Norton called his character "awkward in this situation", but found it easy to work with Grant on the storyline.

In December 1990, less than a year in the role, Norton's contract was not renewed and he was written out of the serial. He admitted that he was "counting on the next six months to be working", but accepted that was how things went in the acting industry. He felt that he had learnt a lot from his first television experience, but wished he had decided on how to play his character from the start. Norton admitted that he had been scared and it was months before producers worked out what he could do. He added that he would have liked more communication from writers and directors about his character. Norton's final scenes in Neighbours were broadcast in March 1991. A month later, it was announced that he would coming to the UK to play Simple Simon in a pantomime production of Jack and the Beanstalk at the Chatham Central Theatre in December.

In August 1991, David Brown of TV Week reported that Norton had joined the cast of fellow soap opera Home and Away. Brown reported that his casting came at a time when Neighbours and Home and Away were battling to poach actors from one another, which began after the latter signed Craig McLachlan. Norton became one of only a few actors to appear in both soaps. He was given a two-year contract to play 16 year old Simon Fitzgerald. He was 20 years old at the time of his casting. Simon joined the show's teens Sophie Simpson (Rebekah Elmaloglou) and Blake Dean (Les Hill) in Year 11 at Summer Bay High. He was described as charming, particularly with the girls, "sharp and witty", and able to pull off pranks without getting caught. That same year, Norton filmed a role in the Seven Network miniseries Good Vibrations.

Norton had his contract with Home and Away cut short in March 1992. Norton felt that he was working hard on the show, so it came as a shock when the producers decided it was time for Simon to leave. Norton said that the producers told him that Simon "had done his bit" and they wanted to promote new actors Matt Doran and Dieter Brummer. Norton liked the way his character was written out, with Simon leaving to reconcile with his father, but he admitted he would have stayed if the producers had asked. Norton returned to the UK to be with his girlfriend, and he attended a number of auditions for television and theatre work. He played Prince Charming in the Snow White and the Seven Dwarfs pantomime at the Alban Arena from December 1992 until January 1993. Norton was hired to present the second series of children's television show Parallel 9 in April 1993. Of his role, Norton commented "Presenting sort of found me really, Parallel 9 is such an original show that I thought it was an opportunity to do something different that was too good to miss." Norton's former Neighbours co-star Lucinda Cowden later replaced him as the Earth Base presenter.

=== 1994–present ===
After Parallel 9, Norton starred in the stage musical 99 Heyworth Street as sailor Laurie Baldwin at the Liverpool Playhouse. He was then cast as the streetwise, "rough" kid Treat in a production of Orphans at the Gatehouse Theatre in September 1994. He also appeared in the 1994–1995 pantomime production of Dick Whittington at the Barnsley Civic. In June 1995, he played the shepherd Silvius in As You Like It at Stafford Castle.

From December 1995, Norton played Australian Shane Cochran in the British soap opera Brookside. His character's backstory was similar to his own personal background as Shane is a soap opera star who comes over to the UK to appear in panto. Shane's notable storylines included a romance with Jacqui Dixon (Alex Fletcher) and a drug addiction. Norton revealed that he would not be in the show for long, stating: "It's quite interesting how the romance finishes as it has a lasting effect on Jacqui's life. But Shane doesn't get her pregnant!"

In February 1996, Norton appeared in the European premiere production of Dead White Males at Nuffield Theatre in Southampton, alongside Lucinda Cowden. He then appeared in an open-air production of Macbeth at Stafford Castle, filmed a role in the Paramount Pictures film The Saint, and played the narrator in the Beauty and the Beast panto at the Music Hall, Shrewsbury. Norton almost appeared in a fourth soap opera after auditioning for a part in Coronation Street. However, he began concentrating more on his stage career and appeared in various productions in the UK. Although he hoped to do the same in Australia, he admitted that there were better prospects in Britain.

He was part of the 1997 touring cast of comedy play The Surprise Party, along with Matthew Kelly and Ruth Madoc, before playing Buttons in the Cinderella pantomime at the Towngate Theatre, Poole. In February 1998, he guested in an episode of the ITV teen drama series Wavelength. A few months later, Norton began teaching drama to students at the Hayley Johnston School of Dance and Drama in Sevenoaks. He appeared in the title role of the pantomime Dick Whittington at the Lyceum Theatre from 12 December 1998 until 10 January 1999. In August 1999, Norton guested in an episode of the British police drama The Bill, before he reunited with Cowden in the Welsh play Killing Kangaroos which was staged at the Taliesin Arts Centre in October. In 2001, Norton played an Australian sergeant in the British television film Sword of Honour.

Norton went onto work as a theatre technician, events manager, freelance assistant production manager for the Royal Shakespeare Company and National Theatre, before taking a role as a production manager for the Welsh National Opera. He oversaw a touring production of Figaro Gets a Divorce by Elena Langer in 2016, following its premiere at the Wales Millennium Centre.

== Personal life ==
Norton married dance teacher Hayley Johnston in April 1993. They met in 1991 when they both appeared in Jack and the Beanstalk as Simple Simon and the Fairy respectively. They maintained a long distance relationship when Norton returned to Australia, before Johnston flew out to visit and convinced Norton to return to the UK.

After his first marriage ended, Norton was married to actress Shelley Miranda Barrett, whom he met during a production of Killing Kangaroos at the Sherman Theatre in 1999. They married in 2002 at Albertson's Chapel on Sunset Boulevard.

Norton and his partner welcomed a son in 2017.

== Acting credits ==
=== Television ===
Year	Title	Role	Notes
1990–1991	Neighbours	Ryan McLachlan	Main cast
1991–1992	Home and Away	Simon Fitzgerald	Main cast
1992	Good Vibrations	Sonny	Miniseries
1993	Parallel 9	Earth Base Presenter	
1995–1996	Brookside	Shane Cochran	Recurring
1998	Wavelength	Waiter	Episode: "Mixed Messages"
1999	The Bill	Steve Kellerman	Episode: "Sun Hill Boulevard"
2001	Sword of Honour	Australian sergeant	Television film

=== Theatre ===
Year	Production	Role	Location
1991–1992	Jack and the Beanstalk	Simple Simon	Chatham Central Theatre
1992–1993	Snow White and the Seven Dwarfs	Prince Charming	Alban Arena
1994	99 Heyworth Street	Laurie Baldwin	Liverpool Playhouse
1994	Orphans	Treat	Gatehouse Theatre
1994–1995	Dick Whittington	Captain	Barnsley Civic
1995	As You Like It	Silvius	Stafford Castle
1996	Dead White Males	Steve	Nuffield Theatre
1996	Macbeth	Witch	Stafford Castle
1996–1997	Beauty and the Beast	Muddles the Manservant	Music Hall
1997	The Surprise Party		Various (touring)
1997–1998	Cinderella	Buttons	Towngate Theatre
1998–1999	Dick Whittington	Dick Whittington	Lyceum Theatre
1999	Killing Kangaroos	Rod	Sherman Theatre, Newport Centre, Taliesin Arts Centre
