= Terri Seymour =

British television personality (born 1973)

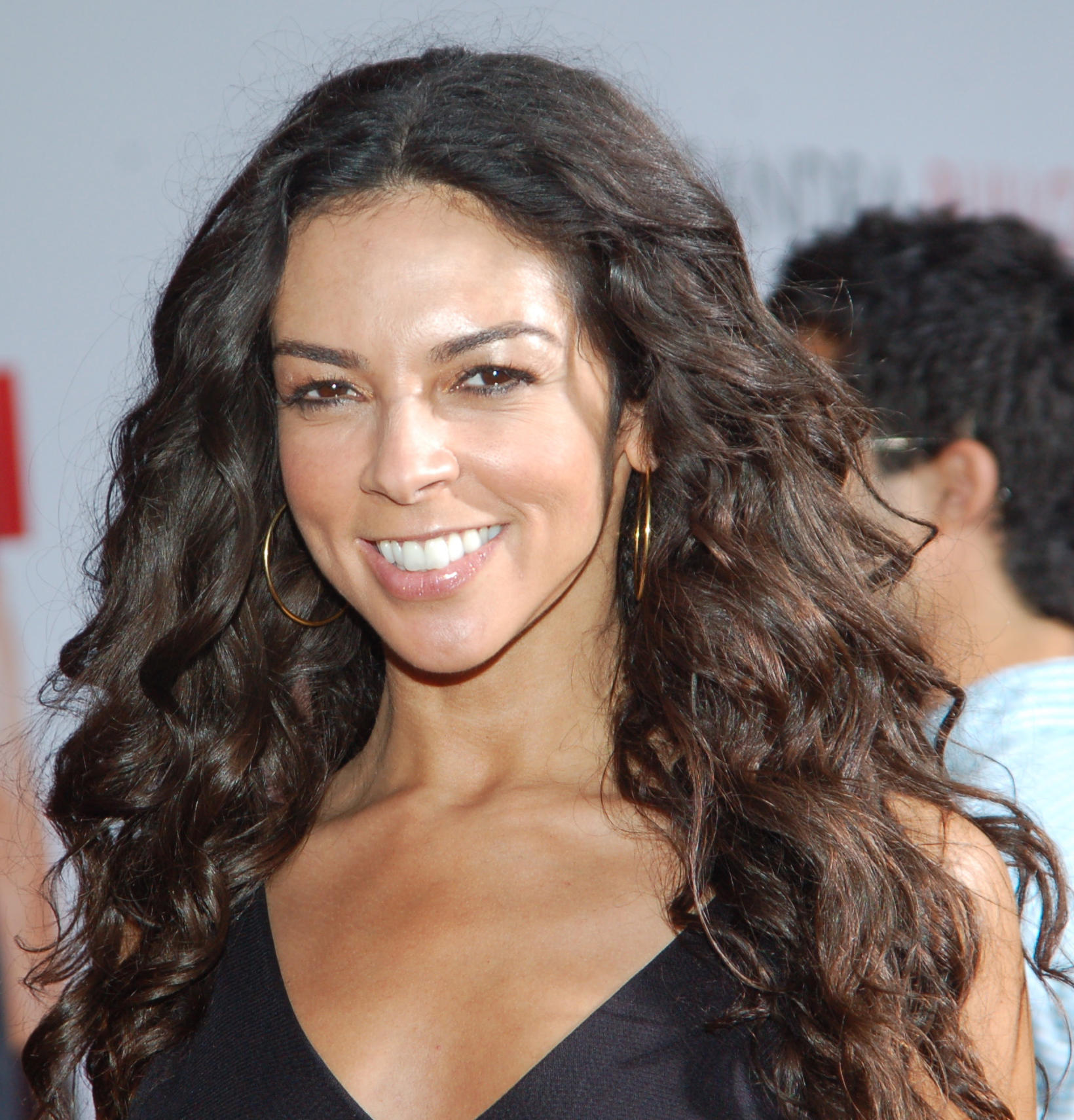
- Seymour at the premiere for The Proposal in June 2009
- Born: Terri Louise Seymour; 27 January 1973 (age 53); Little Chalfont, Buckinghamshire, England
- Occupations: Entertainment reporter, actress
- Known for: Extra, The Xtra Factor
- Children: 1

Terri Louise Seymour (born 27 January 1973) is an English entertainment reporter and actress. Seymour joined the American entertainment news show Extra as a correspondent in 2004.

== Early life ==
Seymour was born in Little Chalfont, Buckinghamshire in 1973. Her mother, Margaret, was a single mother. Although Seymour did not have a relationship with her father, she has said her father was West Indian and her mother is white. Seymour began modelling at age 12.

== Career ==
Early in her career Seymour was a commercial model. Later she appeared in music videos for George Michael and Soul II Soul. She played the role of Eve in In the Beginning (miniseries), an American biblical television miniseries from the year 2000. She also became a hostess on the ITV game show Wheel of Fortune, alongside John Leslie, then Paul Hendy. Her first episode aired 9 January 2001. After Wheel of Fortune ended later that year, Seymour moved to the United States where she continued working as a host and model.

Seymour joined the American entertainment news program Extra in 2004. She still made some appearances on British television, working as a reporter on ITV2's The Xtra Factor and This Morning. Seymour began to appear more frequently on Extra, where she started as a freelance reporter covering American Idol for the programme before joining as correspondent.

== Personal life ==
While modelling in her early twenties, Seymour experienced joint pain which was diagnosed as systemic lupus. The lupus caused peritonitis requiring surgery and medication. Seymour's lupus eventually went into remission although she did undergo additional tests and monitoring during her pregnancy in 2015.

Seymour dated Simon Cowell from 2002 to 2008. During their relationship the pair lived in London and Los Angeles, though Seymour spent more time in Los Angeles for her work. She and Cowell remained friends after their split. On 9 March 2015, Seymour and boyfriend Clark Mallon's daughter, Coco, was born.
