= Who Dares Wins (Australian game show) =

- Created by: David Mason; Adrian Brant
- Presented by: Mike Whitney; Tania Zaetta
- Country of origin: Australia
- Original language: English
- No. of seasons: 3
- No. of episodes: 107

Production
- Running time: 30 minutes (including commercials)
- Production company: Mason Brant Entertainment

Original release
- Network: Seven Network
- Release: 4 February 1996 – 15 November 1998

Who Dares Wins is an Australian adventure game show that originally aired on the Seven Network between 1996 and 1998. Hosted by former Test cricketer Mike Whitney and co-hosted by Tania Zaetta, the show has been screened in over 50 countries around the world. It was created by David Mason and Adrian Brant.

As an adventure game show in which contestants are expected to complete undesirable tasks to win prizes, Who Dares Wins could be considered a precursor to subsequent reality TV series such as Fear Factor.

== Format ==
The main focus of each episode of the show often revolves around a dangerous stunt of some kind. An unsuspecting contestant, previously nominated by a viewer of the show, is ambushed by Whitney and dared to partake and complete the stunt successfully to win a major prize (usually a holiday and spending money).

Most of the runtime of a typical episode is devoted to the preparation of the stunt and the training the contestant receives. Often the stunt would also be demonstrated beforehand (successfully or unsuccessfully) by professional stuntmen.

In the climax of the show the contestant then attempts to complete the dare; if successful, they win the major prize. If they fail or decide to drop out, co-host Zaetta will then try to complete the dare instead; the contestants forfeits the prize if she succeeds, but if she fails or pulls out herself, the contestant wins regardless.

During the show, each major dare is bookended by several minor segments in which Whitney travels the streets and shopping malls of Australia challenging people to complete a lesser dare for a cash prize (usually around A$50 to $200). This may range from sticking a hand into a container full of cockroaches or having all their hair shaved off, to more complex dares such as tightrope walking above a mall foyer, or diving off a ten-metre platform into a pool. Another dare was a challenge to eat a Nestlé Maxibon ice-cream in 30 seconds; if a contestant managed to complete the challenge, they would then be awarded A$50 and dubbed a 'Whitney Warrior'.

== Licensed merchandise ==
A board game called Who Dares Wins: The Board Game was made and released by Milton Bradley featuring the Seven Network logo and a picture of Mike Whitney on the cover of the box.

== Series overview ==
Series	Episodes	Originally released	
Series	Episodes	First released	Last released
1	42	4 February 1996	November 1996
2	40	February 1997	November 1997
3	25	31 May 1998	15 November 1998

== Awards ==
Awards and nominations for Who Dares Wins
Year	Award	Category	Nominee(s)	Result	Ref.
1997	39th Annual TV Week Logie Awards	Most Popular New Talent	Tania Zaetta	Nominated	

== International broadcasts and adaptations ==
Despite Australian production of the show ending in 1998, Who Dares Wins continued to be popular around the globe on cable television networks such as AXN. In particular, the show's massive success in India led to a series of India-based specials hosted by Whitney and Zaetta in 2002, and later an Indian spin-off called Extreme Dhamaka in 2003.

The show was also licensed to the United Kingdom and began in 1998 as Don't Try This at Home and was followed by its spin-off Challenge of a Lifetime in 2001. In the United States the Game Show Network aired Who Dares Wins on several occasions, with the tagline that Who Dares Wins was "Australian for Game Show" as a parody of Foster's Lager's American advertising campaign of the time.

== See also ==
- List of Australian television series
