= Don't Try This at Home (TV series) =

- Genre: Game show
- Based on: Who Dares Wins by: David Mason; Adrian Brant
- Presented by: Davina McCall; Darren Day (1998)
- Starring: Paul Hendy; Kate Thornton; Tristan Bancks
- Voices of: Russ Williams
- Country of origin: United Kingdom
- Original language: English
- No. of series: 4
- No. of episodes: 46 (inc. 3 specials)

Production
- Running time: 60 minutes (inc. adverts)
- Production companies: LWT and Golden Square Pictures

Original release
- Network: ITV
- Release: 16 May 1998 – 5 May 2001

Don't Try This at Home! is a British game show produced by LWT with Golden Square Pictures and broadcast on ITV between 16 May 1998 and 5 May 2001. Based on the Australian adventure game show Who Dares Wins, it took up the Saturday challenge game show slot left by its long-running and more sedate predecessor You Bet!.

It featured real people facing tough challenges such as swinging under a bridge. It was hosted by Davina McCall with co-hosts including Darren Day and Tristan Bancks (both only in the first series), Kate Thornton and Paul Hendy. Russ Williams was the event commentator. A lifetime medal was awarded for winning a challenge or having a very good try. The show regularly featured stunts and performers from The Circus of Horrors.

A spin-off show was produced in 2001 called Challenge of a Lifetime and was hosted by Claire Sweeney.

== Challenges ==
=== The Saturday Challenge ===
A member of the audience either picked randomly or planted was picked to do something a bit scary. Before the end of the show they went to the secret location with co-host Kate Thornton and performed the challenge. Challenges included driving under a truck moving at 30 mph, standing on a podium and landing on your feet after a car knocked the stand over.

=== The Don't Try This at Home! World News ===
Footage of people doing outrageous things from around the world.

=== Paul Hendy's Shoppers' Challenge ===
Paul Hendy was challenged to persuade a certain number of shoppers to do something. Fight their way out of a giant paper bag or finding a £5 note in three boxes of yukky stuff. If he did not get the requisite number of shoppers to do it then he had to do the challenge himself in the studio the next week

=== Face Your Phobia ===
A member of the audience is invited onto the floor as Paul Hendy asks them about their fear of (e.g. Snakes). They then enter the booth and stay in there for 30 seconds.

=== The Super Challenge ===
A challenge that took several weeks to complete and was very difficult. These included climbing to the top of Mount Kilimanjaro in Africa or canoeing the Amazon.

=== The Challenge of a Lifetime ===
The main feature of the show, where a person would participate in a stunt after being nominated or writing in to the programme themselves. Davina then turned up unannounced and asked them to pick one of three envelopes, each with a different challenge inside given by a cryptic clue. They then travelled to the place of the challenge which could have been on the other side of the world. These challenges asked of you more than you wanted them to and such challenges included hand-feeding sharks in Australia, jumping down a 100m gorge in New Zealand on a wire descender, abseiling the tallest building in the Southern Hemisphere, driving a car across a huge drop on nothing but two slack wires and so on. The person could back out if they wanted which from the second series onwards, meant that the host herself was allowed to try the challenge. If the host failed, an expert would perform the challenge.

The only challenge Davina succeeded at was doing a bungee jump over the Grand Canyon.

== Transmissions ==
=== Series ===
Series	Start date	End date	Episodes
1	16 May 1998	4 July 1998	8
2	23 January 1999	27 February 1999	16
2	11 September 1999	4 December 1999	16
3	8 January 2000	19 February 2000	12
3	24 June 2000	29 July 2000	12
4	17 February 2001	5 May 2001	10

=== Specials ===
Date	Entitle
6 March 1999	Compilation (Part 1)
13 March 1999	Compilation (Part 2)
26 February 2000	Compilation
