= Parallel 9 =

British children's TV series (1992–1994)

- Genre: Children's
- Presented by: Roddy Maude-Roxby (1992); Helen Atkins (1992); Jenny Bolt (1992); Dominic McHale (1992); Kevin Williams (1992); Stephen Hope-Wynne (1992); Jo Manning-Wilson (1992); Richard Norton (1993); Lucinda Cowden (1993–94); Paul Hendy (1994); Richard Waites (1994)
- Country of origin: United Kingdom
- Original language: English
- No. of series: 3
- No. of episodes: 64

Production
- Production location: Pinewood Studios
- Running time: 120 minutes
- Production companies: Roach & Partners

Original release
- Network: BBC1
- Release: 25 April 1992 – 17 September 1994

Parallel 9 is a British children's television series that aired on BBC1 from 25 April 1992 to 17 September 1994. Airing on Saturday mornings, Parallel 9 was the first BBC Saturday morning children's series to be produced by an independent production company – in this case Roach & Partners – rather than the BBC's in-house children's production unit.

The show was filmed at Pinewood Studios and is notable for the large number of changes in cast and situation that it undertook during its run, despite retaining the same branding throughout.

== History ==
=== Series 1 ===
The show focused on Mercator, an old alien 'Time Baron' with very long eyebrows (played by Roddy Maude-Roxby) who had been banished to Parallel 9 after summoning an earth girl named Calendular as a result of his thirst for knowledge – a criminal offence on his home planet 'Zarb'.

As part of his punishment, he was allowed to awake for only 2 hours a week; from 9am to 11am on 'the day the Earthlings call Saturday', and had the ability to 'beam up' guests from Earth to Parallel 9, to take part in interviews and features with Calendular, who had decided to take up permanent residence in Parallel 9.

Among the other characters that made regular appearances in the first series were three other criminals who had been banished from their home planet: Steyl, Skyn and Thynkso. The latter three spent their time plotting ways to escape Parallel 9.

Celebrity guests included Kylie Minogue, Dannii Minogue, Right Said Fred, Shakespeare's Sister, Frank Bruno, Jason Donovan and Sylvia Anderson.

=== Series 2 ===
The new series was more vibrant than its predecessor, with jauntier opening titles, a brighter set and a new lead character; though this character retained the name Mercator, the character changed to a younger, more manic man with spiky hair, played by Christopher Wild. New characters including Zee, Dr. Kovan and Brian the Dinosaur, a puppet created by David Claridge (creator of Roland Rat) were introduced, replacing the supporting characters from the previous run.

The only connections between this series and the previous run were the name P9, that of Mercator, and the Tope, the clear cubicle which formed a central part of the programme's set, played by Stephen Hope Wynne (who played numerous other characters in all the seasons), and which in this series switched from being a dimensional prison to become the space station's power source.

During this series, a 'base station' (static caravan) was used to provide a 'link' by which guests could be 'transported' from Earth to P9: the Earth-based presenter was initially Richard Norton, before Lucinda Cowden took over. The presenter's role was to introduce items and guests from the "Earth base", and send guests through a curtain in the caravan for "transportation" to the P9 station.

=== Series 3 ===
Mercator was recast again, and was this time a buttoned-down commander type, played by Richard Waites of ITV's ZZZap! and No. 73; Zee also left, and was replaced by Flynn, played by Kate Lonergan (formerly of Maid Marian and Her Merry Men). Dr. Kovan and Brian remained and were joined by a younger second dinosaur named Derek also operated by Claridge, and the setting continued to be a space station; the 'base station on Earth' concept also continued, with Paul Hendy joining to present with Lucinda Cowden.

== Transmissions ==
Series	Start date	End date	Episodes
1	25 April 1992	19 September 1992	20
2	24 April 1993	18 September 1993	22
3	23 April 1994	17 September 1994	22
