= Paul Hendy =

Script-writer, novelist, director, producer and filmmaker

- Born: 22 July 1966 (age 60); Dawley, Shropshire, England
- Occupations: Script-writer; novelist; director; producer; filmmaker; former broadcaster
- Years active: 1990–present
- Television: The Disney Club (1989–1994); Parallel 9 (1994); Don’t Try This at Home (1998–2001); Wheel of Fortune (2001)

Paul Clifford Hendy (born 22 July 1966) is a British script-writer, novelist, director, producer and filmmaker. In his early career, he was a TV presenter hosting the BAFTA nominated Dear Mr Barker (BBC), Don’t Try This at Home (ITV), The Disney Club (ITV), and Wheel of Fortune (ITV). He was a regular reporter on ITV’s This Morning and hosted Stash the Cash.

Paul wrote, directed and co-produced the West End play, The Last Laugh.

== Early career ==
Hendy was born in Dawley on 22 July 1966. Hendy's career started as a member of The National Youth Theatre of Great Britain, playing the part of Billy Casper in Kes in 1980. His first break into television came when he hosted ITV's Sunday morning flagship show The Disney Club. After leaving The Disney Club, Hendy went to the BBC and hosted the Saturday morning show Parallel 9 which was broadcast live from Pinewood Studios. He has also presented Disney Summer Holidays (ITV), For Amusement Only (BBC), Highly Sprung (BBC), Travel Bug (an Action Time Production for BBC) and three series of the BAFTA-nominated Dear Mr Barker (BBC).

In 2001, he took over from John Leslie as host of ITV1's game show Wheel of Fortune with Terri Seymour and ITV1's prime time Saturday night show Don't Try This at Home with Davina McCall, which ran for four series (1998–2001). He hosted the un-aired pilot of the UK version of the game show The Chair (BBC1), which was eventually hosted by No. 1 tennis player John McEnroe in 2002.

Hendy was a regular reporter for ITV's This Morning and a guest presenter on GMTV. He hosted Talking TV (BBC1), Walk Over History (Meridian) and The Dog Listener (Channel 5). He has also hosted Kicked Into Touch (Meridian) and Stash (ITV). He also hosted a cinema review show called The Box Office Boys (BFBS), and featured on an episode of Surprising Stars with Kate Thornton.

== Film ==
In 2016, Hendy wrote, directed and produced the short film, The Last Laugh. The film won Best UK Film and Best UK Short at the Manchester Film Festival as well as many other International film awards including Best Comedy Drama at Los Angeles Independent Film Festival and Best Supporting Actor at Sydney Independent Film Festival.

In 2018, Hendy and his production company Evolution, optioned the film rights to Tim Whitnall’s Olivier award-winning play, Morecambe. Hendy subsequently directed and produced a short film about Eric Morecambe entitled Mr Sunshine.

In 2023, Hendy directed and produced the short film, The Choice. The film was written by Tim Whitnall, starring Rita Simons and Alexander Macqueen. The film has won seven awards, including: "Best Horror" at Ignite Film Festival; "Best Director" at Los Angeles Independent Film Festival Awards; "Award of Excellence: Film Short" and "Award of Excellence: Leading Actress" at Accolade Global Film Competition; "Best of Show", "Best Direction", and "Best Leading Man" at Best Shorts Festival. It also received an honourable mention at Brighton Rocks International Film Festival.

== The Last Laugh (Stage Play) ==
In 2024, Hendy adapted his short film, The Last Laugh, into a stage play. Like the original film, the production imagines a meeting between three legendary British comedians—Tommy Cooper, Eric Morecambe, and Bob Monkhouse—as they share a dressing room, reflecting on their careers, personal lives, and what it means to be funny.

The play premiered at the Edinburgh Festival Fringe in August 2024, where it received critical acclaim. Following its success, it transferred to London’s Noël Coward Theatre in the West End in February 2025, with the original Edinburgh cast reprising their roles: Bob Golding as Eric Morecambe, Damian Williams as Tommy Cooper, and Simon Cartwright as Bob Monkhouse.

After its London run, The Last Laugh transferred to New York City in April 2025, opening at 59E59 Theaters. A UK tour followed from June to August 2025, with performances in cities including York, Richmond, Newcastle, Sheffield, Milton Keynes, Glasgow, Birmingham, Manchester, Guildford, Cardiff, and Southend. The play is set to tour again in 2026.

The production received widespread critical praise, with reviewers highlighting its nostalgic tribute to British comedy and The Daily Mail calling it "Comedy Heaven". Metro gave it 5 stars and callted it "genius." Broadway World called it "incomparable pleasure". Theatre SouthEast gave it five stars and said "You'll struggle to see anything better this year... Outstanding...". WhatsOnStage commended the "trio of sublime performances", and The Sunday Times referred to it as "lovingly written and directed", and The Sunday Express praised it as "a blissful blast of nostalgia and belly laughs". Critics widely noted its ability to balance humour with a poignant reflection on the lives of its subjects, resonating strongly with audiences.

Hendy is currently adapting the script into a feature film.

== Novels ==
In 2004, Hendy wrote the novel Diary of a C-List Celeb, a fictionalised account of his experiences in television and the entertainment industry. The novel was published by Bantam (Penguin Random House).

Davina McCall called the book "bloody genius, very funny and leg-crossingly embarrassing!" and Declan Donnelly of Ant and Dec called it "Very funny ... and spookily close to the truth".

In 2006, Hendy wrote the sequel, Who Killed Simon Peters? also published by Bantam (Penguin Random House).

== Radio ==
On radio, Hendy has hosted his own late night phone-in show, three times a week on LBC (1996). He has also presented a series of one-off specials for BFBS in which he interviewed celebrities about their all-time favourite top ten records (2001).

== Evolution Productions ==

In 2005, Hendy set up Evolution Productions with his wife, Emily Wood. It produces film and theatre in the UK and abroad.

Evolution's 2017/18 production of Peter Pan at The Marlowe Theatre in Canterbury was attended by over 100,000 theatre goers, a record for the venue. The British Theatre Guide called the show "one of the best productions in the country".

Each year, Evolution produces 10 pantomimes around the UK with performers including: Stephen Mulhern, Duncan James, Shirley Ballas, Steve McFadden, Ade Edmonson, Carrie Hope Fletcher, Ore Oduba, John Thomson, Rita Simons and George Takei.

Evolution have won Pantomime of the Year at the UK Pantomime Awards in 2017, 2018, 2020, 2021 and 2024. Hendy won and Best Director in 2021 and Best Script in 2023

During the 2025 Edinburgh Fringe Festival, Evolution Productions produced a play, The Last Laugh, written and directed by Hendy and based on his 2016 film of the same name. The plot imagines a meeting between British comedians Tommy Cooper, Eric Morecambe and Bob Monkhouse. This then went on to achieve critical success in the West End, and on tour.

=== Awards ===
==== Film awards ====
Year	Award	Awarding Body	Result
2023/2024	Best Horror	Ignite Film Festival	Won
2023/2024	Best Supporting Actor	Ignite Film Festival	Nominated
2023/2024	Best Director	Los Angeles Independent Film Festival	Won
2023/2024	Award of Excellence Special Mention: Film Short	Accolade Global Film Competition	Won
2023/2024	Award of Excellence: Actress: Leading (Rita Simons)	Accolade Global Film Competition	Won
2023/2024	Best of Show	Best Shorts	Won
2023/2024	Best Direction	Best Shorts	Won
2023/2024	Best Leading Man	Best Shorts	Won
2023/2024	Honourable Mention	Brighton Rocks International Film Festival	Won
2017	Best UK Film	Manchester Film Festival	Won
2017	Best UK Short	Manchester Film Festival	Won
2017	Best Actor	St Albans Film Festival	Won
2017	Best Film	St Albans Film Festival	Won
2017	Best Short (Comedy)	International Film Festival of Word Cinema	Won
2016	Award of Excellence	The Accolade Global Film Festival	Won
2016	Best Comedy Drama	Los Angeles Independent Film Festival	Won
2016	Award of Excellence	The Best Shorts Competition	Won
2016	Best Actor	Southampton International Film Festival	Won
2016	Best Supporting Actor	Southampton International Film Festival	Won
2016	Best Actor	Discover Film Festival	Won
2016	Best Supporting Actor	Sydney Independent Film Festival	Won
2016	Best Screenplay	Sydney Independent Film Festival	Won

== Filmography ==
=== Production ===
Year	Title	Role	Notes
2023	The Choice	Producer & Director	Short
2018	Mr Sunshine	Producer & Director	Short
2017	The Last Laugh	Writer, Director & Producer	Short
2016	Help! My Teachers are Aliens!	Writer, Director & Producer	Short
2014	Ski Fall	Writer, Director & Producer	Short
2014	Home Alone (in Eastry)	Writer, Director & Producer	Short

=== Self ===
Year	Title	Role	Notes
2018	When Award Shows Go Horribly Wrong	Himself	
2015	Ant & Dec's Saturday Night Takeaway	Himself	
1998–2001	Don't Try This at Home!	Presenter	5 Series
1999	Night Fever	Himself	3 Episodes
1999	This Morning	Himself	
1996–1998	Dear Mr Barker	Presenter	3 Series
1995	Travel Bug	Host	
1994	Celebrity Squares	Himself	
1989	The Disney Club	Presenter	

=== Actor ===
Year	Title	Role	Notes
2000	Talking TV		
1995	For Amusement Only	On Screen Participant	13 Episodes
1992	Parallel 9		
1987	Out of Order	Roberts	
