= Angela Ekaette =

Nigerian ballet dancer

- Born: Angela Ekaette; Nigeria
- Occupations: Ballet dancer, television presenter
- Years active: 1980s–present
- Employer: UK television broadcasters
- Known for: Co-hosting the UK television game show Wheel of Fortune (1988)
- Notable work: Wheel of Fortune (UK); Bazaar; Equal Voice
- Television: Wheel of Fortune (UK version) – Co-host (1988); Bazaar – Television appearance
- Successor: Carol Smillie

Angela Ekaette is a Nigerian ballet dancer best known for co-hosting the UK version of Wheel of Fortune for its first series in 1988 and three celebrity specials before being replaced by Carol Smillie. Around that time, she also appeared on Bazaar, and was the consultant for the 4Learning show "Equal Voice".
