= In the Beginning (miniseries) =

- DVD cover
- Written by: John Goldsmith
- Directed by: Kevin Connor
- Starring: Martin Landau; Jacqueline Bisset; Billy Campbell; Eddie Cibrian; Diana Rigg; Amanda Donohoe
- Theme music composer: Ken Thorne
- Country of origin: United States
- Original language: English
- No. of episodes: 2

Production
- Producer: Paul Lowin
- Cinematography: Elemér Ragályi
- Editors: Bill Blunden; Barry Peters
- Running time: 189 min

Original release
- Network: NBC
- Release: November 12 – November 13, 2000

In the Beginning is a 2000 American two-part biblical television miniseries directed by Kevin Connor. It stars Martin Landau and Jacqueline Bisset and originally aired on NBC on November 12 and 13, 2000.

== Plot ==
In the Beginning is the story about the travels and travails of the tribe of Abraham (Martin Landau). Set around the year 2000 B.C., the narrative opens with "Genesis 12," wherein the L has told Abraham and company to leave their country to a land of milk and honey to be named later. In order to keep up the morale of his followers while on the road, Abraham gives a sermon that sums up God's creation of the universe. By illustrating this sermon with stock footage and special-effects shots, the producers attempt to make a connection between sermons of old and popular entertainments of today. From there, the twists and turns of the Old Testament are treated like a soap opera. Family dramas take center stage, whether it's God testing Abraham by telling him to kill his son in sacrifice, Joseph gaining power in Egypt after being sold to slave traders by his brothers, or one of the many other stories of brothers fighting (Cain and Abel, Isaac and Ishmael, etc.). Many events are visualized such as the plagues and the parting of the Red Sea.

== Cast ==
- Martin Landau as Abraham
- Jacqueline Bisset as Sarah
- Billy Campbell as Moses
- Eddie Cibrian as Joseph
- Fred Weller as Jacob
- Alan Bates as Jethro
- Steven Berkoff as Potiphar
- Geraldine Chaplin as Jochebed
- Amanda Donohoe as Zuleika
- Christopher Lee as Ramesses I
- Art Malik as Ramesses II
- Sara Carver as Hagar
- Rachael Stirling as Young Rebeccah
- Diana Rigg as Mature Rebeccah
- Victor Spinetti as Happatezoah
- David Threlfall as Aaron
- David Warner as Eliezer
- Terri Seymour as Eve
- Sendhil Ramamurthy as Adam
- Sean Pertwee as Isaac
- Andrew Grainger as Esau
- Jonathan Firth as Joshua
- Danny Webb as Laban
- Frank Finlay as God's voice (uncredited)
- Archie Panjabi as Basya
