= Good Vibrations (miniseries) =

- Written by: David Phillips; Morris Gletizman; Lynn Bayonas
- Directed by: Graham Thorburn
- Starring: Stephen Whittaker; Genevieve Picot; Felicity Soper; Alan Hopgood; William McInnes
- Country of origin: Australia
- Original language: English
- No. of episodes: 2 x 2 hours

Production
- Production company: Southern Star Group

Original release
- Network: Seven Network
- Release: 22 April – 29 April 1992

Good Vibrations is a 1992 Australian mini series about a family who discover their house is a portal to the afterlife. It was shot from 1 July to 2 August 1991.

== Cast ==
- Stephen Whittaker as Raf
- Geneviève Picot as Kate Reiner
- Felicity Soper as Sky
- Alan Hopgood as Cec
- Sasha Close as Lily
- William McInnes as David Chester
- David Hoflin as Donovan
- Jeffrey Walker as David
- Grant Dodwell as Leo Reiner
- Mandy Salomon as Judy Bruin
- Richard Norton as Sonny
- Melissa Jaffer as Annie
- Neil Melville as Jim
- Terry Gill as Fred
- Vic Gordon as Old Joe
- Mark Mitchell as W. C. Fields
