= Dead White Males (play) =

Play written by David Williamson

- Written by: David Williamson
- Original language: English

Premiere
- Date premiered: 1995

Dead White Males is a 1995 play by David Williamson. It was written in response to an academic paper on post-structuralism that Williamson found incomprehensible. The appearance of William Shakespeare features as a motif throughout the play.

== Background ==
Williamson later recalled he was inspired by listening to an academic at a writers conference on whom he based Dr Grant Swain:

[He] got up and told us in a very condescending way that we were all idiot savants, that we didn't know what we were writing, the ideological currents of the time just passed through us and we channelled this ideological content and out it came. But he sort of patted us all on the head and said, 'But keep writing, we'll tell you what you've done.' And I've never seen a room full of angrier writers, and I said, 'I've got to get this guy.' And that was the motivation for...and I still think it's one of my favourite bits of work because I do think a lot of post-modern and post-structuralist theory is frankly bullshit. It's the idea that there is no truth and that anyone's truth is as good as anyone else's truth and that we're totally constructed by words, there's no reality out there aside from words...give us a break! It's absolute crap. What I said in the play, it's a third truth elevated to a total truth, which often happens in the case of ideology. There's no doubt that ideology is created to distort reality in favour of the group or the people in the group whose power will be enhanced by adopting this ideology.

== Reception ==
The play was very successful, grossing $1.2 million it its initial season.
