= Steve Hamilton (broadcaster) =

Scottish broadcaster

- Born: Roland James Hamilton; 24 February 1950; Dumfries, Scotland
- Died: 1 August 2009 (aged 59)
- Occupation: Broadcaster
- Years active: 1975–2009
- Known for: Wheel of Fortune game show announcer
- Children: 2

Roland James Hamilton, known as Steve Hamilton (24 February 1950 – 1 August 2009) was a Scottish broadcaster. He was best known for DJing and presenting on Radio Forth and announcing on Wheel of Fortune.

== Biography ==
Hamilton was born on 24 February 1950 in Dumfries but grew up in Ayr owing to his father's operation of a motor car dealership there. He went to Carrick Academy, Ayr Academy, and the Royal School of Music and Drama, where the diploma in speech and drama he graduated with failed to rescue him from a job at Austin Reed in Princes Street. A later job as a props man at BBC TV in Glasgow brought his voice to the attention of the place's broadcasters who gave him his job at Radio Forth, which he began on 22 January 1975; at this point he changed his name to Steve from Roland James on the grounds that Roland didn't suit a DJ. In 1977, he joined STV as a newscaster and continuity announcer, remaining with both until 1988, the year in which he took a job narrating Wheel of Fortune. He kept this job for its initial 13-year run, being the only original cast member to stay with the show until the 14th series in 2001.

Until 1998 Hamilton was based in Edinburgh, at which point he relocated to Newtongrange, Midlothian "to see a bit of sky"; he would four years later launch the voice-coaching firm "Hamilton Agency" with his wife. His final years were spent doing voice-overs for television and radio adverts – at the time of his death he was the voice advertising King Robert II whisky in Mauritius – as an occasional actor (including bit parts Taggart, Take the High Road, and Monarch of the Glen), and training students for broadcasting jobs at a voice-coaching school.

== Personal life and death ==
Hamilton died of a heart attack. Hamilton was married three times; first to Maggie, his second wife Joan died of breast cancer in 1985, then to Jilly from 1988 until his death on 1 August 2009. He has a brother, Campbell, and two children Debbie and Nick.
