= Wheel of Fortune (British game show) =

British television game show

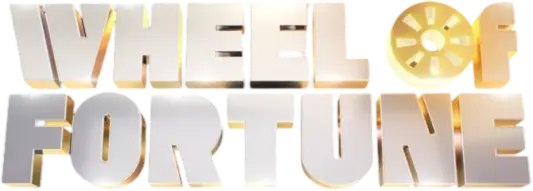
- Genre: Game show
- Based on: Wheel of Fortune by Merv Griffin
- Directed by: Anne Mason
- Presented by: Nicky Campbell; Bradley Walsh; John Leslie; Paul Hendy; Graham Norton
- Starring: Angela Ekaette; Carol Smillie; Jenny Powell; Terri Seymour
- Announcer: Steve Hamilton
- Theme music composer: Original run David Pringle; Bob Heatlie; 2024 revival John Hoke (Bleeding Fingers Music); Original theme composed by Merv Griffin (both uncredited)
- Opening theme: Original run "Spin to Win"; 2024 revival "Changing Keys" (2021 version)
- Ending theme: Original run "Spin to Win"; 2024 revival "Changing Keys" (2021 version)
- Country of origin: United Kingdom
- Original language: English
- No. of series: Original run: 14; 2024 revival: 3
- No. of episodes: Original run: 746; 2024 revival: 18 (Note: This is a number of episodes that have been broadcast as of 27 December 2025.)

Production
- Executive producers: Sandy Ross; Ian Jones; Rob Clark
- Producers: Anne Mason; Stephen Leahy; Sandy Ross
- Production location: Dock10 (2024–)
- Running time: Original run: ca. 24 minutes 2024 revival: ca. 47 minutes
- Production companies: Scottish Television Enterprises (1988–2001) (Note: Produced as SMG TV Productions in 2001. The series was produced in association with King World Productions, Columbia TriStar Television (1993–2001), Action Time Productions (1988–1989) and Buena Vista International UK (1988–1992, produced as The Walt Disney Company Ltd. for the first two seasons).); Whisper North (Note: In association with Sony Pictures Television and Paramount Global Content Distribution.) (2024–present)

Original release
- Network: ITV
- Release: 19 July 1988 – 21 December 2001
- Release: 6 January 2024 – present

Related
- Wheel of Fortune

Wheel of Fortune is a British television game show based on the American show of the same name created by Merv Griffin. Contestants compete to solve word puzzles, similar to those used in Hangman, to win cash and prizes. The title refers to the show's giant carnival wheel that contestants spin throughout the course of the game to determine their cash and/or prizes.

The programme was produced by Scottish Television Enterprises, and aired between 19 July 1988 and 21 December 2001 for ITV. It mostly follows the same general format from the original version of the programme from the United States, with a few minor differences.

On 27 June 2023, Whisper North, in association with Sony Pictures Television and Paramount Global Content Distribution, announced the production of a revival series for broadcast on ITV in 2024, with Graham Norton serving as presenter.

== Gameplay ==
=== Original series ===
Unlike the American version, where the numbers on the wheel correspond to the amount of money won by each contestant, the British version instead referred to these amounts as 'points'. These points have no cash value; their only purpose was to determine the grand finalist, or to choose a winner for a particular round. This was because, between 1960 and 1992, the Independent Broadcasting Authority and, for the last two years, its successor, the Independent Television Commission, imposed caps on the top prize game shows could give away per week, and standardising the prize on offer per episode ensured the programme did not breach the set limits.

Points earned from all players carried on to proceeding rounds, and only scores for the current round were susceptible to Bankrupts, meaning a winner could be crowned who had never solved a puzzle, but acquired a large number of points. This rule would encourage sacrificing a player's turn if he or she did not know the puzzle rather than risking his or her points by spinning again.

For the first three series, before the recording of each episode, each contestant spun the wheel; the contestant with the highest score would start the first round. In the programme proper, the contestant was asked a 50/50 trivia question, and if the contestant answered correctly, they spun the wheel. If the contestant landed on a number, they had to pick a letter. If the letter appeared on the puzzle board, the contestant earned the value multiplied by the number of times the letter appeared. A player was allowed to purchase a vowel for a flat rate of 250 points for any number of repetitions as long as that vowel appeared in the puzzle. The contestant would then spin the wheel again, but the contestant's turn would end if the contestant either (a) landed on a number but picked a letter that did not appear on the puzzle board, earning the contestant no points (but not deducting the number the contestant landed on); (b) bought a vowel that did not appear in the puzzle (still costing the 250 points); (c) landed on the "LOSE A TURN" space; (d) landed on the "BANKRUPT" space, losing the contestant's total score for that round (but not from previous rounds); or (e) attempting to solve the puzzle but giving an incorrect answer.

If the contestant landed on the "FREE SPIN", the contestant would be given a "FREE SPIN" token and would spin the wheel again. If the contestant landed on a number but picked a letter that did not appear on the puzzle board, or landed on the "LOSE A TURN" space or the "BANKRUPT" space, the contestant could give their "FREE SPIN" loop to the host and spin again. They could alternatively hand over play to the next contestant.

If the contestant answered the 50/50 trivia question incorrectly, they would not spin the wheel; play would move on to the next contestant.

In the speed round, the host would spin the wheel with the centre player's arrow determining the point value for each contestant. Vowels were worth nothing, and consonants were worth whatever the value spun. The left player would go first. No more 50/50 questions were asked.

From the fourth series onward, the 50/50 trivia individual questions were dropped. Instead, at the start of each round, the contestants would be asked a general knowledge question and the first contestant to buzz in and answer correctly would gain control of the wheel (this included the speed-up round).

Also from the fourth series onward, from Round 3 to the end, the points on the wheel were worth double (although the wheel did not show the values at double points).

The red, yellow or blue player's arrow determined the point value for each consonant in the speed-up round (and during the final spin both Walsh and Leslie employed the catchphrase "No more spinning, just winning!" while explaining how the speed-up round worked). Vowels were worth nothing, and consonants were worth the value spun. In case of a tie, each player tied for the lead spun the wheel and the player who spun the higher number went through. In the final series, this was replaced by a tie-break question on the buzzer, and whoever answered correctly first went into the final.

In the Grand Finale, the winning contestant chose from one of three bonus prizes to play for: a car, a luxury holiday, or a cash prize. The series in 1994 differed, in that the prize the contestant won for solving the puzzle was a car plus the cash prize of £10,000. In one episode in 1994, the prize was two cars and £10,000. From 1995 to 1998, the player chose one of two envelopes, one with the car and the other with £20,000. The prize chosen, the Grand Finale continued with the contestant choosing five consonants and a vowel. The contestant had 15 seconds to solve the puzzle to win the prize. Unlike other versions, the player could solve any one word individually, and then work on any other word in the puzzle. For example, if the puzzle was "A CUP OF TEA", the player could solve "OF", then "A", then "TEA", and finally "CUP" to complete the puzzle.

In the final series, "LOSE A TURN" was changed to "MISS A TURN", for reasons unknown, and a "500 Gamble" wedge was added. If a player landed on the latter wedge, they had the option of going for 500 points per letter or gambling their round score. If they chose to gamble their points and called a correct letter, their score would be doubled with 1,000 (2,000 starting in the third round) for each appearance of said consonant added to the sum; an incorrect letter was the same as Bankrupt.

In the rare event two or all three players were tied for first place, the host had each player spin the wheel once, and the highest number spun won the game. Spinning a "BANKRUPT," "LOSE A TURN/MISS A TURN," or "FREE SPIN" did not allow another spin and thus counted as a zero score.

=== Revival series ===
The rules of the 2024 version are modelled after the current format of the U.S. version of the show; each episode consists of at least six standard puzzle rounds, which have clues, replacing the usual categories. Some puzzles may be shown as crossword puzzles, as in which the words are linked together and the contestant may solve it by saying all of the words in any order without repeating or adding anything. The wheel now contains money amounts from £100 to £2,000, along with two "Prize" tokens that award a prize to the contestant who claims it regardless of the puzzle's outcome, but do not count towards their score. Vowels cost £100 each.

Rounds of toss-up puzzles are played before the first, third, fourth, and sixth puzzles, in which a puzzle is automatically filled in one letter at a time. The first contestant to buzz in and solve the puzzle receives £500 during the first two rounds, or £1,000 during the last two rounds. Each toss-up round consists of three consecutive puzzles of the same clue, similarly to the "Triple Toss-Up" round played in the American version.

The contestant who solves the third puzzle plays a bonus round, in a similar fashion of the American version; after selecting one of three categories, the puzzle is displayed with all instances of R, S, T, L, N, and E revealed, and the contestant must choose three more consonants and another vowel. After all instances of the chosen letters are revealed, if the contestant can solve the puzzle within ten seconds, they win a bonus prize. In celebrity specials, the bonus prize is £5,000.

The final round is played in a "speed-up" format, with the amount spun on the host's final spin being the value of each consonant. Whoever has the highest total winnings after the final round is declared the winner, and plays a bonus round similar to earlier in the show. This time, the bonus round is played for cash, with the prize determined by spinning a smaller wheel, similar to that of the American version, containing 24 envelopes with values ranging from £10,000 (Note: For the first three episodes: £15,000.) to £50,000.

In the second series in 2025, some minor tweaks have been made. All toss-up puzzles are worth £500 in all four rounds, but if a contestant answers all three in one round, their winnings are doubled to £3,000. From round three, a "Wild Card" is added to the wheel, if the contestant lands on that space and gives a correct letter, they take the card and immediately earn an extra £500 to their round score, and the "Wild Card" allows them to pick an extra consonant at any time during the game, including the final bonus round should they get that far. Finally, from round four, the Prize tokens are replaced with a "Double or Nothing" gamble. If a contestant lands on one of those two spaces and gives a correct letter, they can decide whether to take the gamble or play on. If they choose to take the gamble and reveal a "Double", their entire round score is doubled immediately, but if they reveal a "Nothing", they are bankrupted immediately and lose control of the wheel.

In the third series in 2026, the "Wild Card" space is on the wheel from round one and a new "Bankrupt" shield has been added. Should the contestant land on that space and gives a correct letter, they can take the shield and should they land on a bankrupt space, they can decide whether or not to use the shield, allowing them to protect their current round score and keep control of the wheel. The "Bankrupt" shield can only be used once during the game if earned.

== Prizes ==
=== Original run ===
Unlike the original American version, instead of cash prizes, successful spinners from each round were rewarded with a choice of three prizes which might contain household appliances, a holiday, etc. In 1988, the prizes for the final were a trip (an oriental furnished living room on 6 September and a luxury bathroom on 13 September), a new car (or sometimes a new boat), or a cash jackpot at £3,000 (£2,000 on the last two episodes of the first series). In 1989, the cash value increased to £4,000, from 1993 the cash value increased again to £5,000. On the celebrity specials, solving the final puzzle donated £5,000 to the celebrity's favourite charity. During the 1994 series, solving the final puzzle won both £10,000 and a new car. In some episodes in 1994 this was increased to two cars and £10,000. The prize was later increased to £20,000 or a car from 1995 to 1998, with the winning contestant randomly selecting his/her prize by choosing one of two sealed envelopes.

During the daytime series, winners of each round could choose from an array of prizes laid out on stage, (CD player, dishwasher, etc.) The cash prize for the final puzzle was dropped to £2,000. Players could also pick the same prize more than once and on some occasions, contestants made requests for an opponent who had won nothing to pick a prize, and Leslie always upheld the request.

All contestants in all series, win or lose, went home with a Wheel of Fortune watch (and sometimes other WoF-related merchandise).

In the final, the winning contestant had a free choice of five consonants and one vowel in order to help identify the answer within 15 seconds and win the prize.

==== Special prizes ====
- During the primetime series, the second and third round began with the hostess presenting a special prize (usually jewellery) which could be won by landing on a prize star and going on to solve the puzzle.
- During Bradley Walsh's run, the first player in the third round to land on a special disc and also put a letter on the board won the contents of "Brad's Box". This bonus carried over into the prime time John Leslie series and was renamed "Leslie's Luxury" but during Leslie's series, there were two boxes; one would be for the men, and the other one would be for the women (prime time series).
- Starting in 1996, one puzzle would contain a "cash pot" letter (gold in 1996 and 1997, red thereafter) which would net that player £100 for solving the puzzle immediately after finding the letter (both formats).
- The winning contestant had a chance to win another £100 by guessing a special, partially-revealed "puzzler" related to the puzzle just solved. (daytime series).
- During the second round on the daily series, a mystery prize would be awarded to the contestant if he/she picked up the token and solved the round two puzzle.

=== 2024 revival ===
For the 2024 revival, the contestants played for cash. Prizes on the wheel include gift certificates and trips. The prize for the midway bonus round is a luxury holiday. In celebrity specials, the prize for the midway bonus round is £5,000.

The bonus round wheel contains 24 envelopes with various cash amounts from £10,000 to £50,000.

== Special episodes ==
On occasion, the series has had several episodes featuring specific kinds of contestants:

- On the ninth episode of the second series and the eleventh episode of the fourth series, the contestants were all women engaged to be married. The puzzles on both shows were all wedding related.
- On the twelfth episode of the third series and the eleventh episode of the fourth series, the contestants (two women and one man) were retired.

== Studio designs ==
From 1988 to 1993, the host would emerge from the right stairs. Then as the presenter introduces the letter spinner, the letter spinner would walk down the left stairs. Between 1994 and 2000, the host and the letter spinner would emerge from the puzzle board that rotated clockwise. After the show's switch to widescreen in 2001, the host and the letter spinner would emerge from the prize pod.

The original design of the wheel was based on the American design, placed above ground on top of layers with lights. From 1994 to the end, the wheel was placed on the ground.

The 2024 revival borrows some of the elements from the original American version. The host would emerge from the top of the stairs between the audience. The puzzle board is now a digital screen, however lacks touchscreen functionality due to the lack of co-host.

== Wheel configurations ==
Round one wheel configurations

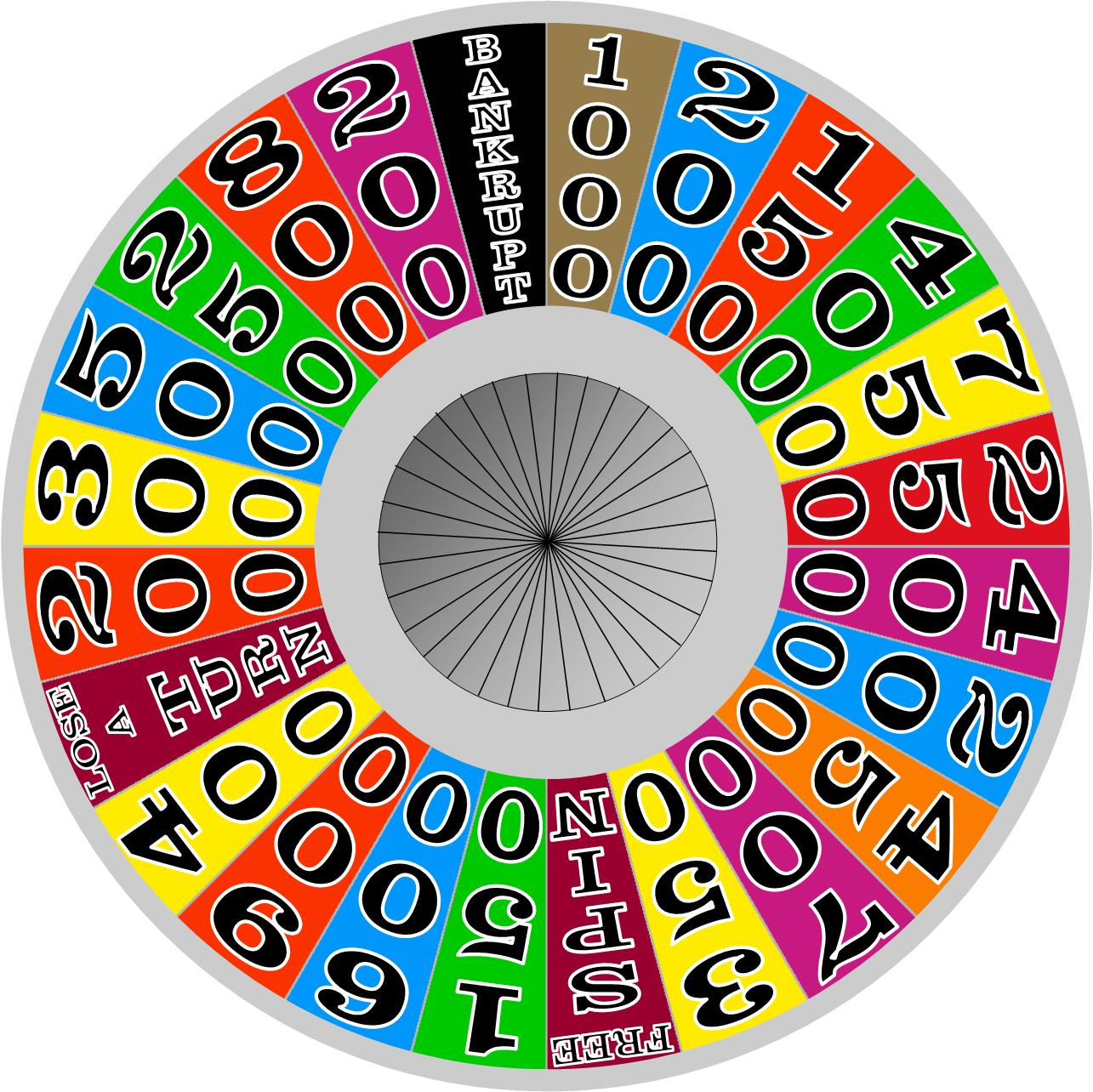
1988 to 1991 (Series 1–3) (Note: In 1990, this layout was reversed and the red 250 next to 750 was decreased to 200. The resulting layout was used until 1991.)

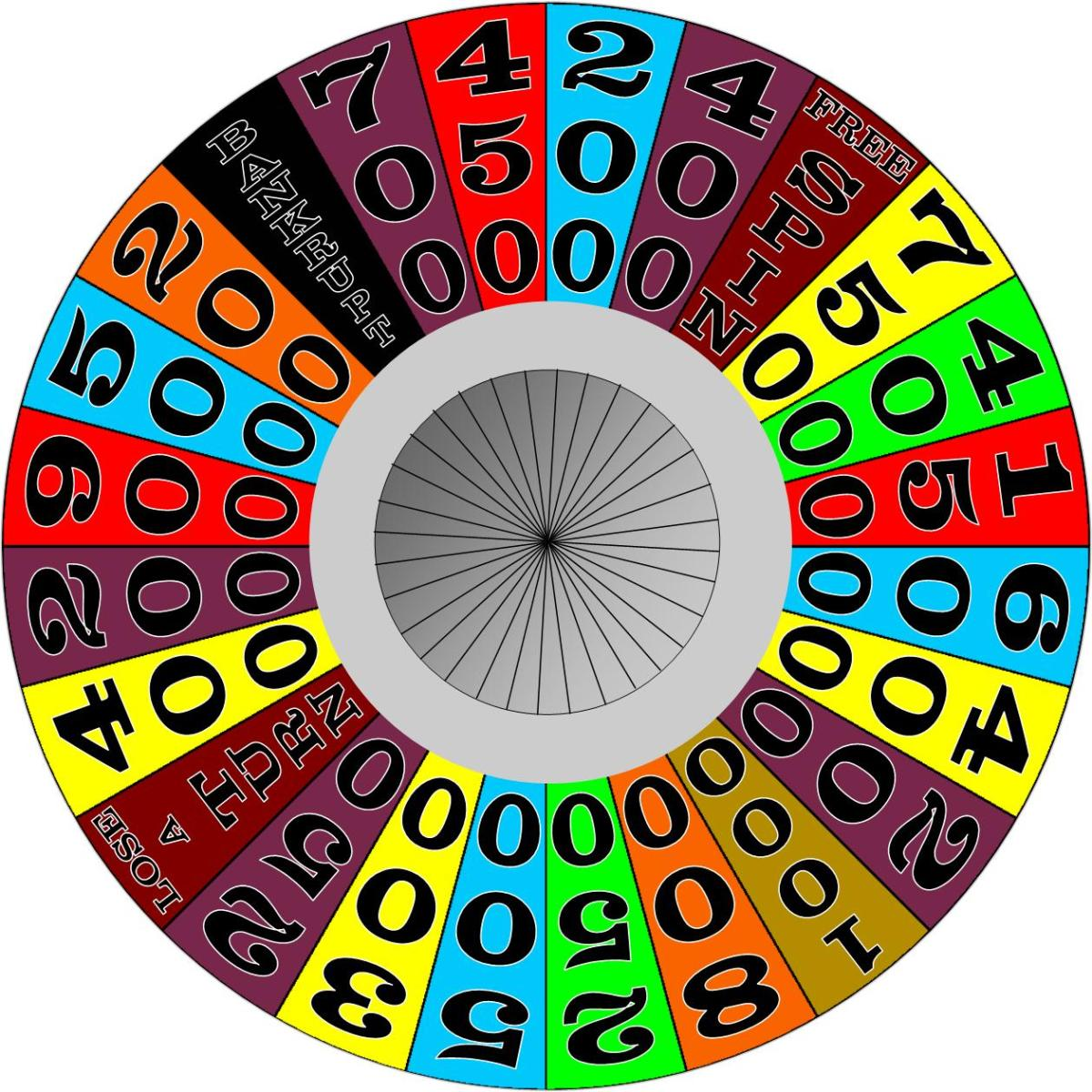
1992 to 1993 (Series 4–5)

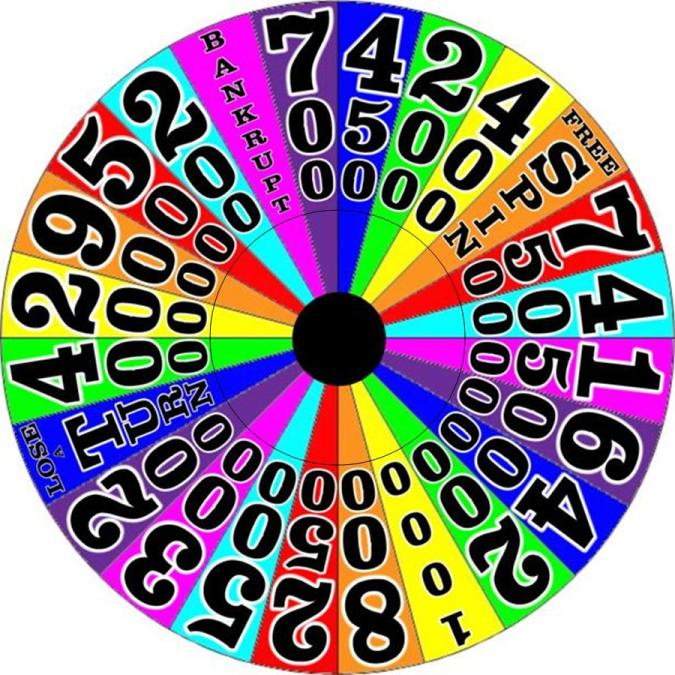
1994 to 2000 (Series 6–12)

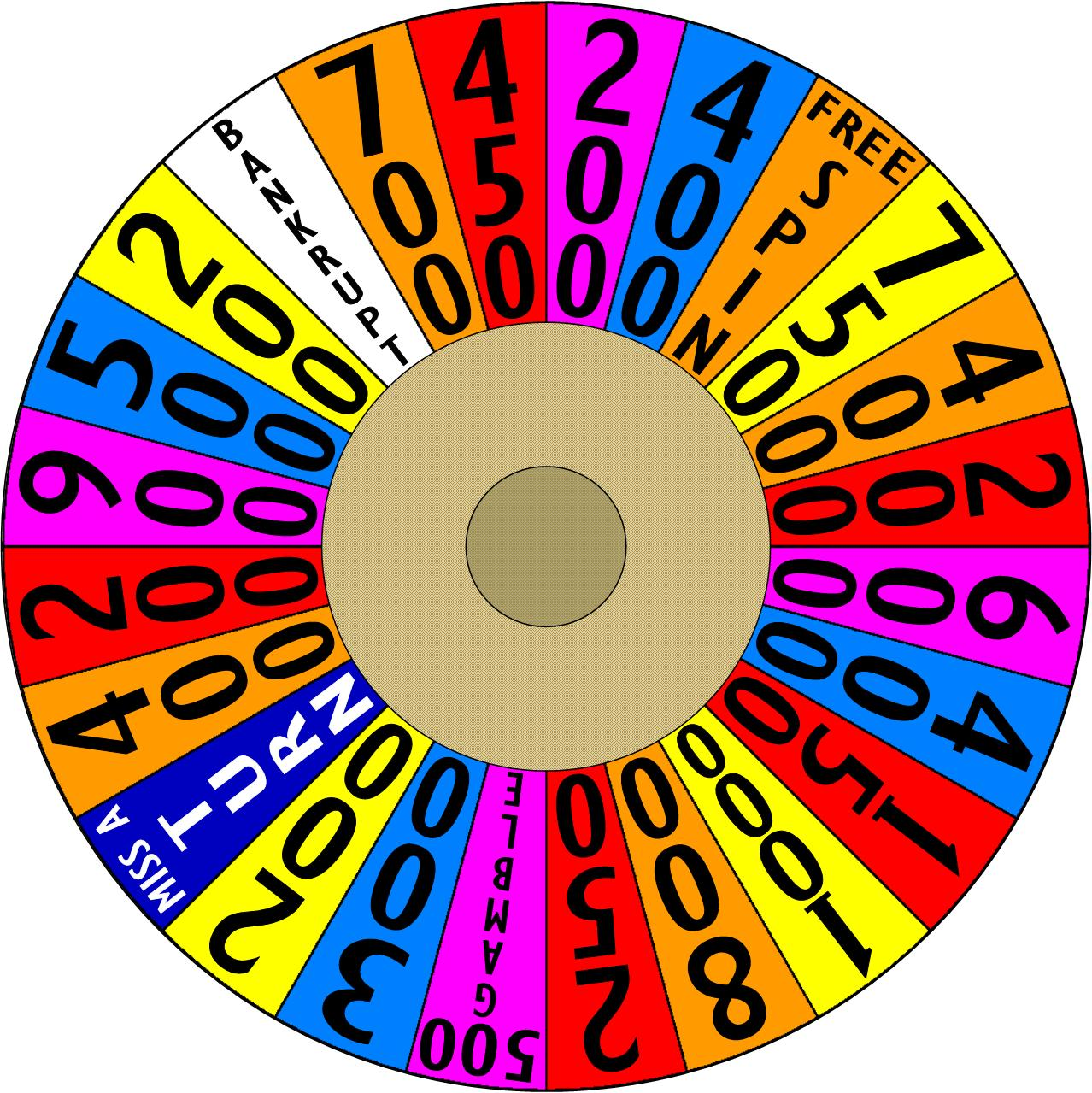
2001 (Series 13–14)

The top point space was 1000 points, with one such space in round 1. One more space was added in round 2, along with a second Bankrupt, and a third 1,000-point space was added in round 3. Also, starting from series 4 in 1992, values were doubled beginning from round 3 onward, making the top point spaces worth 2,000 points. For the third series in 1991 only, a third Bankrupt was added in round 3.

Unlike the board used on the American version since 1997, the United Kingdom version's puzzle board was never electronic until 2024, so the regular puzzle would be placed at the top portion of the board while the puzzler would fill any unused lines below. The puzzle board's shape from 1994 to early 2000 was the same as the current American puzzle board. From 1988 to 1993, its border was styled like the one on the American puzzle board used from 1981 to 1993. The background colour for unused trilons on the UK's puzzle board was green from 1988 to 1993, after which it was changed to blue.

In 2001, "Lose A Turn" was renamed "Miss A Turn" and a "500 Gamble" space was added. When "500 Gamble" was landed on, the player had a choice of going for the regular 500 points or gambling their round score on a correct letter. If the contestant chose to gamble, each appearance of a correct letter increased their score by 1,000 points plus their current score while an incorrect letter took away all the points they accumulated in the round.

In 2024, the wheel gained another refresh in configurations, but is stylized similarly to the 1988 and 1993 era board. "Miss a Turn" was renamed back to the original "Lose a Turn" name, and is now white with black lettering instead of dark red or dark blue with black or white lettering. The "500 Gamble" space from the 2001 seasons and the "Free Spin" space were removed, while the "Bankrupt" space was changed back to black instead of green, pink or white with white lettering instead of with black lettering. The top pound value space is £500 in the first round, and £1,000 in the fifth round, then £2,000 in the final round (which also included two "Bankrupt" spaces; as akin to the Million Dollar Wedge in the American version, as well as the $10,000 wedge in the past).

In 2025, the £2,000/Bankrupt wedge in the final round was not retained. Instead, the wheel in the final round featured three separate £1,000 spaces and two separate bankrupt spaces.

=== Wrong way spin outtake ===
One notable outtake from the show involved a man who spun the wheel in the wrong direction, forcing the show to be postponed until the next day. As the British wheel has a gearing mechanism to regulate its speed, this action promptly broke said gears and the studio technicians spent hours trying to fix it.

== Transmissions ==
=== Original series ===
Series	Start date	End date	Episodes	Host(s)	
1	19 July 1988	27 September 1988	11	Nicky Campbell	Angela Ekaette
2	5 September 1989	19 December 1989	16	Nicky Campbell	Carol Smillie
3	4 June 1991	29 August 1991	13	Nicky Campbell	Carol Smillie
4	18 May 1992	24 August 1992	13	Nicky Campbell	Carol Smillie
5	7 June 1993	30 August 1993	13	Nicky Campbell	Carol Smillie
6	11 July 1994	12 December 1994	23	Nicky Campbell	Carol Smillie
7	30 August 1995	27 December 1995	18	Nicky Campbell	Jenny Powell
8	24 July 1996	31 December 1996	24	Nicky Campbell	Jenny Powell
9	3 January 1997	27 December 1997	50	Bradley Walsh	Jenny Powell
10	1 June 1998	30 November 1998	26	John Leslie	Jenny Powell
11	2 March 1999	20 December 1999	135	John Leslie	Jenny Powell
12	3 January 2000	8 December 2000	250	John Leslie	Jenny Powell
13	2 January 2001	4 August 2001	125	John Leslie	Terri Seymour
14	12 November 2001	21 December 2001	30	Paul Hendy	Terri Seymour

==== Specials ====
Date	Entitle
22 December 1988	Christmas Soap Stars Special
29 December 1988	Christmas Celebrity Special
31 December 1988	Hogmanay Special
26 December 1989	Christmas Celebrity Special
31 December 1989	Hogmanay Special

The two Hogmanay Specials were only broadcast to the Scottish and Grampian Television regions.

- 1988: With Amanda Laird, Teri Lally and Andy Cameron.
- 1989: With Andy Cameron, Paul Coia and Viv Lumsden.

==== Regional transmissions information ====
===== 1988–1998 =====
For the first ten series, the show was broadcast once a week in a primetime slot. With series 8, a number of regional ITV stations did broadcast episodes a few days later including the last episode on 31 December 1996.

===== 1999 =====
During the eleventh series, the programme was moved to a five-shows-a-week daytime slot and it aired at 2.40pm each afternoon from 2 March, after the sixth series of Dale's Supermarket Sweep concluded its run. It took a break from 28 May to 10 September 1999.

===== 2000 =====
The twelfth series began at the start of the year, and lasted until the start of December. During this series, the show's slot varied in different ITV regions.

- Carlton (London and Westcountry), Grampian and Scottish aired the episodes at 5:30pm.
- Anglia, Border, Granada, Meridian, Tyne Tees, Ulster and Yorkshire aired the episodes at 2:40pm until 31 March 2000, then Friday afternoons only from 18 May to 9 June. From 12 June, it was moved back to five-times-a-week at 1.30pm and then from 17 July, it was moved back to 2:40pm when the seventh series of Dale's Supermarket Sweep took a break, so not all the episodes aired.
- HTV followed Anglia's pattern until 8 May before switching to the 5:30pm slot.
- Carlton (Central) also followed Anglia's pattern until 12 June before moving the show to 5.30pm.

Additional episodes were broadcast by all ITV regions on Sundays during May.

===== 2001 =====
During the thirteenth series, most ITV regions broadcast episodes at 5.30pm from 2 January to 22 June 2001, except for Meridian, Yorkshire, Tyne Tees, before being switched to a Saturday afternoon slot until 4 August 2001. The final thirty episodes (series fourteen) were networked at 2.40pm, from 12 November to 21 December.

=== Revival series ===
A non-broadcast pilot was originally recorded in 2020 with Alison Hammond as presenter, but ITV announced in June 2022 that they would not go forward on a full series.

On 27 June 2023, it was announced that ITV had commissioned a revival of the game show to air on ITV1 and ITVX in January 2024, with the revival being produced by Whisper North, a division of Sony Pictures Television-backed Whisper TV, in association with Sony Pictures Television and Paramount Global Content Distribution; in addition, Graham Norton was announced to be the new presenter. The first series of the revival ran for eight episodes, which included two celebrity specials. The programme has since been renewed for two additional nine-episode series, with series 16 airing from December 2024 to March 2025, and series 17 which aired from December 2025 to March 2026. A fourth six-episode series is set to air in 2027.

Series overall	Series	Start date	End date	Episodes
15	1	6 January 2024	2 March 2024	8 (Note: This series consists of 6 regular episodes and 2 celebrity specials.)
16	2	28 December 2024	15 March 2025	9
17	3	27 December 2025	14 March 2026	9
18	4	2027	2027	6
