= John Leslie (TV presenter) =

Scottish television presenter (born 1965)

- Born: John Leslie Stott; 22 February 1965 (age 61); Edinburgh, Scotland
- Other name: John Leslie Stott
- Occupation: Television presenter
- Years active: 1982–present
- Known for: Blue Peter; Wheel of Fortune; This Morning

John Leslie Stott (born 22 February 1965), known as John Leslie, is a Scottish former television and radio presenter. Debuting on the Music Box channel in 1987, he later presented BBC One's Blue Peter, and ITV's This Morning and the gameshow Wheel of Fortune. He was also the studio host for the first series of the UK version of Survivor.

== Early life and career ==
John Leslie Stott was born in Edinburgh, the brother of Grant Stott. He attended Liberton High School and James Gillespie's High School. Leslie spent his early years in the church choir, studied music on leaving school, and worked as a DJ in Copenhagen. Prior to his television career he worked as a DJ in nightclubs in Edinburgh and Newcastle, becoming resident DJ at the Blu Bambu club.

His first television work was on Yorkshire Television, when he hosted Music Box's all-night music show, Formula One which was the English language version of the German TV music show which was shown on Super Channel and in some ITV regions in 1987 and 1988 where he would link music performances from the German original from a UK studio, in 1989.

== Personal life ==
Leslie had a widely publicised relationship with nurse Abi Titmuss, who became a star in her own right when a video Leslie filmed of her having sex with another woman was leaked.

He is a supporter of Hibernian.

Leslie now works in property development and lives with his girlfriend Kate Moore.

== Sexual assault allegations ==
In October 2002, Ulrika Jonsson had written in her autobiography, Honest, that "an acquaintance" had raped her when she was 19. Amid media speculation, television presenter Matthew Wright named Leslie as the alleged rapist on The Wright Stuff. Jonsson has never said whether the correct person was named, and Leslie was never charged for offences against Jonsson. Wright apologised to Leslie and said he named him in error. Despite this, the story was widely covered in tabloid newspapers.

Other women made accusations of sexual offences against Leslie, and he was arrested in December 2002 on one count of rape and two concerning indecent assault, then released on bail after being interviewed by the police. He was charged in June 2003 with indecently assaulting a woman twice between 25 and 28 May 1997. The prosecution dropped the charges against Leslie at Southwark Crown Court on 31 July 2003 after new information from the alleged victim. On the court steps after the end of the hearing, Leslie said that he had "been to hell and back" and that he had "maintained [his] innocence throughout".

Leslie was charged with sexually assaulting a woman at a nightclub in June 2017. In July 2018, after a two-day trial at Edinburgh Sheriff Court, the charges were found not proven, and Leslie was acquitted. Leslie stated that he was going to make a complaint against Police Scotland.

In June 2019, Leslie was charged with sexually assaulting a 30-year-old woman in Westminster during December 2008. In August 2019, Leslie pleaded not guilty at Southwark Crown Court and was released on bail. He was subsequently acquitted in October 2020.

== Television ==
=== Blue Peter ===
On 20 April 1989, Leslie became Blue Peter's first Scottish presenter, and also the tallest at 1.93 metres (6 ft 4 in). He was the second Blue Peter presenter to take part in the London Marathon, following Peter Duncan. He finished in 4 hours 36 minutes.

On his last show he was set John's Final Challenge which involved abseiling down BBC Television Centre, completing a velcro and wheelbarrow obstacle course, then trampolining and conducting an orchestra in the studio. Leslie presented Blue Peter with Caron Keating, Yvette Fielding, Diane-Louise Jordan, Anthea Turner and Tim Vincent.

=== Wheel of Fortune ===
Leslie succeeded Nicky Campbell as the main presenter of the British version of Wheel of Fortune. He was succeeded in 2001 by Paul Hendy. That year, he turned up on Lily Savage's Blankety Blank.

=== This Morning ===
From series 11 in 1999 Leslie, alongside Fern Britton, was a regular presenter of the Friday edition. When Richard Madeley and Judy Finnigan departed the show in 2001, they were replaced by Coleen Nolan and Twiggy, with Britton and Leslie remaining on Fridays. Nolan and Twiggy proved less popular with viewers, so Britton and Leslie took on the full job of presenting the show, bringing the ratings back up to around one million. In 2002, after allegations of sexual offences were made in the press against Leslie, he was dismissed from the programme.

== Music and radio ==
In November 2012, John Leslie began to present Friday's Drivetime show on 98.8 Castle FM, hoping to revive his career as a radio DJ. In March 2013, Leslie was among the Castle FM presenters who walked out in a disagreement with their management, only to be locked out when they tried to return. By the end of the year, the radio station had become automated, with no presenters.

On 28 March 2014, it was announced that Leslie would begin presenting his own Saturday (10:00 to 14:00) radio show across the Scottish Bauer Radio AM network, debuting the following day.

== Filmography ==
- Formula One (1989)
- Blue Peter (1989–1994)
- Future Cooks (1993)
- Scavengers (1994–95)
- Mega Machines (narrator) (1995)
- Style Challenge (1996–1998)
- Wheel of Fortune (1998–2001)
- This Morning (1999–2002)
- Was It Good for You? (1999)
- Survivor (2001)
