= Batford =

Coordinates: 51.82°N 00.34°W

- Location within Hertfordshire
- OS grid reference: TL146156
- Shire county: Hertfordshire
- Region: East
- Country: England
- Sovereign state: United Kingdom
- Post town: Harpenden
- Postcode district: AL5
- Police: Hertfordshire
- Fire: Hertfordshire
- Ambulance: East of England

Batford is a village in Hertfordshire, England, located on the River Lea on the outskirts of Harpenden. Batford Springs is a local nature reserve alongside the river and the village green, which has a small play area for children. The large red brick building at the southern end of the village between the river and the Lower Luton Road was originally a water mill. It is now used as offices, and the river has been diverted around the building. Batford Methodist Church built in 1905 and shows the distinctive "modern" architecture of that time.

During World War II a large prisoner of war camp was located in Batford, adjoining what is now Common Lane, and prisoners were present there until about 1947. When they had gone, the camp buildings were used to house local people who were waiting for housing, which was in short supply at the time. Within a few years, a large housing estate was built on the site of the POW camp by the local authority.

Batford has a Tesco Express/filling station, a Co-op supermarket, a fish and chip shop, two pubs, an Indian takeaway, and various other shops and small factory units. It also has a school, Katherine Warington School, to the east of the village.

It is in the civil parish of Harpenden.

== See also ==
- Batford Springs
