= 2001 Hertfordshire County Council election =

2001 UK local government election

- 7 June 2001

All 77 seats to Hertfordshire County Council 39 seats needed for a majority
	First party	Second party	Third party
	Con	Lab	LD
Leader	Robert Ellis
Party	Conservative	Labour	Liberal Democrats
Seats won	40	27	10
Seat change	▲1	▼2	▲1
Popular vote	196,640	162,809	113,988
Percentage	40.9%	33.8%	23.7%
Swing	▲0.8%	▼1.4%	▼0.5%
- 2001 local election results in Hertfordshire
Leader before election
Robert Ellis
Conservative
Leader after election
Robert Ellis
Conservative

2001 Hertfordshire County Council elections were held on 7 June 2001, with all 77 seats contested. The council remained under Conservative control, with the party winning 40 of the 77 seats.

== Results summary ==
Hertfordshire County Council election results 2001
Party	Seats	Gains	Losses	Net gain/loss	Seats %	Votes %	Votes	+/−
Conservative	40	0	0	▲2	52.0	40.9	196,640	+0.7
Labour	27	0	0	▼3	35.1	33.8	162,809	-1.3
Liberal Democrats	10	0	0	▲1	13.0	23.7	113,988	-0.4
Green	0	0	0	Steady	0.0	1.3	6,258	+1.2
BNP	0	0	0	Steady	0.0	0.1	500	N/A
Independent	0	0	0	Steady	0.0	0.1	435	-0.3
NCDMV!	0	0	0	Steady	0.0	0.1	371	N/A
Socialist Alliance	0	0	0	Steady	0.0	>0.1	210	±0.0
Socialist	0	0	0	Steady	0.0	>0.1	131	N/A

=== By ward ===
Broxbourne District County Council election results 2001
Party	Seats	Gains	Losses	Net gain/loss	Seats %	Votes %	Votes	+/−
Conservative	6	0	0	+6	100.00	54.50	19,176	
Labour	0	0	0	0	0.00	31.47	11,073	
Liberal Democrats	0	0	0	0	0.00	12.61	4,438	
BNP	0	0	0	0	0.00	1.42	500	

Dacorum District County Council election results 2001
Party	Seats	Gains	Losses	Net gain/loss	Seats %	Votes %	Votes	+/−
Conservative	7	0	0	+7	70.00	41.44	27,819	
Labour	3	0	0	+3	30.00	34.78	23,348	
Liberal Democrats	0	0	0	0	0.00	20.92	14,042	
Green	0	0	0	0	0.00	2.69	1,806	
Socialist Alliance	0	0	0	0	0.00	0.17	114	

East Herts District County Council election results 2001
Party	Seats	Gains	Losses	Net gain/loss	Seats %	Votes %	Votes	+/−
Conservative	10	0	0	+10	100.00	47.85	29,660	
Labour	0	0	0	0	0.00	27.52	17,059	
Liberal Democrats	0	0	0	0	0.00	22.31	13,827	
Green	0	0	0	0	0.00	2.32	1,437	

Hertsmere District County Council election results 2001
Party	Seats	Gains	Losses	Net gain/loss	Seats %	Votes %	Votes	+/−
Conservative	4	0	0	+4	57.13	45.76	18,907	
Labour	2	0	0	+2	28.58	31.74	13,114	
Liberal Democrats	1	0	0	+1	14.29	22.04	9,108	
Independent	0	0	0	0	0.00	0.46	190	

North Herts District County Council election results 2001
Party	Seats	Gains	Losses	Net gain/loss	Seats %	Votes %	Votes	+/−
Conservative	5	0	0	+5	55.55	41.56	24,330	
Labour	3	0	0	+3	33.33	34.70	20,313	
Liberal Democrats	1	0	0	+1	11.12	22.68	13,278	
Green	0	0	0	0	0.00	1.06	618	

St Albans District County Council election results 2001
Party	Seats	Gains	Losses	Net gain/loss	Seats %	Votes %	Votes	+/−
Conservative	3	0	0	+3	30.00	36.46	22,739	
Liberal Democrats	3	0	0	+3	30.00	33.04	20,606	
Labour	4	0	0	+4	40.00	29.74	18,547	
NCDMV!	0	0	0	0	0.00	0.59	371	
Socialist Alliance	0	0	0	0	0.00	0.15	96	

Stevenage District County Council election results 2001
Party	Seats	Gains	Losses	Net gain/loss	Seats %	Votes %	Votes	+/−
Labour	6	0	0	+6	100.00	52.84	18,315	
Conservative	0	0	0	0	0.00	26.89	9,320	
Liberal Democrats	0	0	0	0	0.00	18.19	6,307	
Green	0	0	0	0	0.00	1.70	591	
Socialist	0	0	0	0	0.00	0.38	131	

Three Rivers District County Council election results 2001
Party	Seats	Gains	Losses	Net gain/loss	Seats %	Votes %	Votes	+/−
Conservative	2	0	0	+2	33.33	38.75	14,877	
Liberal Democrats	3	0	0	+3	50.00	37.91	14,555	
Labour	1	0	0	+1	16.67	23.34	8,962	

Watford District County Council election results 2001
Party	Seats	Gains	Losses	Net gain/loss	Seats %	Votes %	Votes	+/−
Labour	3	0	0	+3	50.00	39.16	14,150	
Conservative	1	0	0	+1	16.67	28.84	10,421	
Liberal Democrats	2	0	0	+2	33.33	27.36	9,886	
Green	0	0	0	0	0.00	3.97	1,434	
Independent	0	0	0	0	0.00	0.68	245	

Welwyn Hatfield District County Council election results 2001
Party	Seats	Gains	Losses	Net gain/loss	Seats %	Votes %	Votes	+/−
Conservative	2	0	0	+2	28.57	42.49	19,391	
Labour	5	0	0	+5	71.43	39.29	17.928	
Liberal Democrats	0	0	0	0	0.00	17.40	7,941	
Green	0	0	0	0	0.00	0.82	372	

== Division results ==
=== Broxbourne (6 seats) ===
Cheshunt Central 7 June 2001 Broxbourne District
Party	Candidate	Votes	%
Conservative	Moyra O'Neill	3,107	52.59
Labour	Carolyn Iles	1,896	32.09
Liberal Democrats	Michael Gould	663	11.22
BNP	John Cope	242	4.10
Majority		1,211	20.50
Turnout		5,908	53.90

Flamstead End & Turnford 7 June 2001 Broxbourne District
Party	Candidate	Votes	%
Conservative	Gerald Game	3,268	52.59
Labour	Glenn Craig	2,093	32.95
Liberal Democrats	Nicholas Garton	733	11.54
BNP	Ramon Johns	258	4.06
Majority		1,175	18.50
Turnout		6,352	52.80

Goffs Oak & Bury Green 7 June 2001 Broxbourne District
Party	Candidate	Votes	%
Conservative	Michael Janes	3,578	61.88
Labour	Brian Mercer	1,545	26.72
Liberal Democrats	Michael Winrow	659	11.40
Majority		2,033	35.16
Turnout		5,782	56.90

Hoddesdon North 7 June 2001 Broxbourne District
Party	Candidate	Votes	%
Conservative	John Morton	2,893	51.43
Labour	Neil Harvey	1,932	34.35
Liberal Democrats	Fraser Scott	800	14.22
Majority		961	17.08
Turnout		5,625	56.90

Hoddesdon South 7 June 2001 Broxbourne District
Party	Candidate	Votes	%
Conservative	Alan Searing	3,871	58.05
Labour	Malcolm Aitken	1,709	25.63
Liberal Democrats	Andrew Porrer	1,088	16.32
Majority		2,162	32.42
Turnout		6,668	55.20

Waltham Cross 7 June 2001 Broxbourne District
Party	Candidate	Votes	%
Conservative	Dennis Clayton	2,456	50.65
Labour	Linda Dambrauskas	1,898	39.14
Liberal Democrats	Henry Appiah	495	10.21
Majority		558	11.51
Turnout		4,849	50.40

=== Dacorum (10 seats) ===
Berkhampstead 7 June 2001 Dacorum District
Party	Candidate	Votes	%
Conservative	Kenneth Coleman	3,335	39.87
Liberal Democrats	Andrew Horton	3,028	36.20
Labour	Ray Jones	1,596	19.08
Green	Diana Jones	406	4.85
Majority		307	3.67
Turnout		8,365	66.30

Bridgewater 7 June 2001 Dacorum District
Party	Candidate	Votes	%
Conservative	Julian Taunton	3,125	54.97
Labour	Anne Harradine	1,271	22.36
Liberal Democrats	Barry Batchelor	998	17.55
Green	David Metcalfe	291	5.12
Majority		1,854	32.61
Turnout		5,685	68.70

Hemel Hempstead East 7 June 2001 Dacorum District
Party	Candidate	Votes	%
Conservative	Peter Channell	2,904	45.15
Labour	Richard Hebborn	2,670	41.51
Liberal Democrats	Rodney Cottrell	858	13.34
Majority		234	3.64
Turnout		6,432	66.50

Hemel Hempstead North East 7 June 2001 Dacorum District
Party	Candidate	Votes	%
Conservative	Fiona Guest	2,604	46.80
Labour	Brian Wing	2,059	37.01
Liberal Democrats	Michael Bethune	901	16.19
Majority		545	9.79
Turnout		5,564	55.70

Hemel Hempstead North West 7 June 2001 Dacorum District
Party	Candidate	Votes	%
Labour	Ian Laidlaw-Dickson	3,788	51.69
Conservative	Janice Speaight	2,457	33.52
Liberal Democrats	Raymond Hardy	1,084	14.79
Majority		1,331	18.17
Turnout		7,329	64.40

Hemel Hempstead St Paul 7 June 2001 Dacorum District
Party	Candidate	Votes	%
Labour	Elamthalaiva Singham	2,759	51.48
Conservative	Colin Peter	1,497	27.92
Liberal Democrats	Brenda Link	1,104	20.60
Majority		1,262	23.56
Turnout		5,360	60.20

Hemel Hempstead South East 7 June 2001 Dacorum District
Party	Candidate	Votes	%
Labour	Gary Cook	3,426	51.77
Conservative	Michael Clark	2,209	33.38
Liberal Democrats	John Blackman	869	13.13
Socialist Alliance	Stephen Harrison	114	1.72
Majority		1,217	18.39
Turnout		6,618	62.40

Hemel Hempstead Town 7 June 2001 Dacorum District
Party	Candidate	Votes	%
Conservative	David Lloyd	2,728	40.26
Labour	Albert Dennison	2,611	38.54
Liberal Democrats	Carol Richardson	1,132	16.71
Green	Paul Sanford	304	4.49
Majority		117	1.72
Turnout		6,775	66.40

Kings Langley 7 June 2001 Dacorum District
Party	Candidate	Votes	%
Conservative	Janet Anderson	3,497	51.15
Labour	Martin Smith	1,743	25.49
Liberal Democrats	Gerald Coulter	1,224	17.91
Green	Martin Humphrey	373	5.45
Majority		1,754	25.66
Turnout		6,837	67.40

Tring 7 June 2001 Dacorum District
Party	Candidate	Votes	%
Conservative	Stanley Mills	3,463	42.42
Liberal Democrats	Nicholas Hollinghurst	2,844	34.84
Labour	Paul Stanton	1,425	17.45
Green	John Hall	432	5.29
Majority		619	7.58
Turnout		8,164	69.40

=== East Herts (10 seats) ===
All Saints 7 June 2001 East Herts District
Party	Candidate	Votes	%
Conservative	Francis Escott	2,479	41.14
Labour	Kate Scarth	1,998	33.16
Liberal Democrats	Beryl Wrangles	1,549	25.70
Majority		481	7.98
Turnout		6,026	65.00

Bishop's Stortford East 7 June 2001 East Herts District
Party	Candidate	Votes	%
Conservative	Bernard Engel	2,343	39.52
Liberal Democrats	Michael Wood	2,171	36.62
Labour	John Boyle	1,173	19.79
Green	Kevin Foxall	241	4.07
Majority		172	2.90
Turnout		5,928	63.10

Bishop's Stortford Rural 7 June 2001 East Herts District
Party	Candidate	Votes	%
Conservative	Mary Bayes	3,131	51.20
Liberal Democrats	Andrew Graham	1,356	22.17
Labour	Heather Deegan	1,348	22.05
Green	Bryan Evans	280	4.58
Majority		1,775	29.03
Turnout		6,115	62.40

Bishop's Stortford West 7 June 2001 East Herts District
Party	Candidate	Votes	%
Conservative	Duncan Peek	2,569	40.71
Labour	Julia Madell	1,775	28.14
Liberal Democrats	Gerald Francis	1,695	26.86
Green	Graham White	271	4.29
Majority		794	12.57
Turnout		6,310	61.00

Braughing 7 June 2001 East Herts District
Party	Candidate	Votes	%
Conservative	Jane Pitman	3,508	54.52
Labour	Peter Mardell	1,842	28.62
Liberal Democrats	John Winder	1,085	16.86
Majority		1,666	25.90
Turnout		6,435	67.00

Hertford Rural 7 June 2001 East Herts District
Party	Candidate	Votes	%
Conservative	Bryan Hammond	3,400	53.25
Labour	Peter Warren	1,628	25.50
Liberal Democrats	Martin Harris	988	15.47
Green	Lydia Howitt	369	5.78
Majority		1,772	27.75
Turnout		6,385	69.20

St Andrews 7 June 2001 East Herts District
Party	Candidate	Votes	%
Conservative	Peter Ruffles	2,961	49.18
Labour	John Courtneidge	2,176	36.14
Liberal Democrats	Jack Coote	884	14.68
Majority		785	13.04
Turnout		6,021	63.80

Sawbridgeworth 7 June 2001 East Herts District
Party	Candidate	Votes	%
Conservative	Anthony Dodd	3,467	52.66
Labour	Linda Harvey	1,651	25.07
Liberal Democrats	David Davies	1,466	22.27
Majority		1,816	27.59
Turnout		6,584	63.60

Ware North 7 June 2001 East Herts District
Party	Candidate	Votes	%
Conservative	David Beatty	2,756	44.78
Labour	Alexander Young	1,693	27.51
Liberal Democrats	Victoria Shaw	1,429	23.22
Green	Robert Street	276	4.49
Majority		1,063	17.27
Turnout		6,154	63.20

Ware South 7 June 2001 East Herts District
Party	Candidate	Votes	%
Conservative	Richard Copping	3,046	50.56
Labour	Neal Underwood	1,775	29.46
Liberal Democrats	Timothy Hoof	1,204	19.98
Majority		1,271	21.10
Turnout		6,025	62.90

=== Hertsmere (7 seats) ===
Borehamwood North 7 June 2001 Hertsmere District
Party	Candidate	Votes	%
Labour	John Metcalf	3,167	55.25
Conservative	Simon Rubner	1,838	32.07
Liberal Democrats	Charles Gunner	727	12.68
Majority		1,329	23.18
Turnout		5,732	53.20

Borehamwood South 7 June 2001 Hertsmere District
Party	Candidate	Votes	%
Labour	Brian York	2,590	49.66
Conservative	John Donne	1,815	34.80
Liberal Democrats	Alec Goodhand	620	11.89
Independent	Peter Hedges	190	3.65
Majority		775	24.86
Turnout		5,215	54.00

Bushey North 7 June 2001 Hertsmere District
Party	Candidate	Votes	%
Liberal Democrats	Michael Colne	2,585	47.30
Conservative	David Bertin	1,850	33.85
Labour	Sandra Mercado	1,030	18.85
Majority		735	13.45
Turnout		5,465	61.50

Bushey South 7 June 2001 Hertsmere District
Party	Candidate	Votes	%
Conservative	Seamus Quilty	2,999	49.84
Liberal Democrats	Marilyn Colne	2,010	33.41
Labour	Dinah Hoeksma	1,008	16.75
Majority		989	16.43
Turnout		6,017	62.50

Potters Bar East 7 June 2001 Hertsmere District
Party	Candidate	Votes	%
Conservative	Alexandra Gray	3,722	54.16
Labour	James Fisher	1,970	28.67
Liberal Democrats	Colin Dean	1,180	17.17
Majority		1,752	25.49
Turnout		6,872	61.00

Potters Bar West & Shenley 7 June 2001 Hertsmere District
Party	Candidate	Votes	%
Conservative	John Usher	2,630	48.97
Labour	Ann Harrison	1,794	33.41
Liberal Democrats	Sean Bishop	946	17.62
Majority		836	15.56
Turnout		5,370	61.40

Watling 7 June 2001 Hertsmere District
Party	Candidate	Votes	%
Conservative	Hugh Saunders	4,053	60.97
Labour	Len Silverstone	1,555	23.39
Liberal Democrats	John Gunner	1,040	15.64
Majority		2,498	37.58
Turnout		6,648	63.00

=== North Herts (9 seats) ===
Hitchin North 1 June 2001 North Herts District
Party	Candidate	Votes	%
Labour	David Billing	3,375	50.08
Conservative	Patricia Cherry	2,115	31.39
Liberal Democrats	David Shirley	935	13.88
Green	Nigel Howitt	313	4.65
Majority		1,260	18.69
Turnout		6,738	63.00

Hitchin Rural 7 June 2001 North Herts District
Party	Candidate	Votes	%
Conservative	Nigel Brook	2,637	45.07
Labour	Roger Wood	2,362	40.38
Liberal Democrats	Michael Lott	851	14.55
Majority		275	4.69
Turnout		5,580	65.90

Hitchin South 7 June 2001 North Herts District
Party	Candidate	Votes	%
Conservative	Derrick Ashley	3,259	49.41
Liberal Democrats	Lawrence Oliver	1,803	27.33
Labour	Jean Twose	1,534	23.26
Majority		1,456	22.08
Turnout		6,596	70.40

Knebworth & Codicote 7 June 2001 North Herts District
Party	Candidate	Votes	%
Conservative	Robert Ellis	3,990	55.32
Labour	Timothy Liddy	1,857	25.75
Liberal Democrats	Richard Stanley	1,060	14.70
Green	Stuart Madgin	305	4.23
Majority		2,133	29.57
Turnout		7,212	68.20

Letchworth East & Baldock 7 June 2001 North Herts District
Party	Candidate	Votes	%
Labour	Lorna Kercher	2,862	43.27
Conservative	Bernard Crow	2,651	40.07
Liberal Democrats	Martin Gammill	1,102	16.66
Majority		211	3.20
Turnout		6,615	60.00

Letchworth North West 7 June 2001 North Herts District
Party	Candidate	Votes	%
Labour	Nigel Agar	3,027	55.36
Conservative	Jessica Cook	1,530	27.98
Liberal Democrats	Nicholas Butcher	911	16.66
Majority		1,497	27.38
Turnout		5,468	60.00

Letchworth South 7 June 2001 North Herts District
Party	Candidate	Votes	%
Conservative	Keith Emsall	2,703	38.07
Liberal Democrats	John Winder	2,320	32.67
Labour	Jacqueline Hartley	2,078	29.26
Majority		383	5.40
Turnout		7,101	66.30

North Herts Rural 7 June 2001 North Herts District
Party	Candidate	Votes	%
Liberal Democrats	Ian Simpson	2,698	45.66
Conservative	Allison Ashley	2,443	41.34
Labour	Kenneth Garland	768	13.00
Majority		255	4.32
Turnout		5,909	71.10

Royston 7 June 2001 North Herts District
Party	Candidate	Votes	%
Conservative	Doug Drake	3,002	42.58
Labour	Robin King	2,208	31.32
Liberal Democrats	Caroline Coates	1,840	26.10
Majority		794	11.26
Turnout		7,050	63.40

=== St Albans (10 seats) ===
Harpenden North East 7 June 2001 St Albans District
Party	Candidate	Votes	%
Conservative	David Lloyd	3,174	45.89
Liberal Democrats	David Waddilove	2,423	35.03
Labour	Linda Spiri	1,320	19.08
Majority		751	10.86
Turnout		6,917	66.90

Harpenden South West 7 June 2001 St Albans District
Party	Candidate	Votes	%
Conservative	Iris Tarry	4,110	56.49
Liberal Democrats	Paul Spinks	1,871	25.71
Labour	Melvin Cato	1,295	17.80
Majority		2,239	30.78
Turnout		7,276	68.00

St Albans Central 7 June 2001 St Albans District
Party	Candidate	Votes	%
Liberal Democrats	Christopher White	2,715	42.88
Labour	David Byatt	2,021	31.92
Conservative	James Vessey	1,488	23.50
NCDMV!	Rosemary Flanagan	107	1.70
Majority		694	10.96
Turnout		6,331	64.90

St Albans East 7 June 2001 St Albans District
Party	Candidate	Votes	%
Labour	Jill Gipps	2,539	39.05
Liberal Democrats	Sheila Burton	2,347	36.10
Conservative	Diana Hall	1,454	22.37
Socialist Alliance	Alan Hooper	96	1.48
NCDMV!	Margaret Payne	65	1.00
Majority		192	2.95
Turnout		6,501	66.00

St Albans North 7 June 2001 St Albans District
Party	Candidate	Votes	%
Labour	Roma Mills	1,445	41.35
Liberal Democrats	Michael Ketley	1,113	31.85
Conservative	Brian Chapman	912	26.09
NCDMV!	Paul Mann	25	0.71
Majority		332	9.50
Turnout		3,495	

St Albans Rural 7 June 2001 St Albans District
Party	Candidate	Votes	%
Conservative	Derek Hills	2,722	43.32
Liberal Democrats	Christopher Oxley	2,528	40.23
Labour	Andrew Viner	1,034	16.45
Majority		194	3.09
Turnout		6,284	68.10

St Albans South 7 June 2001 St Albans District
Party	Candidate	Votes	%
Labour	David McManus	2,488	36.77
Conservative	Rodney Moss	2,201	32.53
Liberal Democrats	Martin Frearson	1,903	28.13
NCDMV!	Peter Goodall	174	2.57
Majority		287	4.24
Turnout		6,766	66.90

St Stephen's 7 June 2001 St Albans District
Party	Candidate	Votes	%
Liberal Democrats	Aislinn Lee	2,996	43.13
Conservative	Gordon Myland	2,590	37.29
Labour	Janet Blackwell	1,360	19.58
Majority		406	5.84
Turnout		6,946	67.60

Sandridge 7 June 2001 St Albans District
Party	Candidate	Votes	%
Liberal Democrats	Geoffrey Churchard	2,599	44.07
Conservative	Beric Read	2,062	34.96
Labour	John Baughan	1,237	20.97
Majority		537	9.11
Turnout		5,898	69.30

The Colneys 7 June 2001 St Albans District
Party	Candidate	Votes	%
Labour	Rosemary Sanderson	2,705	45.50
Conservative	Michael Pugh	2,026	34.08
Liberal Democrats	Robert Prowse	1,214	20.42
Majority		679	11.42
Turnout		5,945	61.50

=== Stevenage (6 seats) ===
Bedwell 7 June 2001 Stevenage District
Party	Candidate	Votes	%
Labour	Tanis Kent	3,327	61.48
Conservative	Louisa Notley	1,221	22.57
Liberal Democrats	George Robbins	863	15.95
Majority		2,106	38.91
Turnout		5,411	57.20

Broadwater 7 June 2001 Stevenage District
Party	Candidate	Votes	%
Labour	Patricia Webb	2,884	54.13
Conservative	Anita Speight	1,524	28.60
Liberal Democrats	Peter Wilkins	920	17.27
Majority		1,360	25.53
Turnout		5,328	58.50

Chells 7 June 2001 Stevenage District
Party	Candidate	Votes	%
Labour	Sherma Batson	2,577	44.54
Liberal Democrats	Elisabeth Knight	1,866	32.25
Conservative	Susan Smith	1,343	23.21
Majority		711	12.29
Turnout		5,786	60.60

Old Stevenage 7 June 2001 Stevenage District
Party	Candidate	Votes	%
Labour	Michael Downing	3,310	47.60
Conservative	Dilys Clark	2,313	33.26
Liberal Democrats	Jennifer Moorcroft	1,004	14.44
Green	Edward Chapman	327	4.70
Majority		997	14.34
Turnout		6,954	60.10

St Nicholas 7 June 2001 Stevenage District
Party	Candidate	Votes	%
Labour	John Smith	3,136	52.76
Conservative	Matthew Hurst	1,637	27.54
Liberal Democrats	Leonard Lambert	907	15.26
Green	Ian Murrill	264	4.44
Majority		1,499	25.22
Turnout		5,944	54.40

Shephall 7 June 2001 Stevenage District
Party	Candidate	Votes	%
Labour	David Royall	3,081	58.79
Conservative	Sheila Woods	1,282	24.46
Liberal Democrats	Nicholas Baskerville	747	14.25
Socialist	Mark Pickersgill	131	2.50
Majority		1,799	34.33
Turnout		5,241	56.50

=== Three Rivers (6 seats) ===
Abbots Langley 7 June 2001 Three Rivers District
Party	Candidate	Votes	%
Liberal Democrats	Paul Goggins	3,500	46.38
Conservative	Richard Simons	2,127	28.19
Labour	Derek Peters	1,919	25.43
Majority		1,373	18.19
Turnout		7,546	65.80

Chorleywood 7 June 2001 Three Rivers District
Party	Candidate	Votes	%
Liberal Democrats	Eleanor Clarke	3,012	45.59
Conservative	Gerald Pulman	2,976	45.05
Labour	Kerron Cross	618	9.36
Majority		36	0.54
Turnout		6,606	72.80

Croxley 7 June 2001 Three Rivers District
Party	Candidate	Votes	%
Liberal Democrats	Thomas Ambrose	3,265	52.88
Conservative	Graham Denman	1,778	28.80
Labour	Leonard Tippen	1,131	18.32
Majority		1,487	24.08
Turnout		6,174	68.70

Oxhey Park 7 June 2001 Three Rivers District
Party	Candidate	Votes	%
Conservative	Roy Clements	3,465	52.80
Labour	David Lake	1,633	24.89
Liberal Democrats	Pauline Purdy	1,464	22.31
Majority		1,832	27.91
Turnout		6,562	65.80

Rickmansworth 7 June 2001 Three Rivers District
Party	Candidate	Votes	%
Conservative	Barbara Lamb	3,580	47.54
Liberal Democrats	Richard Struck	2,400	31.87
Labour	David Warburton	1,551	20.59
Majority		1,180	15.67
Turnout		7,531	65.50

South Oxhey 7 June 2001 Three Rivers District
Party	Candidate	Votes	%
Labour	Jane Hobday	2,110	53.08
Conservative	Fiona Denman	951	23.93
Liberal Democrats	Raymond Tully	914	22.99
Majority		1,159	29.15
Turnout		3,975	51.60

=== Watford (6 seats) ===
Callowland Leggatts 7 June 2001 Watford District
Party	Candidate	Votes	%
Labour	Keith Crout	2,926	51.22
Conservative	Stephen O'Brien	1,561	27.32
Liberal Democrats	Christopher Leslie	940	16.45
Green	Tessa Lowe	286	5.01
Majority		1,365	23.90
Turnout		5,713	56.70

Central Oxhey 7 June 2001 Watford District
Party	Candidate	Votes	%
Liberal Democrats	Stephen Giles - Medhurst	2,614	45.26
Labour	Nnagbogu Akubue	1,740	30.12
Conservative	Geoffrey Greenstreet	1,164	20.15
Green	Andrew McBean	258	4.47
Majority		874	15.14
Turnout		5,776	59.10

Meriden Tudor 7 June 2001 Watford District
Party	Candidate	Votes	%
Labour	Vincent Muspratt	2,692	44.13
Conservative	Pamela Bell	1,999	32.77
Liberal Democrats	Timothy Wyatt	968	15.87
Independent	Graham Burrow	245	4.02
Green	Stephen Rackett	196	3.21
Majority		693	11.36
Turnout		6,100	62.20

Nascot Park 7 June 2001 Watford District
Party	Candidate	Votes	%
Conservative	Robert Gordon	3,190	46.90
Labour	Marion Chambers	1,749	25.72
Liberal Democrats	Jonathan Wyatt	1,556	22.88
Green	Denise Kingsley	306	4.50
Majority		1,441	21.18
Turnout		6,801	67.70

Vicarage Hollywell 7 June 2001 Watford District
Party	Candidate	Votes	%
Labour	Maria Green	2,978	51.46
Liberal Democrats	Shanaz Ali	1,483	25.63
Conservative	Paul Jenkins	1,070	18.49
Green	Nicholas Acton	256	4.42
Majority		1,495	25.83
Turnout		5,787	56.30

Woodside Stanborough 7 June 2001 Watford District
Party	Candidate	Votes	%
Liberal Democrats	Derek Scudder	2,325	39.02
Labour	Steven Palmer	2,065	34.65
Conservative	Roger Frost	1,437	24.11
Green	Ramiro Alvardo-Vega	132	2.22
Majority		260	4.37
Turnout		5,959	59.20

=== Welwyn Hatfield (7 seats) ===
Haldens 7 June 2001 Welwyn Hatfield District
Party	Candidate	Votes	%
Labour	Robert Mays	3,052	47.96
Conservative	John Mansfield	2,157	33.89
Liberal Democrats	Richard Griffiths	1,155	18.15
Majority		895	14.07
Turnout		6,364	63.20

Handside & Peartree 7 June 2001 Welwyn Hatfield District
Party	Candidate	Votes	%
Labour	Mike Hobday	2,569	42.45
Conservative	Carl Storer	2,244	37.08
Liberal Democrats	Marietta Lotz	1,239	20.47
Majority		325	5.37
Turnout		6,052	63.10

Hatfield North 7 June 2001 Welwyn Hatfield District
Party	Candidate	Votes	%
Labour	Frank Clayton	3,385	46.23
Conservative	Irene Dean	2,591	35.38
Liberal Democrats	Hazel Laming	1,347	18.39
Majority		794	10.85
Turnout		7,323	60.10

Hatfield Rural 7 June 2001 Welwyn Hatfield District
Party	Candidate	Votes	%
Conservative	William Storey	4,254	67.32
Labour	Melvyn Jones	883	13.97
Liberal Democrats	Nigel Bain	810	12.82
Green	Kevin Pressland	372	5.89
Majority		3,371	53.35
Turnout		6,319	68.10

Hatfield South 7 June 2001 Welwyn Hatfield District
Party	Candidate	Votes	%
Labour	George Wenham	2,663	45.08
Conservative	John Scarff	2,205	37.33
Liberal Democrats	Simon Archer	1,039	17.59
Majority		458	7.75
Turnout		5,907	58.70

Welwyn 7 June 2001 Welwyn Hatfield District
Party	Candidate	Votes	%
Conservative	Richard Smith	4,272	52.05
Labour	Jan Burnell	2,450	29.85
Liberal Democrats	Ian Skidmore	1,486	18.10
Majority		1,822	22.20
Turnout		8,208	71.40

Welwyn Garden City South 7 June 2001 Welwyn Hatfield District
Party	Candidate	Votes	%
Labour	Susan Jones	2,926	53.60
Conservative	Robert Davidson	1,668	30.55
Liberal Democrats	Maurice Richardson	865	15.85
Majority		1,258	23.05
Turnout		5,459	62.70
