= David Lloyd (police commissioner) =

Police and Crime Commissioner for Hertfordshire (2012–24)

David Lloyd OBE
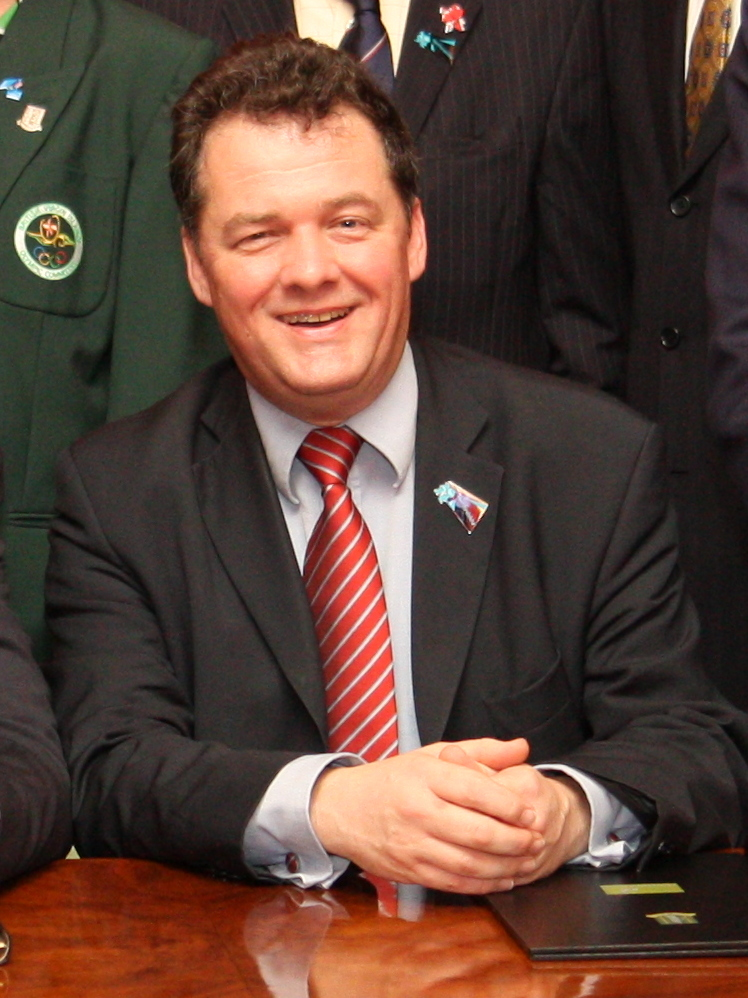
- Lloyd in 2012

Hertfordshire Police and Crime Commissioner
- In office 22 November 2012 – 8 May 2024
- Preceded by: Office Created
- Succeeded by: Jonathan Ash-Edwards

Hertfordshire County Councillor for Bridgewater
- In office 9 May 2005 – 4 May 2017
- Preceded by: Julian Taunton
- Succeeded by: Terry Douris

Hertfordshire County Councillor for Hemel Hempstead Town
- In office 7 June 2001 – 9 May 2005
- Preceded by: Jennifer Beesley
- Succeeded by: Stephen Holmes

Personal details
- Born: December 1963 (age 62) Bristol, England
- Party: Conservative

David Edward Lloyd (born December 1963) is a British Conservative Party politician and financial adviser. He served as the Hertfordshire Police and Crime Commissioner between 2012 and 2024. He was a member of Milton Keynes Council in the 1990s and was a member of Hertfordshire County Council from 2001 to 2017.

== Early life ==
Lloyd was born in Bristol, England, and educated in Berkshire. He studied French at the University of Birmingham and at the University of Lyon.

== Career ==
=== Business career ===
Following university, Lloyd spent ten years working in banking. Since then, he has worked as a financial adviser.

=== Political career ===
Lloyd was a local councillor. From 1992 to 1996, he was a member of Milton Keynes Council. On 7 June 2001, he was elected as a member of Hertfordshire County Council. Before being elected as PCC, he served as deputy leader of the county council. He also served as Chairman of the Hertfordshire Police Authority.

On 15 November 2012, Lloyd was elected the Hertfordshire Police and Crime Commissioner (PCC) for Hertfordshire Constabulary. He is the first person to hold this appointment; the PCCs were created to replace the now-abolished police authorities. In 2024 it was announced he would not be standing for the role again.
