= Hertfordshire Police and Crime Commissioner =

Elected police commissioner for the county of Hertfordshire, England

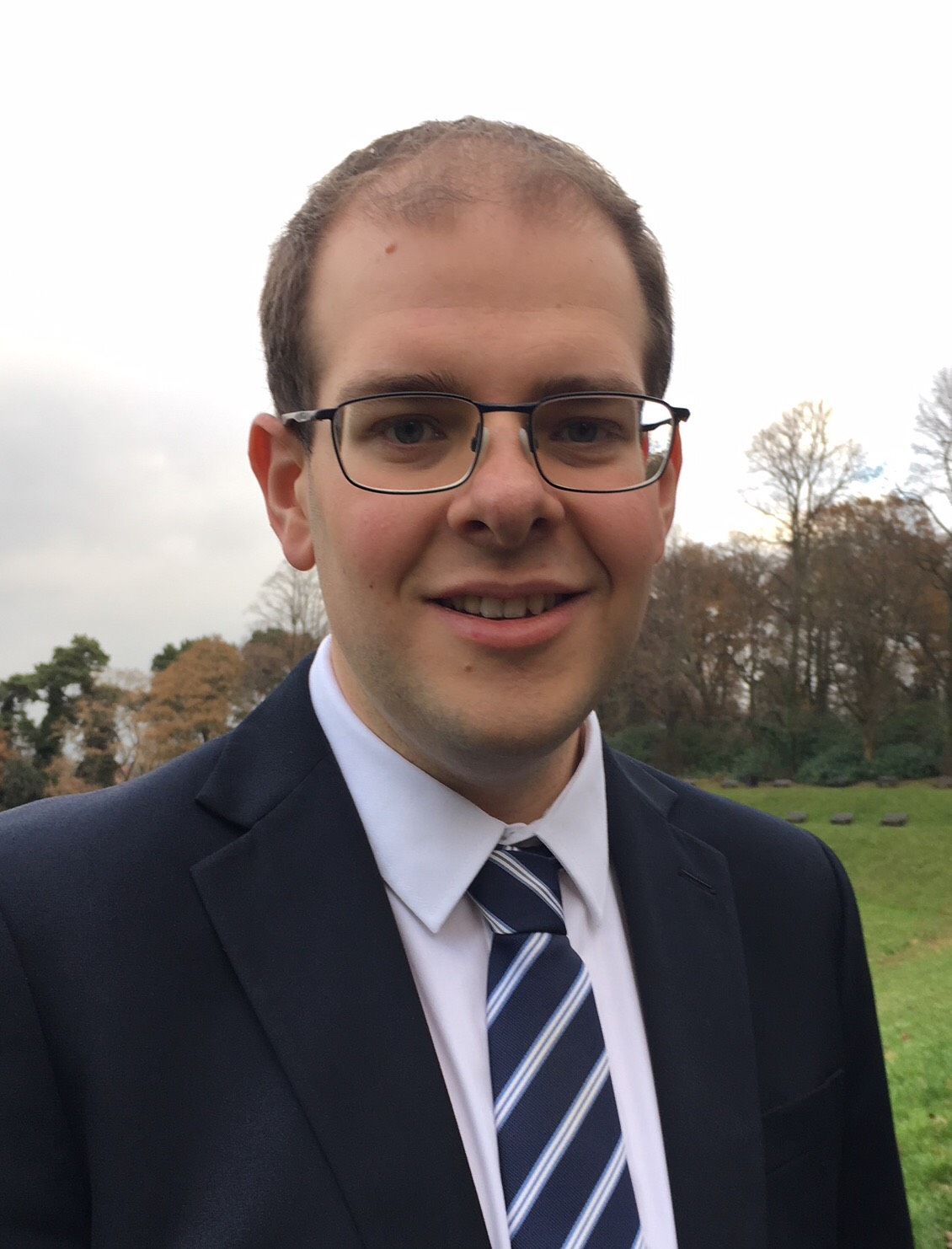
- Incumbent; Jonathan Ash-Edwards since 9 May 2024
- Police and crime commissioner of Hertfordshire Police
- Reports to: Hertfordshire Police and Crime Panel
- Appointer: Electorate of Hertfordshire
- Term length: Four years
- Constituting instrument: Police Reform and Social Responsibility Act 2011
- Precursor: Hertfordshire Police Authority
- Inaugural holder: David Lloyd
- Formation: 22 November 2012
- Deputy: Deputy Police and Crime Commissioner
- Salary: £78,400
- Website: www.hertscommissioner.org

The Hertfordshire Police and Crime Commissioner is the police and crime commissioner, an elected official tasked with setting out the way crime is tackled by Hertfordshire Police in the English County of Hertfordshire. The post was created in November 2012, following an election held on 15 November 2012, and replaced the Hertfordshire Police Authority.

The Commissioner's role is to hold the police and the chief constable to account on behalf of the public, and to set the strategic direction of the force through the Police Crime Plan. The office is based at Harpenden Police Station.

The current incumbent is Jonathan Ash-Edwards, who represents the Conservative Party. He was elected in 2024, and was the second person to hold the role. Previously, it was held by David Lloyd. Lloyd was first elected in 2012 and re-elected to the role at subsequent elections, until in 2024 it was announced Lloyd would not re-contest the role.

== List of Hertfordshire Police and Crime Commissioners ==
Name	Political party	From	To
David Lloyd	Conservative	22 November 2012	8 May 2024
Jonathan Ash-Edwards	Conservative	9 May 2024	Incumbent

== Election results ==
=== 2024 Hertfordshire Police and Crime Commissioner election ===
2024 Hertfordshire Police and Crime Commissioner election
Party	Candidate	Votes	%	±%
Conservative	Jonathan Ash-Edwards	93,658	36.7	
Green	Matt Fisher	26,715	10.5	
Labour	Tom Plater	66,585	26.1	
Liberal Democrats	Sean Prendergast	68,254	26.7	
Turnout				
Total votes		255,221		

=== 2021 Hertfordshire Police and Crime Commissioner election ===
2021 Hertfordshire police and crime commissioner election
Party	Candidate	1st round		2nd round			1st round votesTransfer votes, 2nd round
Party	Candidate	Total	Of round	Transfers	Total	Of round	1st round votesTransfer votes, 2nd round
Conservative	David Lloyd*	155,144	48.54%	12,761	167,905	55.30%	
Liberal Democrats	Sam North	87,524	27.38%	48,172	135,696	44.70%	
Labour Co-op	Philip Ross	76,941	24.07%				
Turnout		319,609					
Conservative hold							

=== 2016 Hertfordshire Police and Crime Commissioner election ===
Hertfordshire Police and Crime Commissioner election, 2016
Party	Candidate	1st round		2nd round			1st round votesTransfer votes, 2nd round
Party	Candidate	Total	Of round	Transfers	Total	Of round	1st round votesTransfer votes, 2nd round
Conservative	David Lloyd	100,262	42.3%	25,807	126,069	59.5%	
Labour	Kerry Pollard	64,978	27.4%	20,876	85,854	40.5%	
Liberal Democrats	Chris White	38,488	16.2%				
UKIP	Mark Hughes	33,575	14.2%				
Turnout		237,303	28.1%				
Rejected ballots							
Total votes							
Registered electors							
Conservative hold							

=== 2012 Hertfordshire Police and Crime Commissioner election ===
Hertfordshire Police and Crime Commissioner election, 2012
Party	Candidate	1st round		2nd round			1st round votesTransfer votes, 2nd round
Party	Candidate	Total	Of round	Transfers	Total	Of round	1st round votesTransfer votes, 2nd round
Conservative	David Lloyd	54,686	45.89%	10,899	65,585	60.5%	
Labour	Sherma Batson	34,528	28.98%	8,302	42,830	39.5%	
Liberal Democrats	Christopher Townsend	16,790	14.09%				
UKIP	Marion Mason	13,154	11.04%				
Turnout		119,158	14.10%				
Rejected ballots		3,797	3.09%				
Total votes		122,955	14.55				
Registered electors		845,253					
Conservative win							
