= 2023 Mid Sussex District Council election =

2023 UK local government election

- 4 May 2023

All 48 seats to Mid Sussex District Council 25 seats needed for a majority
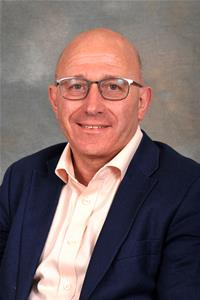

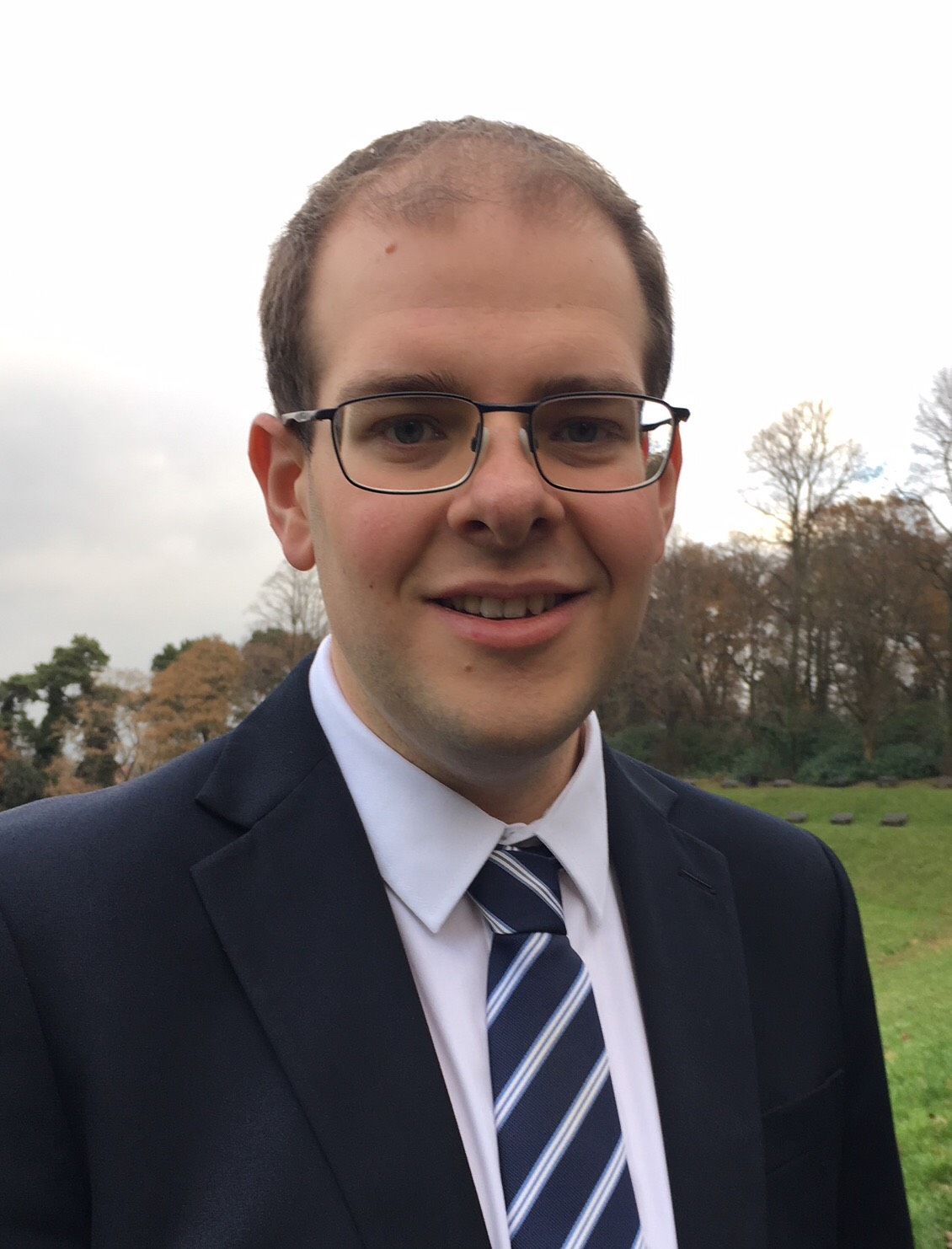
	First party	Second party	Third party
			Ind
Leader	Robert Eggleston	Jonathan Ash-Edwards
Party	Liberal Democrats	Conservative	Independent
Leader's seat	Burgess Hill Meeds & Hammonds	Lindfield (defeated)
Last election	13 seats, 30.2%	34 seats, 40.0%	4 seats, 8.2%
Seats won	20	18	5
Seat change	▲8	▼11	▲1
Popular vote	28,248	25,143	7,940
Percentage	36.9%	32.9%	10.4%
Swing	▲6.7%	▼7.1%	▲2.2%
	Fourth party	Fifth party
Party	Green	Labour
Last election	3 seats, 11.4%	0 seats, 9.1%
Seats won	4	1
Seat change	▲1	▲1
Popular vote	9,172	5,870
Percentage	12.0%	7.7%
Swing	▲0.6%	▼1.4%
- Winner of each seat at the 2023 Mid Sussex District Council election.
Leader before election
Conservative
Leader after election
No overall control

The 2023 Mid Sussex District Council election took place on 4 May 2023 to elect members of Mid Sussex District Council in West Sussex, England. This was on the same day as other local elections in England.

New ward boundaries were drawn up for this election, with the number of seats on the council reducing from 54 to 48.

== Summary ==
Prior to the election the council was under Conservative majority control. Following the election the council was left under no overall control with the Liberal Democrats being the largest party; the Conservative leader of the council, Jonathan Ash-Edwards, lost his seat. Following the election a minority administration of the Liberal Democrats and four of the five independent councillors took control of the council, with Liberal Democrat councillor Robert Eggleston being appointed leader of the council at the subsequent annual council meeting on 23 May 2023.

== Overall result ==
The overall results were as follows:

2023 Mid Sussex District Council election
Party	Candidates	Seats	Gains	Losses	Net gain/loss	Seats %	Votes %	Votes	+/−
Liberal Democrats	39	20	8	0	▲8	41.7	36.9	28,248	+6.7
Conservative	48	18	0	11	▼11	37.5	32.9	25,143	–7.1
Independent	20	5	1	0	▲1	10.4	10.4	7,940	+2.2
Green	24	4	1	0	▲1	8.3	12.0	9,172	+0.6
Labour	19	1	1	0	▲1	2.1	7.7	5,870	–1.4
Monster Raving Loony	1	0	0	0	Steady	0.0	0.2	150	N/A

== Ward results ==
The Statement of Persons Nominated, which details the candidates standing in each ward, was released by Mid Sussex District Council following the close of nominations on 4 April 2023. The results were as follows, with an asterisk (*) indicating an incumbent councillor standing for re-election.

=== Ardingly, Balcombe & Turners Hill ===
Ardingly, Balcombe & Turners Hill (2 seats)
Party	Candidate	Votes	%	±%
Green	Jenny Edwards*	709	40.4	
Conservative	Gary Marsh*	567	32.3	
Green	Matt Brewin	565	32.2	
Conservative	Bruce Forbes	511	29.2	
Independent	Julian Smith	393	22.4	
Liberal Democrats	Ben Jerrit	358	20.4	
Independent	Barry Theobald	243	13.9	
Turnout		1,757	37.8	
Rejected ballots		4		
Registered electors		4,650		
Green win (new seat)				
Conservative win (new seat)				

=== Ashurst Wood & East Grinstead South ===
Ashurst Wood & East Grinstead South
Party	Candidate	Votes	%	±%
Conservative	John Belsey*	535	64.0	
Green	Pete Wells	168	20.1	
Liberal Democrats	Graham Knight	133	15.9	
Majority		367	43.9	
Turnout		844	41.1	
Rejected ballots		7		
Registered electors		2,053		
Conservative win (new seat)				

=== Burgess Hill Dunstall ===
Burgess Hill Dunstall (2 seats)
Party	Candidate	Votes	%	±%
Liberal Democrats	Mike Kennedy	648	41.6	
Conservative	Mustak Miah	622	40.0	
Liberal Democrats	Giles Parsons	553	35.5	
Conservative	Chris Mucklestone	526	33.8	
Independent	Yann Davies	249	16.0	
Labour	Pam Haigh	174	11.2	
Turnout		1,557	38.0	
Rejected ballots		1		
Registered electors		4,100		
Liberal Democrats gain from Conservative				
Conservative hold				

=== Burgess Hill Franklands ===
Burgess Hill Franklands (2 seats)
Party	Candidate	Votes	%	±%
Liberal Democrats	Janice Henwood*	1,130	63.0	
Liberal Democrats	David Eggleton	1,107	61.7	
Conservative	Claire Fussell	404	22.5	
Conservative	Tobias Parker	393	21.9	
Independent	Andy Stowe	328	18.3	
Turnout		1,810	43.0	
Rejected ballots		17		
Registered electors		4,213		
Liberal Democrats hold				
Liberal Democrats hold				

=== Burgess Hill Leylands ===
Burgess Hill Leylands (2 seats)
Party	Candidate	Votes	%	±%
Green	Anne Eves*	848	61.5	
Liberal Democrats	Simon Hicks*	813	59.0	
Conservative	Colin Holden	383	27.8	
Conservative	Adam White	331	24.0	
Turnout		1,396	37.7	
Rejected ballots		17		
Registered electors		3,702		
Green hold				
Liberal Democrats hold				

=== Burgess Hill Meeds & Hammonds ===
Burgess Hill Meeds & Hammonds (2 seats)
Party	Candidate	Votes	%	±%
Liberal Democrats	Robert Eggleston*	1,208	67.0	
Liberal Democrats	Tofojjul Hussain*	1,046	58.0	
Independent	Sean Kelly	402	22.3	
Conservative	Cherry Catharine	334	18.5	
Conservative	Elizabeth White	287	15.9	
Turnout		1,815	38.1	
Rejected ballots		12		
Registered electors		4,770		
Liberal Democrats win (new seat)				
Liberal Democrats win (new seat)				

=== Burgess Hill St Andrews ===
Burgess Hill St Andrews (2 seats)
Party	Candidate	Votes	%	±%
Liberal Democrats	Christine Cherry	800	45.5	
Green	Matthew Cornish*	665	37.8	
Independent	Ray Woods	442	25.1	
Conservative	Jeremy Catharine	368	20.9	
Labour	Joanne Rodway	319	18.1	
Conservative	Toby Dawson	317	18.0	
Labour	Rebecca Sinnatt	212	12.1	
Turnout		1,768	35.0	
Rejected ballots		10		
Registered electors		5,057		
Liberal Democrats hold				
Green hold				

=== Burgess Hill Victoria ===
Burgess Hill Victoria
Party	Candidate	Votes	%	±%
Independent	Peter Chapman*	666	66.7	
Labour	Linda Gregory	201	20.1	
Conservative	Martin Willcock	132	13.2	
Majority		465	46.5	
Turnout		1,013	32.4	
Rejected ballots		14		
Registered electors		3,124		
Independent hold				

=== Copthorne and Worth ===
Copthorne and Worth (2 seats)
Party	Candidate	Votes	%	±%
Conservative	Graham Casella	612	50.9	
Independent	Christopher Phillips*	505	42.0	
Conservative	Tony Dorey	481	40.0	
Liberal Democrats	Maggie Aston	323	26.9	
Green	Lorcan Smith	219	18.2	
Turnout		1,205	28.2	
Rejected ballots		3		
Registered electors		4,276		
Conservative gain from Independent				
Independent hold				

=== Crawley Down ===
Crawley Down (2 seats)
Party	Candidate	Votes	%	±%
Independent	Ian Gibson*	1,080	62.6	
Independent	John Hitchcock	980	56.8	
Conservative	Liz Williams	439	25.5	
Conservative	Phillip Coote*	403	23.4	
Green	Gordon Westcott	188	10.9	
Liberal Democrats	Matthew Goldsmith	159	9.2	
Turnout		1,731	37.2	
Rejected ballots		7		
Registered electors		4,653		
Independent win (new seat)				
Independent win (new seat)				

=== Cuckfield, Bolney & Ansty ===
Cuckfield, Bolney & Ansty (2 seats)
Party	Candidate	Votes	%	±%
Conservative	Malcolm Avery	894	45.3	
Conservative	Jim Knight*	706	35.8	
Liberal Democrats	Barbara King	540	27.4	
Independent	Sacha Dykes	419	21.2	
Liberal Democrats	James Holloway	367	18.6	
Green	Rachel McNamara	360	18.3	
Labour	Andrew Foster	292	14.8	
Monster Raving Loony	Baron Von Thunderclap	150	7.6	
Turnout		1,973	39.4	
Rejected ballots		1		
Registered electors		5,007		
Conservative win (new seat)				
Conservative win (new seat)				

=== Downland Villages ===
Downland Villages
Party	Candidate	Votes	%	±%
Conservative	Geoff Zeidler	511	55.5	
Liberal Democrats	Neville Searle	185	20.1	
Labour	Norina O'Hare	116	12.6	
Green	Clare Rogers	109	11.8	
Majority		326	35.4	
Turnout		929	36.8	
Rejected ballots		8		
Registered electors		2,525		
Conservative win (new seat)				

=== East Grinstead Ashplats ===
East Grinstead Ashplats (2 seats)
Party	Candidate	Votes	%	±%
Conservative	Margaret Belsey*	696	48.6	
Conservative	Adam Peacock*	561	39.2	
Liberal Democrats	Andrew Lane	310	21.6	
Independent	Carly Godfrey	272	19.0	
Green	Alex Langridge	272	19.0	
Labour	Thomas Britton	266	18.6	
Independent	Stef Hillwood	254	17.7	
Turnout		1,439	27.2	
Rejected ballots		7		
Registered electors		5,298		
Conservative hold				
Conservative hold				

=== East Grinstead Baldwins ===
East Grinstead Baldwins
Party	Candidate	Votes	%	±%
Independent	Julie Mockford*	340	38.5	
Conservative	Christopher Evans	292	33.1	
Liberal Democrats	Fathi Tarada	250	28.3	
Majority		48	5.4	
Turnout		889	33.1	
Rejected ballots		7		
Registered electors		2,687		
Independent gain from Conservative				

=== East Grinstead Herontye ===
East Grinstead Herontye
Party	Candidate	Votes	%	±%
Conservative	Dick Sweatman*	429	45.6	
Liberal Democrats	Steve Hall	272	28.9	
Independent	Nick Gibson	126	13.4	
Green	Sharon Martin	113	12.0	
Majority		157	16.7	
Turnout		947	35.0	
Rejected ballots		7		
Registered electors		2,706		
Conservative hold				

=== East Grinstead Imberhorne ===
East Grinstead Imberhorne (2 seats)
Party	Candidate	Votes	%	±%
Conservative	Rex Whittaker*	666	43.2	
Conservative	Lee Farren	530	34.4	
Independent	Heidi Brunsdon*	517	33.5	
Liberal Democrats	Peter Williams	412	26.7	
Green	Chrissie Masters	342	22.2	
Independent	Christopher Lomas	333	21.6	
Turnout		1,565	31.4	
Rejected ballots		23		
Registered electors		4,989		
Conservative hold				
Conservative hold				

=== East Grinstead Town ===
East Grinstead Town (2 seats)
Party	Candidate	Votes	%	±%
Conservative	Jacquie Russell	539	40.0	
Conservative	John Dabell*	504	37.4	
Liberal Democrats	Steve Barnett	498	36.9	
Liberal Democrats	Lee Gibbs	378	28.0	
Green	Laura Buonocore	203	15.0	
Independent	Norman Mockford	199	14.8	
Labour	David Wilbraham	183	13.6	
Turnout		1,356	27.6	
Rejected ballots		7		
Registered electors		4,905		
Conservative hold				
Conservative hold				

=== Handcross & Pease Pottage ===
Handcross & Pease Pottage
Party	Candidate	Votes	%	±%
Conservative	Eric Prescott	270	44.0	
Liberal Democrats	Peter Cox	199	32.4	
Independent	Carole Steggles	145	23.6	
Majority		71	11.6	
Turnout		621	23.4	
Rejected ballots		7		
Registered electors		2,655		
Conservative win (new seat)				

=== Hassocks ===
Hassocks (3 seats)
Party	Candidate	Votes	%	±%
Liberal Democrats	Sue Hatton*	2,314	75.2	
Liberal Democrats	Kristian Berggreen	2,084	67.7	
Liberal Democrats	Christopher Hobbs	1,699	55.2	
Conservative	Alex Simmons	587	19.1	
Labour	Alison Whelan	564	18.3	
Green	Marie Holmstrom	541	17.6	
Conservative	Philip Beck	474	15.4	
Conservative	Stephen Horsfield	423	13.7	
Turnout		3,092	46.0	
Rejected ballots		15		
Registered electors		6,727		
Liberal Democrats hold				
Liberal Democrats hold				
Liberal Democrats hold				

=== Haywards Heath Ashenground ===
Haywards Heath Ashenground (2 seats)
Party	Candidate	Votes	%	±%
Liberal Democrats	Richard Bates*	873	48.5	
Liberal Democrats	Duncan Pascoe	708	39.4	
Conservative	Sujan Wickremaratchi	532	29.6	
Conservative	Justin Cromie	467	26.0	
Labour	Murray Crump	370	20.6	
Green	Richard Kail	328	18.2	
Turnout		1,803	33.2	
Rejected ballots		4		
Registered electors		5,424		
Liberal Democrats hold				
Liberal Democrats gain from Conservative				

=== Haywards Heath Bentswood & Heath ===
Haywards Heath Bentswood & Heath (2 seats)
Party	Candidate	Votes	%	±%
Liberal Democrats	Alison Rees	751	45.5	
Liberal Democrats	Anthony Platts	700	42.4	
Conservative	Rachel Cromie*	560	33.9	
Conservative	Stephen Hillier*	552	33.4	
Labour	Jack Taplin	369	22.4	
Green	Deanna Nicholson	311	18.8	
Labour	Benjamin Webb	251	15.2	
Turnout		1,672	29.6	
Rejected ballots		21		
Registered electors		5,644		
Liberal Democrats win (new seat)				
Liberal Democrats win (new seat)				

=== Haywards Heath Franklands ===
Haywards Heath Franklands (2 seats)
Party	Candidate	Votes	%	±%
Conservative	Rod Clarke*	620	32.9	
Labour	Paul Kenny	594	31.5	
Labour	Tim Weekes	562	29.8	
Conservative	Mike Pulfer*	536	28.4	
Liberal Democrats	Anne-Marie Lucraft	359	19.0	
Liberal Democrats	Susan Knight	293	15.5	
Green	Caroline Mendes	192	10.2	
Turnout		1,898	41.2	
Rejected ballots		13		
Registered electors		4,608		
Conservative hold				
Labour gain from Conservative				

=== Haywards Heath Lucastes & Bolnore ===
Haywards Heath Lucastes & Bolnore (2 seats)
Party	Candidate	Votes	%	±%
Liberal Democrats	Paul Lucraft	715	39.1	
Liberal Democrats	Abdul Bashar	710	38.8	
Conservative	Ruth De Mierre*	704	38.5	
Conservative	Alastair McPherson	697	38.1	
Green	Allan Murray	375	20.5	
Labour	Nick Lashmar	372	20.4	
Turnout		1,855	35.4	
Rejected ballots		27		
Registered electors		5,241		
Liberal Democrats win (new seat)				
Liberal Democrats win (new seat)				

=== Haywards Heath North ===
Haywards Heath North
Party	Candidate	Votes	%	±%
Conservative	Sandy Ellis*	400	35.7	
Liberal Democrats	Emiliano Mancino	339	30.2	
Green	Richard Nicholson	168	15.0	
Labour	David Morley	167	14.9	
Independent	Christian Pitt	47	4.2	
Majority		61	5.4	
Turnout		1,132	40.6	
Rejected ballots		12		
Registered electors		2,791		
Conservative win (new seat)				

=== Hurstpierpoint ===
Hurstpierpoint (2 seats)
Party	Candidate	Votes	%	±%
Liberal Democrats	Alison Bennett*	1,236	62.2	
Liberal Democrats	Rodney Jackson*	1,050	52.8	
Conservative	Mark Scholfield	471	23.7	
Conservative	Billy Lee	444	22.3	
Labour	Graciano Soares	328	16.5	
Green	Sue Kelly	315	15.8	
Turnout		2,000	41.1	
Rejected ballots		12		
Registered electors		4,869		
Liberal Democrats win (new seat)				
Liberal Democrats win (new seat)				

=== Lindfield ===
Lindfield (2 seats)
Party	Candidate	Votes	%	±%
Liberal Democrats	Anne-Marie Cooke	1,141	44.5	
Liberal Democrats	Cavan Wood	1,020	39.8	
Conservative	Jonathan Ash-Edwards*	906	35.3	
Conservative	Anthea Lea*	855	33.3	
Green	David Woolley	450	17.5	
Green	Stu Nisbett	360	14.0	
Labour	Iain Maclean	225	8.8	
Turnout		2,584	48.5	
Rejected ballots		19		
Registered electors		5,329		
Liberal Democrats gain from Conservative				
Liberal Democrats gain from Conservative				

=== Lindfield Rural & High Weald ===
Lindfield Rural & High Weald (2 seats)
Party	Candidate	Votes	%	±%
Green	Paul Brown*	852	40.1	
Conservative	Lorraine Carvalho	851	40.1	
Conservative	Sarah Webster	821	38.7	
Liberal Democrats	Emily Lomax	567	26.7	
Green	Nigel Cross	519	24.4	
Labour	Mandy Claiden	305	14.4	
Turnout		2,133	39.8	
Rejected ballots		9		
Registered electors		5,363		
Green win (new seat)				
Conservative win (new seat)				

== Changes 2023–2027 ==
- November 2025: Janice Henwood (Burgess Hill Franklands) left the Liberal Democrats to sit as an independent, reducing the party to 19 of the council's 48 seats, one more than the Conservatives' 18.

=== By-elections ===
==== Hurstpierpoint ====
The by-election was triggered by the resignation of Liberal Democrat councillor Alison Bennett.

Hurstpierpoint by-election, 7 May 2026
Party	Candidate	Votes	%	±%
Liberal Democrats	Lyn Williams	1,211	48.7	
Conservative	Eliza-Jane Brazil	544	21.9	
Reform	Thomas Givons	414	16.6	
Green	James Stringfellow	319	12.8	
Majority		667	26.8	
Turnout		2,501	50.47	+9.4
Rejected ballots		13		
Registered electors		4,955		
Liberal Democrats hold		Swing		

==== Haywards Heath Bentswood & Heath ====
Haywards Heath Bentswood & Heath by-election, 10 December 2026
Party	Candidate	Votes	%	±%
Liberal Democrats	Mohtasem Billah			
Conservative	Ruth de Mierre			
Green	Wilf Shorrock			
Restore	Jason Taylor			
Reform	Paul Vallis			
Majority				
Turnout				
		Swing		
