= Mid Sussex District =

Coordinates: 51°1′14.4″N 0°8′14.38″W

- Non-metropolitan district
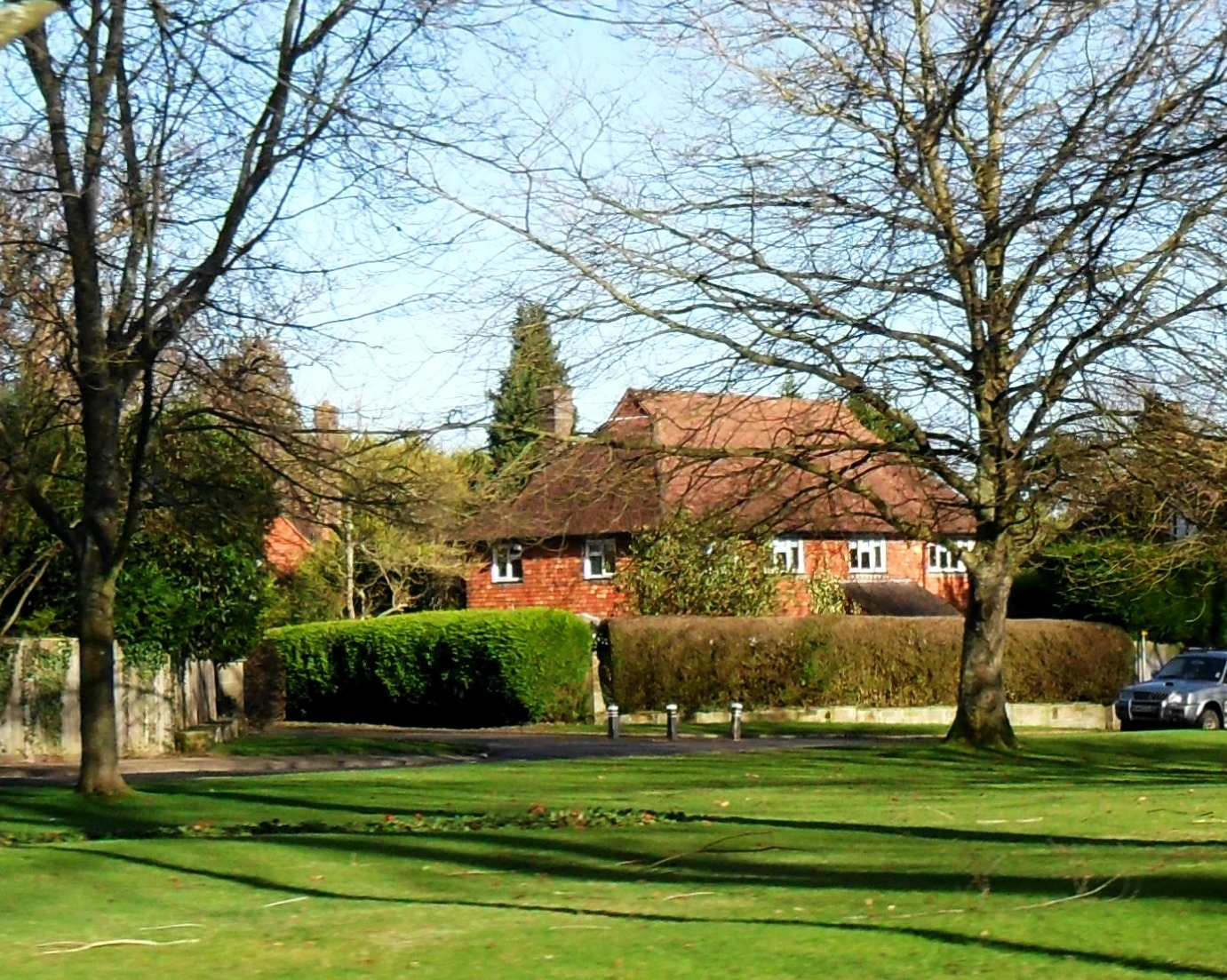
- Muster Green at Haywards Heath, the district's largest town.

- Mid Sussex shown within West Sussex
- Sovereign state: United Kingdom
- Constituent country: England
- Region: South East England
- Non-metropolitan county: West Sussex
- Status: Non-metropolitan district
- Admin HQ: Haywards Heath
- Incorporated: 1 April 1974

Government
  - Type: Non-metropolitan district council
  - Body: Mid Sussex District Council
  - MPs: Andrew Griffith; John Milne (British politician); Alison Bennett

Area
  - Total: 128.97 sq mi (334.02 km^{2})
  - Rank: 111th (of 296)

Population (2025)
  - Total: 163,566
  - Rank: 134th (of 296)
  - Density: 1,268.3/sq mi (489.69/km^{2})

Ethnicity (2021)
  - Ethnic groups: List: 92.2% White; 3.6% Asian; 2.5% Mixed; 0.9% Black; 0.8% other

Religion (2021)
  - Religion: List: 47.9% Christianity; 42.1% no religion; 6.3% not stated; 1.2% Islam; 1% Hinduism; 0.7% other; 0.4% Buddhism; 0.2% Judaism; 0.1% Sikhism
- Time zone: UTC0 (GMT)
  - Summer (DST): UTC+1 (BST)

Mid Sussex is a local government district in West Sussex, England. The largest town is Haywards Heath, where the council is based. The district also contains the towns of Burgess Hill and East Grinstead plus surrounding rural areas, including many villages. The district includes part of the South Downs National Park and part of the designated Area of Outstanding Natural Beauty of High Weald, including sections of Ashdown Forest. The district contains most headwaters of the River Ouse. Its largest body of water is Ardingly reservoir which is used by watersports clubs. At the 2021 census the district had a population of 152,949.

The neighbouring districts are Crawley, Horsham, Brighton and Hove, Lewes, Wealden and Tandridge.

== History ==
The name "Mid Sussex" was occasionally used for various parts of central Sussex prior to 1974, including as an alternative name for the Lewes constituency created under the Redistribution of Seats Act 1885, and as a joint water district established in 1907.

The modern district was formed on 1 April 1974 under the Local Government Act 1972 as one of seven districts within West Sussex. The new district covered the whole area of three former districts and most of a fourth, which were all abolished at the same time:

- Burgess Hill Urban District
- Cuckfield Urban District (included Haywards Heath and Lindfield)
- Cuckfield Rural District (except the parts of the parishes of Slaugham and Worth within the designated area for the new town of Crawley)
- East Grinstead Urban District

The new district was named Mid Sussex, reflecting its position within the historic county. All of the areas which made up Mid Sussex were in East Sussex prior to 1974; as part of the reforms that year they were transferred to West Sussex. The change of county was not without controversy; the government's rationale for the change was that it brought the projected major economic area centred on Crawley and Gatwick Airport under the supervision of one county council.

== Governance ==
Mid Sussex District Council

Type
- Type: Non-metropolitan district

Leadership
- Chair: Mike Kennedy, Liberal Democrat since 14 May 2025
- Leader: Robert Eggleston, Liberal Democrat since 24 May 2023
- Chief Executive: Kathryn Hall since 2010

Structure
- Seats: 48 councillors
- Graph of the party split among 48 seats.
- Political groups: Administration (23) Liberal Democrats (19) Independent (4) Other parties (25) Conservative (18) Green (4) Labour (1) Independent (2)

Elections
- Voting system: First-past-the-post
- Last election: 4 May 2023
- Next election: 6 May 2027

Meeting place
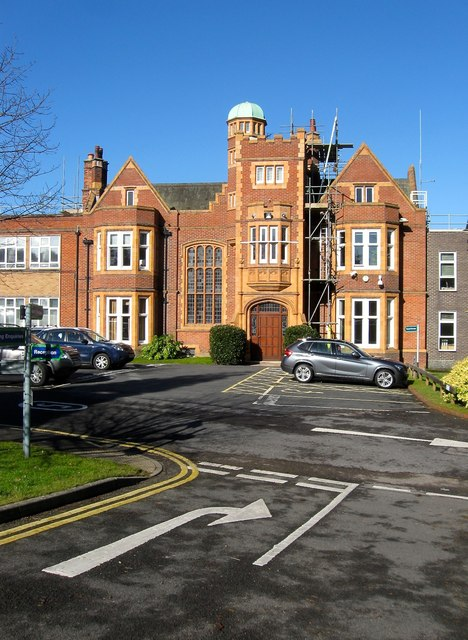
- Oaklands, Oaklands Road, Haywards Heath, RH16 1SS

Website
- www.midsussex.gov.uk

Mid Sussex District Council provides district-level services. County-level services are provided by West Sussex County Council. The whole district is also covered by civil parishes, which form a third tier of local government.

In the parts of the district within the South Downs National Park, town planning is the responsibility of the South Downs National Park Authority. The district council appoints one of its councillors to serve on the 27-person National Park Authority.

=== Political control ===
The council has been under no overall control since the 2023 election, being run by a minority administration of the Liberal Democrats and some of the independent councillors, led by Liberal Democrat councillor Robert Eggleston.

The first elections to the council were held in 1973, initially operating as a shadow authority alongside the outgoing authorities until the new arrangements came into effect on 1 April 1974. Political control of the council since 1974 has been as follows:

Party in control	Years
No overall control	1974–1979
Conservative	1979–1995
Liberal Democrats	1995–1999
Conservative	1999–2023
No overall control	2023–present

=== Leadership ===
The leaders of the council since 2006 have been:

Councillor	Party	From	To
Christine Field	Conservative		17 May 2006
Patrick Shanahan	Conservative	17 May 2006	May 2007
Gordon Marples	Conservative	16 May 2007	31 Oct 2009
Garry Wall	Conservative	18 Nov 2009	May 2019
Jonathan Ash-Edwards	Conservative	22 May 2019	May 2023
Robert Eggleston	Liberal Democrats	24 May 2023	

=== Composition ===
Following the 2023 election, the composition of the council was:

Party	Councillors
Liberal Democrats	20
Conservative	18
Independent	5
Green	4
Labour	1
Total	48

Four of the five independent councillors sit together as the "Independent Group", which forms the council's administration with the Liberal Democrats. The next election is due in 2027.

=== Elections ===
Since the last boundary changes in 2023 the council has comprised 48 councillors representing 27 wards, with each ward electing one, two or three councillors. Elections are held every four years.

The district straddles three parliamentary constituencies; most of the district is in the Mid Sussex constituency, but north-western parts of the district are in the Horsham constituency and southern parts of the district are in the Arundel and South Downs constituency.

=== Premises ===
The council is based at Oaklands, in Haywards Heath, which was originally a large Victorian house and had served as the headquarters of the old Cuckfield Urban District Council (which had included Haywards Heath) since 1934. The building has been substantially extended.

== Towns and parishes ==
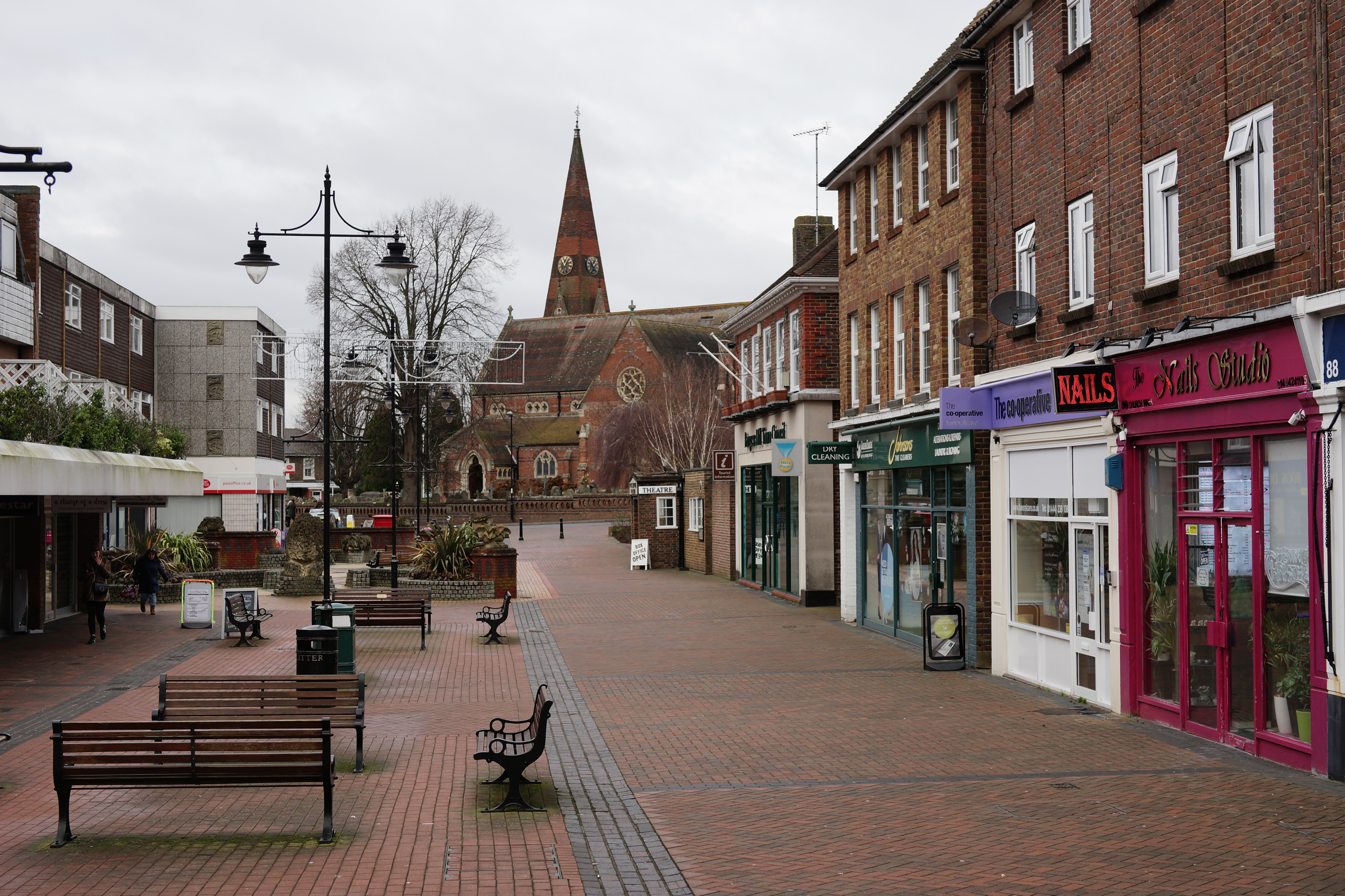
Church Walk, Burgess Hill

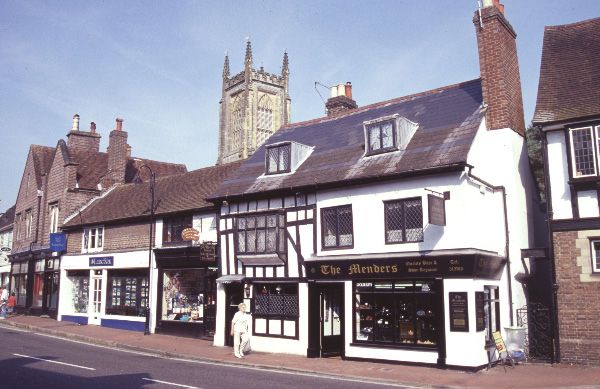
High Street, East Grinstead

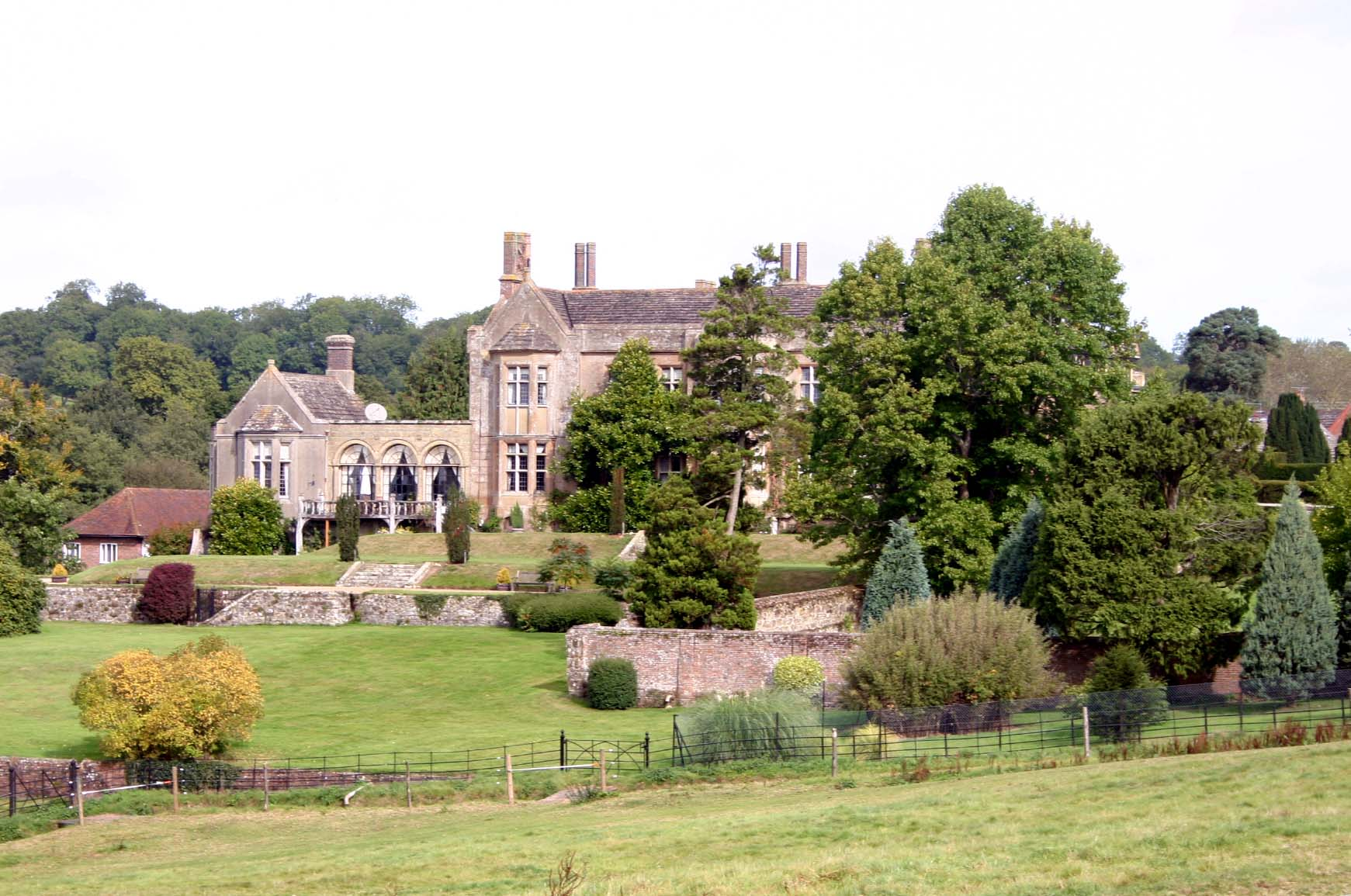
Cuckfield Park, stately home at Cuckfield

The district is divided into 24 civil parishes. The parish councils for Burgess Hill, East Grinstead and Haywards Heath have declared their parishes to be towns, allowing them to take the style "town council". The small parish of Newtimber has a parish meeting rather than a parish council. Hassocks is a post town but has a parish council rather than a town council.

== Home ownership ==
Homes owned by their occupants, with or without a loan, make up more than 85% of Mid Sussex housing. Mid Sussex's residents had the lowest burden of social housing, at 0.5% of housing stock, at the time of the census, a district which is approximately 30 minutes by its fast railway services from the area with the highest such proportion covering London Bridge station, the London Borough of Southwark (having 31.2% social housing) and from a creative and self-declared, progressive authority with 9.8% social housing and 28% of its housing privately rented, Brighton and Hove.

In terms of rented housing Mid Sussex at the 2011 census ranked 216th out of in terms of 327 local authorities in England. The proportion of homes which were rented as investments by non-occupants was higher than several other semi-rural districts of Sussex, with 11.7% of housing stock speculatively acquired in this way or to provide for those unable to obtain mortgage finance and 1.0% was let out to residents on either public or private shared ownership schemes, close to the national average. These figures are those of the 2011 census.

== Media ==
In terms of television, Mid Sussex is served by BBC South East and ITV Meridian (East) with television signals received from the Heathfield TV transmitter. Northern parts of the district around East Grinstead can also receive BBC London and ITV London from the Crystal Palace TV transmitter.

Radio stations for the area are:

- BBC Radio Sussex
- BBC Radio Surrey can also be heard.
- Heart South
- 107 Meridian FM (serving East Grinstead and surrounding areas)
- More Radio Mid-Sussex (serving Burgess Hill and Haywards Heath)

Local newspapers are the Mid Sussex Times and The Sussex Newspaper.
