= Batford Springs =

Nature reserve in Hertfordshire, England

Coordinates: 51.8228°N 0.33866°W

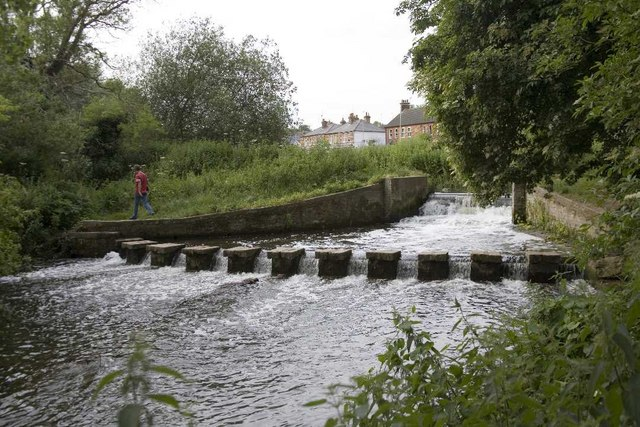
The River Lea in Batford Springs

Batford Springs is a 3.5-hectare (8.6-acre) Local Nature Reserve in Harpenden in Hertfordshire. It is owned and managed by Harpenden Town Council, and most work on the site is undertaken by the Batford Springs Volunteers. The declaring authority is St Albans City Council.

The main feature of the reserve is a number of small springs which are the source of chalk streams and ponds. The River Lea runs through the site, and there is grassland and a small wood. In January 2015 the site was extended by the purchase of land between Marquis Lane and Piggotshill Lane. There is also a children's area. Wildlife includes kingfishers and a variety of fish species in the river, including roach, barbel and a substantial population of chub. Batford Springs acts as a key nursery location for fish downstream all the way to Brocket Hall, where fish movement is severely impeded by man-made obstacles. The next fish nursery is the River Lea adjacent to the North Lake at Stanborough Park.

There is access from the north end of Station Road.

== Gallery ==
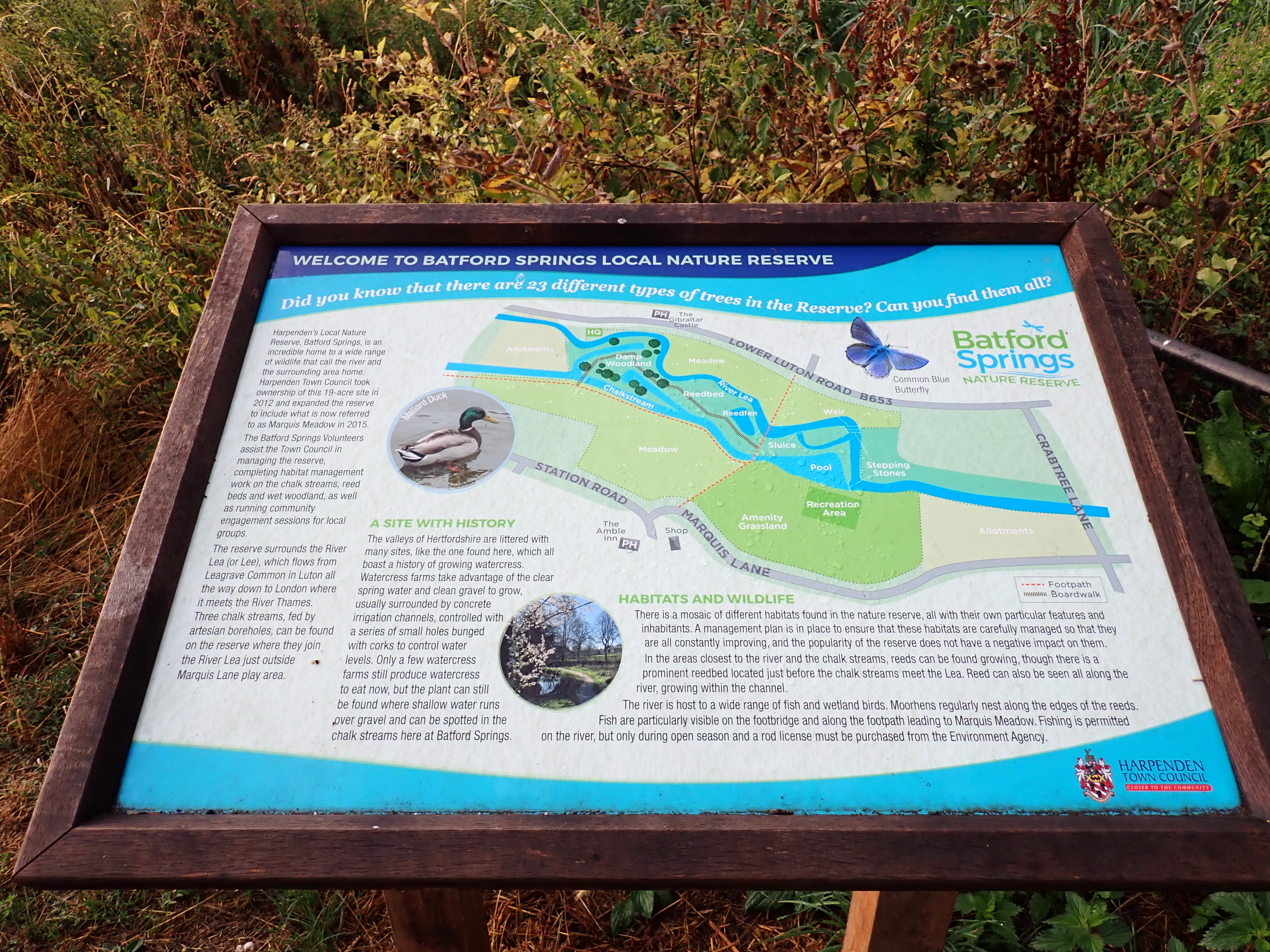
Batford Springs Information Board & Map

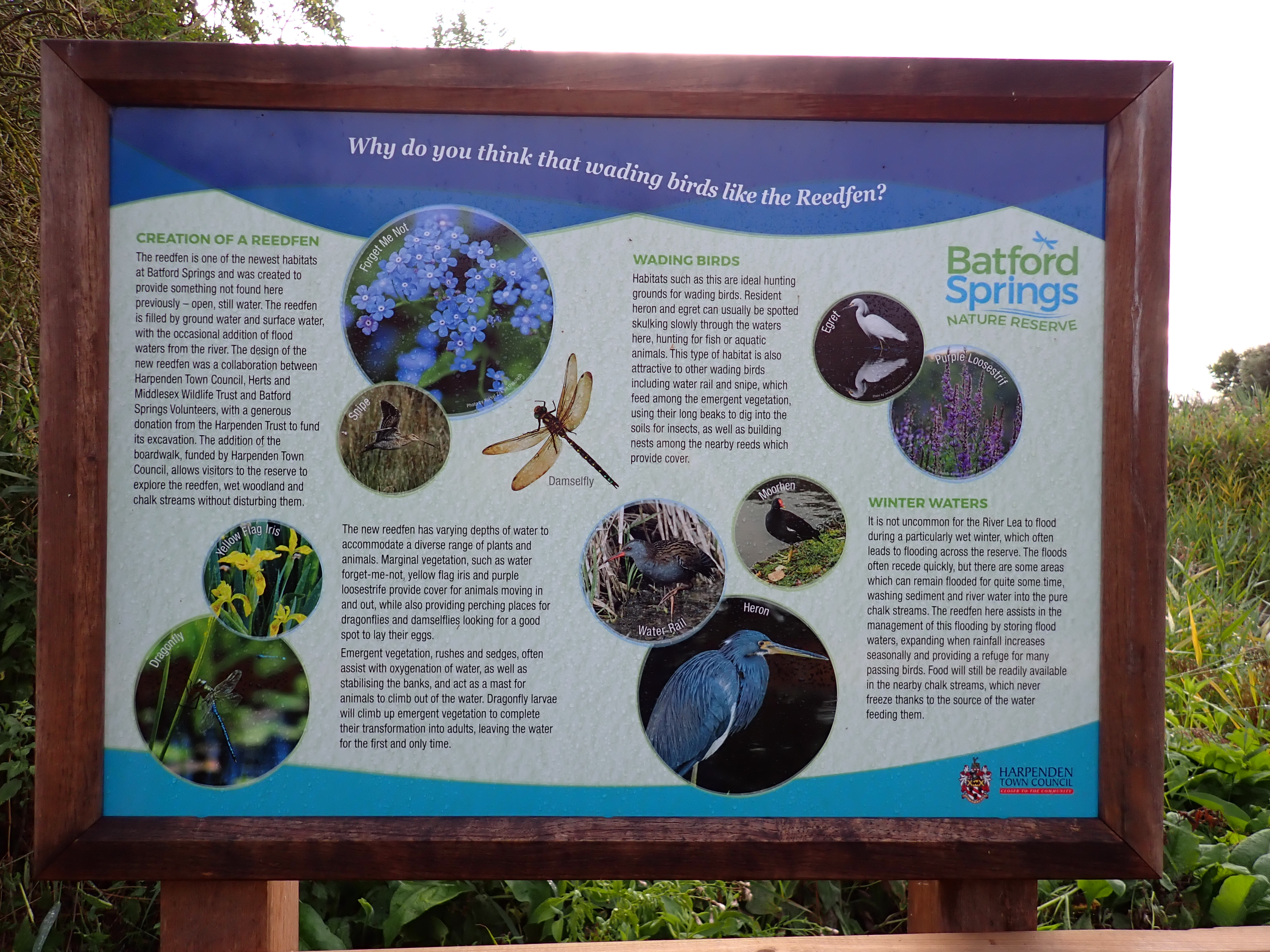
Batford Springs Information Board

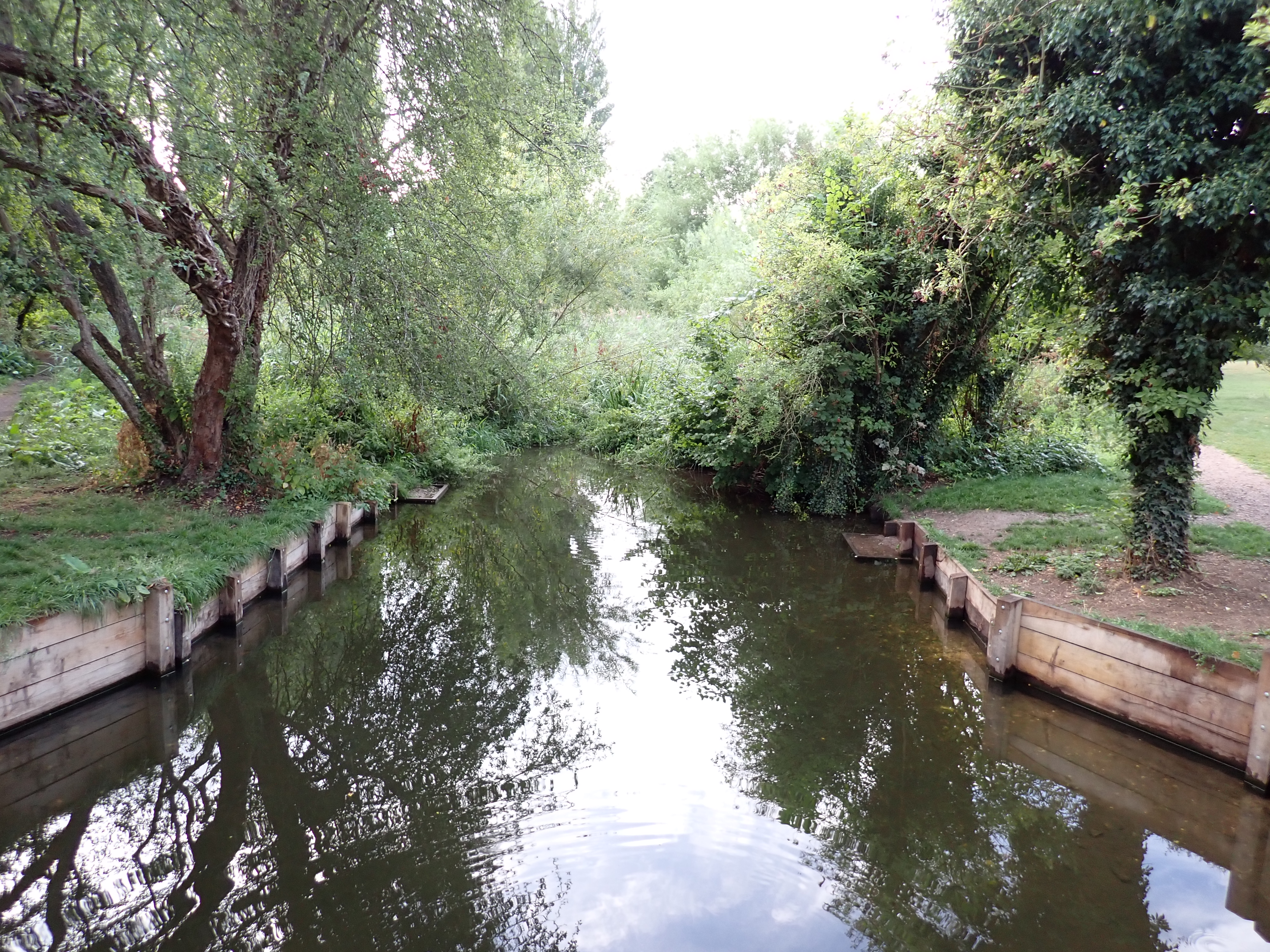
River Lea at Batford Springs

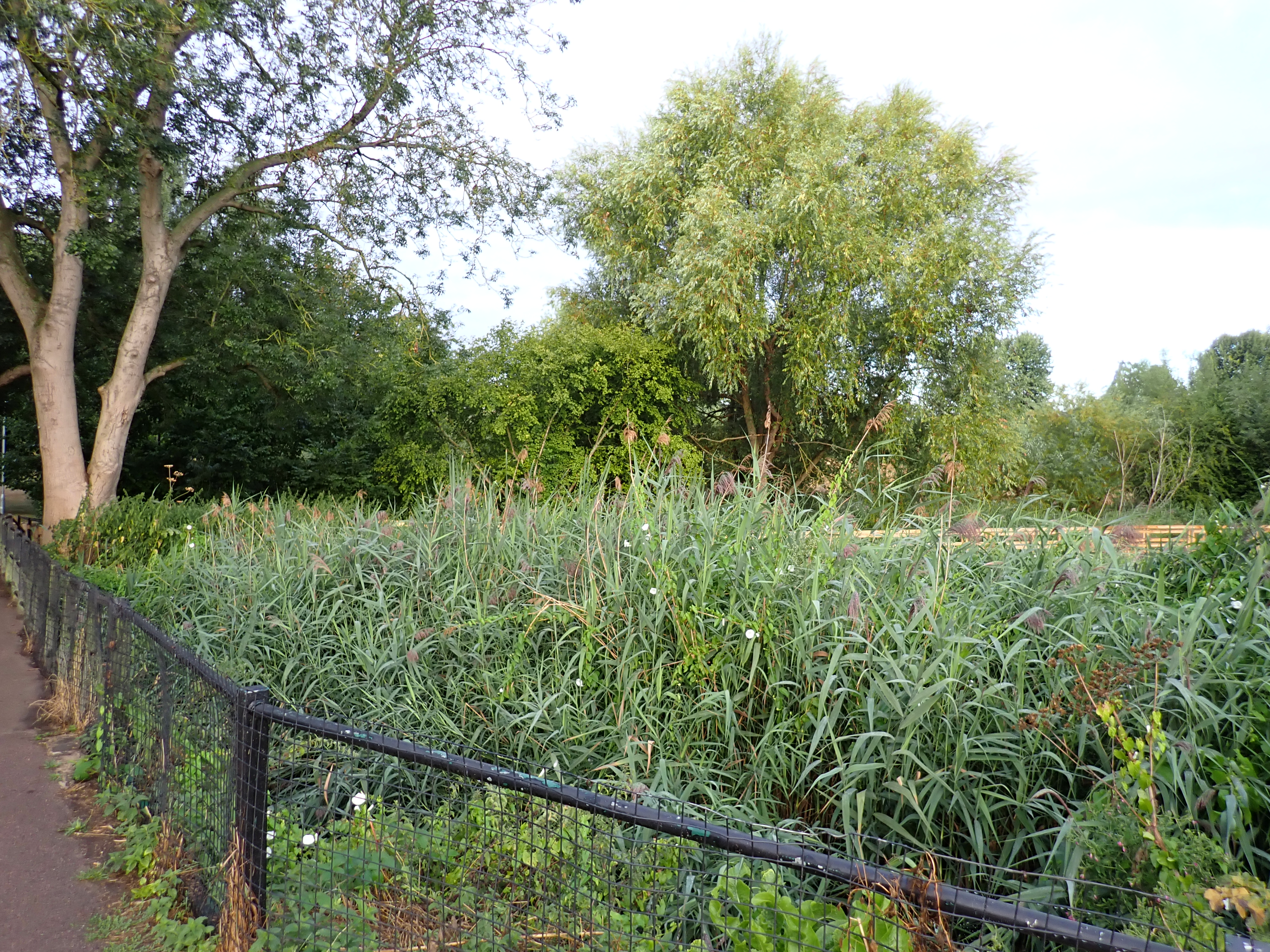
Reeds at Batford Springs

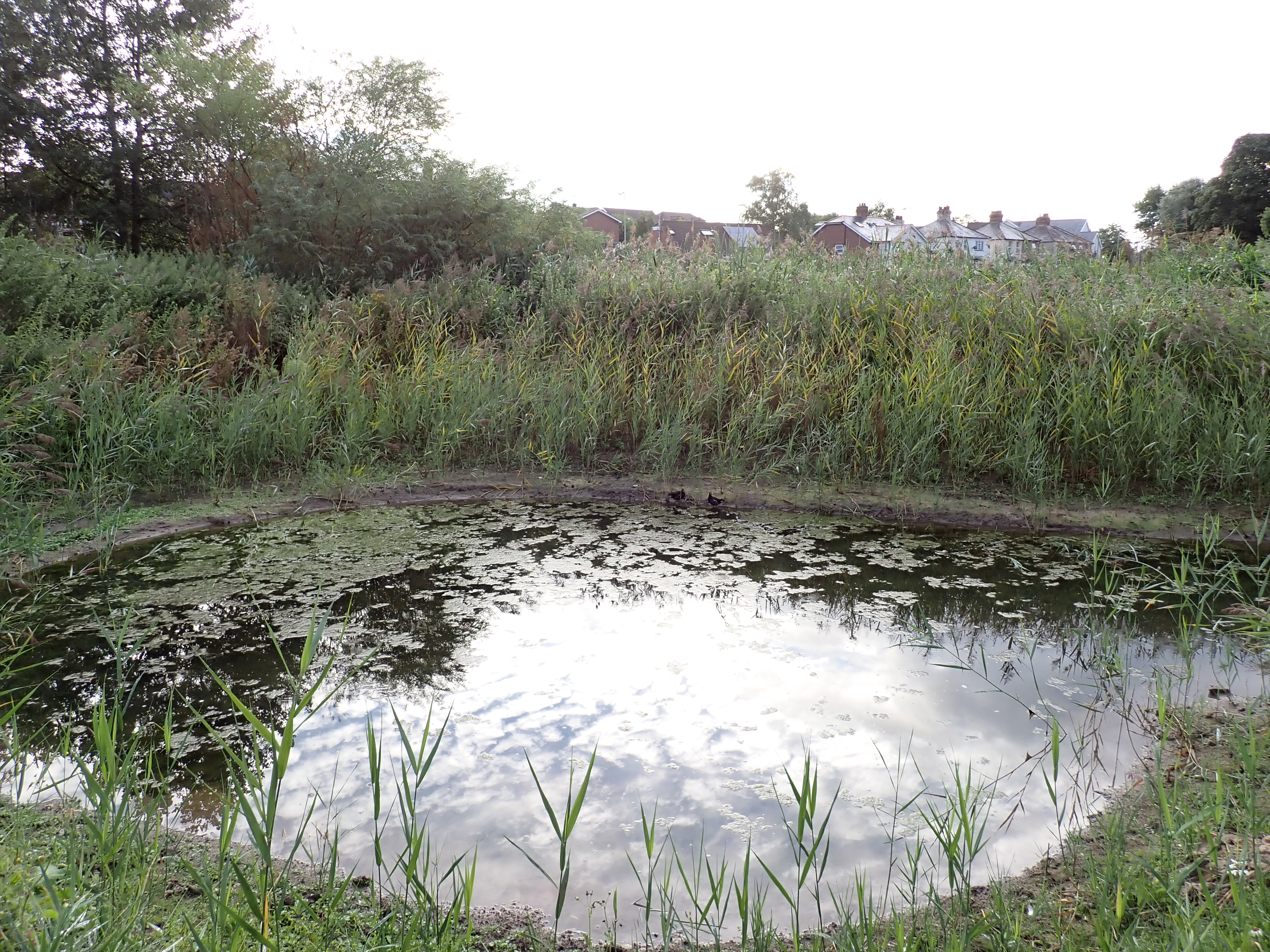
Reedfen at Batford Springs

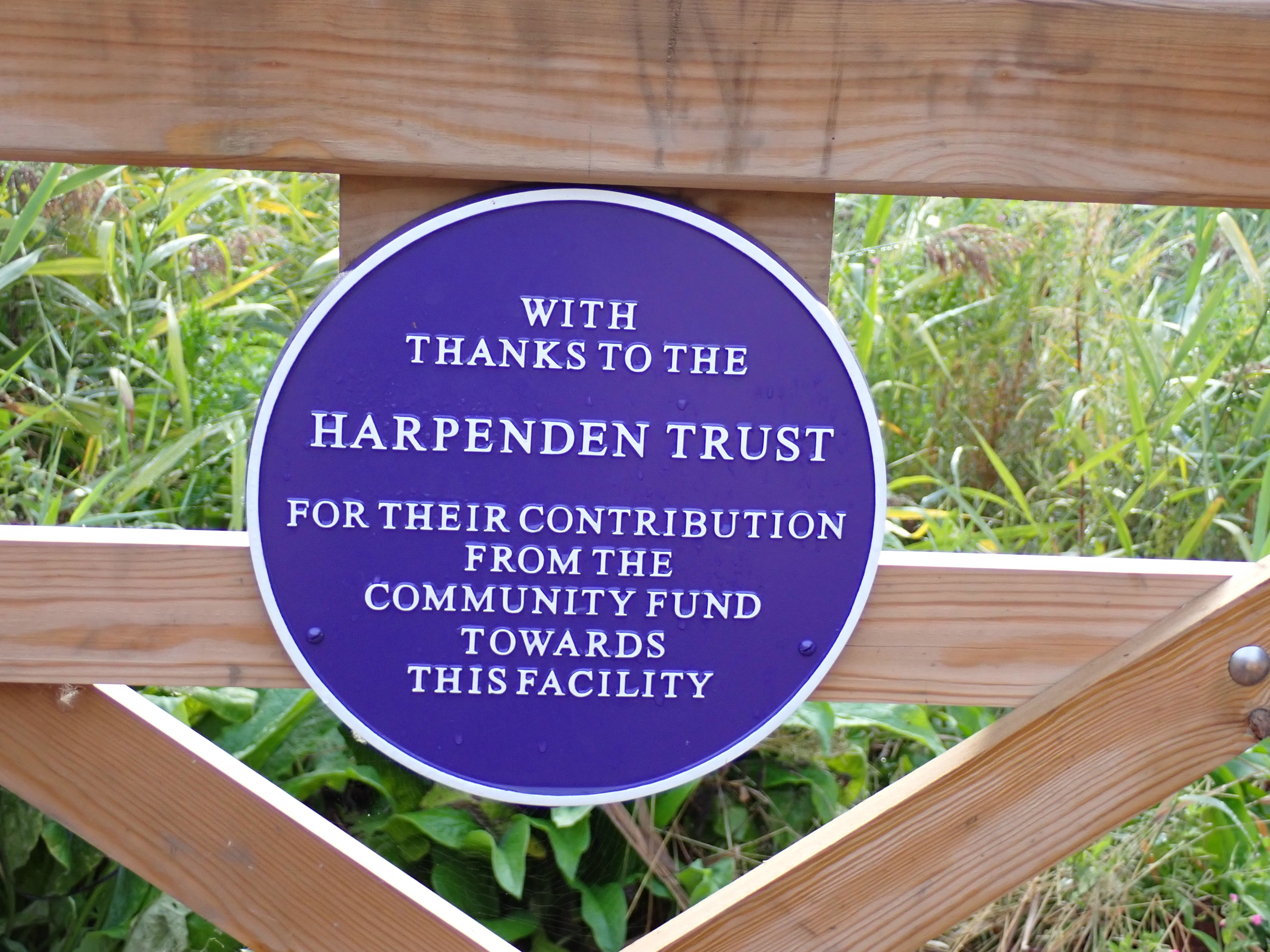
Plaque on Reedfen Boardwalk at Batford Springs

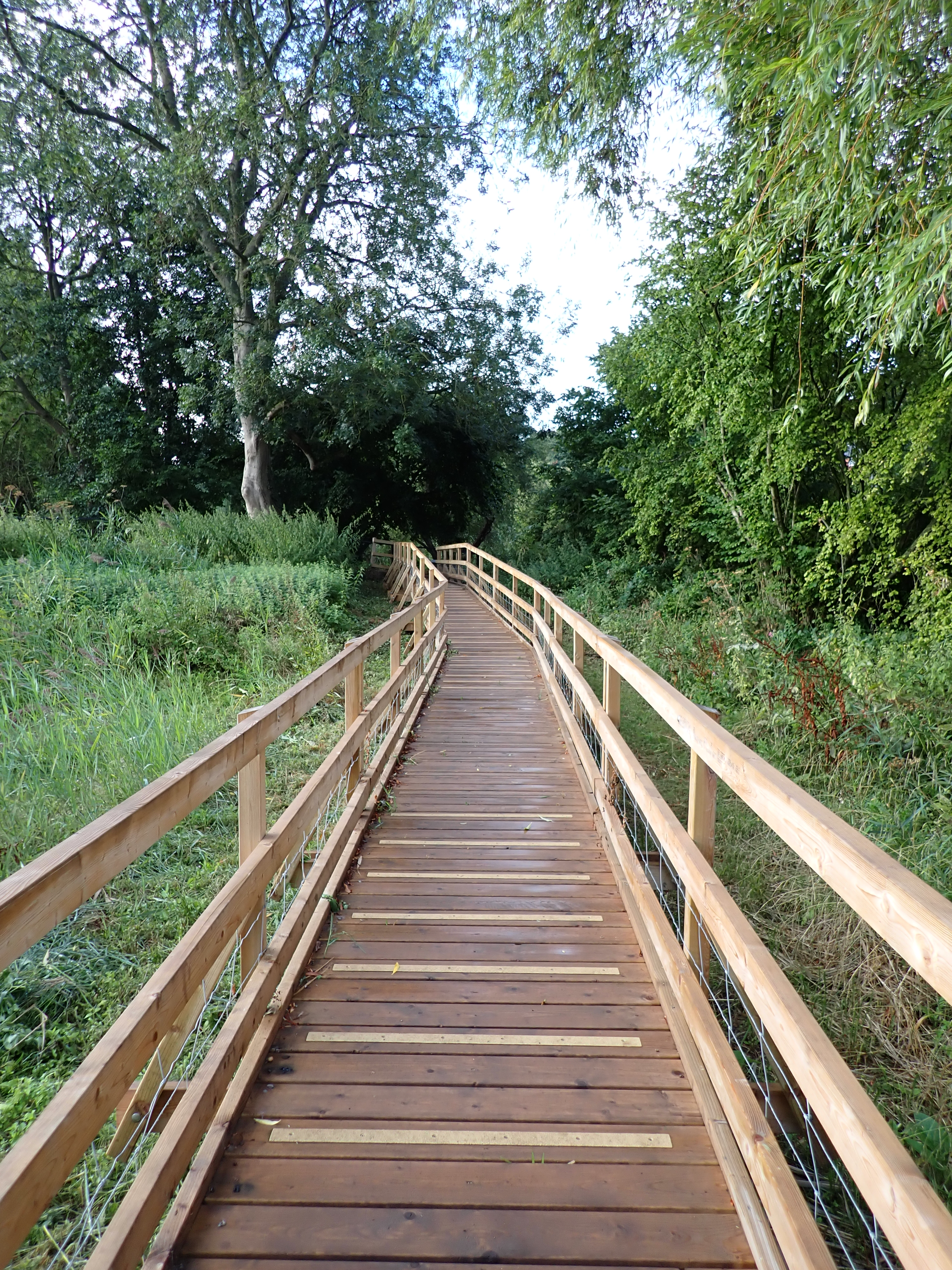
Reedfen Boardwalk at Batford Springs

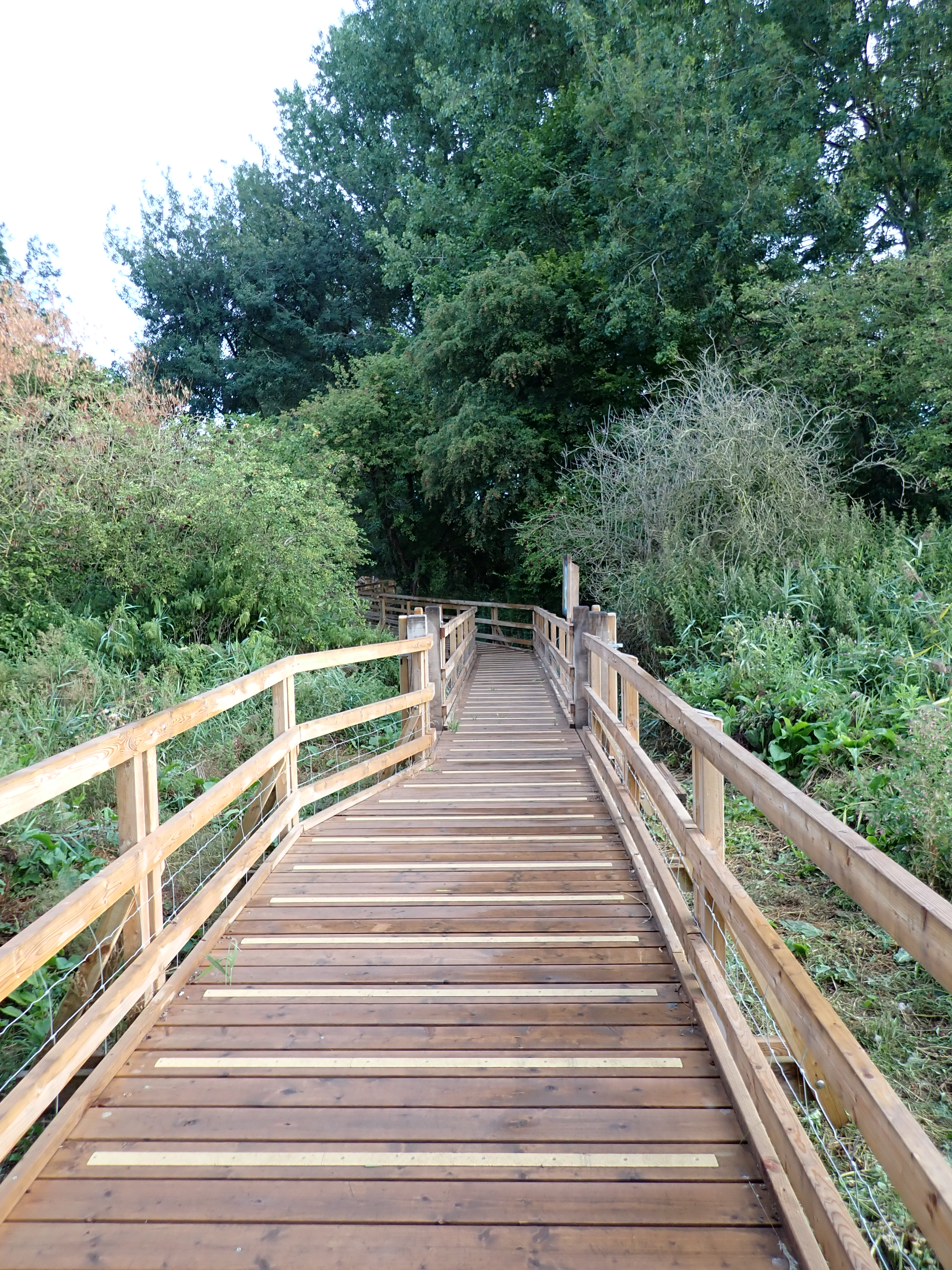
Reedfen Boardwalk at Batford Springs

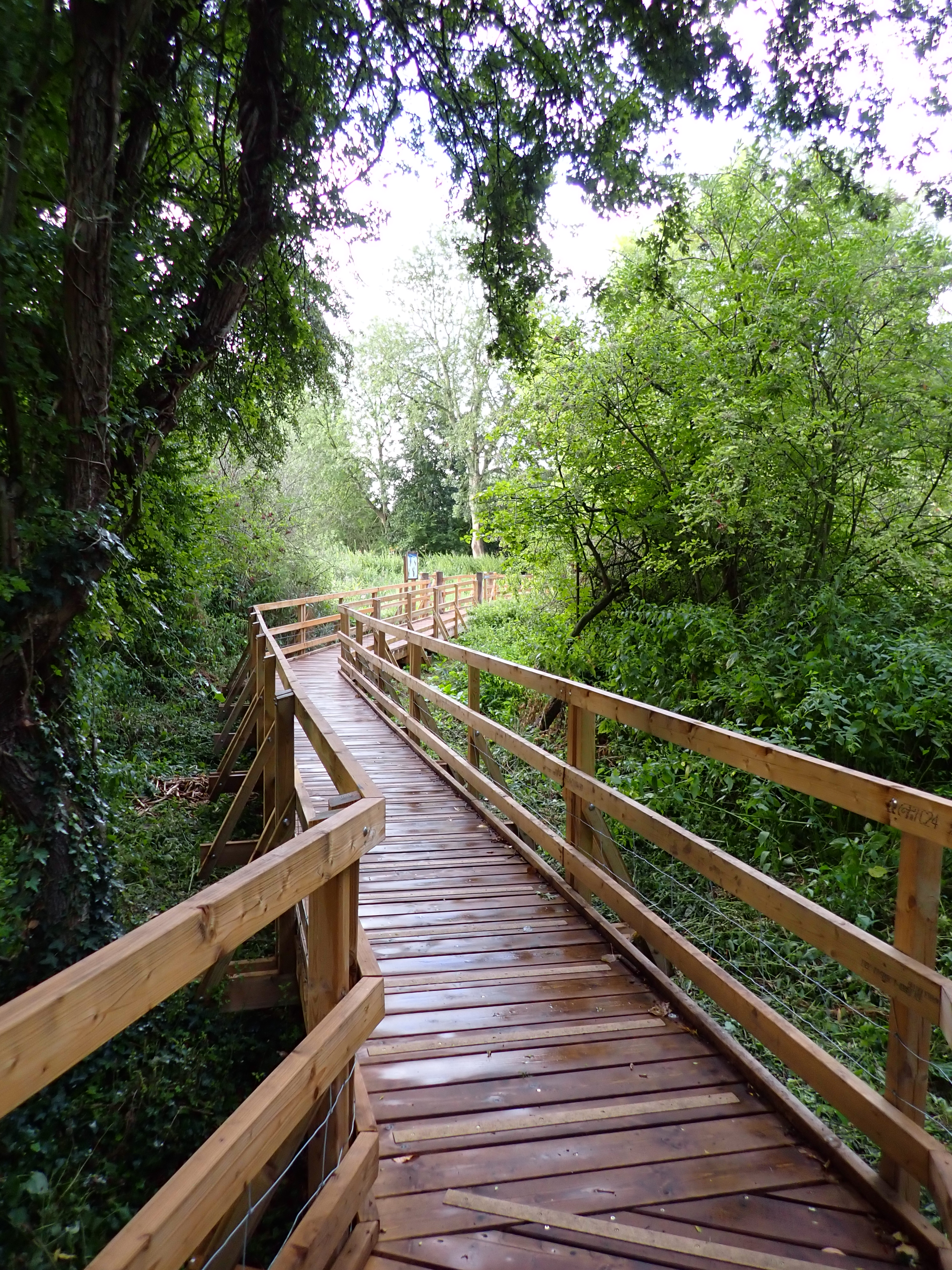
Reedfen Boardwalk at Batford Springs
