= No Candidate Deserves My Vote! =

- Welsh name: Nid oes un ymgeisydd yn haeddu fy mhleidlais
- Leader: Amanda Ringwood
- President: Stephen Phillips
- Treasurer: Bob Goodall
- Other Officer: Margaret Payne
- Founded: 23 November 2000
- Dissolved: 2012
- Headquarters: St Albans
- Ideology: Electoral reform None of the above
- Colours: White and black

No Candidate Deserves My Vote! (often abbreviated NCDMV!; in Welsh Nid oes un ymgeisydd yn haeddu fy mhleidlais) was a registered political party of the United Kingdom. The party's core policies were to bring about electoral reform by putting a none of the above option onto every ballot paper of the future. That way the disaffected voter could use their vote to say that none of the parties currently represents them.

At the 7 June 2001 County Council elections in Hertfordshire, the party stood its first candidates, its best result being 2.5% of the vote (174 votes) in St Albans South. The party took the view that offering the opportunity of positive abstention could assist in increasing voter turnout. The results of the MORI survey conducted for the commission after the election offers some support for this suggestion: 12% of those asked said that being able to vote for None of the above candidates would have made them more likely to vote, and the figure increases markedly to 33% for non-voters. However the evidence from international practice in this regard is inconclusive. The Commission does not believe that the case is yet made for the introduction of positive abstention within the UK electoral practice, but intends to undertake a more thorough examination of the issues involved.

The party planned to field as many candidates as they could in the 2010 General Election. Stephen Phillips (a.k.a. Steve of Stevenage) planned to stand in the Stevenage Constituency, and Eric Mutch of Staple Hill, South Gloucestershire changed his name by deed poll to Zero None Of The Above and announced his intention to stand in the constituency of Bristol South; however, he changed his mind and handed in nomination papers for Filton and Bradley Stoke.

The party deregistered with the Electoral Commission in 2012.

== History ==
- November 2000 - The party was founded by Amanda Ringwood (née Gardner) and Bob Goodall.
- June 2001 - The party fielded five candidates in the local elections, four in the St Albans South, East, North and Central wards of the Hertfordshire County Council elections, and one in the Sopwell ward of the St Albans District Council elections.
- May 2002 - Four candidates stood in the Ashley, Sandridge, Sopwell and Verulam wards of the St Albans Local Council elections and one candidate stood in the Southfields ward of the Ealing Local Council elections.
- February 2010 - Stephen Phillips was elected as the party President to act as media spokesman for the party.

To date, the highest number of votes gained in one ward is 174 which represented 2.5% of the vote in the St Albans South ward during the Herts County Council elections in June 2001. The highest vote percentage gained is 3.16% in the Sopwell ward during the St Albans Local Council elections in May 2002.

== Core policies ==
No Candidate Deserves My Vote! has just one core policy:

- To add a none of the above option onto the bottom of every ballot paper of the future, with the intention to give the disaffected voter a reason to turn out to vote.

Any successful candidates will have the choice of standing down to force an automatic by-election or staying on to act as an independent for all other issues.

== Political objectives ==
To either get candidates elected to the UK parliament or to cause as much a stir as possible for the need for a none of the above option that electoral reform comes about as a result.

== See also ==
- Electoral Reform Society
- Make Votes Matter
