= Jonathan Ash-Edwards =

British politician

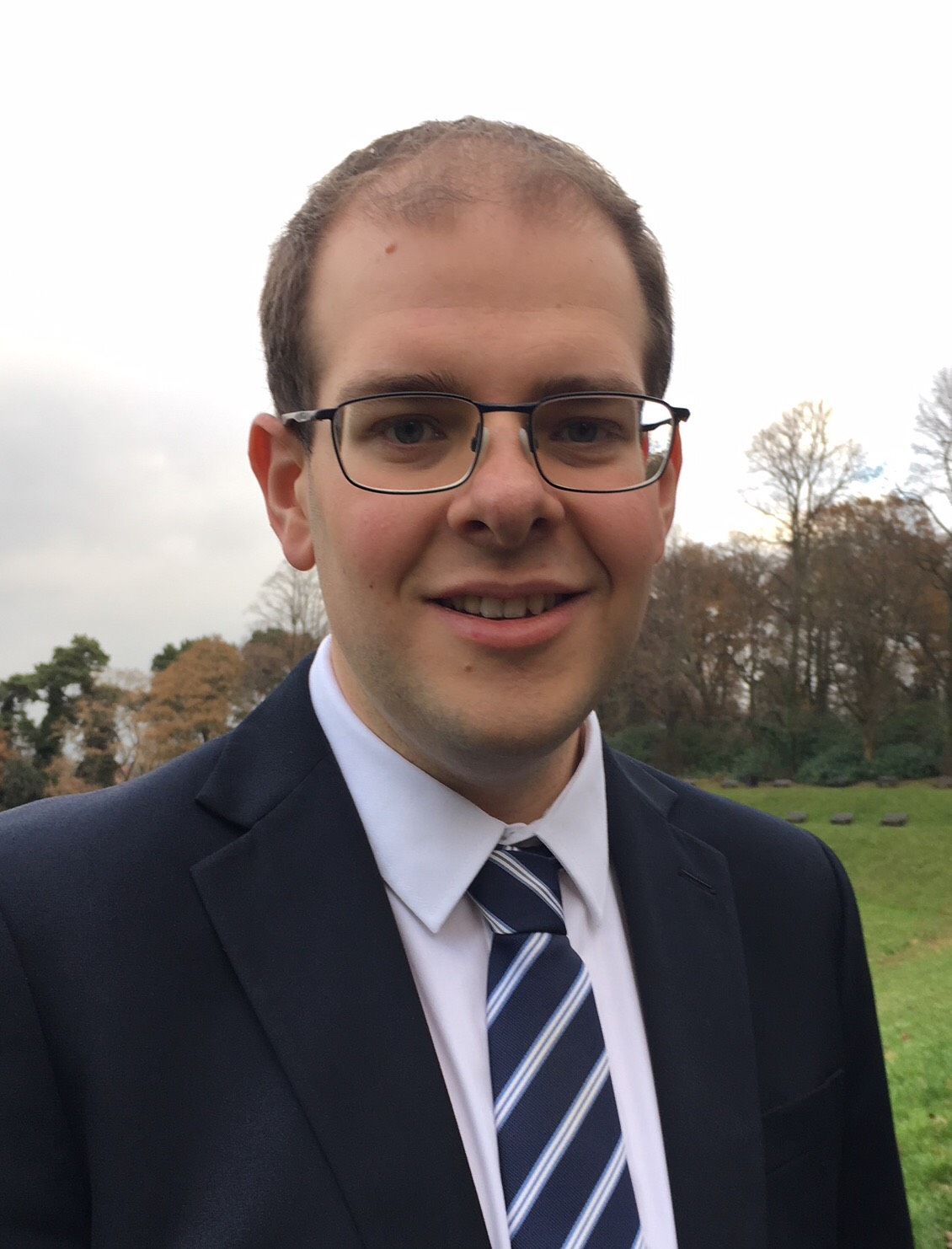
- Ash-Edwards in 2019

Hertfordshire Police and Crime Commissioner
- Incumbent
- Assumed office 9 May 2024
- Preceded by: David Lloyd

Leader of Mid Sussex District Council
- In office 22 May 2019 – 7 May 2023
- Preceded by: Garry Wall
- Succeeded by: Robert Egglston

Personal details
- Party: Conservative
- Education: Open University

Jonathan Christopher Ash-Edwards (born 1986–87) is a British Conservative Party politician, and the Hertfordshire Police and Crime Commissioner since May 2024, when he succeeded fellow Conservative David Lloyd. He previously served as a Councillor on Mid Sussex District council and as Leader of the Council from 2019 to 2023. He lost his seat in the 2023 Mid Sussex District Council election.

== Early life ==
Ash-Edwards attended the Open University, and obtained a degree in Business Management.

== Political career ==
Ash-Edwards was elected to represent Haywards Heath's Heath Ward on Mid Sussex District Council in 2007, at age 20, while continuing to study for his degree. In 2019, Ash-Edwards switched to Lindfield ward. From shortly after the 2019 Elections to 2023, Ash-Edwards served as Leader of Mid Sussex District Council. In 2023, Ash-Edwards was not re-elected.

Shortly thereafter he moved to Hertfordshire, to seek selection and election as the Conservative Party's candidate for Hertfordshire Police and Crime Commissioner. In May 2024, he was elected to the role.

== Professional career ==
Ash-Edwards is chair of trustees and director of Sussex Learning Trust, which is responsible for a number of academy schools across Sussex.
