= Hertfordshire Constabulary =

English territorial police force

- Motto: Creating A Safer Hertfordshire

Agency overview
- Formed: 1841; 185 years ago
- Preceding agencies: Hertford Borough Police; St Albans Borough Police
- Employees: 4045
- Volunteers: 266
- Annual budget: £313 million

Jurisdictional structure
- Operations jurisdiction: Hertfordshire, England, UK
- Map of police area
- Area: 634 square miles (1,640 km^{2})
- Population: 1.5 million
- Legal jurisdiction: England & Wales
- Constituting instrument: Police Act 1996
- General nature: Local civilian police

Operational structure
- Overseen by: His Majesty's Inspectorate of Constabulary and Fire & Rescue Services; Independent Office for Police Conduct
- Headquarters: Welwyn Garden City
- Constables: 1,953 (of which 410 are special constables)
- Police Community Support Officers: 246
- Police and Crime Commissioner responsible: Jonathan Ash-Edwards
- Agency executive: Andy Prophet, Chief Constable
- Stations: 21

Website
- www.herts.police.uk

Hertfordshire Constabulary is the territorial police force responsible for policing the county of Hertfordshire in England. Its headquarters is in Welwyn Garden City. The current chief constable is Andy Prophet. As of March 2019, the force consists of over 1,900 police officers, 235 PCSOs, and over 1,500 police staff, as well as being supported by more than 410 special constables.

== History ==
The constabulary was founded in 1841, under the County Police Act, five years after the Hertford Borough Police and St Albans Borough Police had been formed. The first constables were working-class men and were paid at the level of an agricultural labourer. In Victorian times, officers were entitled to only one rest day in every four to six weeks and were entitled to only one week's unpaid annual leave a year. A ten-hour working day was the norm and no meal breaks were allowed.

There were strict constraints on an officer's private life too. For example, officers reportedly could not leave their homes without permission, and could only go out with their wives as long as they were not absent for more than two hours and someone was at home to take messages.

=== Mergers ===
In 1889, the Hertford Borough Police force was merged into Hertfordshire. St Albans Constabulary remained independent until 1947, but was then absorbed into the Hertfordshire Constabulary. Finally, in 2000 the current force boundaries came into place with the addition of Hertsmere and Broxbourne, transferred from the Metropolitan Police District.

In 2006, proposals were made by Charles Clarke, the then Home Secretary, that would see the force merge with neighbour forces Bedfordshire Police and Essex Police to form a new strategic police force. but in July that year Prime Minister Tony Blair signalled that such mergers would not be forced through by the central government.

=== Collaboration ===
Despite the scotching of the 2006 merger, with the economic recession beginning in 2008 the force began working on collaboration with neighbouring forces, first joining with Bedfordshire Police and then Cambridgeshire Constabulary in a strategic alliance. The three forces formed joint units in counter terrorism, major crime, dogs, firearms, SOCO, roads policing, operation planning, civil contingencies, ICT and professional standards.

Working collaboratively in this way protected local policing by local officers, but enabled specialist units to work across, and be paid for by, all three forces. Call handling, control and dispatch, human resources and some "back-office" functions were also examined for merging in 2014. For the foreseeable future, the Constabulary looks likely to remain an independent force.

=== Chief constables ===
- 1841–1880: Archibald Robertson
- 1880–1910: H. Smith Daniell
- 1910–1928: Alfred Letchworth Law
- 1928–1939: George Thomas Knight
- 1939–1943: Sydney Ewart Fairman
- 1943–1945: Abel Camp
- 1945–1947: Arthur Edwin Young
- 1947–1969: Albert Frederick Wilcox
- 1969–1977: Raymond N. Buxton
- 1977–1984: Adrian Clissitt
- 1984–1990: Trefor A. Morris
- 1990–1994: Baden (Bill) Henry Skitt
- 1994–2000: Peter S. Sharpe
- 2000–2004: Paul Acres
- 2004–2011: Frank Whiteley
- 2011–2016: Andy Bliss
- 2016–2024: Charlie Hall
- 2025–present: Andy Prophet

=== Officers killed in the line of duty ===
The Police Roll of Honour Trust and Police Memorial Trust list and commemorate all British police officers killed in the line of duty. Since its establishment in 1984, the Police Memorial Trust has erected 50 memorials nationally to some of those officers. Since 1950, the following officers of Hertfordshire Constabulary are listed by the Trust as having been killed in the line of duty:

Rank	Name	Age	Year of death	Circumstances
PC	Frank Edwin Hulme	31	1958	Collapsed and died after a violent arrest.
PC	Arthur William Burch	38	1960	PC Burch and PC Silcock were both killed while travelling in a patrol car which collided with a tanker, while pursuing a speeding car.
PC	Anthony Richard Silcock	25	1960	PC Burch and PC Silcock were both killed while travelling in a patrol car which collided with a tanker, while pursuing a speeding car.
WPC	Mandy Dawn Rayner	18	1982	Fatally injured when her stationary vehicle was rammed during a police pursuit.
PC	Francis John Mason	27	1988	Shot dead when, despite being off duty, he intervened in an armed robbery. Posthumously awarded the Queen's Gallantry Medal.
WPC	Jacqueline Ann Brown	23	1989	Fatally injured in a patrol car crash during a prisoner escort at Harpenden.
PC	Ronald Raymond Hull	35	1989	Killed assisting at an accident in thick fog when struck by a speeding car.
PC	Kevin John Church	46	2005	Killed in a motorcycle accident while on a plain clothes policing operation.

== Organisation and structure ==
=== Local policing ===
A Peugeot 308 SW patrol vehicle at Elstree Aerodrome in 2024

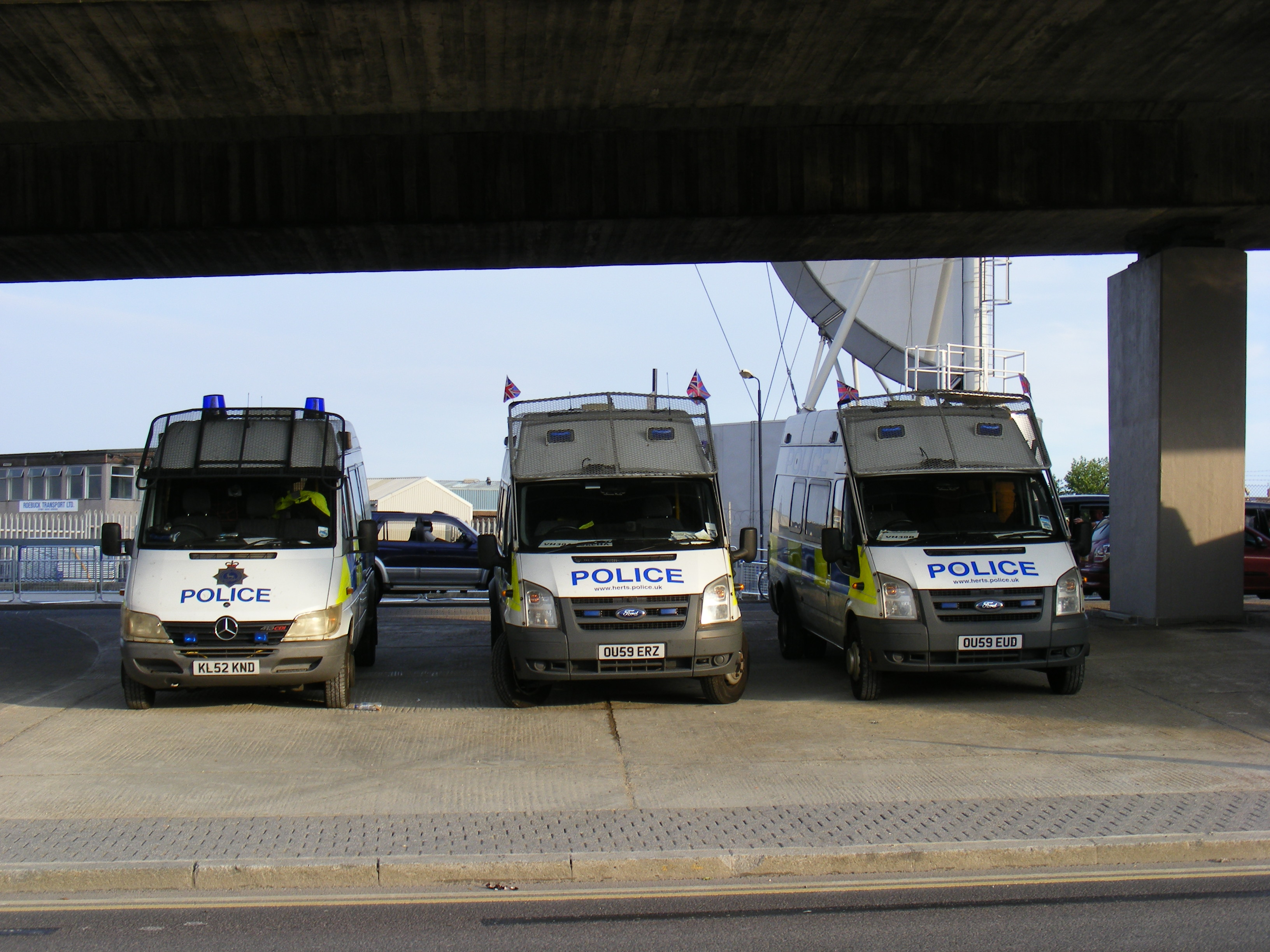
Public order vans at the 2012 Olympic Games

Local policing is overseen by the Local Policing Command, headed by a chief superintendent. The county is sub-divided into ten divisions, also known as Community Safety Partnerships (CSP), which broadly correspond to the local Borough and Council areas. The ten CSPs, each headed by a chief inspector are: Watford, Three Rivers, Dacorum, Welwyn and Hatfield, St Albans, Hertsmere, East Herts, Broxbourne, Stevenage and North Herts. Each CSP has:

- Five Response Teams (formerly Intervention Teams): Each team is headed by a sergeant and aligned to a shift pattern, there is always at least one team on duty at any time during the year. Response teams respond to 999 and non emergency calls and perform general patrol duties.
- Neighbourhood Policing Teams (formerly Safety Neighbourhood Teams): Combined teams of PCs and PCSOs covering local and quality of life issues. Each Ward/Neighbourhood has at least one PC and PCSO to maintain an up-to-date knowledge of local issues and to address them. Each town is headed by a sergeant, with an inspector supervising on a CSP level.
- CID (formerly Local Crime Unit): Team of Detectives with a remit covering burglaries to assaults and more complex investigations.

=== Specialist units ===
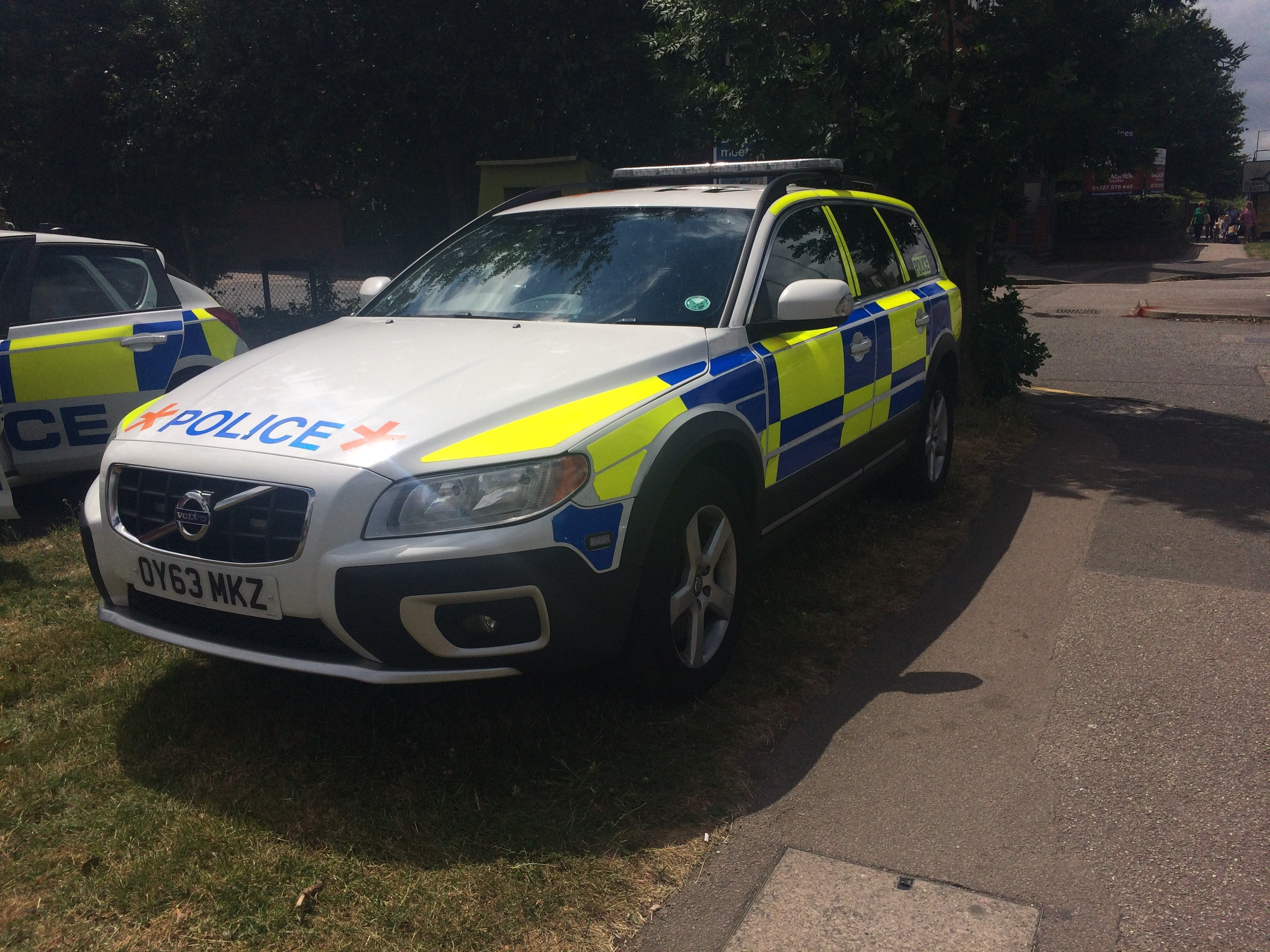
An Armed Response Vehicle seen in Borehamwood in 2017

Local policing is supplemented by an array of specialist units, some of which are collaborated with Bedfordshire and Cambridgeshire. These include:

- Armed Policing Unit: Collaborated unit working across the three counties providing Armed Response Vehicles, crewed with authorised firearms officers to assist in the response to potentially dangerous incidents such as those involving firearms and knives. The unit also provides a specialist firearms officer capability for hostage rescue and close protection.
- Dog Unit: Collaborated unit providing a 24/7 police dog service for tracking, searching and public order duties. The unit also provides pre-planned capabilities for explosive and drugs search.
- Road Policing Unit: Collaborated unit, primarily patrol and respond to serious incidents on the motorway and other road networks. Other duties include responsibilities for taking over pursuits, traffic management and road death investigation.
- Major Crime Unit: Collaborated unit, responsible for the investigation of murder, stranger rape and kidnap, amongst others.

=== Operational Support ===
- Force Communications Room (FCR): Responsible for taking emergency and non-emergency calls and recording crime through call handling and the deployment and management of resources through Despatch and Control. The FCR receives an average of 3,000 calls and deals with over 1,000 incidents every day.

== Notable incidents and investigations ==
Notable major incidents and investigations in which Hertfordshire Constabulary have directed or been involved include:

- October 2000: Hatfield rail crash: A railway accident that caused four deaths and over 70 injuries. The accident exposed major stewardship shortcomings and regulatory oversight failings of Railtrack and ultimately triggered its partial re-nationalisation.
- May 2002: Potters Bar Railway Crash: A railway accident that occurred when a train derailed at high speed, killing seven and injuring 76. Part of the train ended up wedged between the station platforms and building structures.
- December 2005: The Buncefield fire: A major fire caused by a series of explosions at the Buncefield oil storage facility causing 45 injuries. It was the largest peacetime explosion since the Second World War and the plume of smoke could be seen from space.
- March 2009: Murder of Jeffrey Howe: Also known as the Jigsaw Murder.
- July 2011: Typing error causes false accusation of paedophilia: In April 2014, Hertfordshire Constabulary acknowledged that three years before while investigating distribution of more than 100 indecent images of children their mistyping of an IP address had led to arrest and charges against the wrong person, the male partner of a woman to whom the mistyped IP address happened to be allocated. In October 2016, Hertfordshire Constabulary settled out of court paying damages and legal costs.
- May 2012: Rothamsted Research protests: Approximately 200 protesters attempted to occupy an agricultural research centre that was conducting tests on genetically modified wheat.
- July–August 2012: 2012 Summer Olympics: The Lee Valley White Water Centre, in Waltham Cross hosted the canoe slalom events of the 2012 Summer Olympics. Hertfordshire Constabulary deployed significant resources in support of the security of the White Water Centre, and supplied officers on mutual aid to the locations in London.
- June 2013: Bilderberg meeting: Hertfordshire Constabulary deployed large numbers of resources, including officers from other forces on mutual aid, in an operation around the Bilderberg Group meeting at The Grove Hotel, Watford.
- March and November 2021: Armed police raided wrong addresses on two separate operations.
- November 2025: Rosalind Levine and Maxie Allen are paid £20,000 in damages after Hertfordshire police unlawfully arrested a couple for making complaints about their local primary school on a WhatsApp channel.
- April 2026: IT Director Samuel Smith is paid £34,000 compensation after Hertfordshire police settle out of court; Smith was unlawfully arrested by 12 police officers and detained overnight following complaints received about blog post he wrote discussing a woman falsely accused of being a paedophile.
- November 2026: Christian pastor Steve Maile, who was arrested in Watford and detained for 12 hours after publicly criticising Islam, had his case dropped by police after intervention by the Christian Legal Centre. Maile, who was double-handcuffed by officers for 90 minutes, subsequently requiring splints on his hands for weeks after the arrest, is now seeking civil damages against the force.

== See also ==
- Law enforcement in the United Kingdom
- List of law enforcement agencies in the United Kingdom
- Table of police forces in the United Kingdom
- Hertfordshire Police and Crime Commissioner
