= Mid Sussex District Council elections =

Local government elections in West Sussex, England

Mid Sussex District Council is elected every four years.

== Council elections ==
- 1973 Mid Sussex District Council election
- 1976 Mid Sussex District Council election
- 1979 Mid Sussex District Council election
- 1983 Mid Sussex District Council election (New ward boundaries & district boundary changes also took place)
- 1984 Mid Sussex District Council election
- 1986 Mid Sussex District Council election (District boundary changes took place but the number of seats remained the same)
- 1987 Mid Sussex District Council election
- 1991 Mid Sussex District Council election
- 1995 Mid Sussex District Council election (District boundary changes took place but the number of seats remained the same)
- 1999 Mid Sussex District Council election
- 2003 Mid Sussex District Council election (New ward boundaries)
- 2007 Mid Sussex District Council election
- 2011 Mid Sussex District Council election
- 2015 Mid Sussex District Council election
- 2019 Mid Sussex District Council election
- 2023 Mid Sussex District Council election (New ward boundaries)

== Election results ==
Composition of the council
Year	Conservative	Liberal Democrats (Note: Includes totals for the predecessors of the Liberal Democrats, the Liberal Party and SDP (both of which participated in the Alliance).)	Labour	Green (Note: Includes totals for the predecessors of the Green Party of England and Wales, the Ecology Party and Green Party UK.)	Independents & Others	Council control after election
Local government reorganisation; council established (54 seats)
1973	25	5	3	–	21	No overall control
1976	25	5	3	0	21	No overall control
1979	39	2	0	0	13	Conservative
New ward boundaries (54 seats)
1983	43	5	0	0	6	Conservative
1987	36	13	0	0	5	Conservative
1991	34	13	2	0	5	Conservative
1995	18	28	4	0	4	Liberal Democrats
1999	29	21	2	0	2	Conservative
New ward boundaries (54 seats)
2003	28	24	2	0	0	Conservative
2007	31	22	1	0	0	Conservative
2011	45	8	1	0	0	Conservative
2015	54	0	0	0	0	Conservative
2019	34	13	0	3	4	Conservative
New ward boundaries (48 seats)
2023	18	20	1	4	5	No overall control

== Results maps ==
2003 results map

2007 results map

2011 results map

2015 results map

2019 results map

2023 results map

== By-election results ==
=== 2003–2007 ===
Hurstpierpoint and Downs By-Election 5 May 2005
Party	Candidate	Votes	%	±%
Conservative	Charles Maidment	1,890	50.4	+3.8
Liberal Democrats	Rodney Jackson	1,240	33.1	−0.8
Labour	Ann Morgan	619	16.5	−3.0
Majority		650	17.3	
Turnout		3,749		
Conservative hold		Swing		

=== 2007–2011 ===
Burgess Hill St Andrews By-Election 3 July 2008 (2)
Party	Candidate	Votes	%	±%
Liberal Democrats	Janice Henwood	876		
Liberal Democrats	Graham Knight	829		
Conservative	Peter Burgess	561		
Conservative	Jim Clapperton	501		
Green	Philip Smith	65		
Labour	Leigh Marshall	40		
Turnout		2,872	42.1	
Liberal Democrats hold		Swing		
Liberal Democrats hold		Swing		

Hurstpierpoint and Downs By-Election 24 July 2008
Party	Candidate	Votes	%	±%
Conservative	Jack Callaghan	1,040	51.4	+11.0
Liberal Democrats	Rodney Jackson	608	30.1	+3.3
Green	Mike Airey	374	18.5	−4.8
Majority		432	21.3	
Turnout		2,022	35.9	
Conservative hold		Swing		

Haywards Heath Bentswood By-Election 22 January 2009
Party	Candidate	Votes	%	±%
Liberal Democrats	Irene Balls	514	36.9	+1.4
Labour	Richard Goddard	456	32.7	−2.6
Conservative	Andy Mackintosh	332	23.8	−5.4
BNP	Tony Brewer	92	6.6	+6.6
Majority		58	4.2	
Turnout		1,394		
Liberal Democrats hold		Swing		

Cuckfield By-Election 6 May 2010
Party	Candidate	Votes	%	±%
Conservative	Robert Salisbury	1,597	54.0	−11.7
Liberal Democrats	Stephen Blanch	1,362	46.0	+11.7
Majority		235	8.0	
Turnout		2,959		
Conservative hold		Swing		

Haywards Heath Heath By-Election 6 May 2010
Party	Candidate	Votes	%	±%
Liberal Democrats	Sue Ng	1,350	46.9	+1.4
Conservative	Robert Salisbury	1,310	45.5	−9.0
Labour	Alan Yates	221	7.7	+7.7
Majority		40	1.4	
Turnout		2,881		
Liberal Democrats gain from Conservative		Swing		

High Weald By-Election 6 May 2010
Party	Candidate	Votes	%	±%
Conservative	Simon McMenemy	1,670	55.9	+0.9
Liberal Democrats	Anne-Marie Lucraft	922	30.9	+15.0
Green	Paul Brown	395	13.2	−15.9
Majority		748	25.0	
Turnout		2,987		
Conservative hold		Swing		

Hurstpierpoint and Downs By-Election 6 May 2010
Party	Candidate	Votes	%	±%
Conservative	Simon McMenemy	2,362	56.1	+15.7
Liberal Democrats	Rodney Jackson	1,848	43.9	+17.1
Majority		514	12.2	
Turnout		4,210		
Conservative hold		Swing		

Haywards Heath Franklands By-Election 29 July 2010
Party	Candidate	Votes	%	±%
Conservative	John de Mierre	545	50.8	+1.7
Liberal Democrats	Raha Kazemi	464	43.3	+27.8
Independent	Colin Bates	63	5.9	+5.9
Majority		81	7.6	
Turnout		1,072		
Conservative hold		Swing		

=== 2011–2015 ===
Cuckfield By-Election 2 May 2013
Party	Candidate	Votes	%	±%
Conservative	Pete Bradbury	770	57.8	+9.6
Liberal Democrats	Stephen Blanch	429	32.2	−0.7
Labour	Stuart Gilboy	134	10.1	+3.1
Majority		341	25.6	
Turnout		1,333		
Conservative hold		Swing		

Haywards Heath Franklands By-Election 19 December 2013
Party	Candidate	Votes	%	±%
Conservative	Roderick Clarke	414	45.6	−8.0
UKIP	Howard Burrell	269	29.6	+29.6
Labour	Gregory Mountain	103	11.3	−0.8
Liberal Democrats	Anne-Marie Lucraft	91	10.0	−12.6
Green	Miranda Diboll	31	3.4	+3.4
Majority		145	16.0	
Turnout		908		
Conservative hold		Swing		

Haywards Heath Lucastes By-Election 23 October 2014
Party	Candidate	Votes	%	±%
Conservative	Geoffrey Rawlinson	524	56.4	+3.9
UKIP	Marc Montgomery	203	21.9	+14.8
Liberal Democrats	Nicholas Chapman	112	12.1	−10.9
Labour	Henry Fowler	90	9.7	+9.7
Majority		321	34.6	
Turnout		929		
Conservative hold		Swing		

Bolney By-Election 13 November 2014
Party	Candidate	Votes	%	±%
Conservative	John Allen	261	42.9	−24.2
UKIP	Anthony Williams	187	30.7	+17.4
Liberal Democrats	Simon Hicks	161	26.4	+6.9
Majority		74	12.2	
Turnout		609		
Conservative hold		Swing		

=== 2015–2019 ===
Bolney By-Election 4 May 2017
Party	Candidate	Votes	%	±%
Conservative	Judy Llewellyn-Burke	562	65.7	+13.5
Liberal Democrats	Rodney Jackson	201	23.5	−4.9
UKIP	Peter Hopgood	59	6.9	−12.5
Monster Raving Loony	Baron von Thunderclap	33	3.9	+3.9
Majority		361	42.2	
Turnout		855		
Conservative hold		Swing		

Burgess Hill Franklands By-Election 4 May 2017
Party	Candidate	Votes	%	±%
Conservative	Claire Fussell	757	44.4	+2.0
Liberal Democrats	Graham Allen	600	35.2	+13.6
Labour	Elaine Bolton	175	10.3	−1.3
UKIP	Chris French	91	5.3	−9.8
Green	Robert Duggan	81	4.8	−4.4
Majority		157	9.2	
Turnout		1,704		
Conservative hold		Swing		

Hassocks By-Election 8 June 2017 (2 seats)
Party	Candidate	Votes	%	±%
Conservative	Michelle Binks	2,023		
Liberal Democrats	Susan Hatton	1,931		
Conservative	Jessica Edwards	1,835		
Liberal Democrats	Gemma Stockford	1,536		
Labour	Will Matthews	1,042		
Labour	Harry Young	812		
Green	Viv Aloy	512		
Conservative hold		Swing		
Liberal Democrats gain from Conservative		Swing		

East Grinstead Imberhorne By-Election 26 October 2017
Party	Candidate	Votes	%	±%
Conservative	Rex Whittaker	540	58.5	−2.0
Liberal Democrats	Tim Martin	206	22.3	+22.3
Labour	David Wilbraham	110	11.9	−8.7
Independent	Ian Sanders	67	7.3	+7.3
Majority		334	36.2	
Turnout		923		
Conservative hold		Swing		

=== 2019–2023 ===
Copthorne and Worth By-Election 6 May 2021
Party	Candidate	Votes	%	±%
Conservative	Bruce Forbes	810	61.6	+26.7
Green	Matthew Brewin	284	21.6	+21.6
Independent	Norman Mockford	221	16.8	+16.8
Majority		526	40.0	
Turnout		1,315		
Conservative gain from Independent		Swing		

Ardingly and Balcombe By-Election 8 July 2021
Party	Candidate	Votes	%	±%
Green	Jenny Edwards	452	36.9	+13.6
Conservative	Lorraine Nunes-Carvalho	409	33.4	−5.6
Liberal Democrats	Ben Jerrit	340	27.8	+1.0
Independent	Carole Steggles	23	1.9	+1.9
Majority		43	3.5	
Turnout		1,224		
Green gain from Conservative		Swing		

Bolney By-Election 15 September 2022
Party	Candidate	Votes	%	±%
Conservative	Kristy Adams	301	50.6	+1.2
Liberal Democrats	Fiona Jackson	163	27.4	+8.3
Labour	Andrew Foster	66	11.1	+4.6
Monster Raving Loony	Baron von Thunderclap	30	5.0	+5.0
Green	Sue Kelly	28	4.7	−8.8
Independent	Norman Mockford	7	1.2	+1.2
Majority		138	23.2	
Turnout		595		
Conservative hold		Swing		

=== 2023–2027 ===
Hurstpierpoint By-Election 6 May 2021
Party	Candidate	Votes	%	±%
Liberal Democrats	Lyn Williams	1,211	48.7	
Conservative	Eliza Brazil	544	21.9	
Reform	Thomas Givons	414	16.6	
Green	James Stringfellow	319	12.8	
Majority		667	26.8	
Turnout		2,488		
Liberal Democrats hold		Swing		
