= Katy Bourne =

British police Commissioner

Katy Bourne OBE

Sussex Police and Crime Commissioner
- Incumbent
- Assumed office 22 November 2012
- Preceded by: Position established

Mid Sussex District Councillor for Cuckfield
- In office 2011–2013
- Preceded by: Edward King
- Succeeded by: Pete Bradbury

Personal details
- Born: 24 October 1964 (age 61)
- Party: Conservative
- Spouse: Kevin Bourne
- Children: 2
- Education: Roedean School
- Alma mater: Aberystwyth University

Katy Elizabeth Bourne OBE (born 24 October 1964) is a Conservative politician who has served as the Sussex Police and Crime Commissioner since winning the inaugural election in Sussex in November 2012. In 2016 and 2021 she was re-elected for her second and third terms in office. In May 2024 she was elected for a fourth term of office, securing 122,495 votes and a significantly narrowed majority of 23,000 on a turn-out of 24.2%.

After selling her leisure business in 2005, Bourne held a number of political and regional government roles from 2009 onwards. During this period, she served as a Mid Sussex District councillor. Bourne is the Conservative Party candidate for Mayor of Sussex and Brighton in the 2028 mayoral election.

== Early life and education ==
Katy Elizabeth Bourne was born on 24 October 1964. Aged 10 Bourne started studying at the independent Roedean School, in Sussex. She studied History at Aberystwyth University, where she chaired the Aberystwyth University Young Conservatives Society.

== Early career ==
Bourne founded a company that taught tap dancing, which she sold in 2005.

In 2008, became involved with the Conservative Women's Organisation, became one of three deputy chairmen in 2011, before serving as the national chairman until 2012. Around the same time, Bourne became a Mid Sussex District Councillor for Cuckfield, serving in the role from 2011 until 2013. She has served as a governor of Oriel High School in Crawley since 2008.

== Police and Crime Commissioner ==
On 15 November 2012, Bourne was elected as Police and Crime Commissioner for Sussex Police during the England and Wales Police and Crime Commissioner elections. She won the election with a majority of 24,426 over the Labour candidate. She was then appointed as director to the board of the national College of Policing in 2013.

One of her first initiatives as Police and Crime Commissioner, was the "tweetathon" on Twitter, with the BBC reporting that the reporting of domestic violence rose by more than 50% during a police Twitter campaign to highlight the issue of people not reporting the crime. The work in this field of crime, led to the Sussex police force becoming the first in England to be awarded a White Ribbon status, as part of the White Ribbon Campaign.

Between June 2012 and June 2013, Sussex crime statistics stated that overall crime had fallen by 7% in the county, however, some crimes such as commercial robbery had slight increases. The rise in burglaries led to the announcement of "Operation Magpie" in late June 2013, which introduced roadside checks and a voluntary tag for previous offenders, to rule them out of police investigations. As part of the strategy to tackle crime, Bourne set-up a fund worth £200,000, allowing community groups to apply for grants up to £5,000 to help prevent crime. In 2013, Bourne announced that recruitment had begun for 120 volunteer police in Sussex, and also 60 additional PCSOs.

In 2014, Bourne introduced a new study to measure public confidence in the Sussex Police. This included more than 2,000 young people aged between 15 and 24, which was reported by the BBC as a strategy to engage with young people by the Police force. During the same year, an initiative was launched to help victims of crime at a cost of £1.8 million. Bourne was also successful in securing £250,000 in extra funding for young victims of serious sexual crimes.

Bourne spoke at a meeting in Brighton about a number of issues in October 2014, including highway legislation. She suggested in passing that a cyclist could wear a form of identification, so the few that broke highway laws could be easily identified. The article lead to reporting by the British media that Borne had suggested that cyclists should use number plates. In an interview with The Guardian in late 2014, she stated "I believed that cyclists should have some form of identification. Now what that identification is, I don't know."

Throughout 2014 and 2015, Bourne called regular performance and accountability meetings (PAMs) to measure the performance of Sussex Police. A number of improvements were made to 101 non-emergency call handling and burglary dwelling performance across throughout the two reported years. Satisfaction of police forces in the United Kingdom fell to an average of 80.4%, with Sussex Police achieving 93% in the same period.

Sussex police also secured £1.1 million over a two-year period to transform the justice system in Sussex.

Sussex police announced in 2015 that it would be one of the first forces in the United Kingdom to implement an app to assist with the reporting of hate crimes. The app could be used to record evidence of hate crimes as they happen. During the speech at the launch of the app, Bourne stated that she hoped this would allow people to report more hate crimes, something the Sussex police force felt at the time was under-reported. In late 2015, it was announced that Bourne would be running for re-election as the Sussex Police and Crime Commissioner.

In late 2015, Bourne worked closely with the police force to introduce new measures to improve relationships with troubled young people, including the homeless. In early 2016, she worked alongside a number of senior politicians to trial an idea to reduce court costs in rural communities. The scheme would replace administrative hearings with virtual courts, allowing defendants, victims and witnesses to give evidence remotely to reduce costs. Reform's paper on digital justice, suggested such a scheme could result in savings of £27 million. She was also interviewed on BBC Breakfast in March 2016 about a pilot of a new scheme to tackle domestic violence. The pilot would provide one-to-one support in an attempt to change the behaviour of perpetrators.

Bourne was appointed Officer of the Order of the British Empire (OBE) in the 2019 Birthday Honours. In April 2021, Bourne was re-elected for a third term in the 2021 England and Wales police and crime commissioner elections. In May 2024, Bourne was re-elected for a fourth term as PCC for Sussex; she is the only person who has held that post since its creation in 2012. In July 2025, Bourne was selected as the Conservative Party candidate for Mayor of Sussex and Brighton in the 2026 mayoral election.

Following the government's announcement of plans to house 500 male asylum seekers in an army camp in Crowborough, in November 2025, Bourne attended a protest march which locals had organised against the plans. In January 2026, in relation to her attendance at the march, the Sussex Police and Crime Panel voted, in a motion tabled by Green Party councillor Paul Keene, in favour of censuring her for bringing her office into disrepute. Bourne, who said she was "so disgusted" at the motion, said that she will lodge a harassment complaint with the monitoring officer for the panel. Bourne said that her "job is to be the voice of the public on policing. That's exactly what I have been doing in this instance" and that she is "not going to be cancelled just because I am saying something that is absolutely my job to do."

Pegasus Partnership

Katy convened and chaired the Pegasus Partnership, a United Kingdom public–private initiative established in October 2023 to combat organised retail crime through enhanced cooperation between law enforcement agencies, the Association of Police and Crime Commissioners (APCC), and major retailers. This was introduced to tackle a recent rise in shoplifting and organised retail crime, which was often driven by coordinated criminal groups working across multiple regions. Retailers highlighted difficulties in sharing information effectively with police forces, resulting in fragmented intelligence about offenders and criminal networks. At its inception, 13 major UK retailers including such as Tesco and Sainsbury’s committed funding to support the initiative.

A central component of Pegasus is its support for a dedicated national policing function within Opal, the National Police Chiefs’ Council (NPCC) intelligence unit for serious organised acquisitive crime.

Since the unit was launched in May 2024, it has supported 203 referrals from retailers and police forces, resulting in 84 operations being carried out to tackle organised crime gangs targeting the retail sector.

A total of 605 offenders have been identified and tens of thousands of pounds worth of stolen goods recovered, resulting in 257 arrests, 118 years’ worth of imprisonments and 22 deportations. There has been a 73% reduction in offending by organised crime groups referred into the unit; and more than 118 years’ worth of prison sentences have been handed out.

By 2026, the Pegasus Partnership had been integrated into broader national efforts to tackle business and retail crime, with its operational elements continuing under initiatives such as the National Business Crime Centre’s programmes.

Personal life

Bourne resides in Mid Sussex with her husband Kevin, who served in the Falklands War as a 19-year-old artilleryman. She has two adult sons and two adult step-daughters.

== Electoral performance ==
=== Sussex Police and Crime Commissioner ===
2024 Sussex Police and Crime Commissioner election
Party	Candidate	Votes	%	±%
Conservative	Katy Bourne	122,495	39.0	–8.3
Labour	Paul Richards	99,502	31.7	+13.1
Liberal Democrats	Jamie Bennett	48,923	15.6	+1.6
Green	Johnathan Kent	43,105	13.7	+0.3
Turnout		314,025	24.4	–11.3
Conservative hold				

2021 Sussex Police and Crime Commissioner election
Party	Candidate	1st round		2nd round			1st round votesTransfer votes, 2nd round
Party	Candidate	Total	Of round	Transfers	Total	Of round	1st round votesTransfer votes, 2nd round
Conservative	Katy Bourne	214,523	47.2%	30,287	244,810		
Labour	Paul Richards	84,736	18.7%	43,523	128,259		
Liberal Democrats	Jamie Bennett	63,271	13.9%				
Green	Kahina Bouhassane	60,781	13.4%				
Independent	Roy Williams	30,408	6.7%				
Turnout		453,719	35.8%				
Conservative hold							

2016 Sussex Police and Crime Commissioner election
Party	Candidate	1st round		2nd round			1st round votesTransfer votes, 2nd round
Party	Candidate	Total	Of round	Transfers	Total	Of round	1st round votesTransfer votes, 2nd round
Conservative	Katy Bourne	114,570	41.8%	24,765	139,335		
Labour	Michael Jones	61,017	22.3%	25,375	86,392		
UKIP	Patrick Lowe	43,075	15.7%				
Liberal Democrats	James Walsh	29,550	10.8%				
Green	James Doyle	26,038	9.5%				
Turnout		274,250	22.5%				
Conservative hold							

2012 Sussex Police and Crime Commissioner election
Party	Candidate	1st round		2nd round			1st round votesTransfer votes, 2nd round
Party	Candidate	Total	Of round	Transfers	Total	Of round	1st round votesTransfer votes, 2nd round
Conservative	Katy Bourne	59,635	32%	20,393	80,028		
Labour	Godfrey Daniel	40,765	22%	14,837	55,602		
Independent	Ian Chisnall	38,930	21%				
UKIP	Tony Armstrong	29,327	15%				
Liberal Democrats	David Rogers	20,579	11%				
Turnout		189,236	15.3%				
Conservative win							

=== Mid Sussex District Council ===
2011 District Council election: Cuckfield (2 seats)
Party	Candidate	Votes	%	±%
Conservative	Robert Salisbury	1,142		
Conservative	Katy Bourne	1,126		
Liberal Democrats	Stephen Blanch	779		
Liberal Democrats	Paul Lucraft	472		
Green	Gillian Maher	282		
Labour	Sarah Moss	165		
Turnout				
Conservative hold				
Conservative hold				

2007 District Council election: Haywards Heath Ashenground (2 seats)
Party	Candidate	Votes	%	±%
Liberal Democrats	Richard Bates	941		
Liberal Democrats	Brian Hall	923		
Conservative	Katy Bourne	597		
Conservative	Benedict White	536		
Turnout				
Liberal Democrats hold				
Liberal Democrats hold				
