= 2028 Sussex and Brighton mayoral election =

Proposed mayoral election

- 4 May 2028
Incumbent Mayor
Position established

The 2028 Sussex and Brighton mayoral election is due to be held on 4 May 2028, postponed from an originally scheduled date of 7 May 2026, to elect the inaugural mayor of Sussex and Brighton who will lead the Sussex and Brighton Combined Authority. It will be held at the same time as other mayoral elections in England.

== Candidates ==
The Conservative Party, Liberal Democrats, Green Party, Labour Party and Reform UK have all announced candidates.

=== Conservative Party ===
The Conservative Party selected Katy Bourne as their candidate in July 2025. She has been the Sussex Police and Crime Commissioner since 2012.

=== Green Party ===
In October 2025, the Green Party of England and Wales announced that their deputy leader Rachel Millward, had been selected as their candidate. Millward has officially been the deputy leader of Wealden District Council since May 2025, although in practice she co-leads the council alongside the Liberal Democrat leader James Partridge, with the two swapping official titles annually since 2023.

=== Independent candidates ===
Martin Webb initially stood as an independent candidate but withdrew in September 2026. Webb is an entrepreneur and former business columnist for The Sunday Telegraph.

=== Labour Party ===
The Labour Party announced that Caroline Baxter had been selected as their candidate in November 2025. Baxter represents Central ward on Worthing Borough Council.

=== Liberal Democrats ===
The Liberal Democrats announced that Ben Dempsey had been selected as their candidate in September 2025. Dempsey was a councillor for Hassocks ward on Mid Sussex District Council between 2019 and 2023, and finished in second place in the East Grinstead and Uckfield constituency at the 2024 general election.

=== Reform UK ===
Reform UK announced Paul Linehan as their candidate in November, noting his background as a former soldier, bus driver, police officer and university lecturer, and his current roles as a business owner and West Sussex county councillor.
