= 2019 Mid Sussex District Council election =

2019 UK local government election

- 2 May 2019

All 54 seats to Mid Sussex District Council 28 seats needed for a majority

	First party	Second party
Party	Conservative	Liberal Democrats
Last election	54 seats, 57.7%	0 seats, 12.5%
Seats won	34	13
Seat change	▼20	▲13
Popular vote	30,942	23,356
Percentage	40.0%	30.2%
Swing	▼17.5%	▲17.7%
	Third party	Fourth party
Party	Independent	Green
Last election	0 seats, 1.5%	0 seats, 8.5%
Seats won	4	3
Seat change	▲4	▲3
Popular vote	6,320	8,845
Percentage	8.2%	11.4%
Swing	▲6.7%	▲2.9%
- Winner of each seat at the 2019 Mid Sussex District Council election
Council control before election
Conservative
Council control after election
Conservative

The 2019 Mid Sussex District Council election took place on Thursday 2 May 2019 to elect members of Mid Sussex District Council in West Sussex, England.

After the election, the composition of the council was as follows:

- Conservative 34
- Liberal Democrat 13
- Green 3
- Independent 4

== Summary ==
=== Election result ===
2019 Mid Sussex District Council election
Party	Candidates	Seats	Gains	Losses	Net gain/loss	Seats %	Votes %	Votes	+/−
Conservative	54	34	0	20	▼20	63.0	40.0	30,942	–17.5
Liberal Democrats	34	13	13	0	▲13	24.1	30.2	23,356	+17.7
Independent	9	4	4	0	▲4	7.4	8.2	6,320	+6.7
Green	18	3	3	0	▲3	5.6	11.4	8,845	+2.9
Labour	27	0	0	0	Steady	0.0	9.1	6,997	–2.8
UKIP	5	0	0	0	Steady	0.0	1.1	826	–6.7

== Ward results ==
=== Ardingly and Balcombe ===
Ardingly and Balcombe
Party	Candidate	Votes	%	±%
Conservative	Gary Marsh	684	44.4	
Conservative	Andrew MacNaughton	642	41.7	
Liberal Democrats	Henry Le Fleming	470	30.5	
Green	Gillian Maher	409	26.5	
Liberal Democrats	Peter Cox	404	26.2	
Labour	Micah Roberts	192	12.5	
Turnout		1,567	33.75	
Rejected ballots		26		
Registered electors		4,617		
Conservative hold				
Conservative hold				

=== Ashurst Wood ===
Ashurst Wood
Party	Candidate	Votes	%	±%
Conservative	John Belsey	546	69.9	−2.1
Liberal Democrats	James Thompson	235	30.1	+30.1
Majority		311	39.8	
Turnout		806	37.9	
Rejected ballots		24		
Registered electors		2,129		
Conservative hold		Swing		

=== Bolney ===
Bolney
Party	Candidate	Votes	%	±%
Conservative	Judith Llewellyn-Burke	420	49.4	−2.8
Liberal Democrats	Nigel Cook	162	19.1	−9.3
Green	Susan Kelly	115	13.5	+13.5
UKIP	Peter Hopgood	98	11.5	−7.9
Labour	David Jones	55	6.5	+6.5
Majority		258	30.4	
Turnout		854	39	
Rejected ballots		4		
Registered electors		2,187		
Conservative hold		Swing		

=== Burgess Hill Dunstall ===
Burgess Hill Dunstall
Party	Candidate	Votes	%	±%
Conservative	Emma Coe-Gunnell White	550	41.6	
Conservative	Samantha Smith	503	38.0	
Green	John Fernandez	502	38.0	
Liberal Democrats	Stuart Condie	475	35.9	
Labour	Simon Hayward	202	15.3	
Labour	Pamela Haigh	168	12.7	
Majority				
Turnout		1,343	33.84	
Rejected ballots		21		
Registered electors		3,987		
Conservative hold				
Conservative hold				

=== Burgess Hill Franklands ===
Burgess Hill Franklands
Party	Candidate	Votes	%	±%
Liberal Democrats	Janice Henwood	1,054	60.9	
Liberal Democrats	Graham Allen	1,021	59.0	
Conservative	Richard Cherry	528	30.5	
Conservative	Andrew Landriani	507	29.3	
Labour	Gemma Bolton	178	10.3	
Labour	David Chalkley	115	6.6	
Turnout		1,769	43.86	
Rejected ballots		38		
Registered electors		4,047		
Liberal Democrats gain from Conservative				
Liberal Democrats gain from Conservative				

=== Burgess Hill Leylands ===
Burgess Hill Leylands
Party	Candidate	Votes	%	±%
Liberal Democrats	Simon Hicks	800	54.6	
Green	Anne Miles-Eves	745	50.8	
Conservative	Prudence Moore	415	28.3	
Conservative	Elizabeth Kelly	334	22.8	
UKIP	Stephen Curryer	181	12.3	
Labour	Tara Greatorex	133	9.1	
Labour	Linda Greatorex	125	8.5	
Turnout		1,472	39.86	
Rejected ballots		6		
Registered electors		3,695		
Liberal Democrats gain from Conservative				
Green gain from Conservative				

=== Burgess Hill Meeds ===
Burgess Hill Meeds
Party	Candidate	Votes	%	±%
Liberal Democrats	Robert Eggleston	818	52.2	
Liberal Democrats	Tofojjul Hussain	657	42.0	
Conservative	Anne Jones	435	27.8	
Conservative	Adam White	369	23.6	
Labour	Elaine Bolton	249	15.9	
UKIP	Christopher French	194	12.4	
Labour	Ian Greatorex	170	10.9	
Turnout		1,581	41.42	
Rejected ballots		15		
Registered electors		3,818		
Liberal Democrats gain from Conservative				
Liberal Democrats gain from Conservative				

=== Burgess Hill St. Andrew's ===
Burgess Hill St. Andrew's
Party	Candidate	Votes	%	±%
Green	Matthew Cornish	686	46.2	
Liberal Democrats	Roger Cartwright	673	45.4	
Conservative	Colin Holden	476	32.1	
Labour	Tony Balsdon	442	29.8	
Conservative	Raymond Smith	402	27.1	
Turnout		1,511	34.72	
Rejected ballots		27		
Registered electors		4,308		
Green gain from Conservative				
Liberal Democrats gain from Conservative				

=== Burgess Hill Victoria ===
Burgess Hill Victoria
Party	Candidate	Votes	%	±%
Independent	Peter Chapman	950	62.3	
Liberal Democrats	Lee Gibbs	686	45.0	
Conservative	Mandy Thomas-Atkin	346	22.7	
Conservative	Christopher Thomas-Atkin	337	22.1	
Labour	Richard Neville	267	17.5	
Turnout		1,541	34.94	
Rejected ballots		16		
Registered electors		4,437		
Independent gain from Conservative				
Liberal Democrats gain from Conservative				

=== Copthorne and Worth ===
Copthorne and Worth
Party	Candidate	Votes	%	±%
Independent	Paul Budgen	903	64.9	
Independent	Christopher Phillips	671	48.2	
Conservative	Anthony Dorey	485	34.9	
Conservative	Trevor Hodsdon	445	32.0	
Turnout		1,410	35.88	
Rejected ballots		19		
Registered electors		3,943		
Independent gain from Conservative				
Independent gain from Conservative				

=== Crawley Down and Turners Hill ===
Crawley Down and Turners Hill
Party	Candidate	Votes	%	±%
Independent	Ian Gibson	1,552	72.2	
Conservative	Roger Webb	831	38.6	
Conservative	Phillip Coote	647	30.1	
Green	Sean Betts	623	29.0	
Conservative	Bruce Forbes	529	24.6	
Turnout		2,170	37.51	
Rejected ballots		19		
Registered electors		5,800		
Independent gain from Conservative				
Conservative hold				
Conservative hold				

=== Cuckfield ===
Cuckfield
Party	Candidate	Votes	%	±%
Conservative	Peter Bradbury	720	44.1	
Conservative	Robert Salisbury	674	41.2	
Liberal Democrats	Josephine Notaras	571	34.9	
Liberal Democrats	Stephen Blanch	536	32.8	
Green	Catherine Edminson	402	24.6	
Independent	Benedict White	162	9.9	
Turnout		1,652	37.55	
Rejected ballots		18		
Registered electors		4,406		
Conservative hold				
Conservative hold				

=== East Grinstead Ashplats ===
East Grinstead Ashplats
Party	Candidate	Votes	%	±%
Conservative	Elizabeth Bennett	894	71.9	
Conservative	Margaret Belsey	807	64.9	
Labour	Alice Tyrrell	299	24.1	
Labour	Martin Jeremiah	292	23.5	
Turnout		1,335	29.69	
Rejected ballots		92		
Registered electors		4,511		
Conservative hold				
Conservative hold				

=== East Grinstead Baldwins ===
East Grinstead Baldwins
Party	Candidate	Votes	%	±%
Conservative	Julie Mockford	679	56.5	
Conservative	Norman Webster	506	42.1	
Independent	Norman Mockford	424	35.3	
Liberal Democrats	Fathi Tarada	390	32.5	
Turnout		1,220	30.41	
Rejected ballots		19		
Registered electors		4,043		
Conservative hold				
Conservative hold				

=== East Grinstead Herontye ===
East Grinstead Herontye
Party	Candidate	Votes	%	±%
Conservative	Adam Peacock	Unopposed		
Conservative	Dick Sweatman	Unopposed		
Majority				
Turnout				
Conservative hold				
Conservative hold				

=== East Grinstead Imberhorne ===
East Grinstead Imberhorne
Party	Candidate	Votes	%	±%
Conservative	Heidi Brunsdon	Unopposed		
Conservative	Rex Whittaker	Unopposed		
Majority				
Turnout				
Conservative hold				
Conservative hold				

=== East Grinstead Town ===
East Grinstead Town
Party	Candidate	Votes	%	±%
Conservative	Neville Walker	574	47.6	
Conservative	John Dabell	537	44.5	
Independent	Stuart Pilbrow	390	32.3	
Labour	Tess Fensterheim	266	22.0	
Labour	David Wilbraham	255	21.1	
UKIP	Ian Simcock	167	13.8	
Turnout		1,229	29.12	
Rejected ballots		22		
Registered electors		4,200		
Conservative hold				
Conservative hold				

=== Hassocks ===
Hassocks
Party	Candidate	Votes	%	±%
Liberal Democrats	Susan Hatton	2,170	65.2	
Liberal Democrats	Benedict Dempsey	1,721	51.7	
Liberal Democrats	Alexander Sparasci	1,606	48.2	
Conservative	Michelle Binks	868	26.1	
Conservative	Alexander Simmons	717	21.5	
Conservative	Helen Bedford	683	20.5	
Labour	Victoria Standfast	510	15.3	
Green	Moira Monteith	449	13.5	
Labour	Nicholas Owens	423	12.7	
Labour	David Hammond	406	12.2	
Turnout		3,352	53	
Rejected ballots		23		
Registered electors		6,330		
Liberal Democrats gain from Conservative				
Liberal Democrats gain from Conservative				
Liberal Democrats gain from Conservative				

=== Haywards Heath Ashenground ===
Haywards Heath Ashenground
Party	Candidate	Votes	%	±%
Liberal Democrats	Richard Bates	568	38.4	
Conservative	Anne Boutrup	521	35.2	
Liberal Democrats	Stephanie Inglesfield	505	34.1	
Conservative	Howard Mundin	471	31.8	
Green	Matthew Brewin	342	23.1	
Labour	Dean Finch	325	21.9	
Turnout		1,511	36.4	
Rejected ballots		30		
Registered electors		4,155		
Liberal Democrats gain from Conservative				
Conservative hold				

=== Haywards Heath Bentswood ===
Haywards Heath Bentswood
Party	Candidate	Votes	%	±%
Conservative	Stephen Hillier	588	43.3	
Conservative	Rachel Cromie	546	40.2	
Liberal Democrats	Leila Wilson	419	30.9	
Liberal Democrats	Hugh Faithfull	372	27.4	
Green	Jack Langley	363	26.8	
UKIP	Howard Burrell	186	13.7	
Turnout		1,382	31.13	
Rejected ballots		25		
Registered electors		4,441		
Conservative hold				
Conservative hold				

=== Haywards Heath Heath ===
Haywards Heath Heath
Party	Candidate	Votes	%	±%
Conservative	Sandra Ellis	718	47.0	
Conservative	Clive Laband	612	40.0	
Green	Richard Nicholson	501	32.8	
Liberal Democrats	Susan Knight	376	24.6	
Labour	Sarah Greenslade	330	21.6	
Liberal Democrats	Riikka Jokelainen	326	21.3	
Turnout		1,584	36	
Rejected ballots		55		
Registered electors		4,397		
Conservative hold				
Conservative hold				

=== Haywards Heath Franklands ===
Haywards Heath Franklands
Party	Candidate	Votes	%	±%
Conservative	Roderick Clarke	598	51.2	
Conservative	Michael Pulfer	514	44.0	
Liberal Democrats	James France	310	26.6	
Green	David Woolley	299	25.6	
Liberal Democrats	Tristan Inglesfield	264	22.6	
Labour	Thomas Martyn	193	16.5	
Turnout		1,206	29.5	
Rejected ballots		39		
Registered electors		4,092		
Conservative hold				
Conservative hold				

=== Haywards Heath Lucastes ===
Haywards Heath Lucastes
Party	Candidate	Votes	%	±%
Conservative	Diana De Mierre	808	47.6	
Conservative	James Knight	762	44.9	
Liberal Democrats	Alison Rees	512	30.2	
Liberal Democrats	Nicholas Chapman	474	27.9	
Green	Allan Murray	410	24.2	
Labour	Paul Kenny	275	16.2	
Turnout		1,727	33.6	
Rejected ballots		30		
Registered electors		5,144		
Conservative hold				
Conservative hold				

=== High Weald ===
High Weald
Party	Candidate	Votes	%	±%
Green	Paul Brown	751	49.8	
Conservative	Linda Stockwell	576	38.2	
Conservative	Lorraine Nunes-Carvalho	519	34.4	
Independent	Christopher Hersey	483	32.1	
Green	Jonathan Lewis	463	30.7	
Turnout		1,517	39.19	
Rejected ballots		10		
Registered electors		3,873		
Green gain from Conservative				
Conservative hold				

=== Hurstpierpoint and Downs ===
Hurstpierpoint and Downs
Party	Candidate	Votes	%	±%
Liberal Democrats	Alison Bennett	1,215	47.8	
Liberal Democrats	Rodney Jackson	967	38.0	
Conservative	Colin Trumble	933	36.7	
Conservative	John Wilkinson	928	36.5	
Conservative	Anthony Watts Williams	795	31.3	
Liberal Democrats	Paul Herve	739	29.1	
Green	Lesley Burdett	608	23.9	
Green	Nicholas Dearden	424	16.7	
Labour	Norah O'Hare	349	13.7	
Labour	Fred Bor Burns	239	9.4	
Turnout		2,585	40.56	
Rejected ballots		42		
Registered electors		6,349		
Liberal Democrats gain from Conservative				
Liberal Democrats gain from Conservative				
Conservative hold				

=== Lindfield ===
Lindfield
Party	Candidate	Votes	%	±%
Conservative	Andrew Lea	1,011	39.8	
Conservative	Jonathan Ash-Edwards	985	38.8	
Conservative	Anthea Lea	967	38.1	
Independent	Margaret Hersey	785	30.9	
Liberal Democrats	Anne-Marie Lucraft	753	29.7	
Green	Peter Wemyss-Gorman	753	29.7	
Liberal Democrats	Paul Lucraft	624	24.6	
Liberal Democrats	Cavan Wood	483	19.0	
Labour	Linda Grace	285	11.2	
Labour	Lisa Desbruslais	254	10.0	
Turnout		2,551	42.23	
Rejected ballots		12		
Registered electors		6,036		
Conservative hold				
Conservative hold				
Conservative hold				

== Changes 2019–2023 ==
- By December 2021: Julie Mockford (East Grinstead Baldwins), elected as a Conservative, left the party to sit as an independent.

=== By-elections ===
==== Copthorne and Worth ====
The by-election was triggered by independent councillor Paul Budgen standing down from the council; it was originally due to be held on 16 April 2020 but was postponed because of the COVID-19 pandemic.

Copthorne and Worth by-election, 6 May 2021
Party	Candidate	Votes	%	±%
Conservative	Bruce Forbes	810	61.6	
Green	Matthew Brewin	284	21.6	
Independent	Norman Mockford	221	16.8	
Majority		526	40.0	
Turnout		1,323	33.22	
Rejected ballots		6		
Registered electors		3,982		
Conservative gain from Independent		Swing		

==== Ardingly and Balcombe ====
The by-election was held following the death of councillor Andrew Macnaughton, who had served continuously for 34 years.

Ardingly and Balcombe by-election, 8 July 2021
Party	Candidate	Votes	%	±%
Green	Jenny Edwards	452	36.9	
Conservative	Lorraine Nunes-Carvalho	409	33.4	
Liberal Democrats	Ben Jerrit	340	27.8	
Independent	Carole Steggles	23	1.9	
Majority		43	3.5	
Turnout		1,225	24.8	
Rejected ballots		1		
Registered electors		4,942		
Green gain from Conservative		Swing		

==== Bolney ====
The by-election was called following the resignation of councillor Judith Llewellyn-Burke.

Bolney by-election, 15 September 2022
Party	Candidate	Votes	%	±%
Conservative	Kristy Adams	301	50.6	+1.2
Liberal Democrats	Fiona Jackson	163	27.4	+8.3
Labour	Andrew Foster	66	11.1	+4.6
Monster Raving Loony	Baron von Thunderclap	30	5.0	New
Green	Sue Kelly	28	4.7	−8.8
Independent	Norman Mockford	7	1.2	New
Majority		138	23.2	
Turnout		596	26.5	
Rejected ballots		1		
Registered electors		2,248		
Conservative hold		Swing	3.6	
