= Sussex and Brighton Strategic Authority =

Strategic authority and combined county authority in England

Sussex & Brighton Strategic Authority
- Logo

- Area covered by the Sussex and Brighton Strategic Authority

Type
- Type: Combined county authority and strategic authority of Sussex

History
- Founded: 26 March 2026

Leadership
- Chair: Bella Sankey, Labour since 1 July 2026

Elections
- Voting system: Directly elected mayor
- Next election: May 2028

Meeting place
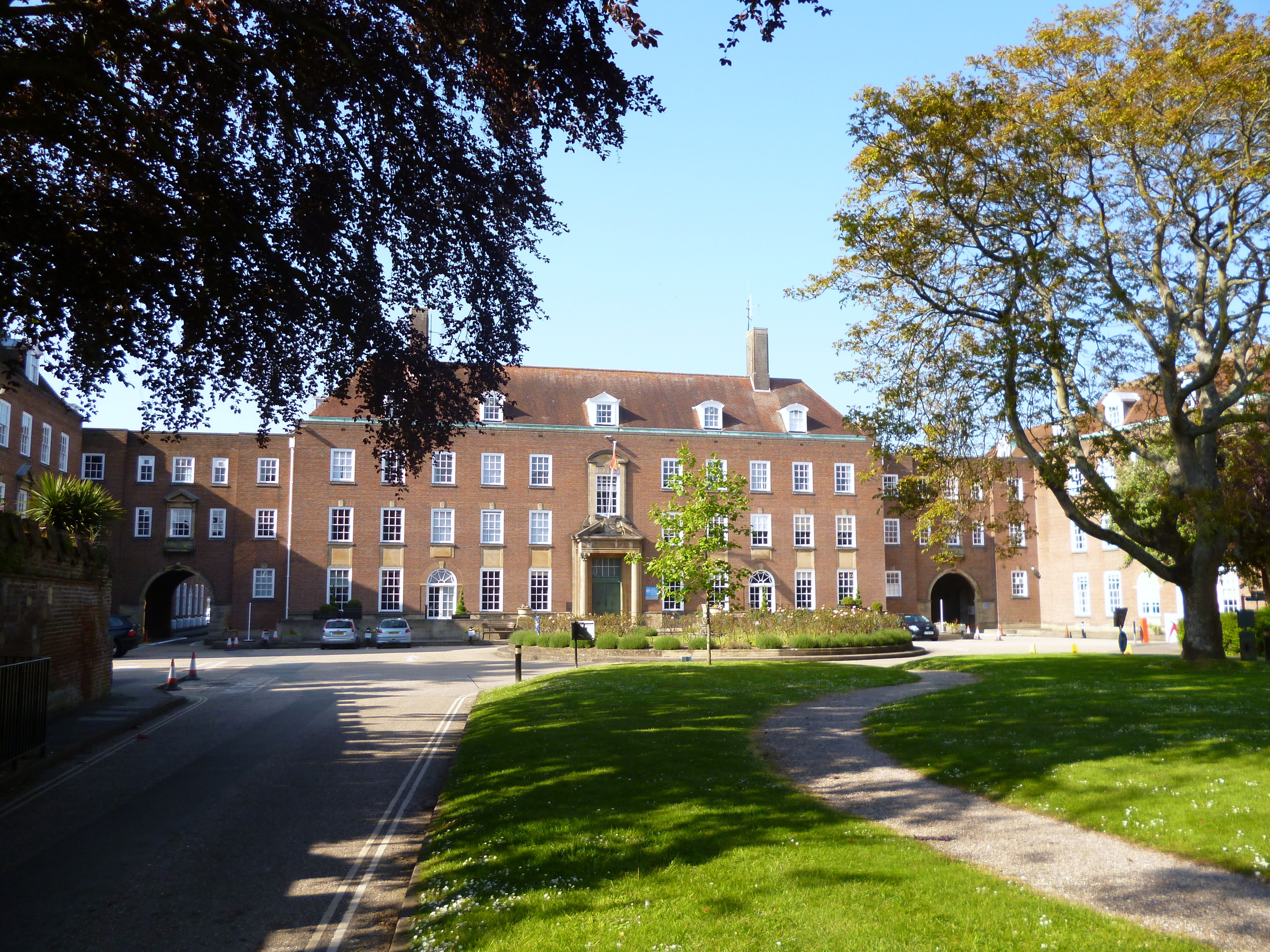
- County Hall, Chichester

Website
- www.sussexandbrighton-cca.gov.uk

The Sussex and Brighton Strategic Authority (SBSA) (Note: Legally the Sussex and Brighton Combined County Authority) is a strategic authority for the ceremonial counties of East Sussex and West Sussex in south-east England. Covering the historic county of Sussex, it was established as a combined county authority on 26 March 2026. Its creation is linked to the English Devolution and Community Empowerment Act 2026, first outlined in a white paper in 2024 by the Starmer ministry. SBSA will have a directly elected mayor who will be a member of the Mayoral Council for England and the Council of the Nations and Regions. The first mayoral election is scheduled for May 2028.

== Background ==
Formed in the 5th century as the Kingdom of Sussex in the region largely inhabited by the Romano-British Regni tribe, Sussex later became a county within England. By the 12th century, Sussex was administered as several districts known as Rapes and in the 1890s, although considered a single county, separate county councils for east and west, as well as independent county boroughs for its larger towns were established within it. In 1974 Sussex lost its status as a ceremonial county and separate posts of Lord Lieutenant were established for East and West Sussex. Sussex continues to be recognised as a single county or region for many purposes and in the 21st century a county day and a flag were established. There were calls for the devolution of powers from Whitehall to Sussex from former MP Lloyd Russell-Moyle and historian Chris Hare, while cultural historian Peter Brandon referred to the current division of Sussex into east and west as 'unnatural'.

The post of Sussex Police and Crime Commissioner was established in 2012 and in 2014 the Greater Brighton Economic Board was established to deliver strategic economic improvements across central parts of the region. Following contradicting proposals to establish devolved authorities for the Greater Brighton City Region and for East Sussex, West Sussex and Surrey (but not Brighton and Hove), a 2024 report for the Institute for Government recommended a single mayor for the Sussex region on the grounds of its economic geography, cultural identity and existing administrations, such as Sussex Police. At the same time, council leaders across Sussex came together to form a new partnership, following which Sussex was invited to join the UK Government's Devolution Priority Programme.

== Naming ==
The Government has announced that the authority will be called the Sussex and Brighton Combined County Authority. Since Brighton is already part of the historic county of Sussex, the name alludes to the three top-level authorities at its establishment, i.e. East Sussex, West Sussex, and Brighton and Hove.

The name has been criticised as clumsy, diminishing to the historic integrity of Sussex, with calls from both East and West Sussex county councils for the name to simply be “Sussex”, as a stronger choice for the long term.

Upon launch, the authority adopted the corporate name Sussex and Brighton Strategic Authority.

== Membership ==
=== Constituent local authorities ===
Initial constituent membership:

- Brighton and Hove City Council
- East Sussex County Council
- West Sussex County Council

Expected constituent membership from April 2028:

- TBD (awaiting Secretary of State's decision on further technical consultation)

=== Board members ===
The combined county authority board consists of the following representatives:

Name	Membership	Nominating authority
Vacant until May 2028	Mayor of Sussex and Brighton, constituent	Direct election
Bella Sankey	Constituent	Brighton and Hove City Council
Jacob Taylor	Constituent	Brighton and Hove City Council
Andy Woolley	Constituent	East Sussex County Council
Pete Morley	Constituent	East Sussex County Council
Jay Mercer	Constituent	West Sussex County Council
Nicholas Russell	Constituent	West Sussex County Council

In July 2026, the board decided that it would not appoint a single interim chairperson for the period until the mayor is in post, but members will take turns to chair meetings instead.

== See also ==
- Devolution in the United Kingdom § England
