= 2011 Mid Sussex District Council election =

2011 UK local government election

- 5 May 2011

All 54 seats to Mid Sussex District Council 28 seats needed for a majority

	First party	Second party	Third party
Party	Conservative	Liberal Democrats	Labour
Last election	30 seats, 44.4%	23 seats, 39.4%	1 seat, 3.1%
Seats won	45	8	1
Seat change	▲15	▼15	Steady
Popular vote	26,865	16,778	3,710
Percentage	50.8%	31.7%	7.0%
Swing	▲6.4%	▼7.7%	▲3.9%
- Winner of each seat at the 2011 Mid Sussex District Council election
Council control before election
Conservative
Council control after election
Conservative

The 2011 Mid Sussex District Council election took place on 5 May 2011 to elect members to Mid Sussex District Council in England. It was held on the same day as other local elections.

== Results summary ==
2011 Mid Sussex District Council election
Party	Seats	Gains	Losses	Net gain/loss	Seats %	Votes %	Votes	+/−
Conservative	45	15	0	▲15	83.3	50.8	26,865	+6.4
Liberal Democrats	8	0	15	▼15	14.8	31.7	16,778	–7.7
Labour	1	0	0	Steady	1.9	7.0	3,710	+3.9
Green	0	0	0	Steady	0.0	6.0	3,195	–0.5
UKIP	0	0	0	Steady	0.0	3.2	1,677	+2.8
Independent	0	0	0	Steady	0.0	1.2	648	–5.0

== Results by ward ==
=== Ardingly and Balcombe ===
Ardingly and Balcombe (2 seats)
Party	Candidate	Votes	%	±%
Conservative	Gary Marsh	1,233		
Conservative	Andrew MacNaughton	1,104		
Liberal Democrats	Heather Ross	556		
Turnout				
Conservative hold				
Conservative hold				

=== Ashurst Wood ===
Ashurst Wood
Party	Candidate	Votes	%	±%
Liberal Democrats	Stephen Barnett	529		
Conservative	Gary Sillitoe	480		
Turnout		1,009		
Liberal Democrats hold				

=== Bolney ===
Bolney
Party	Candidate	Votes	%	±%
Conservative	Sue Seward	745		
Liberal Democrats	Cavan Wood	217		
UKIP	Peter Hopgood	148		
Turnout		1,110		
Conservative hold				

=== Burgess Hill Dunstall ===
Burgess Hill Dunstall (2 seats)
Party	Candidate	Votes	%	±%
Conservative	Andrew Barrett-Miles	1,075		
Conservative	Jacqui Landriani	989		
Liberal Democrats	Mike Bliss	507		
Turnout				
Conservative hold				
Conservative hold				

=== Burgess Hill Franklands ===
Burgess Hill Franklands (2 seats)
Party	Candidate	Votes	%	±%
Conservative	Ian Simpson	1,222		
Conservative	Ginny Heard	962		
Liberal Democrats	Graham Allen	938		
Turnout				
Conservative gain from Liberal Democrats				
Conservative hold				

=== Burgess Hill Leylands ===
Burgess Hill Leylands (2 seats)
Party	Candidate	Votes	%	±%
Conservative	Pru Moore	819		
Conservative	Cherry Catharine	730		
Liberal Democrats	Peter Barton	611		
Liberal Democrats	Simon Hicks	611		
Green	Anne Eves	247		
Turnout				
Conservative hold				
Conservative gain from Liberal Democrats				

=== Burgess Hill Meeds ===
Burgess Hill Meeds (2 seats)
Party	Candidate	Votes	%	±%
Liberal Democrats	Kathleen Dumbovic	732		
Conservative	Anne Jones	716		
Liberal Democrats	Janice Henwood	689		
Conservative	Chris Smith	597		
UKIP	Chris French	177		
Turnout				
Liberal Democrats hold				
Conservative gain from Liberal Democrats				

=== Burgess Hill St Andrews ===
Burgess Hill St Andrews (2 seats)
Party	Candidate	Votes	%	±%
Liberal Democrats	Denis Jones	818		
Liberal Democrats	Graham Knight	724		
Conservative	Kirsty Page	662		
Conservative	Jeremy Catharine	617		
Turnout				
Liberal Democrats hold				
Liberal Democrats hold				

=== Burgess Hill Victoria ===
Burgess Hill Victoria (2 seats)
Party	Candidate	Votes	%	±%
Conservative	Mandy Thomas-Atkin	817		
Conservative	Emily White	703		
Liberal Democrats	Roger Cartwright	682		
Liberal Democrats	Malcolm Stephens	618		
Green	Victoria Grimmett	280		
UKIP	Kevin Walker	183		
Turnout				
Conservative hold				
Conservative gain from Liberal Democrats				

=== Copthorne and Worth ===
Copthorne and Worth (2 seats)
Party	Candidate	Votes	%	±%
Conservative	Mike Livesey	1,258		
Conservative	Edward Matthews	843		
Labour	Timothy Cornell	291		
Liberal Democrats	Eileen Balsdon	237		
Turnout				
Conservative hold				
Conservative hold				

=== Crawley Down and Turners Hill ===
Crawley Down and Turners Hill (3 seats)
Party	Candidate	Votes	%	±%
Conservative	Phillip Coote	1,481		
Conservative	Bruce Forbes	1,379		
Conservative	Neville Walker	1,212		
Liberal Democrats	Bill Morrison	453		
Labour	Alison Cornell	449		
UKIP	Brian Bezzant	339		
UKIP	Eric Saunders	320		
Turnout				
Conservative gain from Liberal Democrats				
Conservative gain from Liberal Democrats				
Conservative gain from Liberal Democrats				

=== Cuckfield ===
Cuckfield (2 seats)
Party	Candidate	Votes	%	±%
Conservative	Robert Salisbury	1,142		
Conservative	Katy Bourne	1,126		
Liberal Democrats	Stephen Blanch	779		
Liberal Democrats	Paul Lucraft	472		
Green	Gillian Maher	282		
Labour	Sarah Moss	165		
Turnout				
Conservative hold				
Conservative hold				

=== East Grinstead Ashplats ===
East Grinstead Ashplats (2 seats)
Party	Candidate	Votes	%	±%
Conservative	Liz Bennett	1,037		
Conservative	Peter Reed	941		
Liberal Democrats	Jacqueline Beckford	504		
Liberal Democrats	Paul Johnson	483		
Labour	Alice Tyrrell	233		
Turnout				
Conservative hold				
Conservative hold				

=== East Grinstead Baldwins ===
East Grinstead Baldwins (2 seats)
Party	Candidate	Votes	%	±%
Conservative	Margaret Belsey	887		
Conservative	Norman Webster	837		
Liberal Democrats	Julie Mockford	751		
Liberal Democrats	Norman Mockford	678		
Turnout				
Conservative gain from Liberal Democrats				
Conservative gain from Liberal Democrats				

=== East Grinstead Herontye ===
East Grinstead Herontye (2 seats)
Party	Candidate	Votes	%	±%
Conservative	Edward Belsey	1,074		
Conservative	Dick Sweatman	1,046		
Liberal Democrats	Chris Jerrey	692		
Liberal Democrats	Tony Joannou-Coetzee	630		
Turnout				
Conservative gain from Liberal Democrats				
Conservative gain from Liberal Democrats				

=== East Grinstead Imberhorne ===
East Grinstead Imberhorne (2 seats)
Party	Candidate	Votes	%	±%
Conservative	Heidi Brunsdon	995		
Liberal Democrats	Bob Mainstone	865		
Conservative	Rex Whittaker	794		
Liberal Democrats	Tim Wise	671		
Turnout				
Conservative gain from Liberal Democrats				
Liberal Democrats hold				

=== East Grinstead Town ===
East Grinstead Town (2 seats)
Party	Candidate	Votes	%	±%
Conservative	John O'Brien	711		
Liberal Democrats	Catrin Ingham	667		
Liberal Democrats	Howard Evans	617		
Conservative	Peter Wyan	601		
UKIP	Ian Simcock	201		
Turnout				
Conservative gain from Liberal Democrats				
Liberal Democrats hold				

=== Hassocks ===
Hassocks (3 seats)
Party	Candidate	Votes	%	±%
Conservative	Gordon Marples	1,545		
Liberal Democrats	Sue Hatton	1,423		
Conservative	Peter Martin	1,396		
Conservative	Neil Roberts	1,227		
Liberal Democrats	Betty Davies	1,082		
Liberal Democrats	Kristian Berggreen	1,037		
Labour	Steve Lewis	542		
UKIP	Ralph Wylam	340		
Turnout				
Conservative hold				
Liberal Democrats hold				
Conservative hold				

=== Haywards Heath Ashenground ===
Haywards Heath Ashenground (2 seats)
Party	Candidate	Votes	%	±%
Conservative	Jim Knight	714		
Liberal Democrats	Richard Bates	687		
Conservative	Sujan Wickremaratchi	668		
Liberal Democrats	Jon Gladstone	649		
Labour	Joanna Cane	294		
Labour	Alexander Batteson	287		
Turnout				
Conservative gain from Liberal Democrats				
Liberal Democrats hold				

=== Haywards Heath Bentswood ===
Haywards Heath Bentswood (2 seats)
Party	Candidate	Votes	%	±%
Conservative	David Dorking	658		
Labour	Richard Goddard	620		
Conservative	Stephen Hillier	619		
Liberal Democrats	Irene Balls	552		
Labour	Derek Booker	523		
Liberal Democrats	Charlotte Jones	483		
Turnout				
Conservative gain from Liberal Democrats				
Labour hold				

=== Haywards Heath Franklands ===
Haywards Heath Franklands (2 seats)
Party	Candidate	Votes	%	±%
Conservative	John de Mierre	950		
Conservative	Garry Wall	897		
Liberal Democrats	Friday Ng	400		
Liberal Democrats	Mark Thorogood	389		
Labour	Alan Yates	214		
Labour	Alan Rew	209		
Turnout				
Conservative hold				
Conservative hold				

=== Haywards Heath Heath ===
Haywards Heath Heath (2 seats)
Party	Candidate	Votes	%	±%
Conservative	Jonathan Ash-Edwards	1,090		
Conservative	Natalie March	966		
Liberal Democrats	Sussan Ng	713		
Liberal Democrats	Jane Clarke	703		
Labour	Linda Gregory	275		
UKIP	Lesley Montgomery	132		
Turnout				
Conservative hold				
Conservative hold				

=== Haywards Heath Lucastes ===
Haywards Heath Lucastes (2 seats)
Party	Candidate	Votes	%	±%
Conservative	Tim Farmer	1,168		
Conservative	Mims Davies	1,143		
Liberal Democrats	Hugh Faithfull	511		
Liberal Democrats	Tony Bridger	499		
Green	Alex Wise	390		
UKIP	Marc Montgomery	157		
Turnout				
Conservative hold				
Conservative hold				

=== High Weald ===
High Weald (2 seats)
Party	Candidate	Votes	%	±%
Conservative	Simon McMenemy	1,159		
Conservative	Christopher Hersey	1,152		
Green	Paul Brown	651		
Liberal Democrats	Christian Thal-Jantzen	529		
Turnout				
Conservative hold				
Conservative hold				

=== Hurstpierpoint and Downs ===
Hurstpierpoint and Downs (3 seats)
Party	Candidate	Votes	%	±%
Conservative	Jack Callaghan	1,435		
Conservative	Simon Banham	1,424		
Conservative	Colin Trumble	1,260		
Green	Mike Airey	706		
Green	Victoria Standfast	698		
Liberal Democrats	Rodney Jackson	693		
Independent	David Evans	648		
Green	Mark Vivian	575		
Liberal Democrats	David Drew	482		
Turnout				
Conservative hold				
Conservative hold				
Conservative hold				

=== Lindfield ===
Lindfield (3 seats)
Party	Candidate	Votes	%	±%
Conservative	Margaret Hersey	1,832		
Conservative	Christopher Snowling	1,778		
Conservative	Andrew Lea	1,734		
Liberal Democrats	Anne-Marie Lucraft	732		
Green	Peter Wemyss-Gorman	639		
Liberal Democrats	Isobel Staynes	556		
Liberal Democrats	Andrew McLean	468		
Labour	Michael Amor	418		
Turnout				
Conservative hold				
Conservative hold				
Conservative hold				

== By-elections ==
=== Cuckfield ===
This by-election was triggered by the resignation of incumbent councillor Katy Bourne, who was elected as Sussex Police and Crime Commissioner in November 2012.

Cuckfield by-election: 2 May 2013
Party	Candidate	Votes	%	±%
Conservative	Pete Bradbury	770	57.8	+9.6
Liberal Democrats	Stephen Blanch	429	32.2	–0.7
Labour	Stuart Gilboy	134	10.1	+3.1
Majority		341	25.6	
Turnout		1,333		
Conservative hold				

=== Haywards Heath Franklands ===
This by-election was triggered by the death of incumbent councillor John de Mierre on 31 October 2013.

Haywards Heath Franklands by-election: 19 December 2013
Party	Candidate	Votes	%	±%
Conservative	Rod Clarke	414	45.6	–8.0
UKIP	Howard Burrell	269	29.6	New
Labour	Greg Mountain	103	11.3	–0.8
Liberal Democrats	Anne-Marie Lucraft	91	10.0	−12.6
Green	Miranda Diboll	31	3.4	New
Majority		145	16.0	
Turnout		908		
Conservative hold				

=== Haywards Heath Lucastes ===
This by-election was triggered by the death of incumbent councillor Tim Farmer on 6 August 2014 from oesophageal cancer.

Haywards Heath Lucastes by-election: 23 October 2014
Party	Candidate	Votes	%	±%
Conservative	Geoff Rawlinson	524	56.4	+3.9
UKIP	Marc Montgomery	203	21.9	+14.8
Liberal Democrats	Nicholas Chapman	112	12.1	−10.9
Labour	Henry Fowler	90	9.7	New
Majority		321	34.6	
Turnout		929		
Conservative hold				

=== Bolney ===
This by-election was triggered by the resignation of incumbent councillor Sue Seward.

Bolney by-election: 13 November 2014
Party	Candidate	Votes	%	±%
Conservative	John Allen	261	42.9	−24.2
UKIP	Anthony Watts Williams	187	30.7	+17.4
Liberal Democrats	Simon Hicks	161	26.4	+6.9
Majority		74	12.2	
Turnout		609		
Conservative hold				
