= Martin Webb =

British businessman (born 1964)

Martin Webb (born 1964) is a British-born entrepreneur, television presenter and currently a property developer. He presented the series Risking It All aired on Channel 4 in 2005.

He wrote regular articles for the business supplement of The Sunday Telegraph.

== Early life ==
Webb was born at Westminster Hospital and attended Queen Elizabeth's Grammar School in Blackburn, Lancashire. He went on to study at Brighton Polytechnic. He was awarded an honorary doctorate in law by Brighton University in 2008.

== Business ==
Prior to his business success he very briefly joined both the Royal Navy and then the Metropolitan police.

In 2004, Webb set up Britain's first charity pub. The profits from The Robin Hood pub in Brighton go to local charities.

Webb co-founded the C-Side Leisure group with, the former Conservative MP for Brighton Kemptown, Simon Kirby, whose portfolio grew to include many pubs, clubs and restaurants in and around Brighton. Webb himself is a Labour supporter.

His first venture was a design company, Copywrite, founded with business partner Simon Kirby, but it went bust within three years. Other ventures have included Dekoart, a web-based fine art digital printing company, and another pub company, Medicine Group, which had sites in Islington and the ever-fashionable Shoreditch in London.

On 3 September 2016, he shut down The Dyke Pub and the following day reopened it as a second-hand furniture shop. This was done as permitted development, a planning loophole which allows owners to change the use of a business from A4 to A1 without the need to submit a planning application.

Webb plans to reopen the Dyke as a smaller bar in the darker half of the building, whilst developing private accommodation above and in the garden.

== Politics ==
Webb has announced his intention to run as an independent candidate in the 2028 Sussex and Brighton mayoral election.
