= 2015 Mid Sussex District Council election =

2015 UK local government election

- 7 May 2015

All 54 seats to Mid Sussex District Council 28 seats needed for a majority

	First party	Second party	Third party
Leader	Garry Wall	Richard Goddard	Stephen Barnett
Party	Conservative	Labour	Liberal Democrats
Leader's seat	Haywards Heath Franklands	Haywards Heath Bentswood (defeated)	Did not run (Note: Barnett was the incumbent councillor for Ashurst Wood, but did not run in the 2015 election.)
Last election	45 seats, 50.8%	1 seat, 7.0%	8 seats, 31.7%
Seats won	54	0	0
Seat change	▲9	▼1	▼8
Popular vote	39,879	12,595	11,770
Percentage	46.3%	14.6%	13.7%
Swing	▼4.5%	▲7.6%	▼18.0%
- Winner of each seat at the 2015 Mid Sussex District Council election
Leader before election
Garry Wall
Conservative
Leader after election
Garry Wall
Conservative

The 2015 Mid Sussex District Council election took place on 7 May 2015 to elect members of the Mid Sussex District Council in England. It was held on the same day as other local elections.

== Results summary ==
2015 Mid Sussex District Council election
Party	Seats	Gains	Losses	Net gain/loss	Seats %	Votes %	Votes	+/−
Conservative	54	9	0	▲9	100.0	46.3	39,879	–4.5
Labour	0	0	1	▼1	0.0	14.6	12,595	+7.6
Liberal Democrats	0	0	8	▼8	0.0	13.7	11,770	–18.0
UKIP	0	0	0	Steady	0.0	12.1	10,382	+8.9
Green	0	0	0	Steady	0.0	10.7	9,246	+4.7
Independent	0	0	0	Steady	0.0	2.5	2,174	+1.3

== Results by ward ==
=== Ardingly and Balcombe ===
Ardingly and Balcombe (2 seats)
Party	Candidate	Votes	%	±%
Conservative	Gary Marsh	1,620		
Conservative	Andrew MacNaughton	1,596		
Green	Gillian Maher	692		
Independent	Kathryn Metcalfe	594		
Labour	Alexi Demetriadi	543		
Turnout		3,074	70.1	
Conservative hold				
Conservative hold				

=== Ashurst Wood ===
Ashurst Wood
Party	Candidate	Votes	%	±%
Conservative	John Belsey	1,102		
Green	Catherine Edminson	219		
Labour	Alice Tyrrell	210		
Turnout		1,542	74.3	
Conservative gain from Liberal Democrats				

=== Bolney ===
Bolney
Party	Candidate	Votes	%	±%
Conservative	John Allen	859		
Liberal Democrats	Laura Brook	467		
UKIP	Peter Hopgood	320		
Turnout		1,667	75.4	
Conservative hold				

=== Burgess Hill Dunstall ===
Burgess Hill Dunstall (2 seats)
Party	Candidate	Votes	%	±%
Conservative	Jacqueline Landriani	1,385		
Conservative	Andrew Barrett-Miles	1,372		
UKIP	Timothy Cooper	463		
Liberal Democrats	Susan Knight	389		
Labour	Pamela Haigh	361		
Labour	David Chalkley	340		
Liberal Democrats	Graham Knight	331		
Green	Heather Salisbury	267		
Turnout		2,724	69.9	
Conservative hold				
Conservative hold				

=== Burgess Hill Franklands ===
Burgess Hill Franklands (2 seats)
Party	Candidate	Votes	%	±%
Conservative	Chris King	1,435		
Conservative	Ginny Heard	1,179		
Liberal Democrats	Graham Allen	732		
Liberal Democrats	Ernest Tudway	576		
UKIP	Gerald Carter	512		
Labour	Richard Kavanagh	394		
Green	Elaine Bolton	311		
Green	Robert Duggan	212		
Turnout		2,972	74.6	
Conservative hold				
Conservative hold				

=== Burgess Hill Leylands ===
Burgess Hill Leylands (2 seats)
Party	Candidate	Votes	%	±%
Conservative	Prudence Moore	1,209		
Conservative	Cherian Catharine	1,181		
Liberal Democrats	Simon Hicks	680		
Labour	Susan Jex	459		
Liberal Democrats	Tofojjul Hussain	443		
Green	Anne Miles-Eves	344		
Turnout		2,563	68.6	
Conservative hold				
Conservative hold				

=== Burgess Hill Meeds ===
Burgess Hill Meeds (2 seats)
Party	Candidate	Votes	%	±%
Conservative	Anne Jones	1,020		
Conservative	Richard Cherry	769		
Liberal Democrats	Janice Henwood	713		
Liberal Democrats	Robert Eggleston	697		
Labour	Tony Balsdon	503		
UKIP	Chris French	432		
Labour	Penelope Ritson	394		
Turnout		2,561	69.4	
Conservative hold				
Conservative gain from Liberal Democrats				

=== Burgess Hill St Andrews ===
Burgess Hill St Andrews (2 seats)
Party	Candidate	Votes	%	±%
Conservative	Kirsty Page	1,089		
Conservative	Colin Holden	907		
Liberal Democrats	Roger Cartwright	606		
Labour	David Boot	566		
Liberal Democrats	Kathellen Willis	530		
UKIP	Daniel Kinning	465		
Green	Matthew Cornish	297		
Turnout		2,593	69.4	
Conservative gain from Liberal Democrats				
Conservative gain from Liberal Democrats				

=== Burgess Hill Victoria ===
Burgess Hill Victoria (2 seats)
Party	Candidate	Votes	%	±%
Conservative	Steven Hansford	1,188		
Conservative	Mandy Thomas-Atkin	988		
Labour	Dean Faria	561		
UKIP	Geoffrey Boore	492		
Liberal Democrats	Michael Bliss	489		
Liberal Democrats	Collette Prevett	435		
Green	Terry Barnes	237		
Green	John Fernandez	196		
Turnout		2,769	65.7	
Conservative hold				
Conservative hold				

=== Copthorne and Worth ===
Copthorne and Worth (2 seats)
Party	Candidate	Votes	%	±%
Conservative	Anthony Dorey	1,850		
Conservative	Edward Mathews	1,159		
UKIP	John Runacres	630		
Labour	Timothy Cornell	463		
Turnout		2,700	69.1	
Conservative hold				
Conservative hold				

=== Crawley Down and Turners Hill ===
Crawley Down and Turners Hill (3 seats)
Party	Candidate	Votes	%	±%
Conservative	Bruce Forbes	2,144		
Conservative	Phillip Coote	1,942		
Conservative	Neville Walker	1,665		
Independent	Ian Gibson	1,580		
Labour	Alison Cornell	899		
Turnout		4,091	73.0	
Conservative hold				
Conservative hold				
Conservative hold				

=== Cuckfield ===
Cuckfield (2 seats)
Party	Candidate	Votes	%	±%
Conservative	Pete Bradbury	1,682		
Conservative	Robert Salisbury	1,658		
Liberal Democrats	Stephen Blanch	779		
Green	Margaret Tyzack More	634		
Labour	Sarah Moss	494		
Turnout		3,106	76.7	
Conservative hold				
Conservative hold				

=== East Grinstead Ashplats ===
East Grinstead Ashplats (2 seats)
Party	Candidate	Votes	%	±%
Conservative	Elizabeth Bennett	1,752		
Conservative	Peter Reed	1,395		
UKIP	Gary David	642		
Labour	Brian Sturtevant	524		
Green	Josie Jacobs	435		
Turnout		2,852	67.2	
Conservative hold				
Conservative hold				

=== East Grinstead Baldwins ===
East Grinstead Baldwins (2 seats)
Party	Candidate	Votes	%	±%
Conservative	Margaret Belsey	1,521		
Conservative	Norman Webster	1,384		
Green	James Symons	606		
UKIP	Ian Simcock	597		
Turnout		2,613	67.9	
Conservative hold				
Conservative hold				

=== East Grinstead Herontye ===
East Grinstead Herontye (2 seats)
Party	Candidate	Votes	%	±%
Conservative	Richard Sweatman	1,678		
Conservative	Edward Belsey	1,597		
Green	Christopher Jerrey	731		
UKIP	Mark Warren	598		
Turnout		2,800	73.0	
Conservative hold				
Conservative hold				

=== East Grinstead Imberhorne ===
East Grinstead Imberhorne (2 seats)
Party	Candidate	Votes	%	±%
Conservative	Bob Mainstone	1,706		
Conservative	Heidi Brunsdon	1,589		
Labour	Tess Fensterheim	581		
UKIP	Deanne Santini	531		
Turnout		2,704	76.1	
Conservative gain from Liberal Democrats				
Conservative hold				

=== East Grinstead Town ===
East Grinstead Town (2 seats)
Party	Candidate	Votes	%	±%
Conservative	Norman Mockford	1,059		
Conservative	Peter Wyan	1,023		
UKIP	Nigel Peacock	495		
Liberal Democrats	Howard Evans	490		
Labour	David Wilbraham	403		
Green	Edward Dean	324		
Green	Gary Hogman	279		
Turnout		2,426	65.9	
Conservative hold				
Conservative gain from Liberal Democrats				

=== Hassocks ===
Hassocks (3 seats)
Party	Candidate	Votes	%	±%
Conservative	Gordon Marples	2,086		
Conservative	Kevin Burke	1,946		
Conservative	Peter Martin	1,812		
Liberal Democrats	Betty Davies	1,235		
Liberal Democrats	Gemma Stockford	1,117		
Green	Victoria Standfast	915		
Labour	Luke Miller	823		
Labour	Stephen Lewis	800		
Labour	Linda Taylor	766		
UKIP	Anthony Armstrong	699		
Turnout		4,813	75.9	
Conservative hold				
Conservative gain from Liberal Democrats				
Conservative hold				

=== Haywards Heath Ashenground ===
Haywards Heath Ashenground (2 seats)
Party	Candidate	Votes	%	±%
Conservative	Anne Boutrup	1,102		
Conservative	Howard Mundin	997		
Labour	Suzanne Nicolson	619		
Liberal Democrats	Richard Bates	578		
Labour	John Walmsley	502		
UKIP	Simon Baker	402		
Liberal Democrats	Paul Lucraft	399		
UKIP	Marc Montgomery	311		
Green	Miranda Diboll	273		
Turnout		2,801	69.3	
Conservative hold				
Conservative gain from Liberal Democrats				

=== Haywards Heath Bentswood ===
Haywards Heath Bentswood (2 seats)
Party	Candidate	Votes	%	±%
Conservative	Diana de Mierre	1,113		
Conservative	David Dorking	1,084		
Labour	Richard Goddard	903		
Labour	Derek Booker	732		
UKIP	Charles Burrell	480		
Liberal Democrats	Cavan Wood	429		
UKIP	Brian Ireland	376		
Green	Adam Bromage-Hughes	334		
Turnout		2,983	69.4	
Conservative hold				
Conservative gain from Labour				

=== Haywards Heath Franklands ===
Haywards Heath Franklands (2 seats)
Party	Candidate	Votes	%	±%
Conservative	Roderick Clarke	1,468		
Conservative	Garry Wall	1,198		
Liberal Democrats	James France	633		
Labour	Zoe Muddle	598		
UKIP	Maria Burrell	533		
Turnout		2,773	72.9	
Conservative hold				
Conservative hold				

=== Haywards Heath Heath ===
Haywards Heath Heath (2 seats)
Party	Candidate	Votes	%	±%
Conservative	Jonathan Ash-Edwards	1,545		
Conservative	Sandra Ellis	1,400		
Liberal Democrats	Hannah Simcoe-Read	852		
Labour	Ian Moss	790		
UKIP	Howard Burrell	449		
Turnout		3,055	74.2	
Conservative hold				
Conservative hold				

=== Haywards Heath Lucastes ===
Haywards Heath Lucastes (2 seats)
Party	Candidate	Votes	%	±%
Conservative	James Knight	1,568		
Conservative	Geoff Rawlinson	1,567		
Liberal Democrats	Nicholas Chapman	676		
Liberal Democrats	Hugh Faithfull	583		
Labour	Rebecca Allen	541		
UKIP	Lesley Montgomery	437		
Turnout		3,153	72.6	
Conservative hold				
Conservative hold				

=== High Weald ===
High Weald (2 seats)
Party	Candidate	Votes	%	±%
Conservative	Christopher Hersey	1,678		
Conservative	Linda Stockwell	1,576		
Green	Paul Brown	975		
UKIP	David Badger	612		
Turnout		2,953	74.7	
Conservative hold				
Conservative hold				

=== Hurstpierpoint and Downs ===
Hurstpierpoint and Downs (3 seats)
Party	Candidate	Votes	%	±%
Conservative	Colin Trumble	2,250		
Conservative	John Wilkinson	2,123		
Conservative	Anthony Watts Williams	1,760		
Liberal Democrats	Rodney Jackson	807		
Green	Nicholas Dearden	745		
Liberal Democrats	Nigel Cook	621		
Labour	Ann Morgan	616		
Green	John Hudson	595		
UKIP	Jennifer Carter	593		
Green	Michael Airey	583		
Labour	David Hurry	564		
Labour	Leonard Morgan	431		
Turnout		4,430	74.7	
Conservative hold				
Conservative hold				
Conservative hold				

=== Lindfield ===
Lindfield (3 seats)
Party	Candidate	Votes	%	±%
Conservative	Margaret Hersey	2,770		
Conservative	Andrew Lea	2,524		
Conservative	Anthea Lea	2,406		
Liberal Democrats	Anne-Marie Lucraft	1,215		
Green	Elizabeth Tilston	907		
Green	Peter Wemyss-Gorman	896		
Labour	Judith Durrant	744		
Turnout		4,503	78.0	
Conservative hold				
Conservative hold				
Conservative hold				

== By-elections ==
=== Bolney ===
This by-election was triggered by the resignation of incumbent councillor John Allen.

Bolney by-election: 4 May 2017
Party	Candidate	Votes	%	±%
Conservative	Judy Llewellyn-Burke	562		
Liberal Democrats	Rodney Jackson	201		
UKIP	Peter Hopgood	320		
Monster Raving Loony	Baron von Thunderclap	33		
Turnout		858	39.4	
Conservative hold				

=== Burgess Hill Franklands ===
This by-election was triggered by the resignation of incumbent councillor Chris King.

Burgess Hill Franklands by-election: 4 May 2017
Party	Candidate	Votes	%	±%
Conservative	Claire Fussell	757		
Liberal Democrats	Graham Allen	600		
Labour	Elaine Bolton	175		
UKIP	Chris French	91		
Green	Robert Duggan	81		
Turnout		1,707	42.0	
Conservative hold				

=== Hassocks ===
This by-election was triggered by the dual-resignation of incumbent councillors Kevin Burke and Peter Martin.

Hassocks by-election (2 seats): 8 June 2017
Party	Candidate	Votes	%	±%
Conservative	Michelle Binks	2,023		
Liberal Democrats	Susan Hatton	1,931		
Conservative	Jessica Edwards	1,835		
Liberal Democrats	Gemma Stockford	1,536		
Labour	William Matthews	1,042		
Labour	Harry Young	812		
Green	Vivienne Aloy	512		
Turnout		5,103	79.3	
Conservative hold				
Liberal Democrats gain from Conservative				

=== East Grinstead Imberhorne ===
This by-election was triggered by the death of incumbent councillor Bob Mainstone on 29 August 2017.

East Grinstead Imberhorne by-election: 26 October 2017
Party	Candidate	Votes	%	±%
Conservative	Rex Whittaker	540		
Liberal Democrats	Tim Martin	206		
Labour	David Wilbraham	110		
Independent	Ian Sanders	67		
Turnout		925	24.6	
Conservative hold				
