= 1999 Mid Sussex District Council election =

1999 UK local government election

The 1999 Mid Sussex District Council election took place on 6 May 1999 to elect members of Mid Sussex District Council in West Sussex, England. One third of the council was up for election and the Conservative Party gained overall control of the council from no overall control.

After the election, the composition of the council was:

- Conservative 29
- Liberal Democrat 21
- Labour 2
- Independent 2

== Ward results ==
Hurstpierpoint Ward Election 6 May 1999
Party	Candidate	Votes	%	±%
Conservative	Simon Radford-Kirby	1,057	18.7	
Liberal Democrats	Betty Davies	497	8.8	
Labour	Maurice Epstein	247	4.4	
Conservative	Susanna Kemp	1,100	19.5	
Liberal Democrats	Rodney Jackson	606	10.7	
Labour	Ann Morgan	332	5.9	
Conservative	Rosemary Burns	1,294	22.9	
Liberal Democrats	Janet Slaughter	521	9.2	
Majority		451	8.0	
Turnout		5,654		
Conservative hold		Swing		
