= 2003 Mid Sussex District Council election =

2003 UK local government election

- 1 May 2003

All 54 seats to Mid Sussex District Council 28 seats needed for a majority
	First party	Second party	Third party
Party	Conservative	Liberal Democrats	Labour
Seats won	28	24	2
Seat change	▼1	▲3	Steady
	Fourth party
Party	Independent
Seats won	0
Seat change	▼2
- Winner of each seat

The 2003 Mid Sussex District Council election took place on 1 May 2003 to elect members of Mid Sussex District Council in England. It was held on the same day as other local elections. The Conservatives won a majority of one on the council.

== Council composition ==
After the election, the composition of the council was:

↓
28	24	2
Con	LDem	Lab

== Results summary ==
2003 Mid Sussex District Council election
Party	Seats	Gains	Losses	Net gain/loss	Seats %	Votes %	Votes	+/−
Conservative	28			▼1	51.9	53.4	30,973	
Liberal Democrats	24			▲3	44.4	40.1	23,289	
Labour	2			Steady	3.7	5.2	3,036	
Green	0			Steady	0.0	0.7	381	
Independent	0			▼2	0.0	0.5	300	
Monster Raving Loony	0			Steady	0.0	0.1	36	

== Ward results ==
=== Ardingly and Balcombe ===
Ardingly and Balcombe
Party	Candidate	Votes	%	±%
Conservative	Gary Marsh	868	72.6	
Conservative	Andrew MacNaughton	706		
Liberal Democrats	Donald Morrison	328	27.4	
Liberal Democrats	Ben Ross	222		
Turnout				
Conservative win (new seat)				
Conservative win (new seat)				

=== Ashurst Wood ===
Ashurst Wood
Party	Candidate	Votes	%	±%
Liberal Democrats	Stephen Barnett	485	67.5	
Conservative	John Saull	234	32.5	
Turnout				
Liberal Democrats win (new seat)				

=== Bolney ===
Bolney
Party	Candidate	Votes	%	±%
Conservative	Susan Seward	603	74.4	−3.9
Liberal Democrats	Anna Hodgetts	112	13.8	+4.0
Labour	Dawn Houghton	59	7.3	−4.6
Monster Raving Loony	Baron von Thunderclap	36	4.4	+4.4
Turnout				
Conservative hold		Swing		

=== Burgess Hill Dunstall ===
Burgess Hill Dunstall
Party	Candidate	Votes	%	±%
Conservative	Suzanne Cosgrave	453	53.7	
Conservative	Andrew Barrett-Miles	449		
Liberal Democrats	David Drew	391	46.3	
Liberal Democrats	Betty Davies	382		
Turnout				
Conservative win (new seat)				
Conservative win (new seat)				

=== Burgess Hill Franklands ===
Burgess Hill Franklands
Party	Candidate	Votes	%	±%
Liberal Democrats	Heather Ross	909	56.1	+11.9
Conservative	Michael Sullivan	712	43.9	−1.3
Conservative	Barbara Selby	645		
Turnout				
Liberal Democrats gain from Conservative		Swing		
Conservative hold		Swing		

=== Burgess Hill Leylands ===
Burgess Hill Leylands
Party	Candidate	Votes	%	±%
Liberal Democrats	Gillian Balsdon	711	71.2	
Liberal Democrats	Anne Jones	711		
Conservative	Peter Burgess	288	28.8	
Conservative	Alfred May	235		
Turnout				
Liberal Democrats win (new seat)				
Liberal Democrats win (new seat)				

=== Burgess Hill Meeds ===
Burgess Hill Meeds
Party	Candidate	Votes	%	±%
Liberal Democrats	Kathleen Dumbovic	690	66.5	
Liberal Democrats	Patrick Cutler	626		
Conservative	John Boulter	348	33.5	
Conservative	Julian Wadey	324		
Turnout				
Liberal Democrats win (new seat)				
Liberal Democrats win (new seat)				

=== Burgess Hill St Andrews ===
Burgess Hill St Andrews
Party	Candidate	Votes	%	±%
Liberal Democrats	David Shevels	563	63.1	−0.9
Liberal Democrats	Diane Shevels	522		
Conservative	Jacqueline Landriani	329	36.9	+13.1
Turnout				
Liberal Democrats hold		Swing		
Liberal Democrats hold		Swing		

=== Burgess Hill Victoria ===
Burgess Hill Victoria
Party	Candidate	Votes	%	±%
Liberal Democrats	Graham Knight	471	61.2	
Liberal Democrats	Lyn Williams	451		
Conservative	Edward Holland	299	38.8	
Conservative	Geraldine May	289		
Turnout				
Liberal Democrats win (new seat)				
Liberal Democrats win (new seat)				

=== Copthorne and Worth ===
Copthorne and Worth
Party	Candidate	Votes	%	±%
Conservative	Martin Forde	Unopposed		
Conservative	Edward Livesey	Unopposed		
Turnout			N/A	
Conservative hold		Swing		
Conservative hold		Swing		

=== Crawley Down and Turners Hill ===
Crawley Down and Turners Hill
Party	Candidate	Votes	%	±%
Conservative	Phillip Coote	804	56.8	
Conservative	Ian Scotland	795		
Conservative	Julian Calvert	794		
Liberal Democrats	Andrew Fynn	612	43.2	
Liberal Democrats	Felicity Bunting	603		
Liberal Democrats	Janette Wilson	530		
Turnout				
Conservative win (new seat)				
Conservative win (new seat)				
Conservative win (new seat)				

=== Cuckfield ===
Cuckfield
Party	Candidate	Votes	%	±%
Conservative	David King	717	55.2	−11.0
Conservative	Brenda Binge	687		
Independent	Peter Davis	300	23.1	+23.1
Liberal Democrats	Marianne Griffin	281	21.6	+1.7
Liberal Democrats	Mira McMichael	255		
Turnout				
Conservative hold		Swing		
Conservative hold		Swing		

=== East Grinstead Ashplats ===
East Grinstead Ashplats
Party	Candidate	Votes	%	±%
Liberal Democrats	Roland Lord	541	55.4	
Liberal Democrats	Paul Johnson	536		
Conservative	Margaret Ball	435	44.6	
Conservative	Matthew Madgwick	427		
Turnout				
Liberal Democrats win (new seat)				
Liberal Democrats win (new seat)				

=== East Grinstead Baldwins ===
East Grinstead Baldwins
Party	Candidate	Votes	%	±%
Liberal Democrats	Deborah Adams	506	58.0	
Liberal Democrats	Bernard Gillbard	502		
Conservative	Sally Beal	366	42.0	
Conservative	hillip Coote	314		
Turnout				
Liberal Democrats win (new seat)				
Liberal Democrats win (new seat)				

=== East Grinstead Herontye ===
East Grinstead Herontye
Party	Candidate	Votes	%	±%
Liberal Democrats	David Heasman	631	50.2	
Liberal Democrats	Ian Dixon	626		
Conservative	Edward Belsey	626	49.8	
Conservative	Andrew Lea	563		
Turnout				
Liberal Democrats win (new seat)				
Liberal Democrats win (new seat)				

Second seat decided on drawing of lots due to second and third place getting the same number of votes. Ian Dixon, the Liberal Democrat won therefore Edward Belsey was not elected.

=== East Grinstead Imberhorne ===
East Grinstead Imberhorne
Party	Candidate	Votes	%	±%
Liberal Democrats	Jean Glynn	624	57.4	
Liberal Democrats	Barry Starmer	565		
Conservative	Allan Beal	464	42.6	
Conservative	Brian Sparkes	429		
Turnout				
Liberal Democrats win (new seat)				
Liberal Democrats win (new seat)				

=== East Grinstead Town ===
East Grinstead Town
Party	Candidate	Votes	%	±%
Liberal Democrats	James Joyce-Nelson	258	60.7	
Liberal Democrats	Edward Matthews	254		
Conservative	Margaret Belsey	167	39.3	
Turnout				
Liberal Democrats win (new seat)				
Liberal Democrats win (new seat)				

=== Hassocks ===
Hassocks
Party	Candidate	Votes	%	±%
Conservative	Peter Martin	1,263	54.9	
Conservative	Gordon Marples	1,224		
Conservative	Patrick Shanahan	1,164		
Liberal Democrats	Nigel Cook	811	35.2	
Liberal Democrats	Jonathan Kemp	768		
Liberal Democrats	Stephen Mulligan	729		
Labour	Jennifer Epstein	227	9.9	
Labour	Arleene Piercy	212		
Labour	Stephen Lewis	187		
Turnout				
Conservative win (new seat)				
Conservative win (new seat)				
Conservative win (new seat)				

=== Haywards Heath Ashenground ===
Haywards Heath Ashenground
Party	Candidate	Votes	%	±%
Liberal Democrats	Brian Hall	748	63.2	+7.0
Liberal Democrats	Richard Bates	742		
Conservative	Gerald Madden	435	36.8	+13.2
Conservative	Rodney Ransom	413		
Turnout				
Liberal Democrats hold		Swing		
Liberal Democrats hold		Swing		

=== Haywards Heath Bentswood ===
Haywards Heath Bentswood
Party	Candidate	Votes	%	±%
Labour	Paddy Henry	633	55.3	−7.1
Labour	Richard Goddard	609		
Conservative	Clare Steele	325	28.4	+6.6
Conservative	James Horsman	322		
Liberal Democrats	John Riddington	186	16.3	+0.5
Liberal Democrats	Philip Brown	172		
Turnout				
Labour hold		Swing		
Labour hold		Swing		

=== Haywards Heath Franklands ===
Haywards Heath Franklands
Party	Candidate	Votes	%	±%
Conservative	Clive Chapman	548	54.2	+14.8
Conservative	Ian Ellis	521		
Liberal Democrats	Paul Lucraft	330	32.6	+3.6
Liberal Democrats	Anthony Mercer	324		
Labour	Denis Nyman	134	13.2	−18.4
Labour	Pascal Atkins	133		
Turnout				
Conservative hold		Swing		
Conservative hold		Swing		

=== Haywards Heath Heath ===
Haywards Heath Heath
Party	Candidate	Votes	%	±%
Liberal Democrats	Irene Wilkins	789	56.5	+8.1
Liberal Democrats	Julia Brown	774		
Conservative	Margaret Baker	608	43.5	+5.2
Conservative	Timothy Hartley	604		
Turnout				
Liberal Democrats hold		Swing		
Liberal Democrats hold		Swing		

=== Haywards Heath Lucastes ===
Haywards Heath Lucastes
Party	Candidate	Votes	%	±%
Conservative	Terence Gillard	695	53.8	
Conservative	Derek Booker	642		
Liberal Democrats	Irene Balls	597	46.2	
Liberal Democrats	Elizabeth Rodgers	493		
Turnout				
Conservative win (new seat)				
Conservative win (new seat)				

=== High Weald ===
High Weald
Party	Candidate	Votes	%	±%
Conservative	Christine Field	775	44.6	
Conservative	Christopher Hersey	591		
Liberal Democrats	Patricia Webster	581	33.4	
Green	Paul Brown	381	21.9	
Liberal Democrats	Leslie Camplisson	347		
Turnout				
Conservative win (new seat)				
Conservative win (new seat)				

=== Hurstpierpoint and Downs ===
Hurstpierpoint and Downs
Party	Candidate	Votes	%	±%
Conservative	Susanna Kemp	1,136	46.6	
Conservative	David Hampson	1,084		
Conservative	James Worsley	1,030		
Liberal Democrats	Rodney Jackson	827	33.9	
Labour	Ann Morgan	474	19.5	
Labour	Malcolm Uhlhorn	368		
Turnout				
Conservative win (new seat)				
Conservative win (new seat)				
Conservative win (new seat)				

=== Lindfield ===
Lindfield
Party	Candidate	Votes	%	±%
Conservative	Margaret Hersey	1,101	54.7	
Conservative	George Snowling	1,093		
Conservative	Mark Sharman	1,029		
Liberal Democrats	Anne-Marie Lucraft	910	45.3	
Liberal Democrats	Cyril Povey	824		
Liberal Democrats	Gillian House	807		
Turnout				
Conservative win (new seat)				
Conservative win (new seat)				
Conservative win (new seat)				
