= 2007 Mid Sussex District Council election =

2007 UK local government election

- 3 May 2007

All 54 seats to Mid Sussex District Council 28 seats needed for a majority

	First party	Second party	Third party
Party	Conservative	Liberal Democrats	Labour
Last election	28 seats, 53.4%	24 seats, 40.1%	2 seats, 5.2%
Seats won	30	23	1
Seat change	▲2	▼1	▼1
Popular vote	19,751	17,560	1,393
Percentage	44.4%	39.4%	3.1%
Swing	▼9.0%	▼0.7%	▼2.1%
- Winner of each seat at the 2007 Mid Sussex District Council election
Council control before election
Conservative
Council control after election
Conservative

The 2007 Mid Sussex District Council election took place on 3 May 2007 to elect members of Mid Sussex District Council in England. It was held on the same day as other local elections.

== Results summary ==
2007 Mid Sussex District Council election
Party	Seats	Net gain/loss	Seats %	Votes %	Votes	+/−
Conservative	30	▲2	55.5			
Liberal Democrats	23	▼1	42.6			
Labour	1	▼1	1.9			
Independents	0	Steady	0.0			
Green	0	Steady	0.0			
UKIP	0	Steady	0.0			

== Ward results ==
=== Ardingly and Balcombe ===
Ardingly and Balcombe (2 seats)
Party	Candidate	Votes	%	±%
Conservative	Gary Marsh*	934	54.4	−18.2
Conservative	Andrew MacNaughton*	879		
Green	Claire Green	396	23.1	+23.1
Liberal Democrats	Betty Davies	387	22.5	−4.9
Turnout			35.6	
Registered electors		3,943		
Conservative hold				
Conservative hold				

=== Ashurst Wood ===
Ashurst Wood (1 seat)
Party	Candidate	Votes	%	±%
Liberal Democrats	Stephen Barnett*	459	53.4	−14.1
Conservative	John Saull	338	39.3	+6.8
UKIP	Nick Chadburn	62	7.2	+7.2
Turnout			41.4	
Registered electors		2,087		
Liberal Democrats hold		Swing		

=== Bolney ===
Bolney (1 seat)
Party	Candidate	Votes	%	±%
Conservative	Susan Seward*	577	66.2	−8.5
Liberal Democrats	Anthony Davies	179	20.5	+6.7
UKIP	Peter Hopgood	116	13.3	+13.3
Turnout			42.8	
Registered electors		2,048		
Conservative hold		Swing		

=== Burgess Hill Dunstall ===
Burgess Hill Dunstall (2 seats)
Party	Candidate	Votes	%	±%
Conservative	Andrew Barrett-Miles*	832	67.3	+13.6
Conservative	Jacqui Landriani	774		
Liberal Democrats	Mike Bliss	405	32.7	−13.6
Turnout			32.2	
Registered electors		3,681		
Conservative hold				
Conservative hold				

=== Burgess Hill Franklands ===
Burgess Hill Franklands (2 seats)
Party	Candidate	Votes	%	±%
Liberal Democrats	Heather Ross*	922	50.8	−5.3
Conservative	Julian Thorpe	894	49.2	+5.3
Conservative	Iain Andrews	850		
Liberal Democrats	Janice Henwood	832		
Turnout			48.7	
Registered electors		3,743		
Liberal Democrats hold				
Conservative hold				

=== Burgess Hill Leylands ===
Burgess Hill Leylands (2 seats)
Party	Candidate	Votes	%	±%
Liberal Democrats	Anne Jones*	842	54.1	−17.1
Conservative	Pru Moore	714	45.9	+17.1
Liberal Democrats	Caroline Loosen	689		
Turnout			40.3	
Registered electors		3,687		
Liberal Democrats hold				
Conservative gain from Liberal Democrats				

=== Burgess Hill Meeds ===
Burgess Hill Meeds (2 seats)
Party	Candidate	Votes	%	±%
Liberal Democrats	Kathleen Dumbovic*	806	61.8	−4.7
Liberal Democrats	Patrick Cutler*	740		
Conservative	Steve Bell	498	38.2	+4.7
Conservative	Clare Penn-Sayers	328		
Turnout			39.2	
Registered electors		3,392		
Liberal Democrats hold				
Liberal Democrats hold				

=== Burgess Hill St Andrews ===
Burgess Hill St Andrews (2 seats)
Party	Candidate	Votes	%	±%
Liberal Democrats	David Shevels*	750	55.5	−7.6
Liberal Democrats	Diane Shevels*	709		
Conservative	Peter Burgess	485	35.9	−1.0
Conservative	Margaret Rumbold	462		
Labour	David Boot	116	8.6	+8.6
Turnout			38.8	
Registered electors		3,454		
Liberal Democrats hold				
Liberal Democrats hold				

=== Burgess Hill Victoria ===
Burgess Hill Victoria (2 seats)
Party	Candidate	Votes	%	±%
Conservative	Mandy Thomas-Atkin	728	51.4	+12.6
Liberal Democrats	Eileen Balsdon	687	48.6	−12.6
Conservative	Julian Wadey	681		
Liberal Democrats	Graham Knight*	680		
Turnout			38.2	
Registered electors		3,874		
Conservative gain from Liberal Democrats				
Liberal Democrats hold				

=== Copthorne and Worth ===
Copthorne and Worth (2 seats)
Party	Candidate	Votes	%	±%
Conservative	Mike Livesey	961	74.8	
Conservative	Sophia Harrison*	936		
Liberal Democrats	Anna Hodgetts	184	14.3	
Green	Philip Smith	139	10.8	
Turnout			33.8	
Registered electors		3,708		
Conservative hold				
Conservative hold				

=== Crawley Down and Turners Hill ===
Crawley Down and Turners Hill (3 seats)
Party	Candidate	Votes	%	±%
Liberal Democrats	Dorothy Hatswell	1,279	50.5	+7.3
Liberal Democrats	Ian Pearce	1,210		
Liberal Democrats	Mike Watts	1,154		
Conservative	Phillip Coote*	758	29.9	−26.9
Conservative	Sonia Lee	699		
Conservative	Neville Walker	637		
Green	Barrie Weller	206	8.1	+8.1
Independent	Eric Saunders	152	6.0	+6.0
Labour	Alison Cornell	137	5.4	+5.4
Turnout			41.1	
Registered electors		5,465		
Liberal Democrats gain from Conservative				
Liberal Democrats gain from Conservative				
Liberal Democrats gain from Conservative				

=== Cuckfield ===
Cuckfield (2 seats)
Party	Candidate	Votes	%	±%
Conservative	Edward King*	962	65.7	+10.5
Conservative	Brenda Binge*	945		
Liberal Democrats	Gillian Maher	502	34.3	+12.7
Liberal Democrats	Marianne Griffin	451		
Turnout			42.5	
Registered electors		3,638		
Conservative hold				
Conservative hold				

=== East Grinstead Ashplats ===
East Grinstead Ashplats (2 seats)
Party	Candidate	Votes	%	±%
Conservative	Liz Bennett	645	41.7	−2.9
Conservative	Peter Reed	600		
Liberal Democrats	Paul Johnson*	556	35.9	−19.5
Liberal Democrats	Alan Lord*	548		
Independent	Emma Baldry	346	22.4	+22.4
Turnout			36.8	
Registered electors		3,917		
Conservative gain from Liberal Democrats				
Conservative gain from Liberal Democrats				

=== East Grinstead Baldwins ===
East Grinstead Baldwins (2 seats)
Party	Candidate	Votes	%	±%
Liberal Democrats	Bernard Gillbard*	727	44.4	−13.6
Liberal Democrats	Andrew Brock	561		
Conservative	Margaret Belsey	494	30.2	−11.8
Green	Nick Gibson	415	25.4	+25.4
Conservative	Julian Walden	380		
Turnout			36.9	
Registered electors		3,793		
Liberal Democrats hold				
Liberal Democrats hold				

=== East Grinstead Herontye ===
East Grinstead Herontye (2 seats)
Party	Candidate	Votes	%	±%
Liberal Democrats	Ian Dixon*	899	52.1	+1.9
Liberal Democrats	Chris Jerrey	808		
Conservative	Edward Belsey	702	40.7	−9.1
Conservative	Nicolette Owden	630		
Independent	Bernard Conn	125	7.2	+7.2
Turnout			43.0	
Registered electors		3,689		
Liberal Democrats hold				
Liberal Democrats hold				

=== East Grinstead Imberhorne ===
East Grinstead Imberhorne (2 seats)
Party	Candidate	Votes	%	±%
Liberal Democrats	Heidi Brunsdon	995	66.9	+9.5
Liberal Democrats	Jean Glynn*	986		
Conservative	Sara Ball	404	27.2	−15.4
Conservative	Brian Sparkes	368		
Independent	Jack Hill	89	6.0	+6.0
Turnout			46.5	
Registered electors		3,218		
Liberal Democrats hold				
Liberal Democrats hold				

=== East Grinstead Town ===
East Grinstead Town (2 seats)
Party	Candidate	Votes	%	±%
Liberal Democrats	James Joyce-Nelson*	712	58.4	−2.3
Liberal Democrats	Edward Matthews*	687		
Conservative	Sonia Everett	420	34.5	−4.8
Conservative	David Oldbury	414		
Independent	John Ablett	87	7.1	+7.1
Turnout			35.5	
Registered electors		3,426		
Liberal Democrats hold				
Liberal Democrats hold				

=== Hassocks ===
Hassocks (3 seats)
Party	Candidate	Votes	%	±%
Liberal Democrats	Sue Hatton	1,358	41.3	
Conservative	Gordon Marples*	1,205	36.6	
Conservative	Peter Martin*	1,202		
Liberal Democrats	David Cumberland	1,178		
Liberal Democrats	Kristian Berggreen	1,142		
Conservative	Patrick Shanahan*	1,138		
Independent	Noel Thomas	568	17.3	
Independent	David Hammond	324		
Labour	Jenny Epstein	157	4.8	
Labour	Maurice Epstein	135		
Labour	Stephen Lewis	116		
Turnout			53.3	
Registered electors		5,665		
Liberal Democrats gain from Conservative				
Conservative hold				
Conservative hold				

=== Haywords Heath Ashenground ===
Haywords Heath Ashenground (2 seats)
Party	Candidate	Votes	%	±%
Liberal Democrats	Richard Bates*	941	61.2	
Liberal Democrats	Brian Hall*	923		
Conservative	Katy Bourne	597	38.8	
Conservative	Benedict White	536		
Turnout			41.2	
Registered electors		3,879		
Liberal Democrats hold				
Liberal Democrats hold				

=== Haywards Heath Bentswood ===
Haywards Heath Bentswood (2 seats)
Party	Candidate	Votes	%	±%
Liberal Democrats	Trevor Fisher	558	35.5	
Labour	Paddy Henry*	555	35.3	
Labour	Richard Goddard*	502		
Liberal Democrats	Paul Lucraft	468		
Conservative	Charlie de Mierre	459	29.2	
Conservative	Lalaine Jones	437		
Turnout			40.6	
Registered electors		3,828		
Liberal Democrats gain from Labour				
Labour hold				

=== Haywards Heath Franklands ===
Haywards Heath Franklands (2 seats)
Party	Candidate	Votes	%	±%
Conservative	Clive Chapman*	756	49.1	
Conservative	Garry Wall	675		
Independent	Mike Bright	420	27.3	
Liberal Democrats	Jacqueline Cooper	239	15.5	
Liberal Democrats	Victoria Jones	226		
Labour	Derek Davies	125	8.1	
Turnout			37.6	
Registered electors		3,519		
Conservative hold				
Conservative hold				

=== Haywards Heath Heath ===
Haywards Heath Heath (2 seats)
Party	Candidate	Votes	%	±%
Conservative	Margaret Baker	974	54.5	
Conservative	Jonathan Ash-Edwards	922		
Liberal Democrats	Julia Brown*	813	45.5	
Liberal Democrats	Lesley Wilkins*	762		
Turnout			46.0	
Registered electors		3,915		
Conservative gain from Liberal Democrats				
Conservative gain from Liberal Democrats				

=== Haywards Heath Lucastes ===
Haywards Heath Lucastes (2 seats)
Party	Candidate	Votes	%	±%
Conservative	John Belsey	686	37.2	
Conservative	Jane Keel	649		
Liberal Democrats	Irene Balls	583	31.6	
Independent	Terry Gillard*	574	31.1	
Independent	Derek Bookes*	522		
Liberal Democrats	Susan Ng	510		
Turnout			48.0	
Registered electors		3,757		
Conservative hold				
Conservative hold				

=== High Weald ===
High Weald (2 seats)
Party	Candidate	Votes	%	±%
Conservative	Chris Hersey*	989	55.0	
Conservative	James Temple-Smithson	973		
Green	Paul Brown	524	29.1	
Green	Catherine Edminson	507		
Liberal Democrats	Christian Thal-Jantzen	286	15.9	
Turnout			45.0	
Registered electors		3,920		
Conservative hold				
Conservative hold				

=== Hurstpierpoint and Downs ===
Hurstpierpoint and Downs (3 seats)
Party	Candidate	Votes	%	±%
Conservative	Susanna Kemp*	1,292	40.4	
Conservative	Christopher Maidment	1,270		
Conservative	Gina Field	1,206		
Liberal Democrats	Rodney Jackson	857	26.8	
Green	Mike Airey	746	23.3	
Labour	Ann Morgan	303	9.5	
Labour	Len Morgan	186		
Labour	Malcolm Uhlhorn	168		
Turnout			42.9	
Registered electors		5,509		
Conservative hold				
Conservative hold				
Conservative hold				

=== Lindfield ===
Lindfield (3 seats)
Party	Candidate	Votes	%	±%
Conservative	Christopher Snowling*	1,447	49.3	
Conservative	Margaret Hersey*	1,434		
Conservative	Andrew Lea	1,421		
Liberal Democrats	Anne-Marie Lucraft	634	21.6	
Green	Peter Wemyss-Gorman	454	15.5	
Liberal Democrats	Andrew McLean	451		
Liberal Democrats	Mark Thorogood	406		
Independent	Mike Allen	398	13.6	
Turnout			43.4	
Registered electors		5,429		
Conservative hold				
Conservative hold				
Conservative hold				

== By-elections ==
=== Burgess Hill St Andrews ===
Burgess Hill St Andrews by-election (2 seats): 3 July 2008
Party	Candidate	Votes	%	±%
Liberal Democrats	Janice Henwood	876		
Liberal Democrats	Graham Knight	829		
Conservative	Peter Burgess	561		
Conservative	Jim Clapperton	501		
Green	Philip Smith	65		
Labour	Leigh Marshall	40		
Turnout		2,872		
Liberal Democrats hold				
Liberal Democrats hold				

=== Hurstpierpoint and Downs (2008) ===
Hurstpierpoint and Downs by-election: 24 July 2008
Party	Candidate	Votes	%	±%
Conservative	Jack Callaghan	1,040	51.4	+11.0
Liberal Democrats	Rodney Jackson	608	30.1	+3.3
Green	Mike Airey	374	18.4	−4.8
Majority		432	21.3	
Turnout		2,022	35.9	
Conservative hold				

=== Haywards Heath Bentswood ===
Haywards Heath Bentswood by-election: 22 January 2009
Party	Candidate	Votes	%	±%
Liberal Democrats	Irene Balls	514	36.9	+1.4
Labour	Richard Goddard	456	32.7	–2.6
Conservative	Andy Mackintosh	332	23.8	−5.4
BNP	Tony Brewer	92	6.6	New
Majority		58	4.2	
Turnout		1,394		
Liberal Democrats hold				

=== Cuckfield ===
This by-election was triggered by the death of incumbent councillor Brenda Binge on 24 February 2010 from hepatitis C complications.

Cuckfield by-election: 6 May 2010
Party	Candidate	Votes	%	±%
Conservative	Robert Salisbury	1,597	54.0	–11.7
Liberal Democrats	Stephen Blanch	1,362	46.0	+11.7
Majority		235	8.0	
Turnout		2,959		
Conservative hold				

=== Haywards Heath Heath ===
Haywards Heath Heath by-election: 6 May 2010
Party	Candidate	Votes	%	±%
Liberal Democrats	Sue Ng	1,350	46.9	+1.4
Conservative	Ruth de Mierre	1,310	45.5	−9.0
Labour	Alan Yates	221	7.7	New
Majority		40	1.4	
Turnout		2,881		
Liberal Democrats gain from Conservative				

=== High Weald ===
High Weald by-election: 6 May 2010
Party	Candidate	Votes	%	±%
Conservative	Simon McMenemy	1,670	55.9	+0.9
Liberal Democrats	Anne-Marie Lucraft	922	30.9	+15.0
Green	Paul Brown	395	13.2	–15.9
Majority		748	25.0	
Turnout		2,987		
Conservative hold				

=== Hurstpierpoint and Downs (2010) ===
Hurstpierpoint and Downs by-election: 6 May 2010
Party	Candidate	Votes	%	±%
Conservative	Anna DeFilippo	2,362	56.1	+15.7
Liberal Democrats	Rodney Jackson	1,848	43.9	+17.1
Majority		514	12.2	
Turnout		4,210		
Conservative hold				

=== Haywards Heath Franklands ===
This by-election was triggered by the death of incumbent councillor Clive Chapman in May 2010.

Haywards Heath Franklands by-election: 29 July 2010
Party	Candidate	Votes	%	±%
Conservative	John de Mierre	545	50.8	+1.7
Liberal Democrats	Raha Kazemi	464	43.3	+27.8
Independent	Colin Bates	63	5.9	New
Majority		81	7.6	
Turnout		1,072		
Conservative hold				
