= Sussex Police and Crime Commissioner =

Police and crime commissioner for the Sussex Police

- Incumbent; Katy Bourne since 22 November 2012
- Police and crime commissioner of Sussex Police
- Reports to: Sussex Police and Crime Panel
- Appointer: Electorate of Sussex (East Sussex, West Sussex and Brighton and Hove)
- Term length: Four years
- Constituting instrument: Police Reform and Social Responsibility Act 2011
- Precursor: Sussex Police Authority
- Inaugural holder: Katy Bourne
- Formation: 22 November 2012
- Deputy: Deputy Police and Crime Commissioner
- Salary: £88,600
- Website: sussex-pcc.gov.uk

The Sussex Police and Crime Commissioner is the police and crime commissioner, an elected official tasked with setting out the way crime is tackled by Sussex Police in the English County of Sussex. The post was created on 21 November 2012, following an election held on 15 November 2012, and replaced the Sussex Police Authority. The current commissioner is Conservative Party politician Katy Bourne, who is currently serving her fourth term in office, having first been elected in 2012 and having been re-elected in 2016, 2021 and 2024. The police and crime commissioner is required to produce a strategic Sussex Police and Crime Plan, setting out the priorities for Sussex Police, and their work is scrutinised by the Sussex Police and Crime Panel.

The post was the first to be elected on a Sussex-wide basis since 1832 when the Sussex parliamentary constituency was replaced by constituencies for Sussex's eastern and western divisions.

== List of Sussex Police and Crime Commissioners ==
Name	Political party	From	To
Katy Bourne	Conservative	22 November 2012	Incumbent

== Elections ==
The Sussex Police and Crime Commissioner is elected by the first past the post method for a fixed term of four years, although the inaugural term of the post was for three and a half years, and the 2016-2021 term was five years, owing to the 2020 election being delayed a year by the coronavirus pandemic. Elections to the post previously used the supplementary vote method, but this was changed in May of 2023.

=== 2024 ===
Winner of each local authority within the Sussex Police electoral area

2024 Sussex Police and Crime Commissioner election
Party	Candidate	Votes	%	±%
Conservative	Katy Bourne	122,495	39.0	–8.3
Labour	Paul Richards	99,502	31.7	+13.1
Liberal Democrats	Jamie Bennett	48,923	15.6	+1.6
Green	Johnathan Kent	43,105	13.7	+0.3
Turnout		314,025	24.4	–11.3
Conservative hold				

=== 2021 ===
2021 Sussex police and crime commissioner election
Party	Candidate	1st round		2nd round			1st round votesTransfer votes, 2nd round
Party	Candidate	Total	Of round	Transfers	Total	Of round	1st round votesTransfer votes, 2nd round
Conservative	Katy Bourne*	214,523	47.28%	30,287	244,810	65.62%	
Labour	Paul Richards	84,736	18.68%	43,523	128,259	34.38%	
Liberal Democrats	Jamie Bennett	63,271	13.94%				
Green	Kahina Bouhassane	60,781	13.40%				
Independent	Roy Williams	30,408	6.70%				
Turnout			35.77%				
Conservative hold							

=== 2016 ===
Katy Bourne won re-election only after second preference votes were counted, with Michael Jones coming second. Voter turnout was higher than in 2012 at 22.6 per cent. The central count was held at the East Sussex National Golf Course near Uckfield.

Sussex Police and Crime Commissioner election, 2016
Party	Candidate	1st round		2nd round			1st round votesTransfer votes, 2nd round
Party	Candidate	Total	Of round	Transfers	Total	Of round	1st round votesTransfer votes, 2nd round
Conservative	Katy Bourne	114,570	41.8%	24,765	139,335		
Labour	Michael Jones	61,017	22.3%	25,375	86,392		
UKIP	Patrick Lowe	43,075	15.7%				
Liberal Democrats	James Walsh	29,550	10.8%				
Green	James Doyle	26,038	9.5%				
Turnout		274,250	22.54%				
Rejected ballots							
Total votes							
Registered electors							
Conservative hold							

=== 2012 ===
The inaugural election took place on 21 November 2012 and was won by Katy Bourne. Voter turnout was 15.8 per cent.

Sussex Commissioner election, 2012
Party	Candidate	1st round		2nd round			1st round votesTransfer votes, 2nd round
Party	Candidate	Total	Of round	Transfers	Total	Of round	1st round votesTransfer votes, 2nd round
Conservative	Katy Bourne	59,635	32%	20,393	80,028		
Labour	Godfrey Daniel	40,765	22%	14,837	55,602		
Independent	Ian Chisnall	38,930	21%				
UKIP	Tony Armstrong	29,327	15%				
Liberal Democrats	David Rogers	20,579	11%				
Turnout		189,236	15.3%				
Rejected ballots		5,982					
Total votes		195,218					
Conservative win							

== See also ==
- Sussex Police
- History of local government in Sussex
