= Vale of White Horse District Council elections =

Local government elections in Oxfordshire, England

Elections to the Vale of White Horse District Council, the local authority for the Vale of White Horse in Oxfordshire, England take place every four years.

== Council elections ==
- 1973 Vale of White Horse District Council election
- 1976 Vale of White Horse District Council election
- 1979 Vale of White Horse District Council election (New ward boundaries)
- 1983 Vale of White Horse District Council election (District boundary changes took place but the number of seats remained the same)
- 1987 Vale of White Horse District Council election (District boundary changes took place but the number of seats remained the same)
- 1991 Vale of White Horse District Council election (District boundary changes took place but the number of seats remained the same)
- 1995 Vale of White Horse District Council election
- 1999 Vale of White Horse District Council election
- 2003 Vale of White Horse District Council election (New ward boundaries)
- 2007 Vale of White Horse District Council election
- 2011 Vale of White Horse District Council election
- 2015 Vale of White Horse District Council election (New ward boundaries)
- 2019 Vale of White Horse District Council election
- 2023 Vale of White Horse District Council election

== Election results ==
Composition of the council
Year	Conservative	Liberal Democrats (Note: Includes totals for the predecessors of the Liberal Democrats, the Liberal Party and SDP (both of which participated in the Alliance).)	Labour	Green (Note: Includes totals for the predecessors of the Green Party of England and Wales, the Ecology Party and Green Party UK.)	Independents & Others	Council control after election
Local government reorganisation; council established (48 seats)
1973	27	3	8	–	10	Conservative
1976	40	1	4	0	3	Conservative
New ward boundaries (51 seats)
1979	43	1	4	0	3	Conservative
1983	40	8	1	0	2	Conservative
1987	41	8	1	0	1	Conservative
1991	29	18	2	0	2	Conservative
1995	11	34	5	0	1	Liberal Democrats
1999	15	33	2	0	1	Liberal Democrats
New ward boundaries (51 seats)
2003	21	29	0	0	1	Liberal Democrats
2007	17	34	0	0	0	Liberal Democrats
2011	31	19	1	0	0	Conservative
New ward boundaries (38 seats)
2015	29	9	0	0	0	Conservative
2019	6	31	0	1	0	Liberal Democrats
2023	0	34	0	4	0	Liberal Democrats

== Results maps ==
2003 results map

2007 results map

2011 results map

2015 results map

2019 results map

2023 results map

== By-election results ==
=== 1995-1999 ===
Grove By-Election 12 March 1998
Party	Candidate	Votes	%	±%
Liberal Democrats		611	45.0	+1.5
Conservative		570	41.9	+6.9
Labour		178	13.1	−8.4
Majority		41	3.1	
Turnout		1,359	24.0	
Liberal Democrats hold		Swing		

=== 1999-2003 ===
Sunningwell and Wootton By-Election 4 October 2001
Party	Candidate	Votes	%	±%
Liberal Democrats		558	64.8	+2.0
Conservative		303	35.2	−2.0
Majority		255	29.6	
Turnout		861	31.2	
Liberal Democrats hold		Swing		

Caldecott By-Election 15 November 2001
Party	Candidate	Votes	%	±%
Liberal Democrats		692	46.7	−1.2
Conservative		621	41.9	+5.7
Labour		170	11.5	−4.4
Majority		71	4.8	
Turnout		1,483	25.0	
Liberal Democrats hold		Swing		

Grove By-Election 21 March 2002
Party	Candidate	Votes	%	±%
Conservative		733	49.8	+9.5
Liberal Democrats		532	36.1	−9.4
Independent		207	14.1	+14.1
Majority		201	13.7	
Turnout		1,472	24.8	
Conservative hold		Swing		

Cumnor By-Election 26 September 2002
Party	Candidate	Votes	%	±%
Liberal Democrats		826	57.6	+7.1
Conservative		608	42.4	+4.9
Majority		218	15.2	
Turnout		1,434	28	
Liberal Democrats hold		Swing		

=== 2003-2007 ===
Wantage Charlton By-Election 4 November 2004
Party	Candidate	Votes	%	±%
Liberal Democrats	Derek Verdin	844	47.4	+10.3
Conservative	Henry Richardson	720	40.4	−0.4
Labour		216	12.1	+0.4
Majority		124	7.0	
Turnout		1,780	33.4	
Liberal Democrats gain from Conservative		Swing		

Drayton By-Election 13 October 2005
Party	Candidate	Votes	%	±%
Liberal Democrats	Richard Webber	343	55.2	−11.7
Conservative	Michael Murray	215	34.6	+1.5
Labour	William Akers	63	10.1	+10.1
Majority		128	20.6	
Turnout		621	35.5	
Liberal Democrats hold		Swing		

Kennington & South Hinksey By-Election 6 April 2006
Party	Candidate	Votes	%	±%
Liberal Democrats	Bernard Auton	771	57.2	+0.9
Conservative	Gareth Jennings	577	42.8	+7.7
Majority		194	14.4	
Turnout		1,348	39.6	
Liberal Democrats hold		Swing		

=== 2007-2011 ===
Wantage Charlton By-Election 13 March 2008
Party	Candidate	Votes	%	±%
Conservative	John Morgan	760	45.6	+3.6
Liberal Democrats	Lorraine Todd	731	43.8	−3.8
Labour	Ed Mitchell	177	10.6	+0.2
Majority		29	1.8	
Turnout		1,668		
Conservative gain from Liberal Democrats		Swing		

Abingdon Dunmore By-Election 22 October 2009
Party	Candidate	Votes	%	±%
Liberal Democrats	Julia Bricknell	796	52.6	+0.1
Conservative	Monica Lovatt	602	39.8	−1.4
Green	Richard Bullock	71	4.7	+4.7
Labour	Bobbie Nichols	43	2.8	−3.5
Majority		194	12.8	
Turnout		1,512		
Liberal Democrats hold		Swing		

=== 2011-2015 ===
Sunningwell and Wootton By-Election 6 December 2012 (2 seats)
Party	Candidate	Votes	%	±%
Liberal Democrats	Valerie Shaw	577		
Liberal Democrats	Elizabeth Miles	549		
Conservative	Adam Hardiman	346		
Conservative	Richard Treffler	333		
Liberal Democrats gain from Conservative		Swing		
Liberal Democrats gain from Conservative		Swing		

Abingdon Peachcroft By-Election 2 May 2013
Party	Candidate	Votes	%	±%
Liberal Democrats	Andrew Skinner	683	51.2	+8.9
Conservative	Peter Wiblin	518	38.8	−6.9
Labour	George Ryall	133	10.0	−2.0
Majority		165	12.4	
Turnout		1,334		
Liberal Democrats gain from Conservative		Swing		

Greendown By-Election 2 May 2013
Party	Candidate	Votes	%	±%
Conservative	St John Dickson	351	52.8	+10.6
Liberal Democrats	Brian Sadler	199	29.9	−15.5
UKIP	Jason Kent	115	17.3	+17.3
Majority		152	22.9	
Turnout		665		
Conservative gain from Liberal Democrats		Swing		

Marcham and Shippon By-Election 2 May 2013
Party	Candidate	Votes	%	±%
Liberal Democrats	Catherine Webber	308	43.5	−5.8
Conservative	Jackie Gibb	260	36.7	+0.0
UKIP	Christopher Parkes	140	19.8	+19.8
Majority		48	6.8	
Turnout		708		
Liberal Democrats hold		Swing		

Abingdon Fitzharris By-Election 4 July 2013
Party	Candidate	Votes	%	±%
Liberal Democrats	Jeanette Halliday	479	50.3	+7.6
Conservative	Monica Lovatt	378	39.7	+0.0
Labour	George Ryall	96	10.1	−7.5
Majority		101	10.6	
Turnout		953		
Liberal Democrats gain from Conservative		Swing		

Wantage Charlton By-Election 10 April 2014
Party	Candidate	Votes	%	±%
Conservative	Julia Reynolds	591	41.9	−5.3
Liberal Democrats	Jim Sibbald	542	38.4	+2.5
Labour	Nathan Sparks	155	11.0	−5.9
Green	Kevin Harris	124	8.8	+8.8
Majority		49	3.5	
Turnout		1,412		
Conservative hold		Swing		

Abingdon Dunmore By-Election 11 September 2014
Party	Candidate	Votes	%	±%
Liberal Democrats	Margaret Crick	745	52.4	+14.7
Conservative	Andrew Todd	501	35.2	−6.1
UKIP	Christopher Parkes	90	6.3	+6.3
Labour	Mike Gould	87	6.1	−4.7
Majority		244	17.1	
Turnout		1,423		
Liberal Democrats hold		Swing		

=== 2019-2023 ===
Grove North By-Election 6 May 2021
Party	Candidate	Votes	%	±%
Conservative	Ben Mabbett	704	44.9	+14.5
Liberal Democrats	Andy Przybysz	575	36.7	−9.4
Labour	Marci Sandels	191	12.2	+0.2
Green	Viral Patel	98	6.3	+6.3
Majority		129	8.2	
Turnout		1,568		
Conservative gain from Liberal Democrats		Swing		

Steventon and the Hanneys By-Election 5 May 2022
Party	Candidate	Votes	%	±%
Liberal Democrats	Sally Povolotsky	878	55.1	+14.1
Conservative	Louise Brown	517	32.4	−15.8
Independent	David Corps	199	12.5	+12.5
Majority		361	22.6	
Turnout		1,594		
Liberal Democrats gain from Conservative		Swing		

=== 2023-2027 ===
Sutton Courtenay By-Election 20 June 2024
Party	Candidate	Votes	%	±%
Liberal Democrats	Peter Stevens	226	33.6	−24.9
Green	Aidan Reilly	214	31.8	+18.3
Conservative	Christopher Campbell	182	27.1	−0.8
Labour	Stephen Webb	50	7.4	+7.4
Majority		12	1.8	
Turnout		672		
Liberal Democrats hold		Swing		

Botley and Sunningwell By-Election 10 July 2025
Party	Candidate	Votes	%	±%
Liberal Democrats	Ben Potter	732	71.5	+7.9
Conservative	Charlotte Adlung	162	15.8	−4.8
Green	Thomas Gaston	130	12.7	+11.2
Majority		570	55.7	
Turnout		1,024		
Liberal Democrats hold		Swing		

Ridgeway By-Election 13 November 2025
Party	Candidate	Votes	%	±%
Liberal Democrats	Hannah Griffin	442	43.1	−14.9
Conservative	Charlotte Dickson	250	24.4	−17.6
Reform UK	Henry de Kretser	204	19.9	+19.9
Green	Kiera Barnett	122	11.9	+11.9
Labour	Rob Blundell	8	0.8	+0.8
Majority		192	18.7	
Turnout		1,026		
Liberal Democrats hold		Swing		

Abingdon Abbey Northcourt By-Election 15 March 2026
Party	Candidate	Votes	%	±%
Liberal Democrats	Caleb Pell	647	43.7	+3.3
Green	Aidan Reilly	480	32.5	−2.0
Reform UK	Luis Prado	204	13.8	+13.8
Conservative	Chris Palmer	101	6.8	−7.4
Labour	Stephen Webb	47	3.2	−7.7
Majority		167	11.3	
Turnout		1,479		
Liberal Democrats gain from Green		Swing		

Stanford By-Election 26 March 2026
Party	Candidate	Votes	%	±%
Conservative	Lee Evans	666	45.9	+2.5
Liberal Democrats	Adrian Bettridge	395	27.2	−17.0
Reform UK	Sarah von Simson	261	18.0	+18.0
Green	Jacob Yung	115	7.9	−4.5
Labour	Rob Blundell	13	0.9	+0.9
Majority		271	18.7	
Turnout		1,450		
Conservative gain from Liberal Democrats		Swing		
