= 2019 Vale of White Horse District Council election =

2019 UK local government election

- May 2, 2019

All 38 seats for Vale of White Horse District Council 20 seats needed for a majority
	First party	Second party
Party	Liberal Democrats	Conservative
Seats before	9	29
Seats won	31	6
Seat change	▲22	▼23
Popular vote	21,421	12,088
Percentage	55.4%	31.2%
Swing	▲23.3%	▼14.4%
	Third party	Fourth party
Party	Green	Labour
Seats before	0	0
Seats won	1	0
Seat change	▲1	Steady
Popular vote	1,965	2,636
Percentage	5.1%	6.8%
Swing	▲0.8%	▼1.9%
- Results of the 2019 Vale of White Horse District Council election
Council Control before election
Conservative
Elected Council Control
Liberal Democrats

The 2019 Vale of White Horse District Council election took place on 2 May 2019 to elect members of Vale of White Horse District Council in England. This was held on the same day as other local elections as part of the 2019 United Kingdom local elections. The election saw a landslide for the Liberal Democrats, who regained control of the council from the Conservatives after having previously lost control in 2011.

== Election results ==
2019 Vale of White Horse District Council election
Party	Candidates	Seats	Gains	Losses	Net gain/loss	Seats %	Votes %	Votes	+/−
Liberal Democrats	36	31	22	0	▲22	81.6	55.4	21,421	+23.3
Conservative	38	6	0	23	▼23	15.8	31.2	12,088	–14.4
Green	4	1	1	0	▲1	2.6	5.1	1,965	+0.8
Labour	14	0	0	0	Steady	0.0	6.8	2,636	–3.6
UKIP	3	0	0	0	Steady	0.0	1.3	485	–3.4
Independent	1	0	0	0	Steady	0.0	0.3	103	–0.2

== Ward results ==
* = sitting councillor in this ward prior to election

Abingdon Abbey Northcourt (2 seats)
Party	Candidate	Votes	%	±%
Liberal Democrats	Elizabeth Helen Pighills*	1,417	72.9	
Green	Cheryl Karen Briggs	1,250	64.3	
Conservative	Katie Anne Finch*	449	23.1	
Conservative	Dennis Edward Garrett	439	22.6	
Majority		801	22.5	
Turnout		1,967	41.94	
Liberal Democrats hold		Swing		
Green gain from Conservative		Swing		

Abingdon Caldecott (2 seats)
Party	Candidate	Votes	%	±%
Liberal Democrats	Samantha Bowring	1,154	56.0	
Liberal Democrats	Neil Fawcett	1,153	56.0	
Conservative	Alice Elizabeth Badcock*	654	31.8	
Conservative	Mike Badcock*	617	30.0	
Labour	Jon Bounds	296	14.4	
Majority		499	12.9	
Turnout		2,124	37.93	
Liberal Democrats gain from Conservative		Swing		
Liberal Democrats gain from Conservative		Swing		

Abingdon Dunmore (2 seats)
Party	Candidate	Votes	%	±%
Liberal Democrats	Margaret Louise Crick*	1,367	65.0	
Liberal Democrats	Andy Foulsham	1,300	61.8	
Conservative	Sandy Lovatt*	602	28.6	
Conservative	David James Pope	587	27.9	
Labour	Paul Anthony Burton	174	8.3	
Majority		698	17.3	
Turnout		2,135	45.86	
Liberal Democrats gain from Conservative		Swing		
Liberal Democrats hold		Swing		

Abingdon Fitzharris (2 seats)
Party	Candidate	Votes	%	±%
Liberal Democrats	Eric Richmond de la Harpe	1,172	58.8	
Liberal Democrats	Robert James Maddison	1,155	58.0	
Conservative	Monica Mary Lovatt*	639	32.1	
Conservative	Christopher Francis Palmer*	569	28.5	
Labour	Marek Tadeusz Dryzmalski	158	7.9	
Majority		516	14.0	
Turnout		2,046	42.68	
Liberal Democrats gain from Conservative		Swing		
Liberal Democrats gain from Conservative		Swing		

Abingdon Peachcroft (2 seats)
Party	Candidate	Votes	%	±%
Liberal Democrats	Mike Pighills	1,407	63.7	
Liberal Democrats	Max Thompson	1,372	62.1	
Conservative	Vicky Jenkins*	689	31.2	
Conservative	Simon Peter John Hutton	629	28.5	
Independent	George Douglas Ryall	103	4.7	
Majority		683	16.3	
Turnout		2,243	42.61	
Liberal Democrats gain from Conservative		Swing		
Liberal Democrats gain from Conservative		Swing		

George Ryall was the Labour candidate, but appeared on the ballot paper without a party description due to an administrative error.

Blewbury & Harwell (2 seats)
Party	Candidate	Votes	%	±%
Liberal Democrats	Hayleigh Marie Gascoigne	1,502	61.0	
Liberal Democrats	Sarah Ann Medley	1,452	59.0	
Conservative	Reg Waite*	698	28.4	
Conservative	Mike Johnston	683	27.7	
UKIP	David Roberts	219	8.9	
Majority		754	16.6	
Turnout		2,484	41.24	
Liberal Democrats gain from Conservative		Swing		
Liberal Democrats gain from Conservative		Swing		

Botley & Sunningwell (2 seats)
Party	Candidate	Votes	%	±%
Liberal Democrats	Emily Smith*	1,336	63.0	
Liberal Democrats	Debby Hallett*	1,329	62.7	
Conservative	Michael Francis Murray	338	16.0	
Conservative	James Moreton Wakeley	319	15.1	
Green	Katherine Elizabeth Phillips	288	13.6	
Labour	Erica Elizabeth Davis	271	12.8	
Labour	Maurice Paul O'Donoghue	222	10.5	
Majority		991	24.2	
Turnout		2,141	43.61	
Liberal Democrats hold		Swing		
Liberal Democrats hold		Swing		

Cumnor (2 seats)
Party	Candidate	Votes	%	±%
Liberal Democrats	Alison Elizabeth Jenner	1,347	63.5	
Liberal Democrats	Judy Roberts*	1,321	62.3	
Conservative	Alison Mary Thomson	591	27.9	
Conservative	Oliver Langton Wright	543	25.6	
Labour	Mileva Bella Bond	214	10.1	
Majority		730	18.2	
Turnout		2,145	43.11	
Liberal Democrats hold		Swing		
Liberal Democrats hold		Swing		

Drayton (1)
Party	Candidate	Votes	%	±%
Liberal Democrats	Andy Cooke	653	73.9	+38.4
Conservative	Justin Richard Gilroy	231	26.1	−11.7
Majority		422	47.7	
Turnout		900	35.41	
Liberal Democrats gain from Conservative		Swing		

Faringdon (2 seats)
Party	Candidate	Votes	%	±%
Liberal Democrats	Bethia Jane Thomas	1,132	56.0	
Liberal Democrats	David Andrew Grant	933	46.2	
Conservative	David James Barron	509	25.2	
Conservative	David Price	469	23.2	
Labour	Al Cane	368	18.2	
Green	Liz Swallow	228	11.3	
Labour	Steve Leniec	206	10.2	
Majority		424	11.0	
Turnout		2,046	34.90	
Liberal Democrats gain from Conservative		Swing		
Liberal Democrats gain from Conservative		Swing		

Grove North (2 seats)
Party	Candidate	Votes	%	±%
Liberal Democrats	Ron Batstone	605	49.5	
Liberal Democrats	Ruth Isabel Molyneaux	572	46.8	
Conservative	Ben Mabbett*	399	32.6	
Conservative	Chris McCarthy*	316	25.8	
Labour	Dave Gernon	158	12.9	
UKIP	Martin Freeman	151	12.3	
Majority		173	7.9	
Turnout		1,235	31.04	
Liberal Democrats gain from Conservative		Swing		
Liberal Democrats gain from Conservative		Swing		

Hendreds (1)
Party	Candidate	Votes	%	±%
Conservative	Janet Shelley	430	57.0	+4.9
Liberal Democrats	Richard Farrell	324	43.0	+31.8
Majority		106	14.1	
Turnout		773	33.92	
Conservative hold		Swing		

Kennington & Radley (2 seats)
Party	Candidate	Votes	%	±%
Liberal Democrats	Bob Johnston*	1,526	71.9	
Liberal Democrats	Diana Lugova	1,349	63.6	
Conservative	Ed Blagrove*	674	31.8	
Conservative	Julia Lorraine Reynolds	462	21.8	
Majority		675	16.8	
Turnout		2,158	42.99	
Liberal Democrats hold		Swing		
Liberal Democrats gain from Conservative		Swing		

Kingston Bagpuize (1 seat)
Party	Candidate	Votes	%	±%
Conservative	Eric Batts*	Unopposed		
Conservative hold				

Marcham (1)
Party	Candidate	Votes	%	±%
Liberal Democrats	Catherine Margaret Webber*	594	70.7	+22.1
Conservative	Dianna Rose Swale	246	29.3	−10.8
Majority		348	41.4	
Turnout		853	34.06	
Liberal Democrats hold		Swing		

Ridgeway (1)
Party	Candidate	Votes	%	±%
Liberal Democrats	Dr Paul Barrow	504	50.2	+30.5
Conservative	Amos Gordon Lundie	499	49.8	−15.6
Majority		5	0.5	
Turnout		1,035	41.97	
Liberal Democrats gain from Conservative		Swing		

Stanford (1)
Party	Candidate	Votes	%	±%
Conservative	Nathan Boyd	528	48.0	−11.1
Liberal Democrats	Philipa Grace Mugleston	218	19.8	+7.1
Green	Kevin Frederick Middleton	199	18.1	N/A
Labour	John Kenneth Williams	155	14.1	−14.1
Majority		310	28.2	
Turnout		1,132	39.86	
Conservative hold		Swing		

Steventon & the Hanneys (1)
Party	Candidate	Votes	%	±%
Conservative	Matthew Barber*	512	48.2	+1.4
Liberal Democrats	Jennie Corrigan	436	41.0	+27.8
UKIP	Peter Shields	115	10.8	−3.6
Majority		76	7.1	
Turnout		1,080	35.56	
Conservative hold		Swing		

Sutton Courtenay (1)
Party	Candidate	Votes	%	±%
Liberal Democrats	Richard John Webber	700	75.9	+63.5
Conservative	Christopher Charles Campbell	222	24.1	−23.7
Majority		478	51.8	
Turnout		935	39.07	
Liberal Democrats gain from Conservative		Swing		

Thames (1)
Party	Candidate	Votes	%	±%
Liberal Democrats	Jerry Avery	531	53.0	+24.4
Conservative	Anthony Robert Hayward	470	47.0	−23.2
Majority		61	6.1	
Turnout		1,023	39.05	
Liberal Democrats gain from Conservative		Swing		

Wantage & Grove Brook (2 seats)
Party	Candidate	Votes	%	±%
Liberal Democrats	Jenny Hannaby*	1,215	62.2	
Liberal Democrats	Amos Duveen	939	48.1	
Conservative	James Anthony Goodman	596	30.5	
Conservative	Peter Giles Henry Kirby-Harris	493	25.2	
Labour	Jean Elizabeth Nunn-Price	378	19.3	
Majority		343	9.5	
Turnout		1,977	34.36	
Liberal Democrats hold		Swing		
Liberal Democrats gain from Conservative		Swing		

Wantage Charlton (2 seats)
Party	Candidate	Votes	%	±%
Liberal Democrats	Andrew Crawford	1,163	60.5	
Liberal Democrats	Patrick Martin O'Leary	1,159	60.3	
Conservative	Charlotte Emma Carolyn Dixon*	541	28.1	
Conservative	Charles St John Dixon*	501	26.1	
Labour	Richard Francis Joseph Heron	270	14.0	
Majority		618	17.0	
Turnout		1,956	37.75	
Liberal Democrats gain from Conservative		Swing		
Liberal Democrats gain from Conservative		Swing		

Watchfield & Shrivenham (2 seats)
Party	Candidate	Votes	%	±%
Conservative	Elaine Linda Ware*	1,178	63.2	
Conservative	Simon Paul Howell*	1,133	60.8	
Liberal Democrats	Björn Hugh Henry Watson	472	25.3	
Liberal Democrats	Brian George Sadler	416	22.3	
Labour	Peter Stone	194	10.4	
Labour	James Sweeten	142	7.6	
Majority		661	18.7	
Turnout		1,897	34.50	
Conservative hold		Swing		
Conservative hold		Swing		

Wootton (1)
Party	Candidate	Votes	%	±%
Liberal Democrats	Val Shaw	646	62.2	+24.3
Conservative	Dina Black	393	37.8	−13.6
Majority		253	24.4	
Turnout		1,056	39.39	
Liberal Democrats gain from Conservative		Swing		

== Changes 2019–2023 ==
- By December 2019, Grove North councillor Ruth Molyneaux had left the Liberal Democrats to sit as an independent.

=== By-elections ===
==== Grove North ====
The Grove North by-election was triggered by the resignation of Ruth Molyneaux, who had been elected in 2019 as a Liberal Democrat but was sitting as an independent by the time she left the council.

Grove North by-election, 6 May 2021
Party	Candidate	Votes	%	±%
Conservative	Ben Mabbett	704	44.9	+12.3
Liberal Democrats	Andy Przybysz	575	36.7	−10.1
Labour	Marci Sandels	191	12.2	−0.7
Green	Viral Patel	98	6.3	N/A
Majority		129	8.2	
Turnout		1,585	34.5	
Conservative gain from Liberal Democrats		Swing	▲11.2	

==== Steventon & the Hanneys ====
The Steventon & the Hanneys by-election was triggered by the resignation of Conservative councillor Matthew Barber, who gave no reason for standing down.

Steventon & the Hanneys by-election, 5 May 2022
Party	Candidate	Votes	%	±%
Liberal Democrats	Sally Louise Povolotsky	878	55.1	+14.1
Conservative	Louise Brown	517	32.4	−15.8
Independent	David John Corps	199	12.5	N/A
Majority		361	22.7	
Turnout		1,597	49.6	
Liberal Democrats gain from Conservative		Swing	▲15.0	
