= Miss Naked Beauty =

2008 British reality television show

- Presented by: Gok Wan; Myleene Klass
- Starring: James Brown; Kathryn Flett; Mica Paris
- Country of origin: United Kingdom
- Original language: English
- No. of series: 1
- No. of episodes: 6

Production
- Editor: Sarah Edwards

Original release
- Network: Channel 4
- Release: 21 October – 28 November 2008

Related
- How to Look Good Naked 2008; How to Look Good Naked 2009

Miss Naked Beauty is a short-lived, six-episode 2008 reality television show produced by Maverick Television that aired on Channel 4 in the United Kingdom.

The show, presented by Gok Wan and Myleene Klass, was conceived as a radical "reality" take on beauty pageants. Some 7000 women applied to become the "ultimate 21st century beauty queen". The focus of the program is on natural and diverse beauty, as opposed to surgically "enhanced" and conformist concepts of beauty.

In the first episode, hundreds of remaining applicants were whittled down to just twelve finalists, by a panel of judges composed of fashion stylist Gok Wan, musician Myleene Klass, magazine editor James Brown, journalist Kathryn Flett and musician, actress and TV presenter Mica Paris. In subsequent episodes, various issues were explored such as body image, plastic surgery, self-esteem, modern versus Renaissance and earlier notions of beauty, eating disorders, over-reliance on makeup, the fashion industry. Meanwhile, the programme also progressed as a pageant, eliminating contestants in typical reality TV style, down to five finalists. Despite its name, the show only features brief nudity (mostly bare breasts), and should not be confused with nude pageants, such as Miss Exotic World.

The show sought a "natural-beauty campaigner" in the winner of the show. The lady crowned Miss Naked Beauty 2008 won the chance to write a magazine column about beauty, become the face of a new modelling agency and be a part of the 2009 series of Gok Wan's other show, How to Look Good Naked. The competition was won on 25 November 2008 by Shona Collins of London.

Aside from Shona, the final 12 contestants came from diverse backgrounds. They were Anna Jenkins (Student), Laura Milne (Solicitor and Employment Law specialist), Amy Dunn (Teacher), Denise Horsely (Dancer), Gemma Vittie (Car Saleswoman), Qlaudia Kelk (Mum), Dawn Hunter (Student), Natasha Crook (Model), Lucinda Richardson (Dental Student), Jo (Singer and Beautician) and Dalia Tweedy (Care Worker).
