= Baggage (American game show) =

American dating game show

- Genre: Dating game show
- Presented by: Jerry Springer
- Country of origin: United States
- Original language: English
- No. of seasons: Baggage: 3 Baggage on the Road: 1
- No. of episodes: Baggage: 300; Baggage on the Road: 20

Production
- Executive producers: Jay James (2010–12); Tim Puntillo (2010); Michael Binkow (2010–12); Lisa Tucker (2015)
- Production location: Sunset Bronson Studios
- Editor: Tony Kretzin
- Running time: 20–21 minutes
- Production companies: Comcast Entertainment Studios (2010–12); Wilshire Studios (2015)

Original release
- Network: Game Show Network
- Release: April 19, 2010 – June 1, 2012
- Release: January 7 – March 11, 2015

Related
- Baggage (British game show)

Baggage is an American dating game show hosted by Jerry Springer and broadcast on Game Show Network. The original series premiered on April 19, 2010, airing for four seasons. A spin-off series, entitled Baggage on the Road, aired for one season, which debuted on January 7, 2015. The show has earned high ratings by GSN's standards; despite this, it has also received mixed critical reception.

The series gives three contestants the chance to win the eye of a prospective date. The contestants each have three suitcases onstage: a small, medium, and large one. Each suitcase contains an embarrassing, gross, unique, or weird proposition the contestant may have. These cases represent the "baggage" to which they will confess and defend. As the suitcase size increases, so does the level of shame or embarrassment the secret carries. Once the three contestants are pared down to one, the potential dater must admit to a fault of their own.

== Gameplay ==
The game is played by first introducing the central character. Three contestants are then introduced, each accompanied by three pieces of baggage: a small one, a medium one, and a large one, with each one containing a corresponding secret. The central contestant also has a piece of baggage of their own, which is only revealed at the end of the show. During the show, three possible secrets about the central contestant are given, one of which is the actual secret contained in their baggage. These secrets can include bad habits, strange relationship preferences, issues with one's past, gross hygiene, or strange hobbies. After the three other contestants are introduced, they each open the smallest piece of baggage, and explain the secrets they contain, the bigger the baggage, the more embarrassing the secret is.

In the second segment, Springer reveals the second piece of baggage, contained in the medium-sized suitcase. The suitcases are placed in random order, so the central character does not know to whom each belongs. The three contestants are placed on the other side of the stage, along with the central contestant. Only the three contestants know which piece of baggage belongs to whom. The main contestant chooses the piece of baggage which is the "deal-breaker" (i.e., the one secret that they cannot accept). After stating this, the contestants then return to the other side of the stage and reveal which suitcase belongs to them. The person who claims the deal breaker baggage is immediately eliminated, and later backstage reveals the largest piece of baggage that would have been shown in the final round. The central contestant and two remaining contestants discuss the secrets in the medium pieces of baggage; the two contestants then plead their cases as to why they should be the central contestant's choice. Springer then asks the two remaining contestants, one at a time, a few questions (usually five or six each) about their personal lives.

The two contestants then open their largest pieces of baggage and reveal the secrets they contain. Each contestant makes one final statement, and the main contestant eliminates a second contestant. The main contestant's own baggage is then opened and the contents revealed to the remaining contestant. If the contestant accepts the secret belonging to the central character, the couple is given an expense-covered evening together. However, if the contestant cannot accept the secret, the pair parts ways.

== Production ==
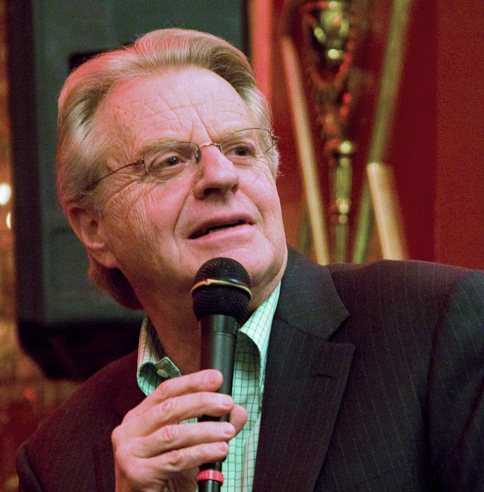
Host Jerry Springer in January 2011

The series was officially announced on March 23, 2010, with longtime Jerry Springer host Jerry Springer confirmed as the host. The original series was produced by Comcast Entertainment Group; Jay James and Tim Puntillo served as executive producers. On July 26, 2010, GSN announced plans to renew the show for a second season, which began airing on August 16, 2010. A syndication test run was shown on a select group of Sinclair Broadcast Group's stations on January 10, 2011. The series began airing in syndication in the United States in September 2012, becoming the first original program in the network's history to achieve such a feat.

A third season began airing on June 6, 2011. During season three, a half-hour special entitled Baggage First Dates aired during a five-hour "Best of Baggage Marathon." The special followed a couple who had previously appeared on the show talking to Springer about what happened on their first date following their appearance. A fourth season of the show was scheduled to premiere on March 14, 2012.

With GSN's Executive Vice President of Programming, Amy Introcaso-Davis, citing that the series continued to remain "extremely popular" in reruns, GSN announced plans to order twenty episodes of a traveling version of the series. The spin-off, entitled Baggage on the Road, follows an identical format to its predecessor while traveling to tape episodes in various U.S. cities. Prior to the spin-off, a one-hour special entitled Baggage: Most Outrageous Moments aired on January 1, 2015, featuring highlights from the original series' run. The spin-off premiered on January 7, 2015. Wilshire Studios produced the revival with Lisa Tucker serving as executive producer.

In 2025, producers from the original run of Baggage created a spin-off exclusively for YouTube called Red Flag Green Flag. Like in Baggage, contestants reveal three rounds of Red Flags. However, they also reveal their Green Flags, which are their best qualities. Red Flag Green Flag is hosted by Jessica Lowe and full episodes stream on Elixir.

== Reception ==
The show quickly became a ratings success for GSN, becoming the highest-rated weekday series in the network's history. The original series averaged 473,000 viewers during its first season, while the 2015 version saw a season-high of 524,000 viewers for its only season. Despite earning respectable ratings by GSN's standards, Baggage received mixed critical reviews. Carrie Grosvenor of About Entertainment argued that the series "isn't exactly must-see TV, but it's entertaining enough to catch an episode here and there." Additionally, Josef Adalian of The Wrap gave a negative pre-review of the show, calling it and Springer "GSN's latest bad idea." In 2012, however, Baggage appeared in Entertainment Weekly as a "top guilty pleasure", and was also featured in the HBO television series Girls. Writing for Yahoo!, Gabrielle Rice called the series "very entertaining", and argued Springer to be "the perfect host for the show." June Thomas, writing for Slate, opened her review by calling the series "real, and ... spectacular." Additionally, Jordan Carr of The Awl titled his review, "Jerry Springer's Baggage Is The Greatest TV Show Ever." Carr called the formula of the show "brilliant" despite it being "predictable and not that exciting."

== International versions ==
The series has also spawned Australian and British versions under the same title. The British series, hosted by Gok Wan, aired on Channel 4 in 2012. The Vietnamese version, Hành Lý Tình Yêu aired on VTV3 from 2020 to 2023.

Country	Local name	Host	Channel	Year aired
Australia	Baggage	?	?	?
Spain	¿Algo que declarar?	Pablo Chiapella	La 1	2025
United Kingdom	Baggage	Gok Wan	Channel 4	2012
Vietnam	Hành Lý Tình Yêu	Võ Thành Trung (2020–2021); Bùi Đại Nghĩa (2021–2022); Vũ Nguyễn Hà Anh (2022–2023)	VTV3	2020–2023
