= Matthew Barber =

Matthew Barber may refer to:

- Matthew Barber (singer-songwriter) (born 1977), Canadian singer-songwriter
- Matthew Barber (politician) (born 1981), British politician
- Matt Barber (actor) (born 1983), British actor
- Matt Barber (athlete) (1956–2020), Australian shot put champion and athletics coach
