= 1999 Vale of White Horse District Council election =

1999 UK local government election

Elections to Vale of White Horse District Council were held on 6 May 1999. The whole council was up for election and the Liberal Democrats stayed in overall control. The next full council elections took place on 1 May 2003.

== Election result ==
Vale of White Horse local election result 1999
Party	Seats	Gains	Losses	Net gain/loss	Seats %	Votes %	Votes	+/−
Liberal Democrats	33			-1	64.7			
Conservative	15			+4	29.4			
Labour	2			-4	3.9			
Independent	1			+1	2.0			
