= Raging Dragons =

The Raging Dragons is a dragon boat club based in London, UK. The club trains at the Docklands Sailing and Watersports Centre on the Isle of Dogs.

The club competes in the BDA League, with Open, Mixed, and Women's crews. The team has a number of members who currently paddle for the Great Britain national Dragon Boat team. Celebrity Gok Wan has paddled with Raging Dragons and the team featured in episode 4 of his Gok Cooks Chinese TV show on Channel 4. In 2012, the Raging Dragons paddled in the man-powered section of the flotilla in the Thames Diamond Jubilee Pageant. In 2012, the Raging Dragons supported the formation of Wave Walkers, London's first dragon boat team of cancer survivors.

== History ==
The club was formed in 2002, based at the Docklands Sailing and Watersports Centre in Millwall dock. It originally was a charity crew called "Chinese Professionals".
