= Gok Wan =

British fashion consultant, author, chef and television presenter (born 1974)

Gok Wan MBE
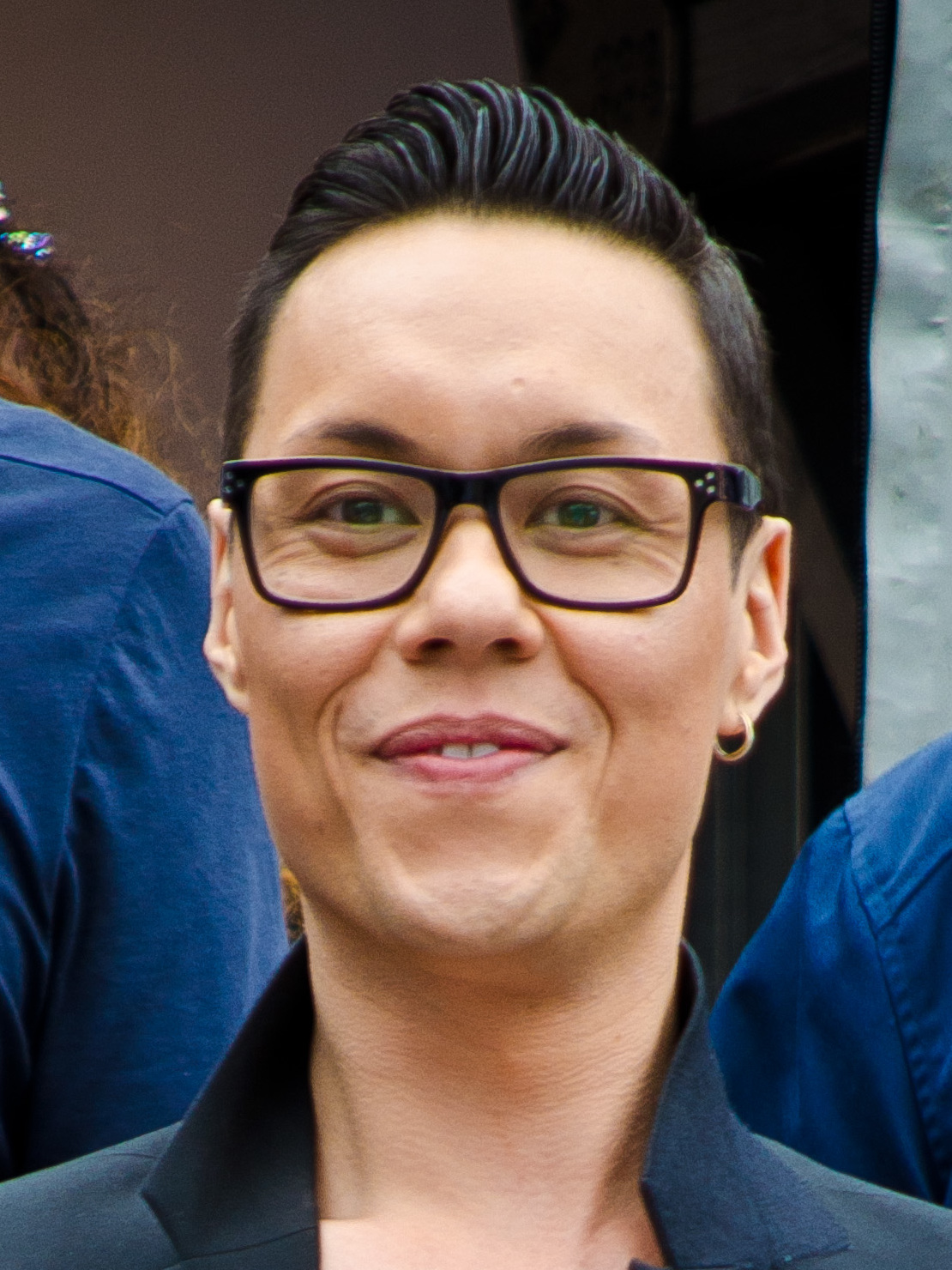
- Wan in 2012
- Born: 9 September 1974 (age 52); Leicester, England
- Education: Royal Central School of Speech and Drama
- Occupations: Television presenter, fashion stylist, author, DJ
- Years active: 1994–present
- Employer(s): BBC, Channel 4, ITV, Discovery, Bauer Media
- Television: How to Look Good Naked; Gok's Fashion Fix; Miss Naked Beauty; Gok's Clothes Roadshow; Gok Cooks Chinese; Baggage; This Morning; Gok's Fill Your House For Free; Gok's Chinese Takeaway; Say Yes to the Dress Lancashire
- Website: gokwan.com

Gok Wan MBE (simplified Chinese: 温国兴; traditional Chinese: 溫國興; pinyin: Wēn Guóxìng; Cantonese Yale: Wān Gwok-hīng; born 9 September 1974) is a British fashion consultant, author, television presenter, actor, DJ and chef.

Initially training in the performing arts at the Central School of Speech and Drama, he then entered the fashion business, writing for popular fashion magazines and appearing on various television shows. In 2006, Channel 4 employed him to present his own television show, How to Look Good Naked, which lasted for seven series, and Say Yes to the Dress Lancashire. Moving into other genres, he presented a series of documentaries on social problems among young people, drawing on his personal battles with obesity and homophobia, and presented Chinese cooking shows entitled Gok Cooks Chinese and Gok's Chinese Takeaway.

== Early life ==
Gok Wan was born in Leicester, to an English mother, Myra, and a Chinese father, John Tung Shing Wan, who was born in Hong Kong and emigrated to Britain at the age of 16. He grew up in Whetstone, Leicestershire, where he worked in his parents' restaurant. Wan stood out from his peers from a young age and endured bullying from other children due to the fact that he was mixed race, tall, overweight and gay.

During his teenage years, he weighed as much as 21 stone (133 kg, 294 lb). He was drawn to performing arts with aspirations of becoming an actor, and after leaving Babington Community College he began attending a course at the Charles Keene College of Further Education. Wan received a diploma from the college, then enrolled at the Central School of Speech and Drama and continued to study performing arts. However, the other students had backgrounds very different from his and he felt that his weight was beginning to dictate his life, later saying:

"[It affected] everything: my personality, how people reacted to me, what I wore, everything. When you sit down with someone who's 21 stone you have certain expectations of what they're like: stupid, lazy or really funny."

He felt restricted and unhappy and eventually dropped out of the course, returning to live with his family.

Wan set about losing weight; at the age of 20, he began a crash diet, losing half his weight in several months. In his autobiography he includes a section from a calorie diary he kept at the time, revealing he survived for weeks on end on as little as fruit and honey. He also took up to 50 laxatives a day to prevent himself gaining weight from the little food he did consume. Wan reveals that during his diet, he lacked energy and motivation; this, coupled with the stress of his course, sent him into depression. He states that he became suicidal around this time – "I fantasised about killing myself – I could see no other way out...I concluded that suicide was the only option." Wan never did attempt to kill himself, stating a fear that he would be unsuccessful and the attempt would be regarded as "just another failing". Upon dropping out of his course and returning home, he confessed his feelings to his family, and was diagnosed as suffering from anorexia by a doctor. Under the supervision of his family he began to eat more and slowly increased to a healthier weight. Despite the sudden change, he had no problem with having been overweight, later reflecting: "I don't regret having been fat at all. I know how to throw jokes at myself and I use humour before anything else, and those skills allow me to do the chat-shows. So I'm thankful for that." He even lamented that, after losing weight, he had to try harder to attract attention, saying that his weight had, to an extent, defined him.

== Career ==
Wan started his career in London as a makeup artist, then moved into the field of being a fashion stylist. He has worked with many celebrities including Bryan Ferry, All Saints, Damian Lewis, Erasure, Vanessa Mae, Wade Robson, Lauren Laverne, Wet Wet Wet, and Johnny Vaughan. He has offered his opinions to magazines, becoming a fashion consultant, and his work has been published internationally in several magazines including Tatler, Glamour, Times Style, Marie Claire, Cosmopolitan, The Face, Afisha Mir, Clash and People. He has worked with photographers such as Rankin, Mike Owen and Jason Joyce. He has also worked as an "on-screen" fashion consultant on many television shows including: MTV Shakedown (MTV Europe), GMTV (ITV), LK Today (ITV), Big Brother's Little Brother (Channel 4), Battle of the Sexes (BBC One), The Wright Stuff (Channel 5), Make Me a Grown Up (Channel 4/T4), The Xtra Factor (ITV2) and T4 (Channel 4).

In 2006, he was approached by Channel 4 and asked to present his own fashion show, How to Look Good Naked. In addition, he wrote his first book to accompany the series, entitled How to Look Good Naked: Shop for Your Shape and Look Amazing!, that was published in April 2007. A second series was commissioned and was broadcast on Channel 4 in mid-2007. Along with the second series, he appeared on The New Paul O'Grady Show, in which he persuaded Paul O'Grady to strip "naked". From 2008 until 2010, he presented Gok's Fashion Fix, broadcast on Channel 4.

His next series Miss Naked Beauty, which he co-presented with Myleene Klass, was broadcast in October and November 2008. The series attracted controversy after Wan denigrated semi-naked women, causing critics to question the motives behind the series; journalist Amanda Platell described it as "vulgarity masquerading as self-help".

Wan presented a documentary which was first broadcast on 27 January 2009, entitled Too Fat Too Young, which examined overweight children in the UK. He reflected on his experience of being obese to help several teenagers. In 2010, he joined the celebrity panel on Channel 4's TV Book Club.

In 2011, he presented a series entitled Gok's Clothes Roadshow on Channel 4, which was criticised for its gimmicks and similarities to Wan's previous shows. This was the year he also released his much anticipated autobiography, Through Thick and Thin, published by Ebury Press. He launched his first women's clothing collection with Sainsbury's on 6 November 2011. His red wrap dress sold at a rate of one every 24 seconds. The range ran into 24 collections and Wan was also their Style Ambassador. In 2012, he starred in a new series entitled Gok's Teens: The Naked Truth on Channel 4 where he gave advice to teenagers about self-confidence, bullying, anxiety and eating disorders.

In 2012, he presented a series entitled Gok Cooks Chinese on Channel 4 and later a book by the same title, Gok Cooks Chinese was published by Michael Joseph (Penguin Group UK). In autumn 2012, Wan presented Baggage, which was broadcast on Channel 4.

Between 2013 and 2015, Wan was the Style & Quality Ambassador for the Target Australia brand. As part of his role, he presented an Australian TV show titled Target Style the Nation, in which he transformed the appearances of five women. Wan's employer dismissed concerns about his use of the term "bangers" as a description for women's breasts in the brand's adverts.

In June 2014, Wan attended Royal Ascot for the first time as fashion presenter alongside racing presenter Clare Balding on Channel 4 Racing.

Wan was a regular stand-in presenter for Phillip Schofield on ITV's daytime show This Morning. He also presents various weekly fashion features, and travel documentaries, including a trip with his Dad to explore two different sides to Hong Kong, covering food, family and fashion.

In 2016, Wan presented Fearne and Gok – Off the Rails on ITVBe and Gok's Lunchbox on ITV. Since August 2016, Wan has presented Gok's Fill Your House for Free for Channel 4 daytime, replacing Kirstie Allsopp.

In 2017, National Geographic aired his show Gok's Chinese Takeaway, that explored Chinese food around the globe.

In 2017, Wan was a fashion expert on Made Over By on E4 and 2018 saw Wan as a panel member on Britain's Favourite Dogs: Top 100 on ITV.

In both 2016 and 2017, Wan was the Ambassador for the American Express campaign, "Shop Small" where he championed small independent shops and the importance of shopping with local businesses.

In 2018, Wan launched a company, Beautiful Events and Productions Ltd which offered high-end event management services – everything from creative production to logistics and event management. The new venture started after Wan and his business partner Peter Ferguson produced a 21-date tour around the UK and Ireland of Wan's show entitled 'Fashion Brunch Club' (2016/17). These shows are a live version of what Wan offered in his previous TV show How to Look Good Naked. The guests experience a 5 star Brunch, and catwalk show of clothes from their local clothing stores, along with a surprise audience makeover and Wan also provides a much coveted body-shape masterclass.

In 2018, Wan, along with co-founders Lucy Mitchell and Sarah Lewis, founded and launched the inaugural Golden Chopsticks Awards. The event took place on 16 April 2018, at the London Marriott Hotel, Grosvenor Square, London and Wan was host, with judges including Ken Hom, Simon Rimmer, Ching He Huang, Fuchsia Dunlop, Katy Tse Blair and Sonny Leong.

In March 2019, Wan began presenting Say Yes to the Dress Lancashire, which is the first Northern spin-off of the hit TV show, set in Ava Rose Hamilton in Colne, Lancashire. It was a family-run business where Wan became an honorary member of the family. Wan helped brides search for their dream dress, with a little input from their friends and family. A second series aired in 2020 on TLC UK.

Wan also filmed a brand new series of How to Look Good Naked, ten years after the last show aired on Channel 4. This new series for Discovery aired on Really in spring 2020 to much anticipation.

In 2021, Gok presented Gok Wan's Easy Asian (Series 2) and Series 3 in 2022 for the Food Network. Gok also presented Bling for ITV.

=== Author ===
Wan wrote a book titled How to Dress: Your Complete Style Guide for Every Occasion which was released by HarperCollins on 1 October 2008. The book was praised by both Heat and Closer magazines for its sensitive and feel-good approach to a style guide.

Other books by Gok include: Through Thick and Thin - Autobiography - 2011; Gok Cooks Chinese - 2012; Goks Wok - 2013; How To Look Good Naked - 2007.

=== Acting ===
Wan made his pantomime debut as the Man in the Mirror in Snow White and the Seven Dwarfs at Birmingham Hippodrome in 2013 and since then has starred as the Fairy Gokmother in Cinderella opposite Brian Conley at Mayflower Theatre, Southampton (2014) and Paul Zerdin at the Theatre Royal, Plymouth (2015). In 2016 he played the part of Spirit of The Ocean in Robinson Crusoe and the Caribbean Pirates at the Cliffs Pavilion, Southend-on-Sea. 2017 saw Wan reprising his role as Fairy Gokmother in Cinderella at the Milton Keynes Theatre. In 2018 Wan performed in Bristol in the production of Cinderella, and likewise in 2019 in Cardiff.

In May 2018, Wan took a job in the animated preschool series Luo Bao Bei, voicing the father and uncle of the main character. The show follows Luo Bao Bei, a bright and spirited seven-year-old girl with a vivid imagination, on a quest to understand the world around her. Viacom-owned UK terrestrial network Channel 5 picked up the series for its morning kids' block Milkshake!. This is a 52×11' series and was written by Dave Ingham (Shaun the Sheep, The Octonauts).

In 2021, Gok played the role of The Man in the Mirror in Snow White & The Seven Dwarfs at Woking New Victoria Theatre.

=== Music ===
Wan launched an opera compilation CD in March 2017 called Gok's Divas. It was well received and reached number one on the Official Classical Compilation charts.

Wan is a big music lover and regularly DJs in the UK and abroad. His preferred music is house music and club classics but enjoys playing a varied range. In 2017, he toured Poland including Pacha Nightclub in Poznań. He is represented by Club Class Management.

In September 2020, Wan released his debut single, a cover of the Baby D song Let Me Be Your Fantasy, with DJ/producer Craig Knight featuring Kele Le Roc on vocals.

Isolation Nation compilation CD released in 2020 with Defected. A second volume 2 CD compilation was released in 2021.

In December 2024, Gok produced a charity single with House Gospel Choir with profits going to Macmillan Cancer Support, in memory of his best friend Allison.

=== Stand-up ===
In the autumn of 2017, Wan embarked on an 18-date stand-up tour of the UK called Naked and Baring All. This was an auto-biographical show, where Wan discussed family, work, business, fashion and TV.

=== Fashion ===
Wan had a lingerie range at UK-based firm SimplyYours.

In 2019, Wan signed a deal with QVC to create a new collection called Wuli:Luu. Wan sold his range on the shopping channel.

In August 2024, Gok Wan was appointed brand ambassador for online fashion retailer JD Williams. The announcement followed a customer survey conducted by the company, which found that 44% of respondents were interested in receiving fashion advice from Wan. Survey participants cited his entertaining personality (55%), familiarity with his personal life (25%), relatability (16%), and general interest in his media presence (33%) as reasons for their preference. Additionally, many women surveyed described Wan as trendy (48%), stylish (45%), unique (44%), and inspirational (33%).

=== Radio ===
In January 2025, Wan joined Magic Radio as the full-time host of their weekday Breakfast Show alongside Harriet Scott.

== Personal life ==
Wan resides in Bloomsbury, London. In 2009, he said he had slept with "21 and a half" men in his life, and that he had also slept with women. In the same interview he also said he had lost his virginity to another boy while they were both under the legal age of consent.

His brother, Kwoklyn, is a martial artist and cook, who launched a Chinese takeaway cookbook in 2019. He also has an older sister, Oilen, who is a child-care solicitor.

Wan has been involved in various charitable projects, supporting anti-bullying charities Kidscape and Ditch the Label and launching a National Glasses Day with Specsavers to encourage everyone to wear their spectacles with pride. As part of Children in Need 2008, he treated the actors of Coronation Street's Underworld factory to a glamorous makeover. Wan also appeared in Comic Relief Does The Apprentice in March 2009. In 2014, he was named in the top 10 on the World Pride Power list. He is also a supporter and ambassador to Stonewall, and The King's Trust, and is an active member of the Chinese community in London and the UK.

Wan has taken part in dragon boat training with the Raging Dragons, and episode 3 of Gok Cooks Chinese features them paddling together in Royal Albert Dock and eating dim sum at the Yiban Chinese restaurant.

== Filmography ==
Year	Title	Role	Channel
2006–2011; 2019–present	How to Look Good Naked	Presenter	Channel 4 Really
2008	Miss Naked Beauty	Presenter	Channel 4
2008–2010	Gok's Fashion Fix	Presenter	Channel 4
2009	Gok Wan: Too Fat, Too Young	Presenter	Channel 4
2010	TV Book Club	Presenter	Channel 4
2010	Sex and the City Premiere Special	Panel member	
2011	Gok's Clothes Roadshow	Presenter	Channel 4
2012	Gok's Style Secrets	Presenter	Channel 4
2012	Hotel GB	Bar manager	Channel 4
2012	Baggage	Presenter	Channel 4
2012	Gok Cooks Chinese	Presenter	Channel 4
2012	Made in China	Presenter	Channel 4
2012	Gok's Teens: The Naked Truth	Presenter	Channel 4
2013	Celebrity Deal or No Deal	Contestant, won 10p	Channel 4
2014	Channel 4 Royal Ascot	Fashion segment presenter	Channel 4
2014	This Morning	Fashion expert & stand-in presenter	ITV
2014	Target Style The Nation	Fashion expert & presenter	Seven Network
2016	Fearne & Gok: Off The Rails	Co-presenter, with Fearne Cotton	ITVBe
2016	Gok's Lunchbox	Presenter	ITV
2016	Gok's Fill Your House for Free	Presenter	Channel 4
2017	Made Over By	Fashion Expert	E4
2017	Gok's Chinese Takeaway	Presenter	National Geographic
2018	Britain's Favourite Dogs: Top 100	Panel member	ITV
2018	Luo Bao Bei	Voice of Luo Bao Bei's father	Channel 5
2019	Say Yes to the Dress Poland	Presenter	TVN (Polish TV channel)
2019	This Morning	Presenting various fashion items	ITV
2019	Can I Improve My Memory	Contestant	Channel 4
2019	Say Yes to the Dress Lancashire (Series 1)	Presenter	TLC
2019	Say Yes to the Dress Lancashire (Series 2 end of 2019 & start of 2020)	Presenter	TLC
2020	Gok Wan's Easy Asian	Presenter	Food Network
2020	How To Look Good Naked	Presenter	Really
2020	This Morning	Presenting various fashion items	ITV
2020	Say Yes to the Dress Lancashire (Series 2)	Presenter	TLC
2020	Celebrity Snoop Dogs at Christmas	Presenter	Channel 4
2020	Pointless	Contestant	BBC One
2020	Michael McIntyre's The Wheel	Fashion Expert	BBC One
2020	Gok Wan's Fabulous Christmas 50	Presenter	MTV (British and Irish TV channel)
2021	Gok Wan's Easy Asian (Series 2)	Presenter	Food Network
2021	Bling	Presenter	ITV
2022	Gok Wan's Easy Asian (Series 3)	Presenter	Food Network

== Honours ==
Wan was awarded an honorary degree in fashion from Birmingham City University in 2014.

He was appointed Member of the Order of the British Empire (MBE) in the 2020 New Year Honours for services to fashion and social awareness.
