= Baggage (British game show) =

2012 British game show

- Presented by: Gok Wan
- Country of origin: United Kingdom
- Original language: English
- No. of series: 1
- No. of episodes: 8

Production
- Running time: 46−48 minutes
- Production company: Chocolate Media

Original release
- Network: Channel 4
- Release: 21 September – 17 November 2012

Baggage is a British television game show based on the American programme of the same name. The series, hosted by Gok Wan, premiered on Channel 4 on 21 September 2012.

== Gameplay ==
Similar to the American version, the series features three single contestants who reveal secrets about themselves to a central prospective dater, who eliminates contestants with the baggage he or she deems most unbearable. Once the contestants are narrowed down to one, the main contestant must reveal a secret of his or her own.

== Production ==
Channel 4 ordered a series pilot on 23 February 2012; Wan was announced as host on 5 July 2012.

== Reception ==
Kevin O'Sullivan of Daily Mirror gave the series a negative review, calling it "atrocious" and a "barrel-scraping programme that’s fun for none of the family."
