= 2015 Vale of White Horse District Council election =

2015 UK local government election

Results of the 2015 Vale of White Horse District Council election

The 2015 Vale of White Horse District Council election took place on 7 May 2015 to elect members of Vale of White Horse District Council in England. This was held on the same day as other local elections. In 2015, the council seats were contested against redrawn ward boundaries. The whole council was up for election and the Conservatives retained control, with an increased majority of seats.

== Election results ==
Composition of the council following the 2015 election was:

- Conservative 29
- Liberal Democrat 9

Vale of White Horse local election result 2015
Party	Seats	Gains	Losses	Net gain/loss	Seats %	Votes %	Votes	+/−
Conservative	29	N/A	N/A	-	76.3	45.6	48,057	
Liberal Democrats	9	N/A	N/A	-	23.7	32.1	33,829	
Labour	0	N/A	N/A	-	0.0	8.7	9,183	
UKIP	0	N/A	N/A	-	0.0	4.7	4,998	
Green	0	N/A	N/A	-	0.0	4.3	4,572	
Rural Oxfordshire Action Rally - ROAR	0	N/A	N/A	-	0.0	2.1	2,181	
Labour Co-op	0	N/A	N/A	-	0.0	1.7	1,802	
Independent	0	N/A	N/A	-	0.0	0.5	520	
NHA	0	N/A	N/A	-	0.0	0.2	240	

== Ward results ==
Abingdon Abbey Northcourt (2)
Party	Candidate	Votes	%	±%
Conservative	Katie Finch	1,302	22.28	
Liberal Democrats	Helen Pighills	1,125	19.25	
Liberal Democrats	Tony De Vere	1,086	18.58	
Conservative	Dennis Garrett	1,012	17.31	
Green	Tobias Fett	685	11.72	
Labour	Mike Gould	635	10.86	
Turnout				
Conservative win (new seat)				
Liberal Democrats win (new seat)				

Abingdon Caldecott (2)
Party	Candidate	Votes	%	±%
Conservative	Alice Badcock	1,285	20.89	
Conservative	Mike Badcock	1,204	19.58	
Liberal Democrats	Samantha Bowring	1,073	17.45	
Liberal Democrats	Neil Fawcett	929	15.11	
Labour	George Ryall	556	9.04	
UKIP	Jake Smith	500	8.13	
Green	Halima Brewer	458	7.45	
Rural Oxfordshire Action Rally - ROAR	Katherine Imogen Burton	94	1.53	
Rural Oxfordshire Action Rally - ROAR	James Alexander Sweeten	51	0.83	
Turnout				
Conservative win (new seat)				
Conservative win (new seat)				

Abingdon Dunmore (2)
Party	Candidate	Votes	%	±%
Conservative	Sandy Lovatt	1,455	22.96	
Liberal Democrats	Margaret Louise Crick	1,298	20.49	
Conservative	Andy Todd	1,285	20.28	
Liberal Democrats	Pat Lonergan	1,093	17.25	
Green	Richard Bullock	503	7.94	
Labour	Bobbie Nichols	473	7.47	
Rural Oxfordshire Action Rally - ROAR	Jonathan Charles Bowden	146	2.30	
Rural Oxfordshire Action Rally - ROAR	Anthony Bryant Patrick Mockler	83	1.31	
Turnout				
Conservative win (new seat)				
Liberal Democrats win (new seat)				

Abingdon Fitzharris (2)
Party	Candidate	Votes	%	±%
Conservative	Monica Lovatt	1,372	22.53	
Conservative	Chris Palmer	1,297	21.30	
Liberal Democrats	Jeanette Anita Halliday	1,160	19.05	
Liberal Democrats	Jim Halliday	1,052	17.27	
Labour	David Thomas Bartlett	689	11.31	
Independent	Marilyn Diana Badcock	520	8.54	
Turnout				
Conservative win (new seat)				
Conservative win (new seat)				

Abingdon Peachcroft (2)
Party	Candidate	Votes	%	±%
Conservative	Robert Hall	1,545	20.64	
Conservative	Vicky Jenkins	1,514	20.22	
Liberal Democrats	Alison Rosemary Rooke	1,407	18.79	
Liberal Democrats	Andrew John Skinner	1,126	15.04	
UKIP	Jim Abram	561	7.49	
Labour	Denise Marie Watt	444	5.93	
Green	Michael Wallace Ellwood	358	4.78	
Green	Paul Timothy Norton	292	3.90	
NHA	Tim Oates	240	3.21	
Turnout				
Conservative win (new seat)				
Conservative win (new seat)				

Blewbury & Harwell (2)
Party	Candidate	Votes	%	±%
Conservative	Reg Waite	1,490	25.74	
Conservative	Janet Shelley	1,457	25.17	
Liberal Democrats	Piran Fletcher	833	14.39	
Labour	Sonny Leong	737	12.73	
UKIP	Jake Smith	572	9.88	
Rural Oxfordshire Action Rally - ROAR	Tanya Louise Nunn	399	6.89	
Rural Oxfordshire Action Rally - ROAR	Andrew Charles Toombs	301	5.20	
Turnout				
Conservative win (new seat)				
Conservative win (new seat)				

Botley & Sunningwell (2)
Party	Candidate	Votes	%	±%
Liberal Democrats	Debby Hallett	1,521	25.55	
Liberal Democrats	Emily Smith	1,387	23.30	
Conservative	Jackie Gibb	1,106	18.58	
Conservative	Adam Hardiman	893	15.00	
Labour	Peter Joseph McGunnigle	643	10.80	
UKIP	Colin Albert Weyer	403	6.77	
Turnout				
Liberal Democrats win (new seat)				
Liberal Democrats win (new seat)				

Cumnor (2)
Party	Candidate	Votes	%	±%
Liberal Democrats	Judy Roberts	1,778	25.60	
Liberal Democrats	Dudley Hoddinott	1,679	24.17	
Conservative	Julian Wheatland	1,276	18.37	
Conservative	Adam Hardiman	1,134	16.33	
Labour	Bella Bond	383	5.51	
UKIP	Roy Allan Alderson	364	5.24	
Labour	James Stefan Hutton	332	4.78	
Turnout				
Liberal Democrats win (new seat)				
Liberal Democrats win (new seat)				

Drayton (1)
Party	Candidate	Votes	%	±%
Conservative	Stuart Davenport	654	37.83	
Liberal Democrats	Richard John Webber	614	35.51	
UKIP	John Richard Ayres	210	12.15	
Labour	Chris Lynch	172	9.95	
Rural Oxfordshire Action Rally - ROAR	Gerald Day	79	4.57	
Turnout				
Conservative win (new seat)				

Faringdon (2)
Party	Candidate	Votes	%	±%
Conservative	Roger Cox	1,619	25.29	
Conservative	Mohinder Kainth	1,429	22.32	
Liberal Democrats	Alex Meredith	1,105	17.26	
Labour	Steve Leniec	870	13.59	
Liberal Democrats	Mark Foggitt Harrison	797	12.45	
Green	Steven James Curd	582	9.09	
Turnout				
Conservative win (new seat)				
Conservative win (new seat)				

Grove North (2)
Party	Candidate	Votes	%	±%
Conservative	Chris McCarthy	982	21.54	
Conservative	Ben Mabbett	960	21.06	
Liberal Democrats	Sue Marchant	890	19.52	
Liberal Democrats	June Margaret Stock	696	15.27	
UKIP	Jason Kent	548	12.02	
Labour	Leon Mark Foster-Hill	483	10.59	
Turnout				
Conservative win (new seat)				
Conservative win (new seat)				

Hendreds (1)
Party	Candidate	Votes	%	±%
Conservative	Mike Murray	830	52.14	
Labour	Stephen Edwin Dominic Webb	401	25.19	
Rural Oxfordshire Action Rally - ROAR	Susan Linda Jennings	183	11.49	
Liberal Democrats	Christopher Carrigan	178	11.18	
Turnout				
Conservative win (new seat)				

Kennington & Radley (2)
Party	Candidate	Votes	%	±%
Liberal Democrats	Bob Johnston	1,751	25.98	
Conservative	Edward Blagrove	1,508	22.37	
Conservative	Gareth Jennings	1,254	18.60	
Liberal Democrats	Jerry Wayne Patterson	1,060	15.72	
Green	Christopher Roy Henderson	484	7.18	
Labour	Phil Bloomer	394	5.84	
Labour	Ruth Catherine Mayne	290	4.30	
Turnout				
Liberal Democrats win (new seat)				
Conservative win (new seat)				

Kingston Bagpuize (1)
Party	Candidate	Votes	%	±%
Conservative	Eric Batts	1,251	65.60	
Liberal Democrats	Richard Farrell	656	34.40	
Turnout				
Conservative win (new seat)				

Marcham (1)
Party	Candidate	Votes	%	±%
Liberal Democrats	Catherine Margaret Webber	723	48.59	
Conservative	Shaun Ward	597	40.12	
Rural Oxfordshire Action Rally - ROAR	Murray MacLean	168	11.29	
Turnout				
Liberal Democrats win (new seat)				

Ridgeway (1)
Party	Candidate	Votes	%	±%
Conservative	Yvonne Constance	1,182	65.41	
Liberal Democrats	Brian George Sadler	356	19.70	
Labour	Rowan Thomas Trevarthan Pearce	269	14.89	
Turnout				
Conservative win (new seat)				

Stanford (1)
Party	Candidate	Votes	%	±%
Conservative	Robert Sharp	1,190	59.09	
Labour	Peter Gill	568	28.20	
Liberal Democrats	Rosalind Margaret Moger Farrell	256	12.71	
Turnout				
Conservative win (new seat)				

Steventon & the Hanneys (1)
Party	Candidate	Votes	%	±%
Conservative	Matthew Barber	891	46.80	
UKIP	Glynn Allen Davies	275	14.44	
Rural Oxfordshire Action Rally - ROAR	Gwendoline Mary Marsh	270	14.18	
Liberal Democrats	Eileen Barbara Young	252	13.24	
Labour	Mark George William Sandels	269	11.34	
Turnout				
Conservative win (new seat)				

Sutton Courtenay (1)
Party	Candidate	Votes	%	±%
Conservative	Gervase Duffield	745	47.76	
Labour	Coral Ann Avril Florey	281	18.01	
UKIP	Chris Parkes	229	14.68	
Liberal Democrats	John Hudson	202	12.95	
Rural Oxfordshire Action Rally - ROAR	Olive Helen Lovelady	103	6.60	
Turnout				
Conservative win (new seat)				

Thames (1)
Party	Candidate	Votes	%	±%
Conservative	Anthony Hayward	1,232	60.16	
Liberal Democrats	John Stanley Woodford	586	28.61	
UKIP	John Frederick Curtis	230	11.23	
Turnout				
Conservative win (new seat)				

Wantage Charlton (2)
Party	Candidate	Votes	%	±%
Conservative	Charlotte Dickson	1,602	25.86	
Conservative	St John Dickson	1,275	20.58	
Liberal Democrats	Patrick O'Leary	955	15.41	
Labour	Terry Jean Cornford	617	9.96	
Green	Kevin Harris	609	9.83	
Liberal Democrats	James Sibbald	576	9.30	
UKIP	Frances Baxter	562	9.07	
Turnout				
Conservative win (new seat)				
Conservative win (new seat)				

Wantage & Grove Brook (2)
Party	Candidate	Votes	%	±%
Liberal Democrats	Jenny Hannaby	1,411	22.05	
Conservative	Julia Reynolds	1,385	21.64	
Conservative	Bill Jones	1,292	20.19	
Labour	Jean Elizabeth Nunn-Price	780	12.19	
Liberal Democrats	Ian Weeden	684	10.69	
UKIP	Doug Tofte	544	8.50	
Rural Oxfordshire Action Rally - ROAR	Trevor Cook	158	2.47	
Rural Oxfordshire Action Rally - ROAR	Christine Margaret Woodward	146	2.28	
Turnout				
Liberal Democrats win (new seat)				
Conservative win (new seat)				

Watchfield & Shrivenham (2)
Party	Candidate	Votes	%	±%
Conservative	Elaine Ware	2,319	35.93	
Conservative	Simon Howell	2,213	34.28	
Green	Mary Ellen Wiltshire	601	9.31	
Labour	Evelyne Godfrey	539	8.35	
Liberal Democrats	Paul William Mayhew Archer	393	6.09	
Liberal Democrats	Sophie Catherine Webber	390	6.04	
Turnout				
Conservative win (new seat)				
Conservative win (new seat)				

Wootton (1)
Party	Candidate	Votes	%	±%
Conservative	Henry Spencer	1,020	51.41	
Liberal Democrats	Mark Nicholas Fysh	751	37.85	
Labour	Joe Ottaway	213	10.74	
Turnout				
Conservative win (new seat)				
