= Matthew Barber (politician) =

Police and Crime Commissioner

Thames Valley Police and Crime Commissioner
- Incumbent
- Assumed office 13 May 2021
- Preceded by: Anthony Stansfield

Thames Valley Deputy Police and Crime Commissioner
- In office 16 December 2016 – 12 May 2021

Leader of Vale of White Horse District Council
- In office 2011–2018
- Preceded by: Tony de Vere
- Succeeded by: Roger Cox

Councillor for Steventon and the Hanneys (Faringdon and the Coxwells 2003-2015)
- In office May 2003 – 14 March 2022
- Succeeded by: Sally Povolotsky

Personal details
- Born: 16 February 1981 (age 45)
- Party: Conservative
- Website: www.matthewbarber.co.uk

Matthew David Barber (born 16 February 1981) is a British politician. He is currently Thames Valley Police and Crime Commissioner. He previously served as Leader of the Council on Vale of White Horse District Council and Deputy Police and Crime Commissioner for the Thames Valley Police.

== Political career ==
Matthew Barber was first elected to Vale of White Horse District Council on 1 May 2003 as Councillor for the Faringdon & The Coxwells Ward. Whilst the Conservatives were in opposition he became Group Whip and subsequently opposition finance spokesman. In 2004 he was elected unopposed to Faringdon Town Council. He was re-elected to the District Council in 2007.

In 2009 Barber became Leader of the Opposition following the resignation of Melinda Tilley as Conservative Group Leader. Following his marriage in 2010 he moved to West Hanney and stood for election in the Hanneys Ward. At the 2011 local elections the Conservatives took control of the District Council and Barber became Leader of the council.

As leader of the Vale of White Horse District Council he has been nominated as a Director of the Oxfordshire Local Enterprise Partnership. Barber is also Chairman of the Vale4Business partnership as well as being a member of other organisations such as the Oxfordshire Growth Board, which seeks to deliver significant housing and economic growth across Oxfordshire.

In late 2016 the Thames Valley Police & Crime Commissioner, Anthony Stansfeld, announced the appointment of Barber as Deputy Police and Crime Commissioner.

=== Unitary authority debate ===
As Council Leader, Barber was amongst five district council leaders to launch a controversial proposal for unitary authorities in Oxfordshire. With the backing of the then Prime Minister David Cameron the District Council leaders proposed the abolition of Oxfordshire County Council and its replacement with a series of smaller unitary authorities.

== Personal life ==
Barber spent his early life in Faringdon, Oxfordshire. He was educated at Ferndale School and Cokethorpe School in Oxfordshire before reading Politics & Philosophy at Brunel University in Middlesex. After graduating from university he worked briefly for John Randall, then Member of Parliament for Uxbridge before returning to Oxfordshire.

Barber lives in the village of West Hanney, near Wantage, with his wife, Katie and their two young children, Emily & Lucy.

== Elections contested ==
Year	Constituency	Party	Votes	% votes	Position	Ref.
2003 Vale of White Horse District Council election	Faringdon and the Coxwells	Conservative	891	44.6	Won	
2007 Vale of White Horse District Council election	Faringdon and the Coxwells	Conservative	1,272	62.1	Won	
2011 Vale of White Horse District Council election	Hanneys	Conservative	626	66.5	Won	
2015 Vale of White Horse District Council election	Steventon & the Hanneys	Conservative	891	46.8	Won	
2019 Vale of White Horse District Council election	Steventon & the Hanneys	Conservative	512	48.2	Won	
2021 Thames Valley Police and Crime Commissioner election	Thames Valley	Conservative	313,148	57.29	Won	
2024 Thames Valley Police and Crime Commissioner election	Thames Valley	Conservative	144,092	32.1	Won	
