= Gok Cooks Chinese =

- Genre: Cooking
- Starring: Gok Wan
- Country of origin: United Kingdom
- Original language: English
- No. of series: 1
- No. of episodes: 6

Production
- Running time: 30 minutes
- Production company: Optomen

Original release
- Network: Channel 4
- Release: 21 May – 25 June 2012

Gok Cooks Chinese is a six-part Chinese cookery programme presented by Gok Wan. Over the course of the series he teaches home cooking of typical quick and healthy Chinese meals, often with the help of his father. The show was broadcast on Channel 4 in the United Kingdom in 2012.

== Episodes ==
The six episodes are:

- Episode 1: Chinese Classics: Wan shows viewers the simple basics of Chinese cooking and demonstrates how to cook the perfect egg-fried rice in 5 minutes. Originally broadcast 21 May 2012.
- Episode 2: Family Favourites: Wan and his father cook dragon scallops in burning oil sauce, pork and ginger soup and a soy-glazed chicken with spicy cucumber salad. Originally broadcast 28 May 2012.
- Episode 3: Traditional: Wan cooks some traditional Chinese dishes, including steamed lemon sole. He visits the kitchens of the Chinese Embassy. Originally broadcast 4 June 2012.
- Episode 4: Dim Sum: Wan cooks dim sum - minced chicken, ginger and finely chopped leek in wonton wrappers, salt pork ribs and black beans, and squid with cucumber salad. He paddles with the Raging Dragons and enjoys dim sum with them. Originally broadcast 11 June 2012.
- Episode 5: Street Food: Wan creates dishes usually served as street food in China, such as lamb and cucumber kebabs and beef noodle soup. Originally broadcast 18 June 2012.
- Episode 6: Celebration Feast: Wan cooks a Chinese celebratory feast, including sea bass with ginger and spring onions, melting pork, and Chinese chicken wrapped in lettuce leaves. Originally broadcast 25 June 2012.

== Ratings ==
Episode	Episode theme	Broadcast date	Ratings	Weekly channel rank
1	Chinese Classics	21 May 2012	1.51m	8
2	Family Favourites	28 May 2012	1.15m	23
3	Traditional	4 June 2012	Under 0.97m	Outside Top 30
4	Dim Sum	11 June 2012	Under 1.07m	Outside Top 30
5	Street Food	18 June 2012	Under 1.17m	Outside Top 30
6	Celebration Feast	25 June 2012	Under 1.16m	Outside Top 30
