= 2003 Vale of White Horse District Council election =

2003 UK local government election

Results of the 2003 Vale of White Horse District Council election

Elections to Vale of White Horse District Council were held on 1 May 2003. The whole council was up for election with boundary changes having taken place since the last election in 1999. The Liberal Democrats lost seats, but stayed in overall control of the council.

== Election result ==
Vale of White Horse local election result 2003
Party	Seats	Gains	Losses	Net gain/loss	Seats %	Votes %	Votes	+/−
Liberal Democrats	29			-4	56.9	46.1	25,848	
Conservative	21			+6	41.2	42.2	23,670	
Independent	1	0	0	0	2.0	0.08	425	
Labour	0	0	2	-2	0.0	9.5	5,326	
Green	0	0	0	0	0.0	1.4	810	

== Ward results ==
Abingdon, Abbey and Barton
Party	Candidate	Votes	%	±%
Liberal Democrats	Julie Mayhew-Archer	651		
Liberal Democrats	Anthony De Vere	617		
Conservative	Robert Burrage	310		
Conservative	Michael How	283		
Labour	Leslie Clyne	123		
Majority				
Turnout				

Abingdon, Caldecott
Party	Candidate	Votes	%	±%
Liberal Democrats	Paul Bizzell	347		
Liberal Democrats	Mary De Vere	344		
Conservative	Jonathan Godwin	193		
Conservative	Charles Parry	182		
Labour	David Banner	139		
Labour	Benjamin Woodham	137		
Majority				
Turnout				

Abingdon, Dunmore
Party	Candidate	Votes	%	±%
Liberal Democrats	Janet Morgan	705		
Conservative	Peter Jones	666		
Conservative	Alexander Lovatt	659		
Liberal Democrats	Mark Richmond	637		
Labour	Clive Crowden	149		
Majority				
Turnout				

Abingdon, Fitzharris
Party	Candidate	Votes	%	±%
Liberal Democrats	Richard Gibson	576		
Conservative	Monica Lovatt	552		
Conservative	David Calvert	543		
Liberal Democrats	Jeanette Halliday	531		
Labour	Marjorie McLellan	124		
Labour	Barbara Wynn	122		
Green	Dorothy Giacomin	95		
Majority				
Turnout				

Abingdon, Northcourt
Party	Candidate	Votes	%	±%
Liberal Democrats	James Halliday	681		
Liberal Democrats	Laurel Symons	674		
Conservative	David Bowsher	353		
Conservative	Shaun Salter	337		
Labour	Denise Watt	181		
Labour	Alan Downe	171		
Majority				
Turnout				

Abingdon, Ock Meadow
Party	Candidate	Votes	%	±%
Conservative	Michael Badcock	599		
Liberal Democrats	Peter Green	596		
Liberal Democrats	Samantha Bowring	557		
Conservative	Andrew McLernan	532		
Labour	Catherine Dallal	109		
Labour	Brian Jeffries	96		
Majority				
Turnout				

Appleton and Cumnor
Party	Candidate	Votes	%	±%
Liberal Democrats	Derek Rawson	1,013		
Liberal Democrats	Harry Dickinson	886		
Liberal Democrats	John Woodford	828		
Conservative	John Allen-Stevens	585		
Conservative	Stephan Pritchard	563		
Conservative	James Barraclough	495		
Green	Anne-Marie Heslop	270		
Labour	James Hutton	219		
Majority				
Turnout				

Blewbury and Upton
Party	Candidate	Votes	%	±%
Liberal Democrats	Richard Farrell	489		
Conservative	Kenneth Howard	201		
Labour	Christopher Lakeland	75		
Majority				
Turnout				

Craven
Party	Candidate	Votes	%	±%
Conservative	Yvonne Constance	522		
Liberal Democrats	John Tamplin	138		
Labour	James Douglas	91		
Majority				
Turnout				

Drayton
Party	Candidate	Votes	%	±%
Liberal Democrats	Grahame Ash	340	66.9	
Conservative	Rosemary Packer	168	33.1	
Majority		172	33.8	
Turnout		508		

Faringdon and the Coxwells
Party	Candidate	Votes	%	±%
Conservative	Matthew Barber	891		
Conservative	Alison Thomson	852		
Conservative	Roger Cox	799		
Liberal Democrats	Jennifer Braithwaite	719		
Liberal Democrats	Genevieve Webb	650		
Liberal Democrats	Hilary Taylor	592		
Labour	Mohammed Yaqub	390		
Labour	Stephen Leniec	360		
Labour	Michael Ilott	350		
Majority				
Turnout				

Greendown
Party	Candidate	Votes	%	±%
Liberal Democrats	Andrew Crawford	441		
Conservative	Anthony Hayward	273		
Labour	Stuart Taylor	106		
Majority				
Turnout				

Grove
Party	Candidate	Votes	%	±%
Conservative	David Phillips	787		
Conservative	Pamela Westwood	735		
Conservative	Virginia Stock	716		
Liberal Democrats	Zoe Patrick	698		
Liberal Democrats	Susan Marchant	596		
Liberal Democrats	Rosalind Hicks-Greene	566		
Labour	William Ackers	176		
Labour	Roland Bashford	174		
Labour	Pamela Thompson	135		
Majority				
Turnout				

Hanneys
Party	Candidate	Votes	%	±%
Conservative	Terence Cox	489		
Liberal Democrats	Paul Rollings	201		
Labour	Margaret Ward	51		
Majority				
Turnout				

Harwell
Party	Candidate	Votes	%	±%
Conservative	Margaret Turner	765		
Conservative	Richard Stone	698		
Liberal Democrats	Angela Lawrence	234		
Labour	Helen Walter	221		
Liberal Democrats	David Allinson	213		
Majority				
Turnout				

Hendreds
Party	Candidate	Votes	%	±%
Liberal Democrats	Terence Fraser	464		
Independent	John Dunsdon	425		
Liberal Democrats	Bogdan Nedelkoff	406		
Conservative	Michael Murray	374		
Majority				
Turnout				

Kennington and South Hinksey
Party	Candidate	Votes	%	±%
Liberal Democrats	Jerry Patterson	770		
Liberal Democrats	Sylvia Patterson	765		
Conservative	Gareth Jennings	480		
Conservative	Denis Standen	426		
Labour	Stephanie Brown	118		
Majority				
Turnout				

Kingston Bagpuize with Southmoor
Party	Candidate	Votes	%	±%
Conservative	Melinda Tilley	383		
Liberal Democrats	Catherine Chater	157		
Labour	John Matthews	53		
Majority				
Turnout				

Longworth
Party	Candidate	Votes	%	±%
Conservative	Elsa Boyce	480		
Liberal Democrats	Josephine Gaberscik	117		
Labour	Geoffrey Beer	73		
Majority				
Turnout				

Marcham and Shippon
Party	Candidate	Votes	%	±%
Liberal Democrats	Jane Hanna	447		
Conservative	Cyril Rudge	320		
Majority				
Turnout				

North Hinksey and Wytham
Party	Candidate	Votes	%	±%
Liberal Democrats	Briony Newport	753		
Liberal Democrats	David Quinlan	615		
Conservative	Eric Batts	473		
Conservative	Ann Dykes	453		
Green	Robert Cowley	198		
Majority				
Turnout				

Radley
Party	Candidate	Votes	%	±%
Liberal Democrats	Robin Johnston	487		
Conservative	Jennifer Standen	240		
Labour	Lisa Smyth	49		
Green	Dominique Henderson	42		
Majority				
Turnout				

Shrivenham
Party	Candidate	Votes	%	±%
Conservative	Peter Saunders	632		
Conservative	Clare Saunders	621		
Liberal Democrats	Bjorn Watson	470		
Liberal Democrats	John Howson	357		
Majority				
Turnout				

Stanford
Party	Candidate	Votes	%	±%
Conservative	Robert Sharp	367		
Labour	Peter Gill	225		
Liberal Democrats	Anthea Beszant	67		
Majority				
Turnout				

Sunningwell and Wootton
Party	Candidate	Votes	%	±%
Liberal Democrats	Tessa Ward	816		
Liberal Democrats	Christopher Wise	725		
Conservative	Guy Rogers	376		
Conservative	Vernon Porter	354		
Labour	Cedric Edmonds-Brown	102		
Majority				
Turnout				

Sutton Courtenay and Appleford
Party	Candidate	Votes	%	±%
Conservative	Gervase Duffield	308		
Labour	Edward Crask	192		
Liberal Democrats	Patrick Wallace	134		
Majority				
Turnout				

Wantage, Charlton
Party	Candidate	Votes	%	±%
Conservative	Amanda Harland	800		
Liberal Democrats	James Moley	727		
Conservative	Edwin Goldsmith	670		
Conservative	Carol Tomlinson	657		
Liberal Democrats	Jean Kent	595		
Liberal Democrats	Peter Kent	593		
Labour	Francis Kelly	229		
Labour	Michael Langston	226		
Green	Kevin Harris	205		
Majority				
Turnout				

Wantage, Segsbury
Party	Candidate	Votes	%	±%
Liberal Democrats	Jennifer Hannaby	468		
Liberal Democrats	Joyce Hutchinson	395		
Conservative	John Humphries	261		
Conservative	Adam Dodwell	247		
Labour	Jean Nunn-Price	240		
Labour	Stephen Quinton	195		
Majority				
Turnout				
