= 2007 Vale of White Horse District Council election =

2007 UK local government election

Results of the 2007 Vale of White Horse District Council election

Elections to Vale of White Horse District Council were held on 3 May 2007. The whole council was up for election and the council stayed under Liberal Democrat control with an increased majority. Turnout was significantly higher in many wards than it was in 2003.

== Election results ==
Composition of the council following the 2007 election:

- Liberal Democrat 34
- Conservative 17

Vale of White Horse local election result 2007
Party	Seats	Gains	Losses	Net gain/loss	Seats %	Votes %	Votes	+/−
Liberal Democrats	34	7	2	+5	67.0	45.6	32,119	
Conservative	17	2	6	-4	33.0	45.5	32,089	
Labour	0	0	0	0	0.0	5.9	4,178	
Green	0	0	0	0	0.0	1.8	1,270	
UKIP	0	0	0	0	0.0	1.2	854	

== Ward results ==
Abingdon, Abbey and Barton (2)
Party	Candidate	Votes	%	±%
Liberal Democrats	Anthony De Vere	784		
Liberal Democrats	Julie Mayhew-Archer	771		
Conservative	Andrew Hoare	510		
Conservative	Jennifer Standen	505		
Labour	Rachel Eden	156		
Majority				
Turnout				

Abingdon, Caldecott (2)
Party	Candidate	Votes	%	±%
Liberal Democrats	Mary De Vere	485		
Liberal Democrats	Paul Burton	462		
Conservative	Paul Campbell	388		
Conservative	Elwyn McKeown	379		
Labour	David Banner	188		
Green	Hazel Hornblow	86		
Majority				
Turnout				

Abingdon, Dunmore (2)
Party	Candidate	Votes	%	±%
Liberal Democrats	Janet Morgan	991		
Liberal Democrats	Timothy Smith	964		
Conservative	Peter Jones	777		
Conservative	Sandy Lovatt	758		
Labour	Brian Jeffries	119		
Majority				
Turnout				

Abingdon, Fitzharris (2)
Party	Candidate	Votes	%	±%
Liberal Democrats	Richard Gibson	802		
Liberal Democrats	Jim Halliday	784		
Conservative	Monica Lovatt	551		
Conservative	Jackie Carpenter	543		
Green	Dorothy Shaw	155		
Labour	Bridget Wilkinson	90		
Majority				
Turnout				

Abingdon, Northcourt (2)
Party	Candidate	Votes	%	±%
Liberal Democrats	Angela Lawrence	781		
Liberal Democrats	Laurel Symons	744		
Conservative	Guy Rogers	560		
Conservative	Mohammed Yusuf	473		
Labour	Denise Watt	151		
Majority				
Turnout				

Abingdon, Ock Meadow (2)
Party	Candidate	Votes	%	±%
Liberal Democrats	Samantha Bowring	805		
Liberal Democrats	Beth Flemming	744		
Conservative	Charles Badcock	698		
Conservative	Marylin Badcock	677		
Majority				
Turnout				

Abingdon, Peachcroft (2)
Party	Candidate	Votes	%	±%
Liberal Democrats	Alison Rooke	904		
Liberal Democrats	Pat Lonergan	845		
Conservative	Patrick Clipperton	662		
Conservative	Maurice Shea	606		
Majority				
Turnout				

Appleton and Cumnor (3)
Party	Candidate	Votes	%	±%
Liberal Democrats	Dudley Hoddinott	1,142		
Liberal Democrats	Judy Roberts	1,139		
Liberal Democrats	John Woodford	1,020		
Conservative	Ian Gearing	790		
Conservative	David Calvert	672		
Conservative	Malcolm Walls	669		
UKIP	Pam Gee	385		
Green	Marie Spragg	300		
UKIP	Jacqueline Jones	263		
UKIP	Peter Jones	206		
Majority				
Turnout				

Blewbury and Upton (1)
Party	Candidate	Votes	%	±%
Liberal Democrats	Richard Farrell	463		
Conservative	Robert Manley	314		
Majority				
Turnout				

Craven (1)
Party	Candidate	Votes	%	±%
Conservative	Yvonne Constance	650		
Liberal Democrats	James Sibbald	115		
Labour	James Douglas	106		
Majority				
Turnout				

Drayton (1)
Party	Candidate	Votes	%	±%
Liberal Democrats	Richard Weber	503		
Conservative	David Price	178		
Green	Ruth Johnson	53		
Majority				
Turnout				

Faringdon and the Coxwells (3)
Party	Candidate	Votes	%	±%
Conservative	Matthew Barber	1,272		
Conservative	Alison Thomson	1,244		
Conservative	Roger Cox	1,154		
Labour	Alan Victor	462		
Labour	Stephen Leniec	459		
Liberal Democrats	Alan Bennett	313		
Liberal Democrats	Patrick O'Leary	262		
Majority				
Turnout				

Greendown (1)
Party	Candidate	Votes	%	±%
Liberal Democrats	Andrew Crawford	562		
Conservative	Valerie Clure	332		
Labour	Micheal Juer	57		
Majority				
Turnout				

Grove (3)
Party	Candidate	Votes	%	±%
Liberal Democrats	Zoe Patrick	1,127		
Conservative	James McGee	1,067		
Liberal Democrats	Sue Marchant	895		
Conservative	Kate Precious	859		
Conservative	Jeremy Renwick	819		
Liberal Democrats	Ian Weeden	794		
Labour	Richard Ackers	294		
Labour	Chris Davenport	196		
Labour	Zoe Parker	186		
Majority				
Turnout				

Hanneys (1)
Party	Candidate	Votes	%	±%
Conservative	Terence Cox	578		
Liberal Democrats	Robert Graham	133		
Labour	John Mathews	59		
Majority				
Turnout				

Harwell (2)
Party	Candidate	Votes	%	±%
Conservative	Margaret Turner	948	36.3	
Conservative	Reg Waite	872	33.4	
Green	Nicolas Freestone	226	8.7	
Liberal Democrats	Jean Kent	201	7.7	
Labour	Frank Treml	181	6.9	
Liberal Democrats	Peter Kent	181	6.9	
Majority				
Turnout				

Hendreds (2)
Party	Candidate	Votes	%	±%
Conservative	Micheal Murray	625		
Liberal Democrats	Terry Fraser	607		
Liberal Democrats	Mike Green	530		
Conservative	Harry Richardson	515		
Majority				
Turnout				

Kennington and South Hinksey (2)
Party	Candidate	Votes	%	±%
Liberal Democrats	Jerry Patterson	815		
Conservative	Gareth Jennings	780		
Conservative	Arash Fatemian	765		
Liberal Democrats	Bernard Auton	752		
Majority				
Turnout				

Kingston Bagpuize with Southmoor (1)
Party	Candidate	Votes	%	±%
Conservative	Melinda Tilley	461		
Labour	Ann Thompson	119		
Liberal Democrats	Lindy Farrell	90		
Majority				
Turnout				

Longworth (1)
Party	Candidate	Votes	%	±%
Conservative	Anthony Hayward	593		
Liberal Democrats	Edward Last	216		
Majority				
Turnout				

Marcham and Shippon (1)
Party	Candidate	Votes	%	±%
Liberal Democrats	Jane Hanna	550		
Conservative	Leslie Mitchell	386		
Majority				
Turnout				

North Hinksey and Wytham (2)
Party	Candidate	Votes	%	±%
Liberal Democrats	Jenny Shepard	879		
Liberal Democrats	David Quinlan	862		
Conservative	Eric Batts	538		
Conservative	Basil England	470		
Green	Robert Cowley	284		
Majority				
Turnout				

Radley (1)
Party	Candidate	Votes	%	±%
Liberal Democrats	Robin Johnston	534		
Conservative	Denis Standen	301		
Green	Christopher Henderson	76		
Majority				
Turnout				

Shrivenham (2)
Party	Candidate	Votes	%	±%
Conservative	Elaine Ware	914		
Conservative	Peter Saunders	873		
Liberal Democrats	Frank Mullin	489		
Liberal Democrats	Bjorn Watson	442		
Majority				
Turnout				

Stanford (1)
Party	Candidate	Votes	%	±%
Conservative	Robert Sharp	397		
Labour	Peter Gill	264		
Liberal Democrats	Brian Sadler	70		
Majority				
Turnout				

Sunningwell and Wootton (2)
Party	Candidate	Votes	%	±%
Liberal Democrats	Chris Wise	887		
Liberal Democrats	Val Shaw	846		
Conservative	Julian Wheatland	487		
Conservative	Stephen Pritchard	476		
Majority				
Turnout				

Sutton Courtenay and Appleford (1)
Party	Candidate	Votes	%	±%
Conservative	Gervase Duffield	418		
Liberal Democrats	Simon Thompson	172		
Green	David Sherwood	90		
Majority				
Turnout				

Wantage, Charlton (3)
Party	Candidate	Votes	%	±%
Liberal Democrats	Jim Moley	1,089		
Liberal Democrats	Julia Reynolds	1,018		
Conservative	Bill Melotti	961		
Conservative	Eddy Goldsmith	892		
Conservative	John Morgan	873		
Liberal Democrats	Lorraine Todd	831		
Labour	Steve Quinton	273		
Labour	Ed Mitchell	225		
Labour	Julie Davenport	220		
Majority				
Turnout				

Wantage, Segsbury (2)
Party	Candidate	Votes	%	±%
Liberal Democrats	Jennifer Hannaby	553		
Liberal Democrats	Joyce Hutchinson	474		
Conservative	John Amys	426		
Conservative	Ben Griffin	394		
Labour	Stuart Taylor	227		
Labour	Jean Nunn-Price	216		
Majority				
Turnout				
