= How to Look Good Naked =

British television programme

- Presented by: Gok Wan
- Country of origin: United Kingdom

Production
- Executive producers: Riaz Patel; Alex Fraser; Jo Rosenfelder; Jim Sayer; Chris Coelen; Greg Goldman; Carson Kressley
- Producers: Paula Archer; Aja Becher; Jerry Carita; Andrea Chung; Elizabeth Davies; Diane DeStefano; David Garfield; Atousa Hojatpanah; Valana Hunn; Camilla Rahaman; Richard D. Tucci
- Production company: Maverick Television

Original release
- Network: Channel 4, Really

How to Look Good Naked is a television programme, first aired on British Channel 4 in 2006, in which fashion stylist Gok Wan encourages women and men who are insecure with their bodies to strip nude for the camera. Participants are never encouraged to undergo cosmetic surgery or lose weight. The U.S. format premiered on Lifetime Television in 2008 with Carson Kressley hosting, and was the #1 unscripted show on the network at the time.

On 27 June 2019, it was announced that the show would be revived by Really with Gok Wan returning as host. This would be the channel's first commission since its acquisition by Discovery.

== Format ==
The format of the show is based on activities designed to build a woman's self-esteem and self-confidence. These include photographing the woman naked and then displaying a very large picture of the woman's body in a public place, such as projected onto the side of a building or on the side of a van, and asking passers-by what they think of them. Viewers typically respond very positively, which builds the woman's self-esteem. Wan burns the woman's current underwear and then replaces it with more flattering underwear, including "tummy tuck pants". At the end of each episode, Wan asks the woman to walk down the modeling catwalk showing her new nude look to family and friends.

In more recent episodes, Wan has used a variety of very personal tactics designed to encourage women to love their bodies and feel sexy. He has had women pose naked in London shop windows, stopped women on the street and asked if they have Lady Lines, published the image of a semi-naked woman on the front of a fake newspaper titled Naked News, and then handed the newspaper out on a busy London street. At the end of each catwalk show, the woman is encouraged to strip naked on stage to show how far they had come in terms of body confidence.

== Catchphrases ==
Wan's favourite and most famous catchphrases include "bangers", which is slang for breasts, and "gorgeous", often calling the women participating in the show "girlfriend". Many of his other catchphrases are puns on his name, such as "Gok shock" and "fairy Gok mother". In his most recent series, Wan has introduced a new feature aimed at giving style and beauty advice to men, which he calls "Wan for the boys".

== Series guide ==
- Series 1: Eight 30 minute episodes – first shown from 27 June 2006
- Series 2: Eight 30 minute episodes – first shown from 1 May 2007
- Series 3: Eight 30 minute episodes – first shown from 14 November 2007
- Series 4: Seven 30 minute episodes + six 60 minute revisits – first shown from 8 April 2008

American Series:

- Series 1 : Eight 30 minute episodes
- Series 2 : Eight 60 minute episodes

== Versions in other countries ==
The U.S. version of How to Look Good Naked airs on Lifetime, and is hosted by Carson Kressley. The show was promoted on The Oprah Winfrey Show, in addition to receiving rave reviews from the New York Times and the L.A. Times. Its premiere was the biggest in the network's 24-year history. The US version has aired on Network Ten in Australia and E4 in the United Kingdom.

In Belgium, there is a show called Look Good or Nicely Naked.

There is also a Swedish version called Snygg Naken, an Italian version called Nude e Belle, an Israeli version called בעירום מלא (Be'erom Mal'e), a French version, Belle toute nue, which began on the M6 channel on 9 December 2008, and Polish version called Jak dobrze wyglądać nago, which will begin on TVN Style channel in March 2009.

In late 2009, the Canadian version of How to Look Good Naked premiered and currently runs on the W Network, on which the UK version once aired. It is hosted by Zain Meghji.

Since 2010, a Czech version called Nahá jsi krásná (Naked you're beautiful) has been hosted by Libor Šula.
