= Sonny Leong, Baron Leong =

British businessman and politician (born 1953)

The Right Honourable The Lord Leong CBE
- 梁辛尼
- Official portrait, 2026

Parliamentary Under-Secretary of State for Small Business and Enterprise (Note: Parliamentary Under-Secretary of State for Business and Trade from 12 June 2026 until 23 July 2026)
- Incumbent
- Assumed office 12 June 2026
- Prime Minister: Keir Starmer; Andy Burnham
- Preceded by: Blair McDougall

Lord-in-Waiting Government Whip
- In office 11 July 2024 – 12 June 2026
- Prime Minister: Keir Starmer
- Succeeded by: Baroness Curran

Member of the House of Lords
- Lord Temporal
- Life peerage 31 October 2022

Personal details
- Born: Sonny Leong; September 1953 (age 73)
- Party: Labour

Sonny Leong, Baron Leong, CBE (born September 1953), is a British Labour Party politician.

== Career ==
Leong co-founded Cavendish Publishing in 1990. The company made £250,000 in its first year.

In 2001, he was appointed managing director of Cavendish Publishing, with a 30-percent stake in the company. By 2003, it was the largest independent law publisher in the United Kingdom.

In 2006, Leong sold Cavendish Publishing to Taylor & Francis. He left Taylor & Francis in 2007 to join One Charter, a private jet business, as a non-executive director.

Leong stood unsuccessfully for Labour in the 2015 Vale of White Horse District Council election, in the Blewbury & Harwell ward, finishing fourth of seven candidates with 12.73% of the vote.

Formerly the Chair of Chinese for Labour, in October 2022, it was announced that he would receive a life peerage in the 2022 Special Honours. On 31 October 2022, he was created Baron Leong, of Chilton in the County of Oxfordshire and of Camden Town in the London Borough of Camden. He was made a Government Whip in the Lord's in July 2024.

He is a member of the Fabian Society.

== Personal life ==
Leong and his wife, Gita, have a daughter, Sonya. He was appointed a Commander of the Order of the British Empire (CBE) in the 2014 Birthday Honours for political service.

== Notes ==
Orders of precedence in the United Kingdom
Preceded by The Lord Soames of Fletching	Gentlemen; Baron Leong	Followed by The Lord Roberts of Belgravia
