= 2023 Vale of White Horse District Council election =

2023 English local election

- 4 May 2023

All 38 seats to Vale of White Horse District Council 20 seats needed for a majority
- Turnout: 36.6%

	First party	Second party
Leader	Bethia Thomas	Katharine Foxhall
Party	Liberal Democrats	Green
Last election	31 seats, 55.4%	1 seat, 5.1%
Seats before	30	1
Seats won	34	4
Seat change	▲3	▲3
Popular vote	34,321	6,823
Percentage	54.6%	10.9%
Swing	▼0.8%	▲5.8%
	Third party	Fourth party
Leader	Nathan Boyd
Party	Conservative	Independent
Last election	6 seats, 31.2%	0 seats, 0.3%
Seats before	6	1
Seats won	0	0
Seat change	▼6	Steady
Popular vote	18,499	100
Percentage	29.4%	0.2%
Swing	▼1.8%	▼0.2%
- Winner of each seat at the 2023 Vale of White Horse District Council election
Leader before election
Bethia Thomas
Liberal Democrats
Leader after election
Bethia Thomas
Liberal Democrats

The 2023 Vale of White Horse District Council election took place on 4 May 2023 to elect members of Vale of White Horse District Council in Oxfordshire, England. This was on the same day as other local elections across England. The election saw the Liberal Democrats increase their majority on the council, as well as the defeat of all remaining Conservatives.

== Summary ==
=== Election result ===
All six Conservative councillors lost their seats, while the Liberal Democrats and the Green Party gained an additional three seats each. This was the first time since the creation of the council in 1974 that no Conservative councillors were elected.

2023 Vale of White Horse District Council election
Party	Candidates	Seats	Gains	Losses	Net gain/loss	Seats %	Votes %	Votes	+/−
Liberal Democrats	34	34	3	0	▲3	89.5	54.6	34,321	–0.8
Green	15	4	3	0	▲3	10.5	10.9	6,823	+5.8
Conservative	38	0	0	6	▼6	0	29.4	18,499	–1.8
Labour	13	0	0	0	Steady	0	4.8	3,005	–2.0
Reform	1	0	0	0	Steady	0	0.2	101	N/A
Independent	1	0	0	0	Steady	0	0.2	100	–0.1

== Ward results ==
The Statement of Persons Nominated, which details the candidates standing in each ward, was released by Vale of White Horse District Council on 5 April 2023.

* = sitting councillor in this ward prior to election

=== Abingdon Abbey Northcourt ===
Abingdon Abbey Northcourt (2 seats)
Party	Candidate	Votes	%	±%
Liberal Democrats	Elizabeth Pighills*	1,109	62.9	−10.0
Green	Cheryl Briggs*	948	53.8	−10.5
Conservative	Vicky Jenkins	389	22.1	−1.0
Labour	Stephen Webb	299	17.0	N/A
Conservative	Vijay Srao	273	15.5	−7.1
Labour	Nathan Websdale	215	12.2	N/A
Majority		559	31.7	
Turnout		1,777	37.30	
Rejected ballots		15	0.8	
Registered electors		4,764		
Liberal Democrats hold		Swing		
Green hold		Swing		

=== Abingdon Caldecott ===
Abingdon Caldecott (2 seats)
Party	Candidate	Votes	%	±%
Liberal Democrats	Neil Fawcett*	805	49.8	−6.2
Liberal Democrats	Andrew Skinner	672	41.6	−14.4
Conservative	Alice Badcock	522	32.3	+0.5
Conservative	Alexandra Green	503	31.1	+1.1
Green	Aidan Reilly	301	18.6	N/A
Labour	Sayantani Mitra-Jones	280	17.3	+2.9
Majority		150	9.3	
Turnout		1,631	29.52	
Rejected ballots		15	0.9	
Registered electors		5,526		
Liberal Democrats hold		Swing		
Liberal Democrats hold		Swing		

=== Abingdon Dunmore ===
Abingdon Dunmore (2 seats)
Party	Candidate	Votes	%	±%
Liberal Democrats	Andy Foulsham*	1,216	64.7	+2.9
Liberal Democrats	Oliver Forder	1,131	60.2	−4.8
Conservative	Andrew Packard	506	26.9	−1.7
Conservative	Christopher McCarthy	451	24.0	−3.9
Labour	Paul Burton	281	15.0	+6.7
Majority		625	33.3	
Turnout		1,900	40.29	
Rejected ballots		21	1.1	
Registered electors		4,716		
Liberal Democrats hold		Swing		
Liberal Democrats hold		Swing		

=== Abingdon Fitzharris ===
Abingdon Fitzharris (2 seats)
Party	Candidate	Votes	%	±%
Liberal Democrats	Eric de la Harpe*	894	48.6	−10.2
Liberal Democrats	Robert Maddison*	838	45.5	−12.5
Conservative	Chris Palmer	520	28.2	−0.3
Conservative	David Pope	493	26.8	−5.3
Green	Steven Rogers	313	17.0	N/A
Labour	Moira Logie	276	15.0	+7.1
Labour	Julian Pierce	168	9.1	N/A
Majority		318	17.3	
Turnout		1,864	38.94	
Rejected ballots		23	1.2	
Registered electors		4,787		
Liberal Democrats hold		Swing		
Liberal Democrats hold		Swing		

=== Abingdon Peachcroft ===
Abingdon Peachcroft (2 seats)
Party	Candidate	Votes	%	±%
Liberal Democrats	Mike Pighills*	1,140	59.1	−4.6
Liberal Democrats	Max Thompson*	1,122	58.2	−3.9
Conservative	Cavan Pirouet	561	29.1	−2.1
Conservative	Warren Brooker	551	28.6	+0.1
Labour	Edward Shelton	276	14.3	N/A
Majority		561	29.1	
Turnout		1,945	37.59	
Rejected ballots		16	0.8	
Registered electors		5,174		
Liberal Democrats hold		Swing		
Liberal Democrats hold		Swing		

=== Blewbury & Harwell ===
Blewbury & Harwell (2 seats)
Party	Candidate	Votes	%	±%
Liberal Democrats	Hayleigh Gascoigne*	1,813	69.3	+8.3
Liberal Democrats	Debra Dewhurst	1,745	66.7	+7.7
Conservative	Cath Convery	743	28.4	±0.0
Conservative	Joe Murphy	612	23.4	−4.3
Reform	Peter Shields	101	3.9	N/A
Majority		1,002	38.3	
Turnout		2,628	39.21	
Rejected ballots		13	0.5	
Registered electors		6,702		
Liberal Democrats hold		Swing		
Liberal Democrats hold		Swing		

=== Botley & Sunningwell ===
Botley & Sunningwell (2 seats)
Party	Candidate	Votes	%	±%
Liberal Democrats	Emily Smith*	1,184	59.9	−3.1
Liberal Democrats	Debby Hallett*	1,155	58.4	−4.3
Conservative	Alexander Horsfall-Turner	327	16.5	+0.5
Labour	Nekisa Gholami-Babaahmady	323	16.3	+3.5
Conservative	Elina Horsfall-Turner	316	16.0	+0.9
Labour	Jamie Spooner	284	14.4	+3.9
Green	Katherine Phillips	27	1.4	−12.2
Majority		828	41.9	
Turnout		1,991	38.91	
Rejected ballots		14	0.7	
Registered electors		5,117		
Liberal Democrats hold		Swing		
Liberal Democrats hold		Swing		

=== Cumnor ===
Cumnor (2 seats)
Party	Candidate	Votes	%	±%
Liberal Democrats	Judy Roberts*	1,333	69.0	+6.7
Liberal Democrats	Antony Houghton	1,078	55.8	−7.7
Conservative	Craig Robinson	486	25.2	−2.7
Conservative	Mohinder Kainth	437	22.6	−3.0
Labour	Erica Davis	291	15.1	+5.0
Majority		592	30.7	
Turnout		1,935	38.17	
Rejected ballots		4	0.2	
Registered electors		5,069		
Liberal Democrats hold		Swing		
Liberal Democrats hold		Swing		

=== Drayton ===
Drayton
Party	Candidate	Votes	%	±%
Liberal Democrats	Andy Cooke*	690	72.7	−1.2
Conservative	Christopher Campbell	259	27.3	+1.2
Majority		431	45.4	
Turnout		955	33.77	
Rejected ballots		6	0.6	
Registered electors		2,828		
Liberal Democrats hold		Swing		

=== Faringdon ===
Faringdon (2 seats)
Party	Candidate	Votes	%	±%
Liberal Democrats	Bethia Thomas*	1,531	68.0	+12.0
Liberal Democrats	Lucy Edwards	1,390	61.7	+15.5
Conservative	James Famakin	583	25.9	+0.7
Conservative	Robin Morrisen	481	21.3	−1.9
Green	Adam Swallow	319	14.2	+2.9
Majority		807	35.8	
Turnout		2,262	34.49	
Rejected ballots		9	0.4	
Registered electors		6,559		
Liberal Democrats hold		Swing		
Liberal Democrats hold		Swing		

=== Grove North ===
Grove North (2 seats)
Party	Candidate	Votes	%	±%
Liberal Democrats	Ron Batstone*	986	69.6	+20.1
Liberal Democrats	Kiera Bentley	906	63.9	+17.1
Conservative	Ben Mabbett*	471	33.2	+0.6
Conservative	Craig Brown	395	27.9	+2.1
Majority		435	30.7	
Turnout		1,421	27.57	
Rejected ballots		4	0.3	
Registered electors		5,155		
Liberal Democrats hold		Swing		
Liberal Democrats hold		Swing		

=== Hendreds ===
Hendreds
Party	Candidate	Votes	%	±%
Green	Sarah James	735	67.7	N/A
Conservative	Janet Shelley*	350	32.3	−24.7
Majority		385	35.1	
Turnout		1,101	41.05	
Rejected ballots		5	0.5	
Registered electors		2,682		
Green gain from Conservative		Swing		

=== Kennington & Radley ===
Kennington & Radley (2 seats)
Party	Candidate	Votes	%	±%
Liberal Democrats	Diana Lugova*	1,056	56.0	−7.6
Liberal Democrats	James Cox	899	47.7	−24.2
Conservative	Gareth Jennings	515	27.3	−4.5
Conservative	David Brown	462	24.5	+2.7
Green	Charles Couper	282	15.0	N/A
Green	Christopher Henderson	247	13.1	N/A
Labour	Ruth Mayne	170	9.0	N/A
Majority		384	20.4	
Turnout		1,902	36.30	
Rejected ballots		16	0.8	
Registered electors		5,240		
Liberal Democrats hold		Swing		
Liberal Democrats hold		Swing		

=== Kingston Bagpuize ===
Kingston Bagpuize
Party	Candidate	Votes	%	±%
Liberal Democrats	Jill Rayner	880	59.6	N/A
Conservative	Dianna Swale	596	40.4	+40.4
Majority		284	19.2	
Turnout		1,492	38.77	
Rejected ballots		15	1.0	
Registered electors		3,848		
Liberal Democrats gain from Conservative		Swing		

=== Marcham ===
Marcham
Party	Candidate	Votes	%	±%
Liberal Democrats	Robert Clegg	497	58.2	−12.5
Conservative	James Plumb	357	41.8	+12.5
Majority		140	16.4	
Turnout		866	34.15	
Rejected ballots		12	1.4	
Registered electors		2,536		
Liberal Democrats hold		Swing		

=== Ridgeway ===
Ridgeway
Party	Candidate	Votes	%	±%
Liberal Democrats	Paul Barrow*	671	58.0	+7.8
Conservative	Amos Lundie	485	42.0	−7.8
Majority		186	16.1	
Turnout		1,161	44.01	
Rejected ballots		5	0.4	
Registered electors		2,638		
Liberal Democrats hold		Swing		

=== Stanford ===
Stanford
Party	Candidate	Votes	%	±%
Liberal Democrats	Sue Caul	546	44.2	+24.4
Conservative	Nathan Boyd*	536	43.4	−4.6
Green	James Brooks	153	12.4	−5.7
Majority		10	0.8	
Turnout		1,243	41.00	
Rejected ballots		8	0.6	
Registered electors		3,032		
Liberal Democrats gain from Conservative		Swing		

=== Steventon & the Hanneys ===
Steventon & the Hanneys
Party	Candidate	Votes	%	±%
Liberal Democrats	Sally Povolotsky*	876	64.4	+23.4
Conservative	Louise Brown	485	35.6	−12.6
Majority		391	28.6	
Turnout		1,369	41.67	
Rejected ballots		3	0.2	
Registered electors		3,285		
Liberal Democrats gain from Conservative		Swing		

=== Sutton Courtenay ===
Sutton Courtenay
Party	Candidate	Votes	%	±%
Liberal Democrats	Richard Webber*	488	58.5	−17.4
Conservative	Patrick Atkinson	233	27.9	+3.8
Green	Michel Grandjean	113	13.5	N/A
Majority		255	30.5	
Turnout		837	32.66	
Rejected ballots		2	0.2	
Registered electors		2,563		
Liberal Democrats hold		Swing		

=== Thames ===
Thames
Party	Candidate	Votes	%	±%
Liberal Democrats	Mark Coleman	606	49.8	−3.2
Conservative	Richard Swale	427	35.1	−11.9
Independent	Jerry Avery*	100	8.2	−44.8
Labour	Daniel Crouch	83	6.8	N/A
Majority		179	14.7	
Turnout		1,217	44.13	
Rejected ballots		1	0.1	
Registered electors		2,758		
Liberal Democrats hold		Swing		

=== Wantage & Grove Brook ===
Wantage & Grove Brook (2 seats)
Party	Candidate	Votes	%	±%
Liberal Democrats	Jenny Hannaby*	1,160	65.1	+2.9
Liberal Democrats	Amos Duveen*	976	54.7	+6.6
Conservative	Clare Boyd	446	25.0	−5.5
Conservative	Gabriella Turnbull	418	23.4	−1.8
Green	Thomas Gaston	360	20.2	N/A
Majority		530	29.7	
Turnout		1,794	31.13	
Rejected ballots		11	0.6	
Registered electors		5,763		
Liberal Democrats hold		Swing		
Liberal Democrats hold		Swing		

=== Wantage Charlton ===
Wantage Charlton (2 seats)
Party	Candidate	Votes	%	±%
Liberal Democrats	Andy Crawford*	1,291	67.1	+6.5
Liberal Democrats	Patrick O'Leary*	1,205	62.6	+2.3
Conservative	Charlotte Dickson	436	22.6	−5.5
Green	Darshana Patel	388	20.2	N/A
Conservative	Charles Dickson	380	19.7	−6.4
Majority		769	39.9	
Turnout		1,943	32.46	
Rejected ballots		18	0.9	
Registered electors		5,986		
Liberal Democrats hold		Swing		
Liberal Democrats hold		Swing		

=== Watchfield & Shrivenham ===
Watchfield & Shrivenham (2 seats)
Party	Candidate	Votes	%	±%
Green	Katherine Foxhall	1,355	55.6	N/A
Green	Viral Patel	1,170	48.0	N/A
Conservative	Simon Howell*	1,091	44.7	−16.1
Conservative	Elaine Ware*	1,055	43.3	−19.9
Majority		79	3.2	
Turnout		2,446	39.76	
Rejected ballots		8	0.3	
Registered electors		6,152		
Green gain from Conservative		Swing		
Green gain from Conservative		Swing		

=== Wootton ===
Wootton
Party	Candidate	Votes	%	±%
Liberal Democrats	Val Shaw*	432	45.4	−16.8
Conservative	George Robinson	348	36.6	−1.2
Green	Anna Thomas	112	11.8	N/A
Labour	Chris Hall	59	6.2	N/A
Majority		84	8.8	
Turnout		957	35.05	
Rejected ballots		6	0.6	
Registered electors		2,730		
Liberal Democrats hold		Swing		

== Changes 2023–2027 ==
- December 2023: Sally Povolotsky, elected as a Liberal Democrat for Steventon & the Hanneys, left the party to sit as an independent.
- May 2024: Debra Dewhurst, elected as a Liberal Democrat for Blewbury & Harwell, left the party to sit as an independent. In July 2024 she and Povolotsky formed the Independent Voice for Vale group.
- May 2026: Mike Pighills, elected as a Liberal Democrat for Abingdon Peachcroft, left the party to sit as an independent after disagreeing with the allocation of councillors to committees.

=== By-elections ===
==== Sutton Courtenay ====
The by-election followed the resignation of Liberal Democrat councillor Richard Webber, who at the same time stood down from Oxfordshire County Council for health reasons.

Sutton Courtenay by-election, 20 June 2024
Party	Candidate	Votes	%	±%
Liberal Democrats	Peter Stevens	226	33.6	−24.9
Green	Aidan Reilly	214	31.8	+18.3
Conservative	Christopher Campbell	182	27.1	−0.8
Labour	Stephen Webb	50	7.4	N/A
Majority		12	1.8	
Turnout		672	25	–7.7
Rejected ballots		0	0.0	
Registered electors		2,688		
Liberal Democrats hold		Swing	▼21.6	

==== Botley & Sunningwell ====
Liberal Democrat councillor Debby Hallett, a member of the council since 2011, resigned, prompting this by-election.

Botley & Sunningwell by-election, 10 July 2025
Party	Candidate	Votes	%	±%
Liberal Democrats	Ben Potter	732	71.5	+7.9
Conservative	Charlotte Adlung	162	15.8	–1.8
Green	Thomas Gaston	130	12.7	+11.2
Majority		570	55.7	N/A
Turnout		1,035	20.1	–18.8
Rejected ballots		10	1.0	
Registered electors		5,148		
Liberal Democrats hold		Swing	▲4.9	

==== Ridgeway ====
Liberal Democrat councillor Paul Barrow resigned for health reasons, following a cancer diagnosis in 2019, triggering this by-election.

Ridgeway by-election, 13 November 2025
Party	Candidate	Votes	%	±%
Liberal Democrats	Hannah Griffin	442	43.1	–14.9
Conservative	Charlotte Dickson	250	24.4	–17.6
Reform	Henry de Kretser	204	19.9	N/A
Green	Kiera Barnett	122	11.9	N/A
Labour	Rob Blundell	8	0.8	N/A
Majority		192	18.7	+2.6
Turnout		1,026	38	–6.0
Rejected ballots		0	0.0	
Registered electors		2,686		
Liberal Democrats hold		Swing	▲1.4	

==== Abingdon Abbey Northcourt ====
Green Party councillor Cheryl Briggs resigned from the council, causing this by-election.

Abingdon Abbey Northcourt by-election, 12 March 2026
Party	Candidate	Votes	%	±%
Liberal Democrats	Caleb Pell	647	43.7	▲3.3
Green	Aidan Reilly	480	32.5	▼2.0
Reform	Luis Prado Luque	204	13.8	N/A
Conservative	Christopher Palmer	101	6.8	▼7.6
Labour	Stephen Webb	47	3.2	▼7.7
Majority		167	11.3	
Turnout		1,482	31.6	▼5.7
Rejected ballots		2	0.1	
Registered electors		4,693		
Liberal Democrats gain from Green		Swing	▲2.7	

==== Stanford ====
The resignation of Liberal Democrat councillor Sue Caul led to this by-election.

Stanford by-election, 26 March 2026
Party	Candidate	Votes	%	±%
Conservative	Lee Evans	666	45.9	+2.5
Liberal Democrats	Adrian Bettridge	395	27.2	−17.0
Reform	Sarah von Simson	261	18.0	N/A
Green	Jacob Yung	115	7.9	−4.5
Labour	Robert Blundell	13	0.9	N/A
Majority		271	18.7	
Turnout		1,452	43.4	+2.4
Rejected ballots		2	0.1	
Registered electors		3,345		
Conservative gain from Liberal Democrats		Swing	9.8	
