= 2011 Vale of White Horse District Council election =

United Kingdom election

Results of the 2011 Vale of White Horse District Council election

Elections to the Vale of White Horse District Council were held on 5 May 2011. The entire council was up for election and resulted in the Liberal Democrats losing control of the council to the Conservatives, who regained control for the first time since 1995.

== Election results ==
Composition of the council following the 2011 election was:

- Conservative 31
- Liberal Democrat 19
- Labour 1

Vale of White Horse local election result 2011
Party	Seats	Gains	Losses	Net gain/loss	Seats %	Votes %	Votes	+/−
Conservative	31			+14	60.8	48.8	38,426	
Liberal Democrats	19			-15	37.2	36.3	28,602	
Labour	1	1	0	+1	2.0	11.6	9,133	
UKIP	0	0	0	0	0.0	1.6	1,237	
Green	0	0	0	0	0.0	1.0	778	
Independent	0	0	0	0	0.0	0.7	526	
