= Vale of White Horse District Council =

District council in Oxfordshire, Engand, UK

Type
- Type: Non-metropolitan district council

History
- Founded: 1 April 1974

Leadership
- Chair: Oliver Forder, Liberal Democrat since 14 May 2025
- Leader: Bethia Thomas, Liberal Democrat since 7 December 2022
- Chief Executive: Adrianna Partridge (Note: Serves as joint chief executive for both South Oxfordshire and Vale of White Horse District Councils) since 1 January 2026

Structure
- Seats: 38 councillors
- Political groups: Administration (31) Liberal Democrats (31) Other parties (7) Green (3) Conservative (1) Independent (3)
- Length of term: 4 years

Elections
- Voting system: First-past-the-post, Whole council elected every 4 years
- Last election: 4 May 2023
- Next election: 6 May 2027

Meeting place
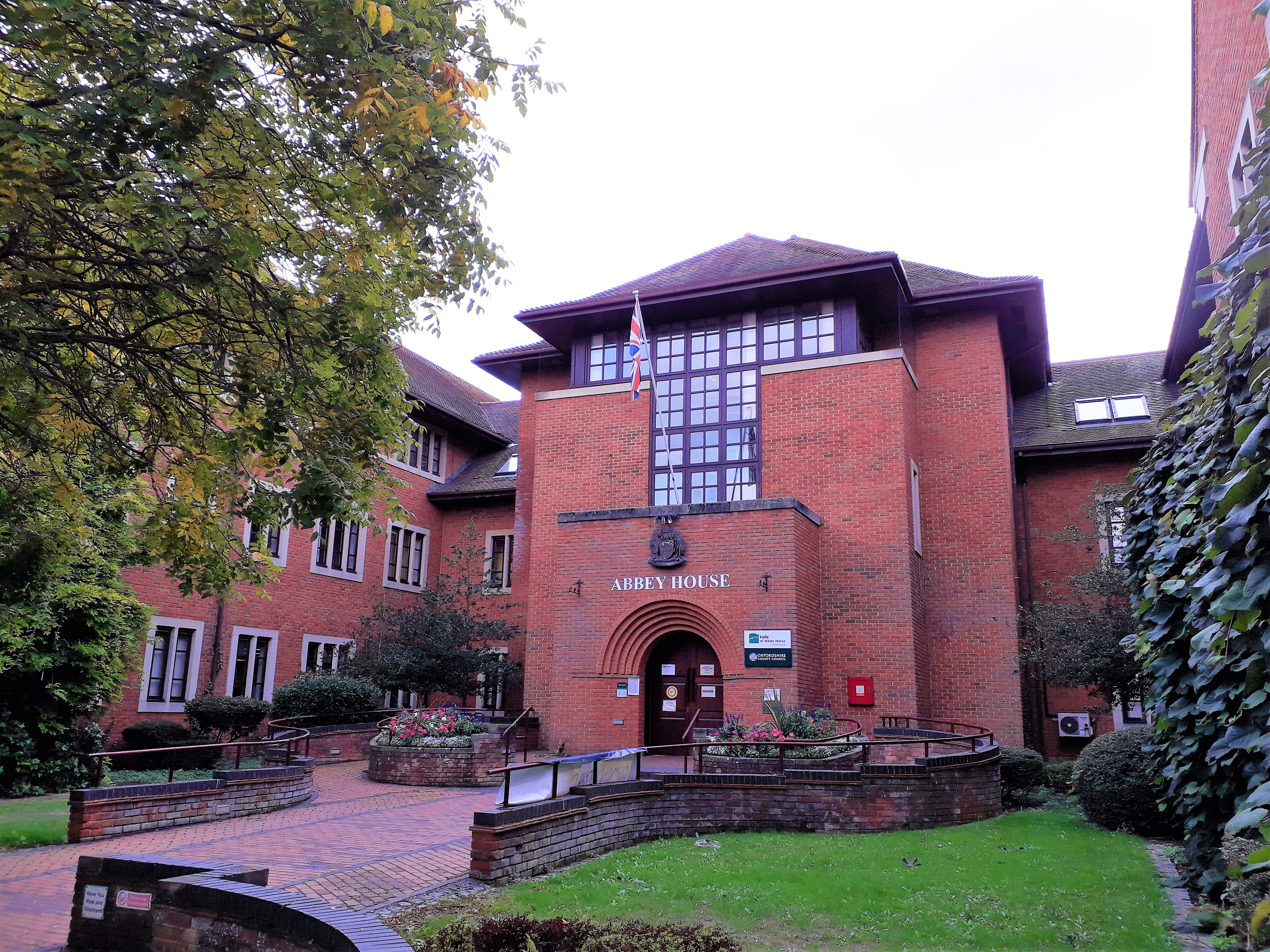
- Abbey House, Abbey Close, Abingdon, OX14 3JE

Website
- whitehorsedc.gov.uk

Vale of White Horse District Council is the local authority for the Vale of White Horse, a non-metropolitan district in the south-west of Oxfordshire, England.

== History ==
The non-metropolitan district of Vale of White Horse and its council were created on 1 April 1974 under the Local Government Act 1972. The new district covered the whole of four former districts and part of a fifth, all of which were abolished at the same time:

- Abingdon Municipal Borough
- Abingdon Rural District
- Faringdon Rural District
- Wantage Rural District (parishes lying generally north of the Ridgeway only; rest went to Newbury District)
- Wantage Urban District

The new district was named Vale of White Horse, an old name used for the area around the Uffington White Horse. The whole area had been in Berkshire prior to 1974, but was transferred to Oxfordshire as part of the reforms.

== Governance ==
The council provides district-level services. County-level services are provided by Oxfordshire County Council. The whole district is also covered by civil parishes, which form a third tier of local government.

Since 2008, the council has shared staff with neighbouring South Oxfordshire District Council.

=== Political control ===
The council has been under Liberal Democrat majority control since 2019.

The first election to the district council was held in 1973, initially operating as a shadow authority alongside the outgoing authorities until it came into its powers on 1 April 1974. Political control of the council since 1974 has been as follows:

Party in control	Years
Conservative	1974–1995
Liberal Democrats	1995–2011
Conservative	2011–2019
Liberal Democrats	2019–present

=== Leadership ===
The leaders of the council since 2004 have been:

Councillor	Party	From	To
Jerry Patterson	Liberal Democrats	2004	21 May 2008
Tony de Vere	Liberal Democrats	21 May 2008	May 2011
Matthew Barber	Conservative	18 May 2011	May 2018
Roger Cox	Conservative	16 May 2018	May 2019
Emily Smith	Liberal Democrats	15 May 2019	7 Dec 2022
Bethia Thomas	Liberal Democrats	7 Dec 2022	

=== Composition ===
Following the 2023 election and subsequent by-elections and changes of allegiance up to May 2026, the composition of the council was:

Party	Councillors
Liberal Democrats	31
Green	3
Conservative	1
Independent	3
Total	38

Two independents sit together as the 'Independent Voice for Vale' group.

== Elections ==
Since the last full review of boundaries in 2015, the council has comprised 38 councillors representing 24 wards, with each ward electing one or two councillors. Elections are held every four years.

== Premises ==
The council is based at Abbey House in Abingdon. The council was initially based in a number of offices inherited from its predecessor authorities across the district. In the early 1990s the council built itself a new headquarters in Abingdon called Abbey House (or "New Abbey House" to distinguish it from the neighbouring building formerly also called Abbey House, which was renamed "Old Abbey House").

In 2014 the council largely vacated Abbey House, retaining only a small presence there, with most of Abbey House since 2014 being occupied instead by Oxfordshire County Council. Vale of White Horse moved most of its staff to share the offices of its neighbour South Oxfordshire in Crowmarsh Gifford, but in 2015 that building was destroyed in a fire following an arson attack. From 2015 until 2022, Vale of White Horse and South Oxfordshire shared temporary office accommodation at Milton Park near Didcot. The two councils returned to Abbey House in 2022 as a temporary measure, with the intention being to build a new shared headquarters in Didcot.

== See also ==
- List of electoral wards in Oxfordshire
