= Endorsements in the 2019 Conservative Party leadership election =

This is a list of endorsements for declared candidates for the 2019 leadership election for the Conservative Party of the United Kingdom.

== Members of Parliament ==
In total, 188 out of 313 Conservative MPs openly backed a bid by one of the candidates in the race.

=== James Cleverly ===
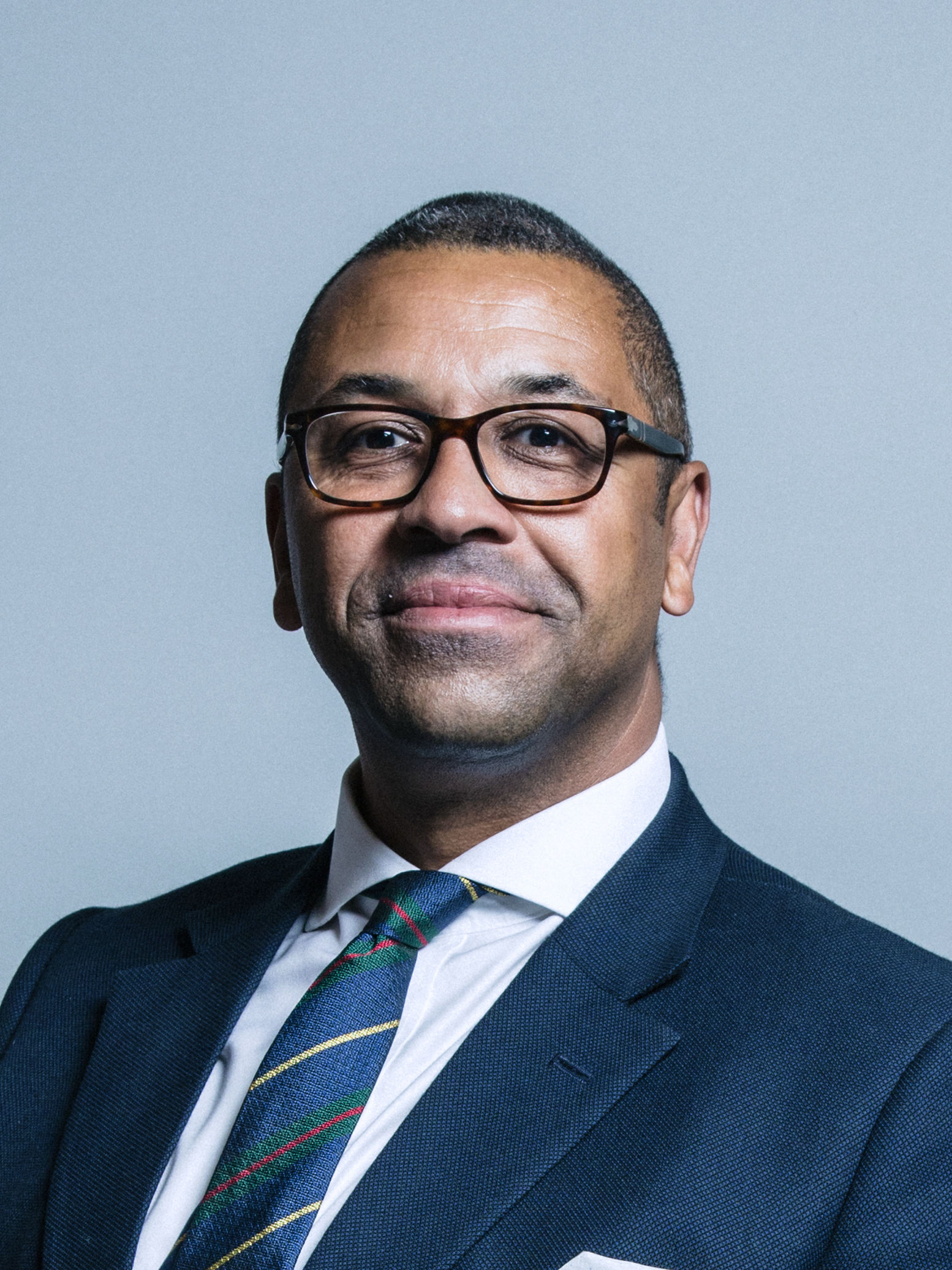
James Cleverly (subsequently endorsed Johnson)

Prior to his withdrawal on 4 June, James Cleverly had 3 backers among the Members of Parliament for the Conservative Party.

- Colin Clark, MP for Gordon since 2017 (subsequently endorsed Johnson)
- Julian Knight, MP for Solihull since 2015
- Stephen Metcalfe, MP for South Basildon and East Thurrock since 2010 (subsequently endorsed Raab, then Gove)

=== Michael Gove ===
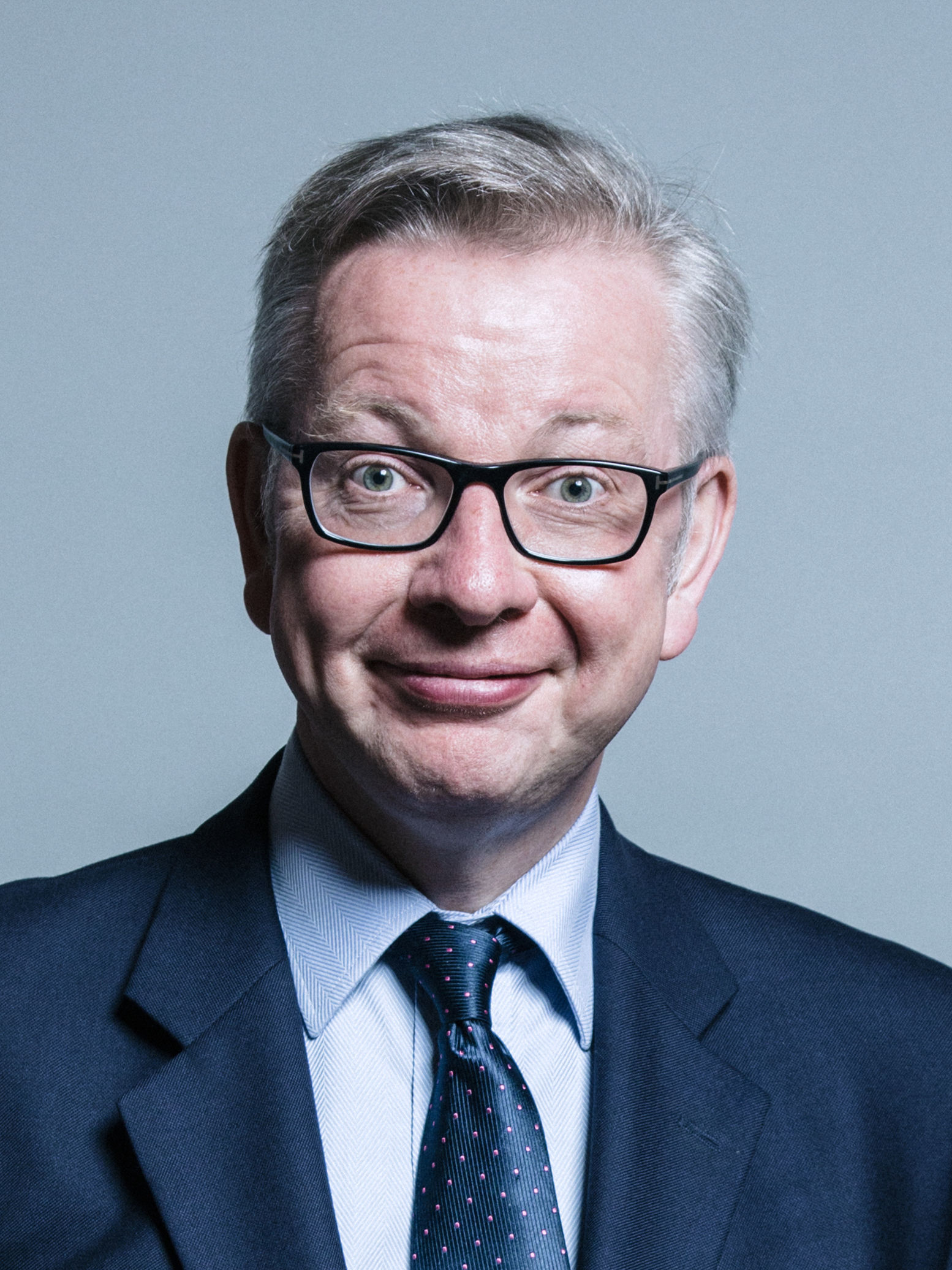
Michael Gove

Prior to his elimination on 20 June, Michael Gove had 36 backers among the Members of Parliament for the Conservative Party, including himself.

- Peter Aldous, MP for Waveney since 2010
- Kemi Badenoch, MP for Saffron Walden since 2017
- Richard Bacon, MP for South Norfolk since 2001
- Karen Bradley, Secretary of State for Northern Ireland since 2018 and MP for Staffordshire Moorlands since 2010
- Jack Brereton, MP for Stoke-on-Trent South since 2017
- Alberto Costa, MP for South Leicestershire since 2015
- David Duguid, MP for Banff and Buchan since 2017
- George Eustice, MP for Camborne and Redruth since 2010
- Michael Fabricant, MP for Lichfield since 1992
- Nick Gibb, MP for Bognor Regis and Littlehampton since 1997
- Luke Graham, MP for Ochil and South Perthshire since 2017
- Bill Grant, MP for Ayr, Carrick and Cumnock since 2017
- Kirstene Hair, MP for Angus since 2017
- John Hayes, MP for South Holland and The Deepings since 1997
- Trudy Harrison, MP for Copeland since 2017
- Damian Hinds, Secretary of State for Education since 2018 and MP for East Hampshire since 2010
- Kevin Hollinrake, MP for Thirsk and Malton since 2015
- Stephen Kerr, MP for Stirling since 2017
- Edward Leigh, MP for Gainsborough since 1983
- Oliver Letwin, Chancellor of the Duchy of Lancaster (2014–2016) and MP for West Dorset since 1997
- Rachel Maclean, MP for Redditch since 2017
- Mark Menzies, MP for Fylde since 2010
- Stephen Metcalfe, MP for South Basildon and East Thurrock since 2010
- Anne Milton, MP for Guildford since 2005
- Nicky Morgan, Secretary of State for Education (2014–2016) and MP for Loughborough since 2010
- David Mundell, Secretary of State for Scotland since 2015 and MP for Dumfriesshire, Clydesdale and Tweeddale since 2005
- Bob Neill, MP for Bromley and Chislehurst since 2006
- Guy Opperman, MP for Hexham since 2010
- Neil Parish, MP for Tiverton and Honiton since 2010
- Claire Perry, Minister of State for Energy & Clean Growth since 2017 and MP for Devizes since 2010
- John Stevenson, MP for Carlisle since 2010
- Mel Stride, Leader of the House of Commons since 2019 and MP for Central Devon since 2010
- Tom Tugendhat, MP for Tonbridge and Malling since 2015
- Ed Vaizey, MP for Wantage since 2005
- Giles Watling, MP for Clacton since 2017

=== Sam Gyimah ===
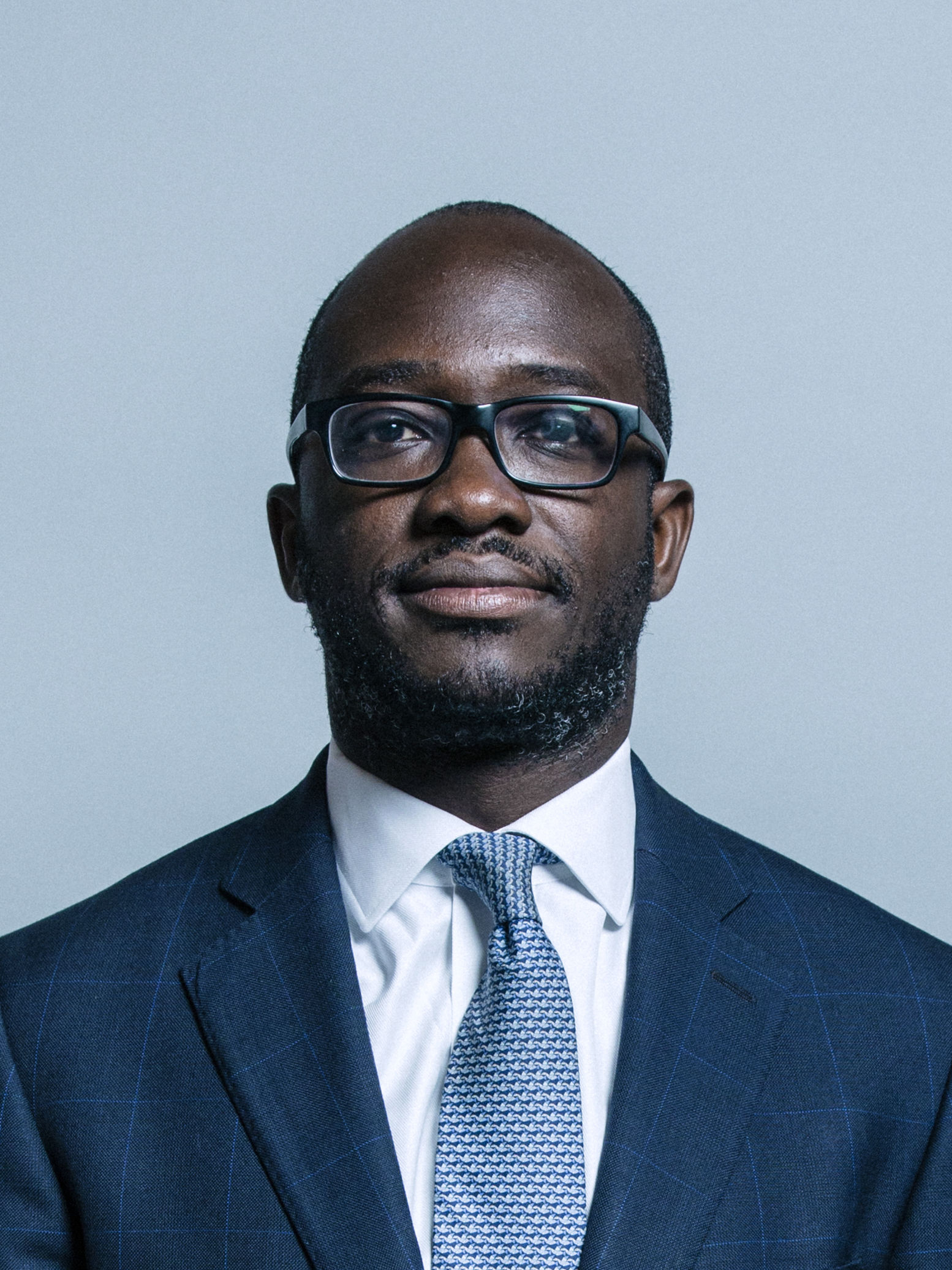
Sam Gyimah

Prior to his withdrawal on 10 June, Sam Gyimah had 4 backers among the Members of Parliament for the Conservative Party, including himself.

- Guto Bebb, MP for Aberconwy since 2010
- Dominic Grieve, Attorney General for England and Wales (2010–2014) and MP for Beaconsfield since 1997 (subsequently endorsed Stewart)
- Phillip Lee, MP for Bracknell since 2010

=== Matt Hancock ===
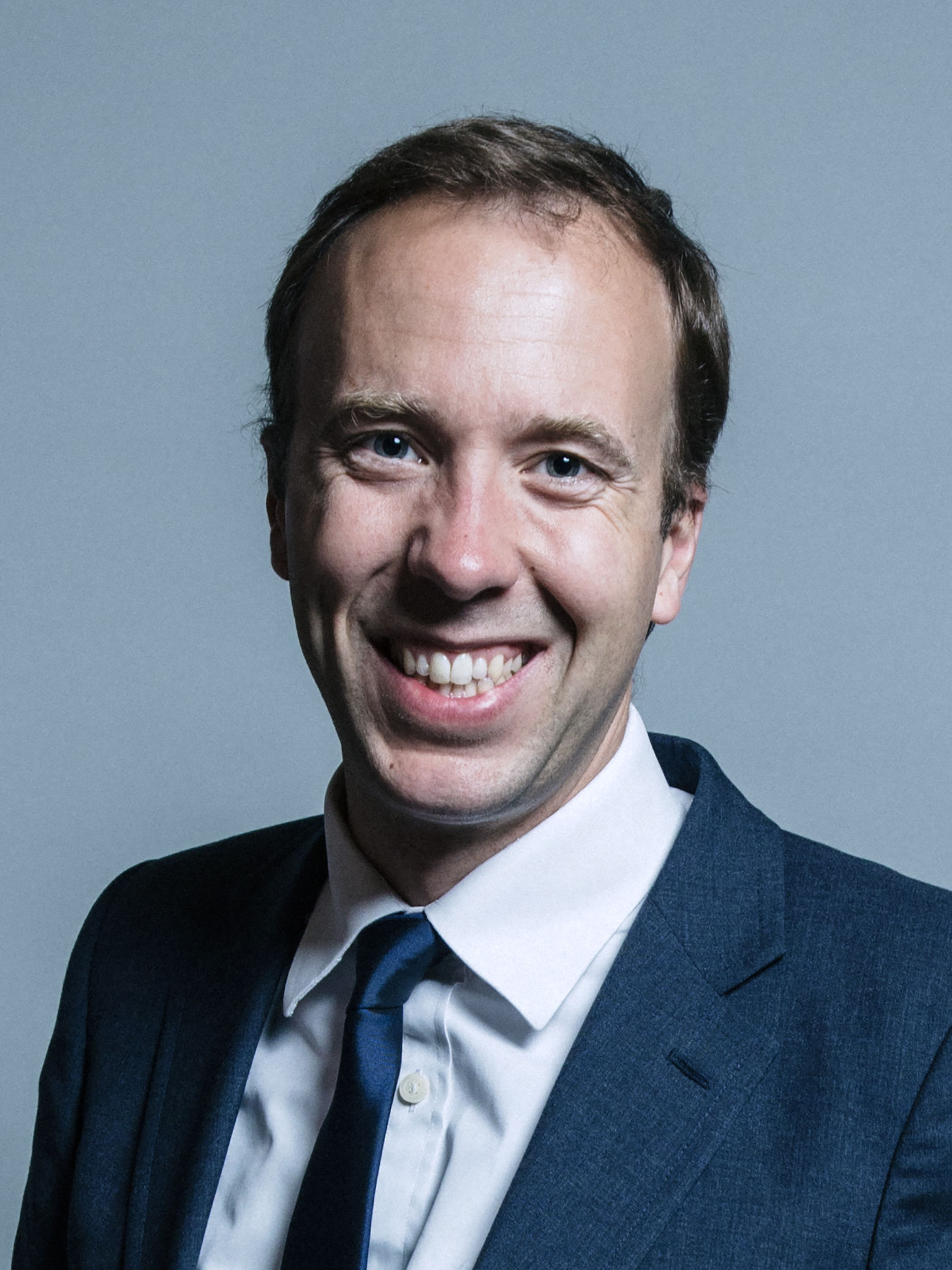
Matt Hancock (subsequently endorsed Johnson)

Prior to his withdrawal on 14 June, Matt Hancock had 17 backers among the Members of Parliament for the Conservative Party, including himself.

- Bim Afolami, MP for Hitchin and Harpenden since 2017 (subsequently endorsed Johnson)
- Andrew Bowie, MP for West Aberdeenshire and Kincardine since 2017 (subsequently endorsed Johnson)
- Alex Chalk, MP for Cheltenham since 2015
- Tracey Crouch, MP for Chatham and Aylesford since 2010 (subsequently endorsed Johnson)
- Caroline Dinenage, MP for Gosport since 2010 (subsequently endorsed Hunt)
- Jonathan Djanogly, MP for Huntingdon since 2001 (subsequently endorsed Hunt)
- Tobias Ellwood, MP for Bournemouth East since 2005 (subsequently endorsed Stewart)
- George Freeman, MP for Mid Norfolk since 2010
- Damian Green, First Secretary of State (2017) and MP for Ashford since 1997 (subsequently endorsed Johnson)
- Stephen Hammond, MP for Wimbledon since 2005
- Margot James, MP for Stourbridge since 2010 (subsequently endorsed Stewart, then Hunt)
- Seema Kennedy, MP for South Ribble since 2015
- David Lidington, Minister for the Cabinet Office since 2018 and MP for Aylesbury since 1992 (subsequently endorsed Stewart)
- Paul Masterton, MP for East Renfrewshire since 2017 (subsequently endorsed Stewart)
- Caroline Spelman, Secretary of State for Environment, Food and Rural Affairs (2010–2012) and MP for Meriden since 1997 (subsequently endorsed Stewart)
- Maggie Throup, MP for Erewash since 2015

=== Mark Harper ===
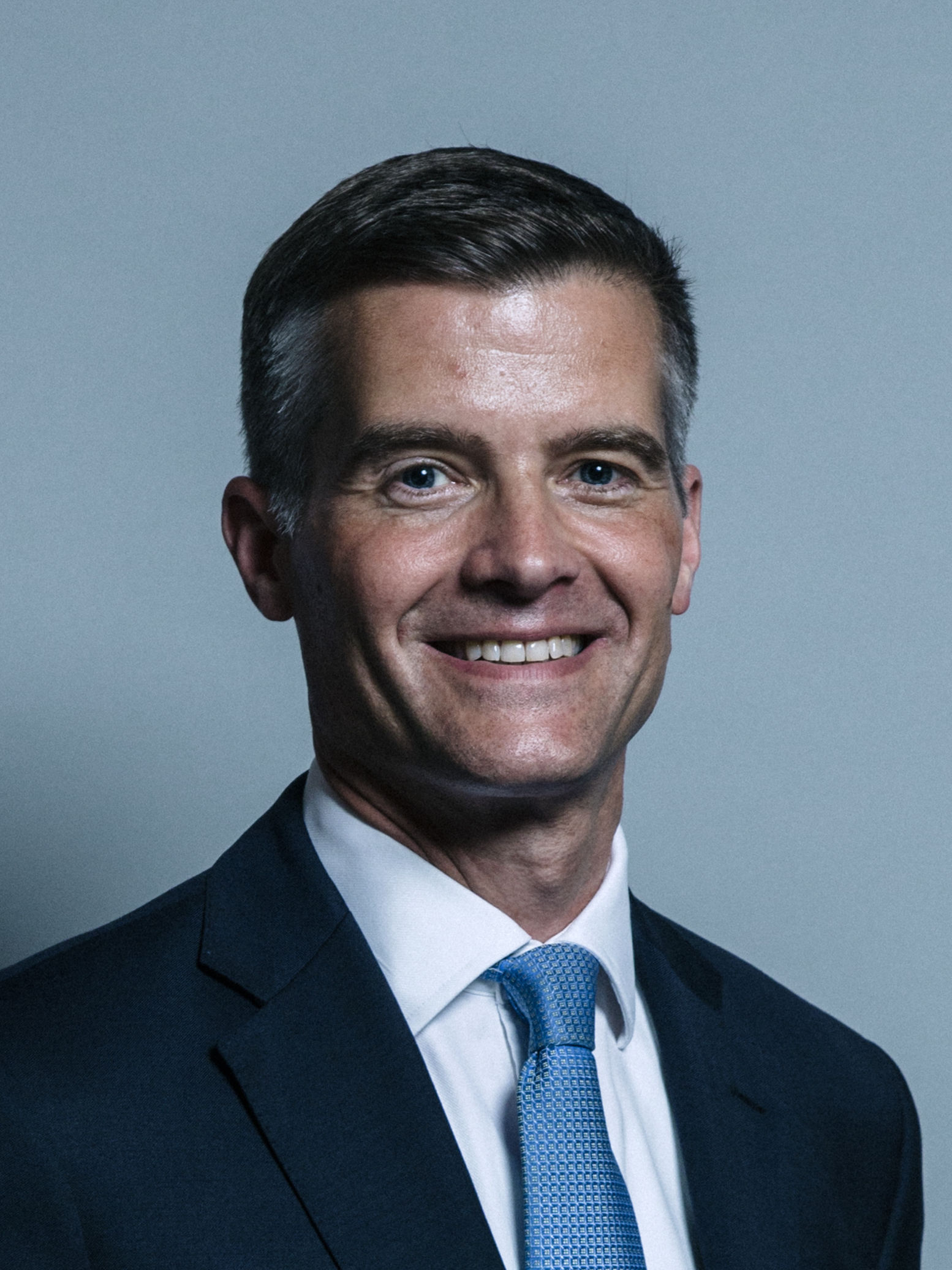
Mark Harper

Prior to his elimination on 13 June, Mark Harper had 8 backers among the Members of Parliament for the Conservative Party, including himself.

- Steve Double, MP for St Austell and Newquay since 2015
- Jackie Doyle-Price, MP for Thurrock since 2010
- David Evennett, MP for Erith and Crayford (1983–1997) and Bexleyheath and Crayford since 2005 (subsequently endorsed Johnson)
- Luke Hall, MP for Thornbury and Yate since 2015 (subsequently endorsed Javid)
- Scott Mann, MP for North Cornwall since 2015 (subsequently endorsed Johnson)
- Douglas Ross, MP for Moray since 2017 and MSP for Highlands and Islands (2016–2017) (subsequently endorsed Johnson)
- William Wragg, MP for Hazel Grove since 2015

=== Jeremy Hunt ===
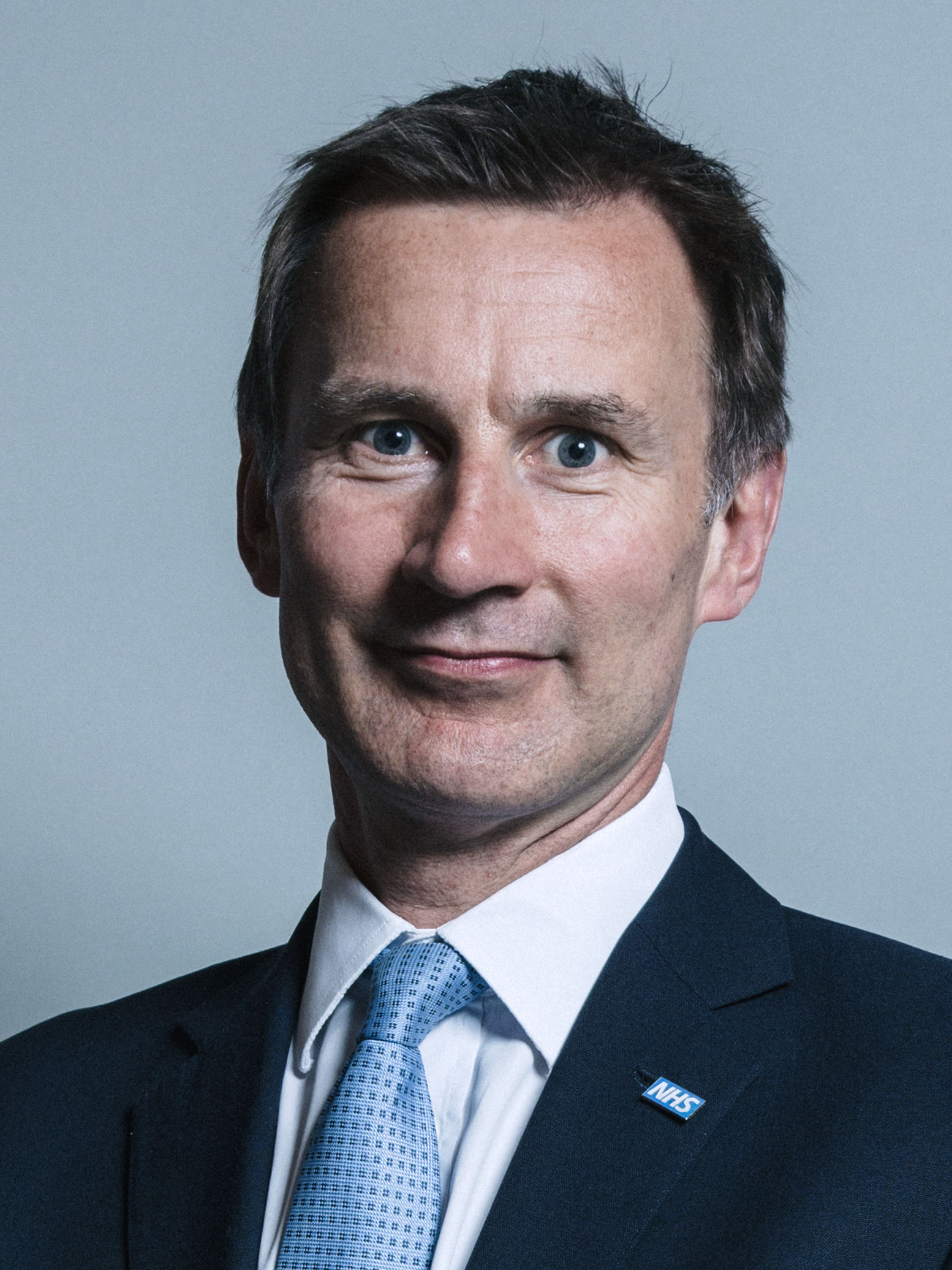
Jeremy Hunt

Prior to his elimination on 23 July, Jeremy Hunt had 50 backers among the Members of Parliament for the Conservative Party, including himself.

- Harriett Baldwin, MP for West Worcestershire since 2010
- Peter Bottomley, MP for Woolwich West (1975–1983), Eltham (1983–1997) and Worthing West since 1997
- Steve Brine, MP for Winchester since 2010
- Alistair Burt, MP for Bury North (1983–1997) and North East Bedfordshire since 2001
- James Cartlidge, MP for South Suffolk since 2015
- Jo Churchill, MP for Bury St Edmunds since 2015
- Greg Clark, Secretary of State for Business, Energy and Industrial Strategy since 2016 and MP for Tunbridge Wells since 2005
- Glyn Davies, MP for Montgomeryshire since 2010
- Caroline Dinenage, MP for Gosport since 2010
- Jonathan Djanogly, MP for Huntingdon since 2001
- Alan Duncan, MP for Rutland and Melton since 1992
- Philip Dunne, MP for Ludlow since 2005
- Mark Field, MP for the Cities of London and Westminster since 2001
- Vicky Ford, MP for Chelmsford since 2017 and MEP for the East of England (2009–2017)
- Liam Fox, Secretary of State for International Trade since 2016 and MP for North Somerset since 1992
- Mike Freer, MP for Finchley and Golders Green since 2010
- Roger Gale, MP for North Thanet since 1983
- Mark Garnier, MP for Wyre Forest since 2010
- Nus Ghani, MP for Wealden since 2015
- Robert Goodwill, MP for Scarborough and Whitby since 2005
- Richard Graham, MP for Gloucester since 2010
- Greg Hands, Chief Secretary to the Treasury (2015–2016) and MP for Chelsea and Fulham since 2005
- Oliver Heald, MP for North East Hertfordshire since 1992
- Nick Herbert, MP for Arundel and South Downs since 2005
- John Howell, MP for Henley since 2008
- Margot James, MP for Stourbridge since 2010
- Andrew Jones, MP for Harrogate and Knaresborough since 2010
- Gillian Keegan, MP for Chichester since 2017
- John Lamont, MP for Berwickshire, Roxburgh and Selkirk since 2017 and MSP for Ettrick, Roxburgh and Berwickshire (2007–2017)
- Jeremy Lefroy, MP for Stafford since 2010
- Alan Mak, MP for Havant since 2015
- Patrick McLoughlin, Chancellor of the Duchy of Lancaster (2016–2018) and MP for Derbyshire Dales since 1986
- Huw Merriman, MP for Bexhill and Battle since 2015
- Penny Mordaunt, Secretary of State for Defence since 2019 and MP for Portsmouth North since 2010
- David Morris, MP for Morecambe and Lunesdale since 2010
- James Morris, MP for Halesowen and Rowley Regis since 2010
- Wendy Morton, MP for Aldridge-Brownhills since 2015
- Sarah Newton, MP for Truro and Falmouth since 2010
- Mark Pawsey, MP for Rugby since 2010
- John Penrose, MP for Weston-super-Mare since 2005
- Mark Prisk, MP for Hertford and Stortford since 2001
- Will Quince, MP for Colchester since 2015
- Amber Rudd, Secretary of State for Work and Pensions since 2018 and MP for Hastings and Rye since 2010
- Alec Shelbrooke, MP for Elmet and Rothwell since 2010
- Keith Simpson, MP for Broadland since 2010
- Royston Smith, MP for Southampton Itchen since 2015
- Iain Stewart, MP for Milton Keynes South since 2010
- Rory Stewart, eliminated 2019 leadership candidate, Secretary of State for International Development since 2019 and MP for Penrith and The Border since 2010
- Helen Whately, MP for Faversham and Mid Kent since 2015

=== Sajid Javid ===
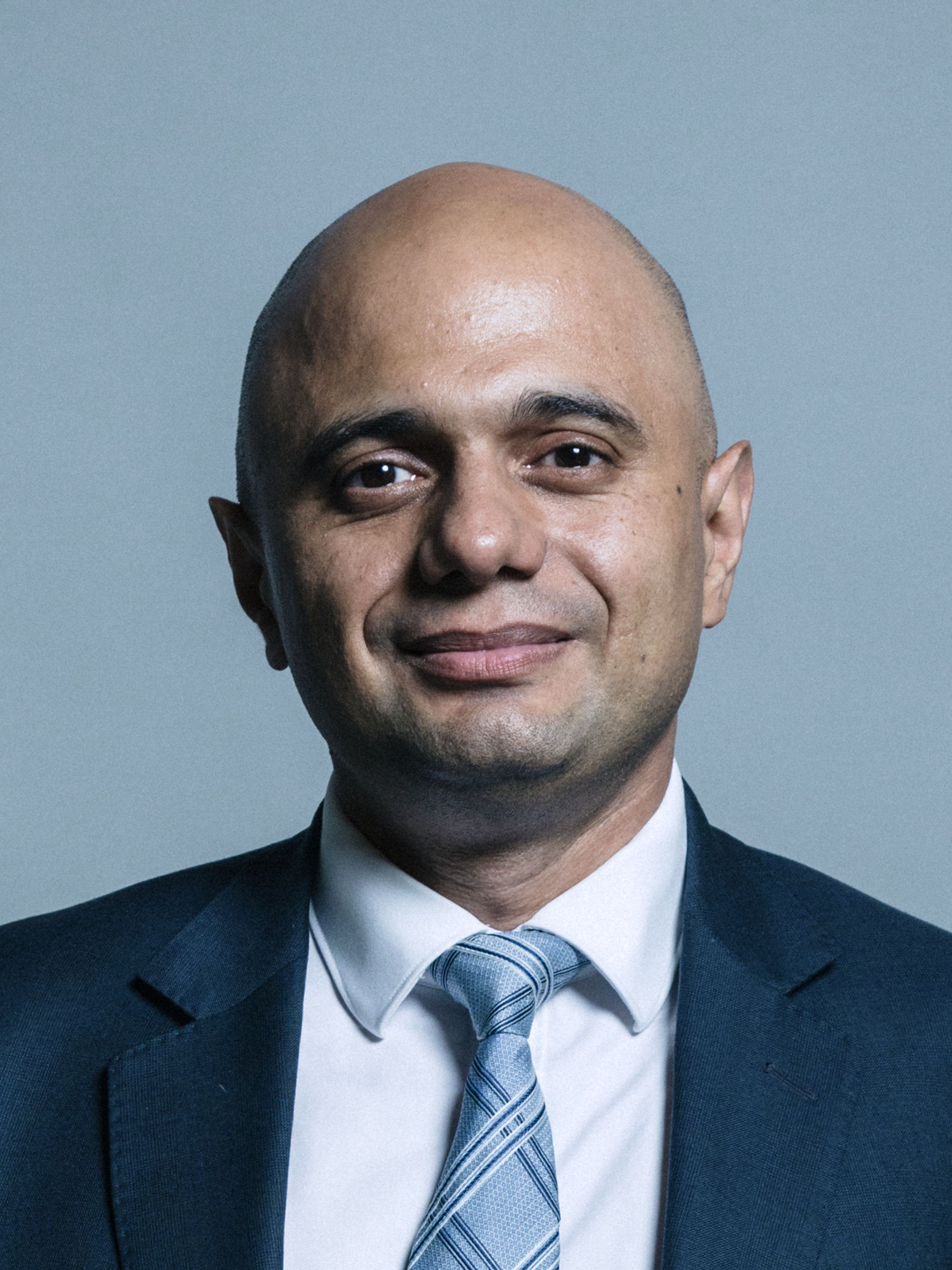
Sajid Javid (subsequently endorsed Johnson)

Prior to his elimination on 20 June, Sajid Javid had 23 backers among the Members of Parliament for the Conservative Party, including himself.

- Lucy Allan, MP for Telford since 2015
- Edward Argar, MP for Charnwood since 2015
- Victoria Atkins, MP for Louth and Horncastle since 2015
- Fiona Bruce, MP for Congleton since 2010
- Stephen Crabb, Secretary of State for Work and Pensions (2016) and MP for Preseli Pembrokeshire since 2005
- Mims Davies, MP for Eastleigh since 2015 (subsequently endorsed Johnson)
- Kevin Foster, MP for Torbay since 2015 (subsequently endorsed Johnson)
- John Glen, MP for Salisbury since 2010
- Luke Hall, MP for Thornbury and Yate since 2015
- Robert Halfon, MP for Harlow since 2010
- Simon Hoare, MP for North Dorset since 2015
- Nigel Huddleston, MP for Mid Worcestershire since 2015
- Caroline Nokes, Minister of State for Immigration since 2018 and MP for Romsey and Southampton North since 2010
- Chris Philp, MP for Croydon South since 2015 (subsequently endorsed Johnson)
- Mary Robinson, MP for Cheadle since 2015
- Andrew Selous, MP for South West Bedfordshire since 2001
- Chris Skidmore, MP for Kingswood since 2010 (subsequently endorsed Johnson)
- Gary Streeter, MP for South West Devon since 1997
- Derek Thomas, MP for St Ives since 2015
- Robin Walker, MP for Worcester since 2010
- Mike Wood, MP for Dudley South since 2015 (subsequently endorsed Johnson)
- Jeremy Wright, Secretary of State for Digital, Culture, Media and Sport since 2018 and MP for Kenilworth and Southam since 2005

=== Boris Johnson ===
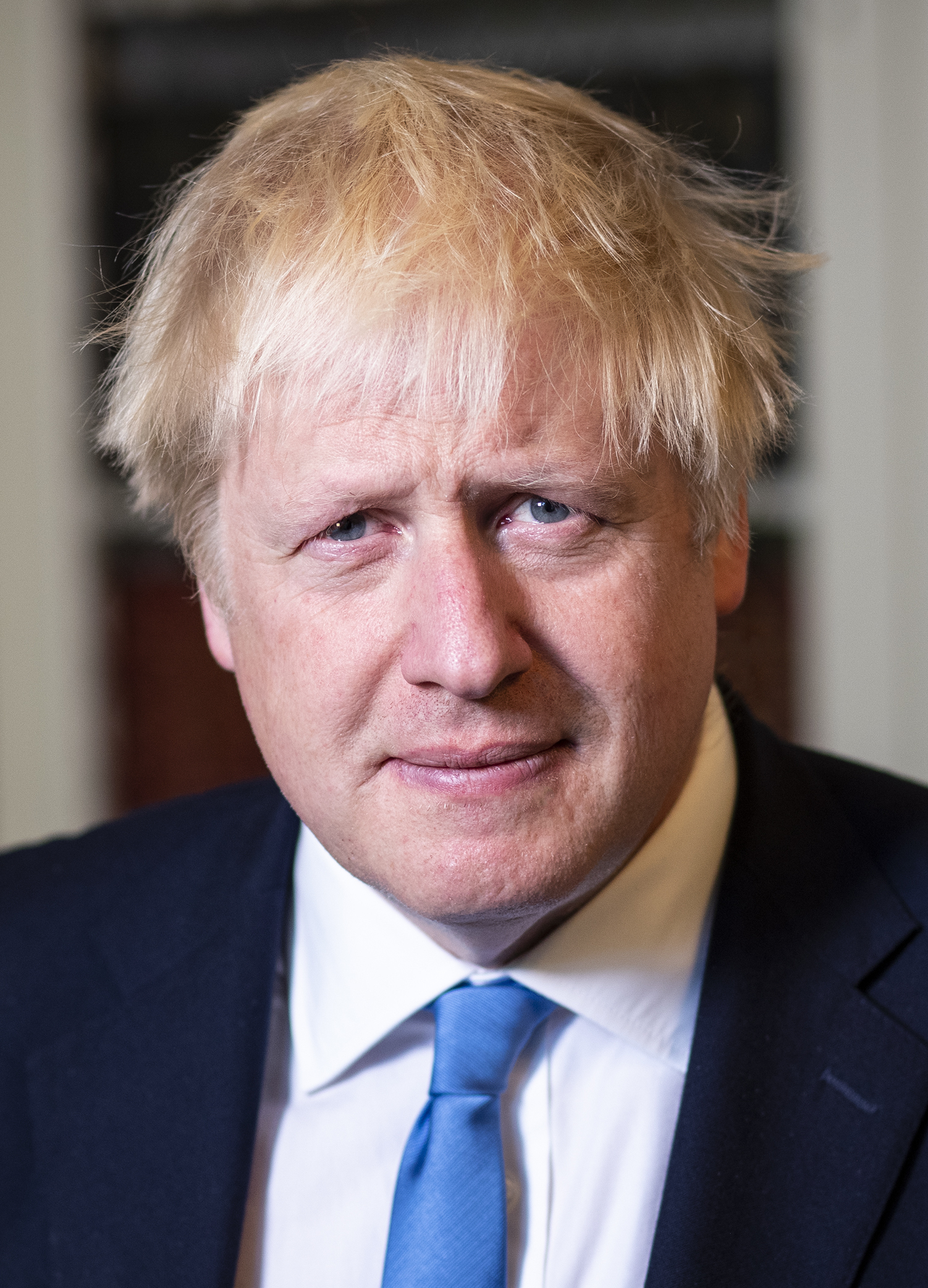
Boris Johnson

Prior to his victory on 23 July, Boris Johnson had 146 backers among the Members of Parliament for the Conservative Party, including himself.

- Nigel Adams, MP for Selby and Ainsty since 2010
- Bim Afolami, MP for Hitchin and Harpenden since 2017
- Stuart Andrew, MP for Pudsey since 2010
- Steve Baker, MP for Wycombe since 2010
- Steve Barclay, Secretary of State for Exiting the European Union since 2018 and MP for North East Cambridgeshire since 2010
- Paul Beresford, MP for Croydon Central (1992–1997) and Mole Valley since 1997
- Jake Berry, MP for Rossendale and Darwen since 2010
- Crispin Blunt, MP for Reigate since 1997
- Peter Bone, MP for Wellingborough since 2005
- Andrew Bowie, MP for West Aberdeenshire and Kincardine since 2017
- Ben Bradley, MP for Mansfield since 2017
- Suella Braverman, MP for Fareham since 2015
- Andrew Bridgen, MP for North West Leicestershire since 2010
- James Brokenshire, Secretary of State for Housing, Communities and Local Government since 2018, MP for Hornchurch (2005–2010) and Old Bexley and Sidcup since 2010
- Robert Buckland, MP for South Swindon since 2010
- Conor Burns, MP for Bournemouth West since 2010
- Alun Cairns, Secretary of State for Wales since 2016 and MP for the Vale of Glamorgan since 2010
- Bill Cash, MP for Stafford (1984–1997) and Stone since 1997
- Rehman Chishti, MP for Gillingham and Rainham since 2010
- Colin Clark, MP for Gordon since 2017
- Simon Clarke, MP for Middlesbrough South and East Cleveland since 2017
- James Cleverly, withdrawn 2019 leadership candidate and MP for Braintree since 2015
- Therese Coffey, MP for Suffolk Coastal since 2010
- Damian Collins, MP for Folkestone and Hythe since 2010
- Robert Courts, MP for Witney since 2016
- Geoffrey Cox, Attorney General for England and Wales since 2018 and MP for Torridge and West Devon since 2005
- Tracey Crouch, MP for Chatham and Aylesford since 2010
- David Davies, MP for Monmouth since 2005
- Mims Davies, MP for Eastleigh since 2015
- Philip Davies, MP for Shipley since 2005
- David Davis, Secretary of State for Exiting the European Union (2016–2018) and MP for Haltemprice and Howden since 1987
- Leo Docherty, MP for Aldershot since 2017
- Nadine Dorries, MP for Mid Bedfordshire since 2005
- Oliver Dowden, MP for Hertsmere since 2015
- Richard Drax, MP for South Dorset since 2010
- James Duddridge, MP for Rochford and Southend East since 2005
- Iain Duncan Smith, Leader of the Conservative Party (2001–2003), Secretary of State for Work and Pensions (2010–2016) and MP for Chingford and Woodford Green since 1992
- Michael Ellis, MP for Northampton North since 2010
- Charlie Elphicke, MP for Dover since 2010
- Nigel Evans, MP for Ribble Valley since 1992
- David Evennett, MP for Erith and Crayford (1983–1997) and Bexleyheath and Crayford since 2005
- Michael Fallon, Secretary of State for Defence (2014–2017), MP for Darlington (1983–1992) and Sevenoaks since 1997
- Kevin Foster, MP for Torbay since 2015
- Mark Francois, MP for Rayleigh and Wickford since 2001
- Lucy Frazer, MP for South East Cambridgeshire since 2015
- Marcus Fysh, MP for Yeovil since 2015
- Zac Goldsmith, MP for Richmond Park (2010–2016; since 2017)
- Helen Grant, MP for Maidstone and The Weald since 2010
- Chris Grayling, Secretary of State for Transport since 2016 and MP for Epsom and Ewell since 2001
- Chris Green, MP for Bolton West since 2015
- Damian Green, First Secretary of State (2017) and MP for Ashford since 1997
- Andrew Griffiths, MP for Burton since 2010
- Robert Halfon, MP for Harlow since 2010
- Matt Hancock, withdrawn 2019 leadership candidate and MP for West Suffolk since 2010
- Simon Hart, MP for Carmarthen West and South Pembrokeshire since 2010
- James Heappey, MP for Wells since 2015
- Chris Heaton-Harris, MP for Daventry since 2010
- Adam Holloway, MP for Gravesham since 2005
- Eddie Hughes, MP for Walsall North since 2017
- Sajid Javid, eliminated 2019 leadership candidate, Home Secretary since 2018 and MP for Bromsgrove since 2010
- Ranil Jayawardena, MP for North East Hampshire since 2015
- Bernard Jenkin, MP for Harwich and North Essex since 1992
- Andrea Jenkyns, MP for Morley and Outwood since 2015
- Robert Jenrick, MP for Newark since 2014
- Caroline Johnson, MP for Sleaford and North Hykeham since 2016
- Gareth Johnson, MP for Dartford since 2010
- Jo Johnson, MP for Orpington since 2010
- David Jones, Secretary of State for Wales (2012–2014) and MP for Clwyd West since 2005
- Daniel Kawczynski, MP for Shrewsbury and Atcham since 2005
- Greg Knight, MP for Derby North (1983–1997) and East Yorkshire since 2001
- Kwasi Kwarteng, MP for Spelthorne since 2010
- Mark Lancaster, MP for MP for Milton Keynes North East (2005–2010) and Milton Keynes North since 2010
- Andrea Leadsom, eliminated 2019 leadership candidate, Leader of the House of Commons (2017–19) and MP for South Northamptonshire since 2010
- Andrew Lewer, MP for Northampton South since 2017
- Julian Lewis, MP for New Forest East since 1997
- Ian Liddell-Grainger, MP for Bridgwater and West Somerset since 2001
- Jack Lopresti, MP for Filton and Bradley Stoke since 2010
- Tim Loughton, MP for East Worthing and Shoreham since 1997
- Craig Mackinlay, MP for South Thanet since 2015
- Anne Main, MP for St Albans since 2005
- Kit Malthouse, withdrawn 2019 leadership candidate and MP for North West Hampshire since 2015
- Scott Mann, MP for North Cornwall since 2015
- Paul Maynard, MP for Blackpool North and Cleveleys since 2010
- Anne Marie Morris, MP for Newton Abbot since 2010
- Stephen McPartland, MP for Stevenage since 2010
- Esther McVey, eliminated 2019 leadership candidate, Secretary of State for Work and Pensions (2018) and MP for Tatton since 2017
- Johnny Mercer, MP for Plymouth Moor View since 2015
- Stephen Metcalfe, MP for South Basildon and East Thurrock since 2010
- Amanda Milling, MP for Cannock Chase since 2015
- Nigel Mills, MP for Amber Valley since 2010
- Andrew Mitchell, Chief Whip of the House of Commons (2012), MP for Gedling (1987–1997) and Sutton Coldfield since 2001
- Damien Moore, MP for Southport since 2017
- Sheryll Murray, MP for South East Cornwall since 2010
- Andrew Murrison, MP for South West Wiltshire since 2001
- Matthew Offord, MP for Hendon since 2010
- Priti Patel, Secretary of State for International Development (2016–2017) and MP for Witham since 2010
- Owen Paterson, Secretary of State for Environment, Food and Rural Affairs (2012–2014) and MP for North Shropshire since 1997
- Mike Penning, MP for Hemel Hempstead since 2005
- Andrew Percy, MP for Brigg and Goole since 2010
- Chris Philp, MP for Croydon South since 2015
- Chris Pincher, MP for Tamworth since 2010
- Rebecca Pow, MP for Taunton Deane since 2015
- Mark Pritchard, MP for The Wrekin since 2005
- Tom Pursglove, MP for Corby since 2015
- Dominic Raab, eliminated 2019 leadership candidate, Secretary of State for Exiting the European Union (2018) and MP for Esher and Walton since 2010
- John Redwood, Secretary of State for Wales (1993–1995) and MP for Wokingham since 1987
- Jacob Rees-Mogg, MP for North East Somerset since 2010
- Laurence Robertson, MP for Tewkesbury since 1997
- Andrew Rosindell, MP for Romford since 2001
- Douglas Ross, MP for Moray since 2017 and MSP for Highlands and Islands (2016–2017)
- Lee Rowley, MP for North East Derbyshire since 2017
- Grant Shapps, Minister without Portfolio (2012–2015) and MP for Welwyn Hatfield since 2005
- Alok Sharma, MP for Reading West since 2010
- Chloe Smith, MP for Norwich North since 2009
- Bob Seely, MP for the Isle of Wight since 2017
- Chris Skidmore, MP for Kingswood since 2010
- Henry Smith, MP for Crawley since 2010
- Andrew Stephenson, MP for Pendle since 2010
- Bob Stewart, MP for Beckenham since 2010
- Graham Stuart, MP for Beverley and Holderness since 2005
- Julian Sturdy, MP for York Outer since 2010
- Rishi Sunak, MP for Richmond (Yorks) since 2015
- Desmond Swayne, MP for New Forest West since 1997
- Hugo Swire, MP for East Devon since 2001
- Robert Syms, MP for Poole since 1997
- Ross Thomson, MP for Aberdeen South since 2017 and MSP for NE Scotland (2016–2017)
- Kelly Tolhurst, MP for Rochester and Strood since 2015
- Michael Tomlinson, MP for Mid Dorset and North Poole since 2015
- Justin Tomlinson, MP for North Swindon since 2010
- Craig Tracey, MP for North Warwickshire since 2015
- David Tredinnick, MP for Bosworth since 1987
- Anne-Marie Trevelyan, MP for Berwick-upon-Tweed since 2015
- Liz Truss, Chief Secretary to the Treasury since 2017 and MP for South West Norfolk since 2010
- Shailesh Vara, MP for North West Cambridgeshire since 2005
- Martin Vickers, MP for Cleethorpes since 2010
- Theresa Villiers, Secretary of State for Northern Ireland (2012–2016) and MP for Chipping Barnet since 2005
- Ben Wallace, MP for Wyre and Preston North since 2005
- David Warburton, MP for Somerton and Frome since 2015
- Matt Warman, MP for Boston and Skegness since 2015
- Heather Wheeler, MP for South Derbyshire since 2010
- John Whittingdale, Secretary of State for Culture, Media and Sport (2015–2016) and MP for Maldon since 1992
- Bill Wiggin, MP for North Herefordshire since 2001
- Gavin Williamson, Secretary of State for Defence (2017–2019) and MP for South Staffordshire since 2010
- Mike Wood, MP for Dudley South since 2015
- Nadhim Zahawi, MP for Stratford-on-Avon since 2010

=== Andrea Leadsom ===
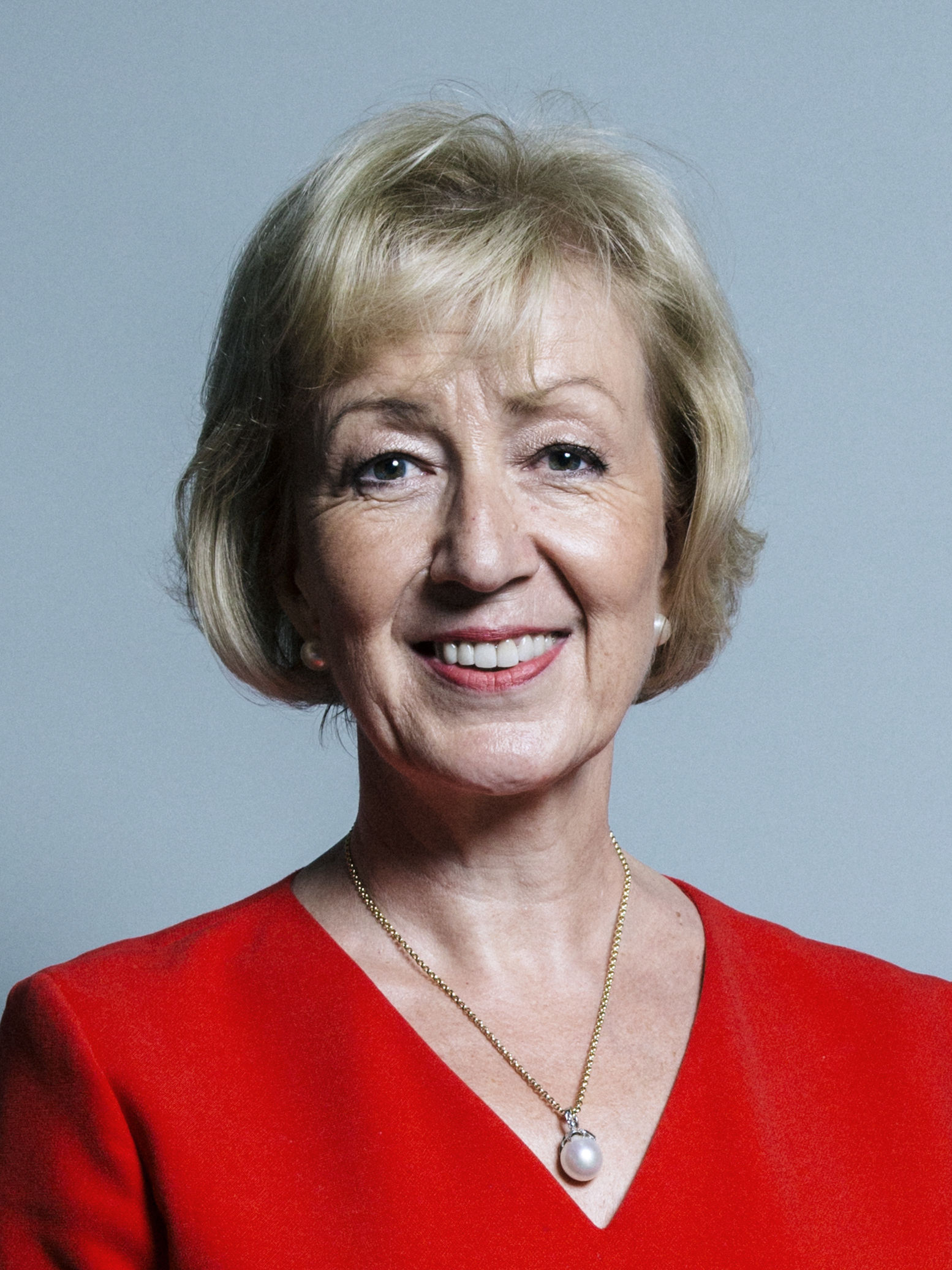
Andrea Leadsom (subsequently endorsed Johnson)

Prior to her elimination on 13 June, Andrea Leadsom had five backers among the Members of Parliament for the Conservative Party, including herself.

- Chris Heaton-Harris, MP for Daventry since 2010 (subsequently endorsed Johnson)
- Tim Loughton, MP for East Worthing and Shoreham since 1997 (subsequently endorsed Johnson)
- Heather Wheeler, MP for South Derbyshire since 2010 (subsequently endorsed Johnson)
- Derek Thomas, MP for St Ives since 2015 (subsequently endorsed Javid)

=== Kit Malthouse ===
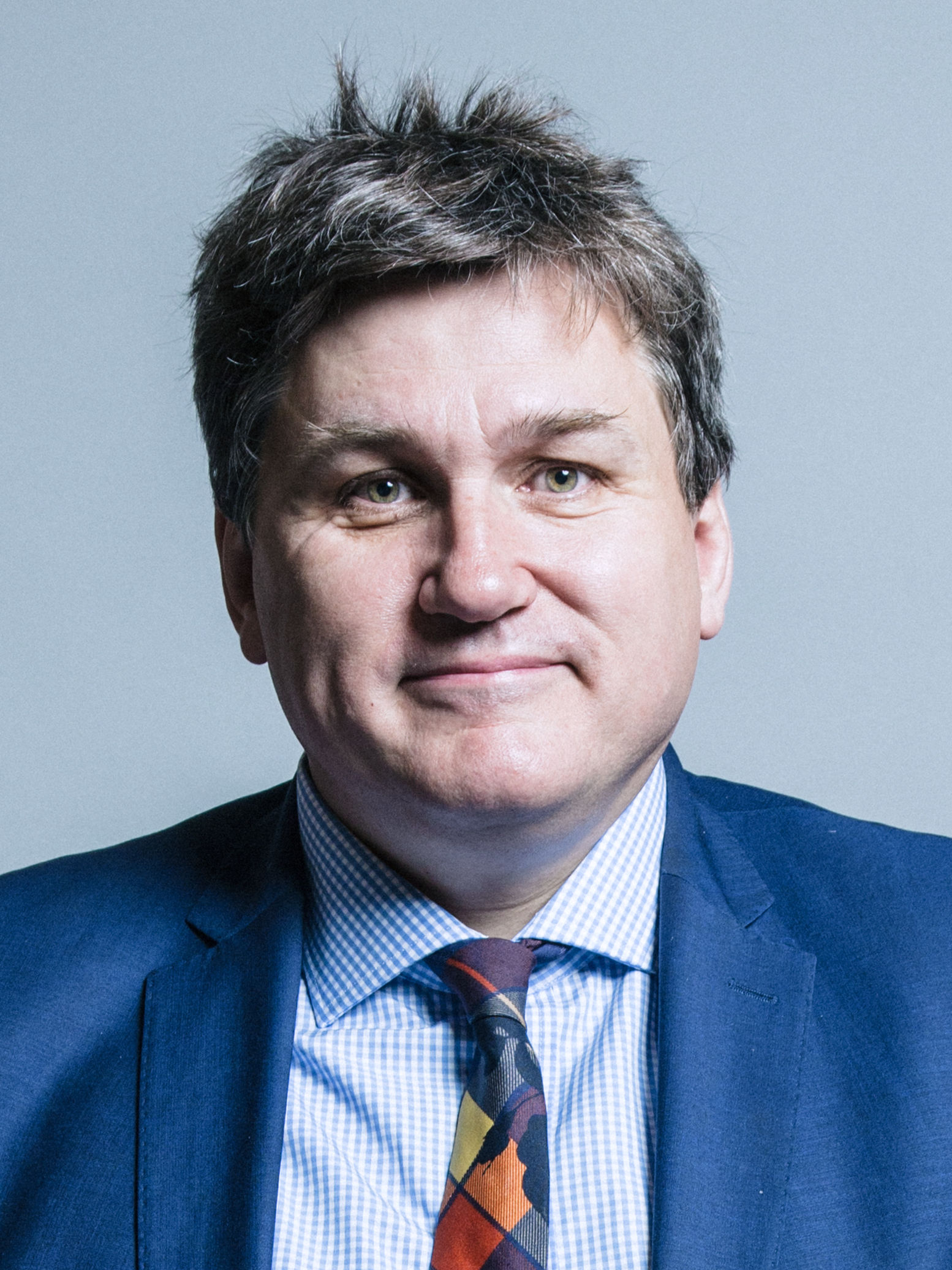
Kit Malthouse (subsequently endorsed Johnson)

Prior to his withdrawal on 4 June, Kit Malthouse had seven backers among the Members of Parliament for the Conservative Party, including himself.

- Richard Benyon, MP for Newbury since 2005 (subsequently endorsed Stewart)
- Alex Burghart, MP for Brentwood and Ongar since 2017
- George Hollingbery, MP for Meon Valley since 2010
- Paul Maynard, MP for Blackpool North and Cleveleys since 2010 (subsequently endorsed Johnson)
- Sarah Newton, MP for Truro and Falmouth since 2010(subsequently endorsed Hunt)
- Royston Smith, MP for Southampton Itchen since 2015 (subsequently endorsed Hunt)

=== Esther McVey ===
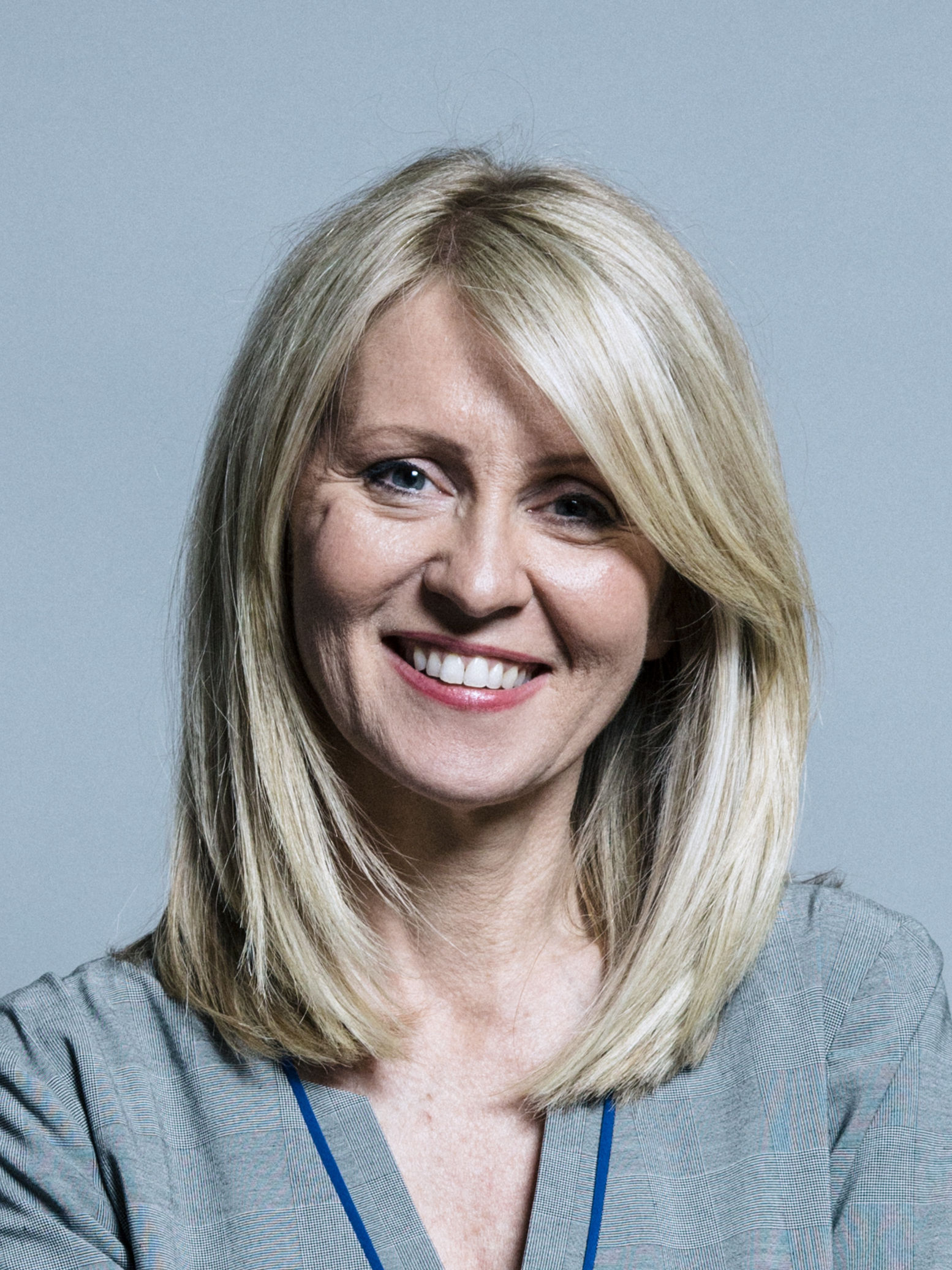
Esther McVey (subsequently endorsed Johnson)

Prior to her elimination on 13 June, Esther McVey had six backers among the Members of Parliament for the Conservative Party, including herself.

- Ben Bradley, MP for Mansfield since 2017 (subsequently endorsed Johnson)
- Philip Davies, MP for Shipley since 2005 (subsequently endorsed Johnson)
- Pauline Latham, MP for Mid Derbyshire since 2010
- Andrew Lewer, MP for Northampton South since 2017 (subsequently endorsed Johnson)
- Gary Streeter, MP for Plymouth Sutton (1992–1997) and South West Devon since 1997 (subsequently endorsed Javid)

=== Dominic Raab ===
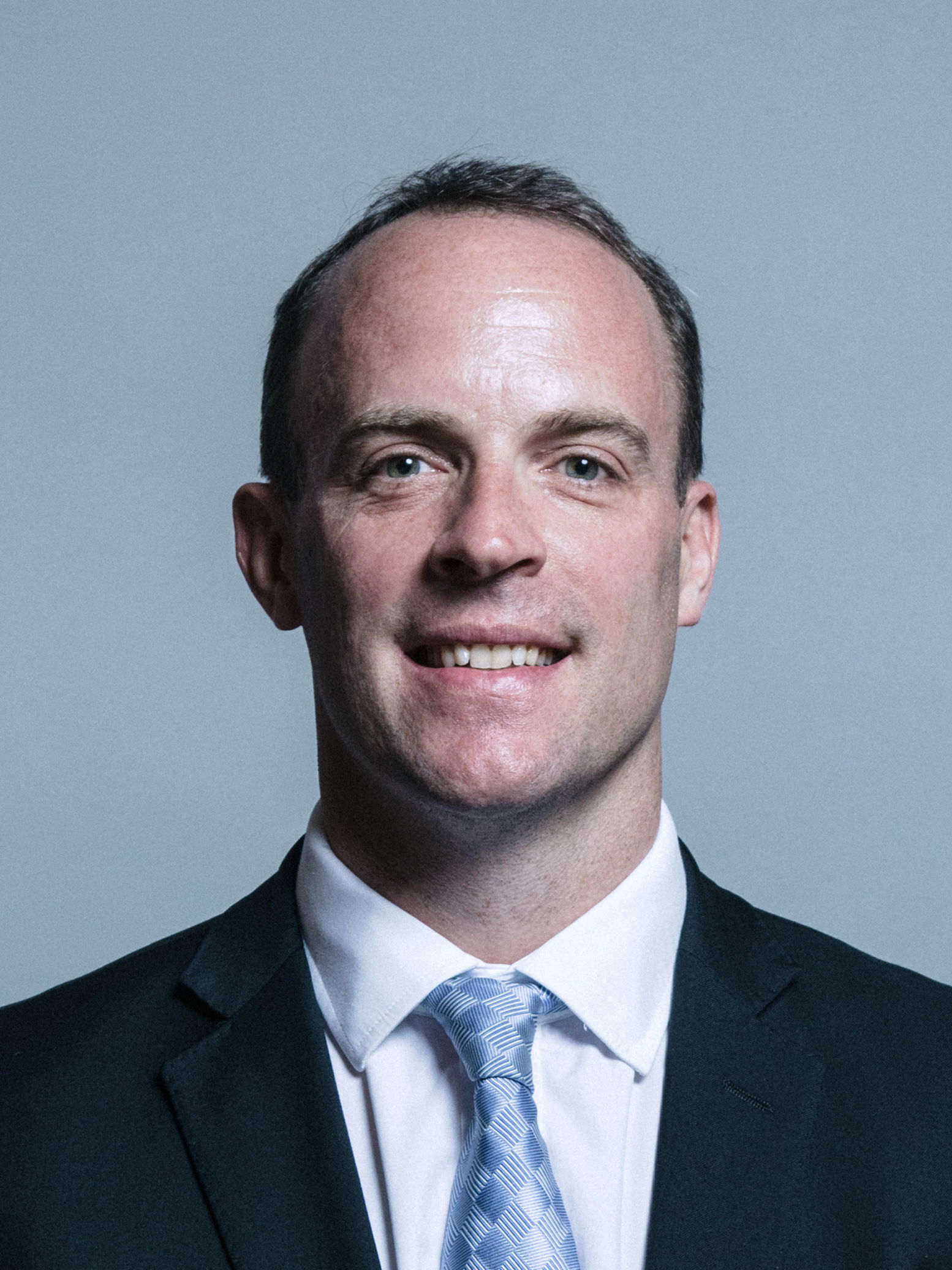
Dominic Raab (subsequently endorsed Johnson)

Prior to his elimination on 18 June, Dominic Raab had 25 backers among the Members of Parliament for the Conservative Party, including himself.

- David Amess, MP for Southend West since 1997
- John Baron, MP for Basildon and Billericay since 2001
- Henry Bellingham, MP for North West Norfolk (1983–1997; since 2001)
- Suella Braverman, MP for Fareham since 2015 (subsequently endorsed Johnson)
- Maria Caulfield, MP for Lewes since 2015
- Rehman Chishti, MP for Gillingham and Rainham since 2010 (subsequently endorsed Johnson)
- Robert Courts, MP for Witney since 2016 (subsequently endorsed Johnson)
- David Davies, MP for Monmouth since 2005 (subsequently endorsed Johnson)
- David Davis, Secretary of State for Exiting the European Union (2016–2018) and MP for Haltemprice and Howden since 1987 (subsequently endorsed Johnson)
- Helen Grant, MP for Maidstone and The Weald since 2010 (subsequently endorsed Johnson)
- Chris Green, MP for Bolton West since 2015 (subsequently endorsed Johnson)
- Eddie Hughes, MP for Walsall North since 2017 (subsequently endorsed Johnson)
- Andrea Jenkyns, MP for Morley and Outwood since 2015 (subsequently endorsed Johnson)
- Gareth Johnson, MP for Dartford since 2010(subsequently endorsed Johnson)
- Jonathan Lord, MP for Woking since 2010
- Stephen Metcalfe, MP for South Basildon and East Thurrock since 2010 (subsequently endorsed Gove)
- Maria Miller, Secretary of State for Culture, Media and Sport (2012–2014) and MP for Basingstoke since 2005
- Anne-Marie Morris, MP for Newton Abbot since 2010 (subsequently endorsed Johnson)
- Andrew Murrison, MP for South West Wiltshire since 2001 (subsequently endorsed Johnson)
- Tom Pursglove, MP for Corby since 2015 (subsequently endorsed Johnson)
- Robert Syms, MP for Poole since 1997 (subsequently endorsed Johnson)
- Michael Tomlinson, MP for Mid Dorset and North Poole since 2015(subsequently endorsed Johnson)
- Shailesh Vara, MP for North West Cambridgeshire since 2005 (subsequently endorsed Johnson)
- Nadhim Zahawi, MP for Stratford-on-Avon since 2010 (subsequently endorsed Johnson)

=== Rory Stewart ===
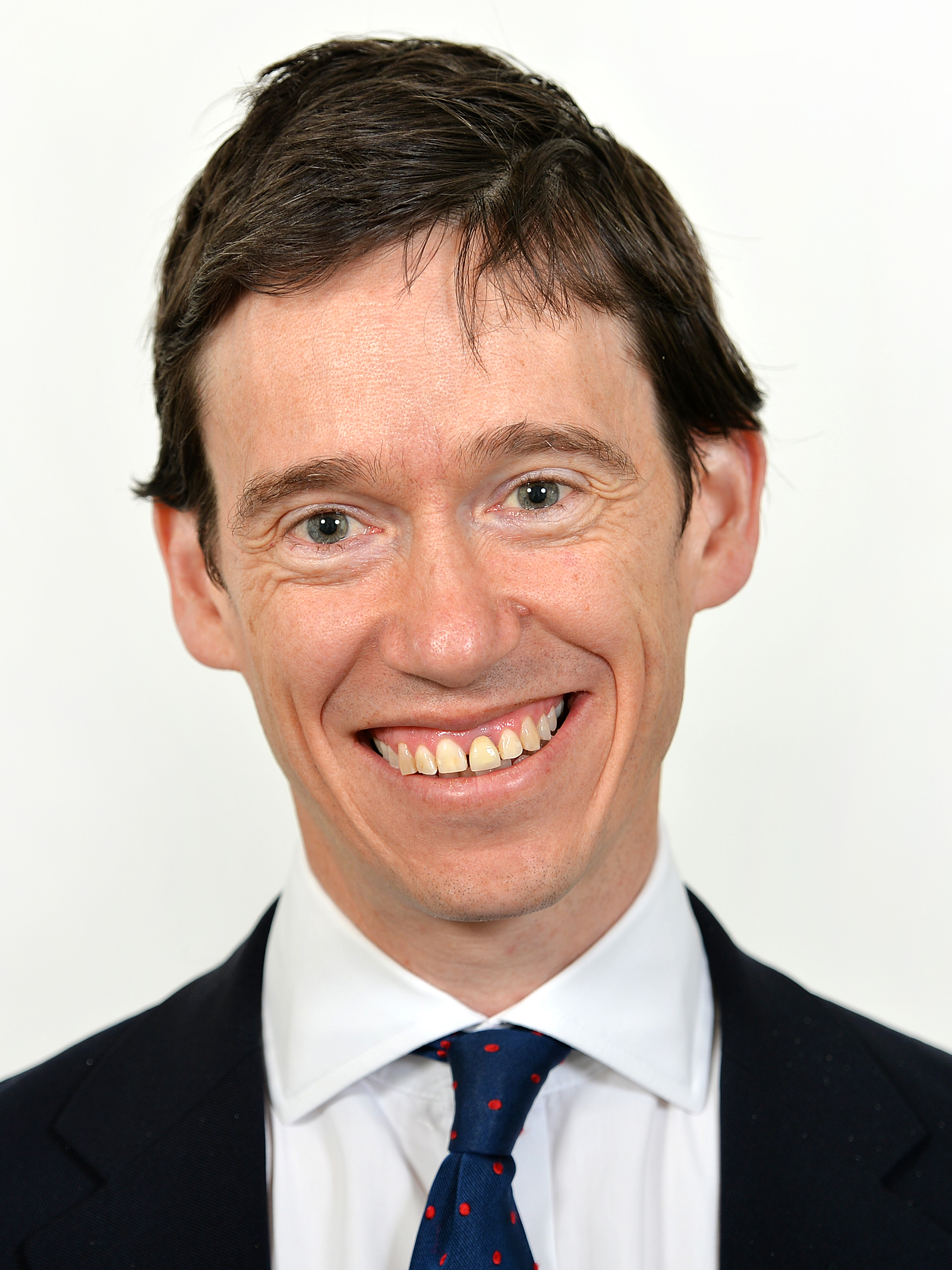
Rory Stewart (subsequently endorsed Hunt)

Prior to his elimination on 19 June, Rory Stewart had 14 backers among the Members of Parliament for the Conservative Party, including himself.

- Richard Benyon, MP for Newbury since 2005
- Kenneth Clarke, Father of the House since 2017 and MP for Rushcliffe since 1970
- Tobias Ellwood, MP for Bournemouth East since 2005
- David Gauke, Secretary of State for Justice since 2018 and MP for South West Hertfordshire since 2005
- Dominic Grieve, Attorney General for England and Wales (2010–2014) and MP for Beaconsfield since 1997
- Margot James, MP for Stourbridge since 2010 (subsequently endorsed Hunt)
- Gillian Keegan, MP for Chichester since 2017(subsequently endorsed Hunt)
- David Lidington, Minister for the Cabinet Office since 2018 and MP for Aylesbury since 1992
- Paul Masterton, MP for East Renfrewshire since 2017
- Victoria Prentis, MP for Banbury since 2015
- Antoinette Sandbach, MP for Eddisbury since 2015
- Nicholas Soames, MP for Crawley (1983–1997) and Mid Sussex since 1997
- Caroline Spelman, Secretary of State for Environment, Food and Rural Affairs (2010–2012) and MP for Meriden since 1997

== Members of the European Parliament ==
=== Michael Gove ===
- Nosheena Mobarik, MEP for Scotland since 2019

== Former Cabinet ministers ==
=== Jeremy Hunt ===
- William Hague, First Secretary of State (2010–2015), Leader of the Conservative Party (1997–2001) and MP for Richmond (Yorks) (1989–2015)
- John Major, Prime Minister of the United Kingdom (1990–1997) and MP for Huntingdon (1979–2001)

=== Boris Johnson ===
- John Nott, Secretary of State for Defence (1981–1983) and MP for St Ives (1966–1983)
- George Osborne, First Secretary of State (2015–2016), Chancellor of the Exchequer (2010–2016) and MP for Tatton (2001–2017)

== Former MPs and MEPs ==
=== Jeremy Hunt ===
- Ben Howlett, MP for Bath (2015–2017)
- Rob Wilson, MP for Reading East (2005–2017)

=== Boris Johnson ===
- Janice Atkinson, independent (formerly UKIP, until 2015) MEP for South East England (2014–2019) and Vice President of Europe of Nations and Freedom (2015–2019)
- David Campbell Bannerman, MEP for the East of England (2009–2019)
- Ashley Fox, MEP for South West England and Gibraltar (2009–2019) and Leader of the Conservatives in the European Parliament (2014–2019)
- Stewart Jackson, MP for Peterborough (2005–2017)
- Karl McCartney, MP for Lincoln (2010–2017)
- James Wharton, MP for Stockton South (2010–2017)

=== Rory Stewart ===
- Sajjad Karim, MEP for North West England (2004–2019)

== Peers ==
=== Jeremy Hunt ===
- Michael Ashcroft, Deputy Chairman of the Conservative Party (2005–2010) and life peer since 2000

=== Sajid Javid ===
- Susan Williams, life peer since 2013

=== Boris Johnson ===
- Tariq Ahmad, Minister of State for the Commonwealth and United Nations since 2017
- Anthony Bamford, life peer since 2013
- Michael Dobbs, life peer since 2010
- Sir Bernard Hogan-Howe, Metropolitan Police Commissioner (2011–2017)
- Alan Sugar, businessman and crossbench peer

== Members of devolved legislatures ==
=== Michael Gove ===
- Ruth Davidson, Leader of the Scottish Conservatives since 2011, MSP for Glasgow (2011–2016) and Edinburgh Central since 2016
- Rachael Hamilton, MSP for South Scotland (2016–2017) and Ettrick, Roxburgh and Berwickshire since 2017 (subsequently endorsed Hunt)

=== Jeremy Hunt ===
- Andrew Boff, Member of the London Assembly since 2008 and Leader of the London Assembly Conservative Group (2012–2016)

=== Sajid Javid ===
- Ruth Davidson, Leader of the Scottish Conservatives since 2011, MSP for Glasgow (2011–2016) and Edinburgh Central since 2016 (subsequently endorsed Gove)
- Annie Wells, MSP for Glasgow since 2016

=== Boris Johnson ===
- Michelle Ballantyne, MSP for South Scotland since 2017
- Margaret Mitchell, MSP for Central Scotland since 2003
- Darren Millar, AM for Clwyd West since 2007
- Andrew R. T. Davies, Leader of the Welsh Conservatives (2011–2018) and AM for South Wales Central since 2007
- Gareth Bacon, Member of the London Assembly as an additional member (2008–2016), for Bexley and Bromley since 2016 and Leader of the London Assembly Conservative Group since 2016
- Steve O'Connell, Member of the London Assembly for Croydon and Sutton since 2008
- Keith Prince, Member of the London Assembly for Havering and Redbridge since 2016
- Tony Devenish, Member of the London Assembly for West Central since 2016

=== Rory Stewart ===
- Donald Cameron, MSP for the Highlands and Islands since 2016
- Finlay Carson, MSP for Galloway and West Dumfries since 2016
- Murdo Fraser, MSP for Mid Scotland and Fife since 2001 (subsequently endorsed Hunt)
- Adam Tomkins, MSP for Glasgow since 2016

== Directly elected mayors ==
=== Boris Johnson ===
- Ben Houchen, Tees Valley Mayor since 2017

== Police and Crime Commissioners ==
=== Boris Johnson ===
- Marc Jones, Lincolnshire Police and Crime Commissioner since 2016
- Alison Hernandez, Devon and Cornwall Police and Crime Commissioner since 2016
- Roger Hirst, Essex Police and Crime Commissioner since 2016
- Lorne Green, Norfolk Police and Crime Commissioner since 2016
- Stephen Mold, Northamptonshire Police and Crime Commissioner since 2016
- Anthony Stansfeld, Thames Valley Police and Crime Commissioner since 2012
- Philip Seccombe, Warwickshire Police and Crime Commissioner since 2016

== Individuals ==
=== Matt Hancock ===
- Rupert Harrison, economist and former government special advisor
- Robert Rinder, criminal barrister and television personality

=== Jeremy Hunt ===
- Matthew Syed, author and former Olympian

=== Sajid Javid ===
- Matthew Elliott, political strategist and lobbyist
- Rami Ranger, businessman
- Ian Taylor, businessman

=== Boris Johnson ===
- Nimco Ali, activist
- Robin Birley, businessman and entrepreneur
- Tim Dawson, screenwriter
- Giles Fraser, Anglican priest, journalist and broadcaster
- Katie Hopkins, media personality and columnist
- Christian Jessen, television presenter and doctor
- Tim Martin, businessman and founder of Wetherspoons
- Winston Peters, Deputy Prime Minister of New Zealand since 2017 and Leader of New Zealand First since 1993
- Paul Staines, political blogger
- Tim Stanley, journalist
- Donald Trump, President of the United States since 2017

=== Rory Stewart ===
- Brian Cox, physicist
- Gary Lineker, sports broadcaster and retired professional footballer
- Mark Mitchell, National Party Member of the New Zealand Parliament for Rodney since 2011

== Organisations ==
=== Matt Hancock ===
- Tattersalls

=== Boris Johnson ===
- Turning Point UK
- Leave.EU

=== Dominic Raab ===
- Arbuthnot Banking Group

== Publications ==
Publications	2017 general election main endorsement	Candidate	Notes	Link
ConservativeHome	Conservative Party	Boris Johnson		
Evening Standard	Conservative Party	Boris Johnson		
The Daily Telegraph	Conservative Party	Boris Johnson		
The Sunday Telegraph	Conservative Party	Boris Johnson		
The Sun	Conservative Party	Boris Johnson		
The Times	Conservative Party	Boris Johnson		
The Sunday Times	Conservative Party	Boris Johnson		
