= Thames Valley =

Area of south east England along the River Thames

The area covered by Thames Valley Police

The Thames Valley is a geographical and political area in South East England around the River Thames west of London. Most definitions include Berkshire and Oxfordshire, and the area can also include Buckinghamshire and Swindon.

The Thames Valley Police provides policing for Berkshire, Oxfordshire and Buckinghamshire.

As of 2026, Berkshire, Oxfordshire and Swindon are proposing to form a Thames Valley mayoral strategic authority.

The area is an important tourist destination and economic hub. The south of the region is on the M4 corridor and the Great Western Main Line linking London and the West, and is close to Heathrow Airport. The north has Oxford University and Oxford Brookes University.

The Thames Valley is a national character area defined by Natural England. The character area covers southeast Berkshire, northern Surrey and parts of London. The physical geography of the rest of the region is defined by the Chiltern Hills and the Upper Thames Vale around Oxford.

== History ==
Early humans settled in the Thames Valley because of its fertile land and abundant water. Tools and remains from these periods have been found near the river. Settlements and farming communities developed. The river was crucial for trade and transport. During the Iron Age, hill forts, like those in the surrounding Chiltern Hills, were built for defence.

The Romans recognized the Thames Valley’s strategic importance. Key Roman towns included Dorchester-on-Thames and Streatley, which served as trading and administrative centers. Roman roads crossed the valley, connecting it to London and other settlements. After Roman withdrawal, the Thames Valley saw the arrival of Anglo-Saxon settlers. The area became part of the kingdoms of Wessex and Mercia. Settlements like Reading and Abingdon emerged during this period. The river continued to serve as a key trade and transport route.

The Norman Conquest of 1066 brought castles, monasteries, and manorial systems. Important medieval towns included Oxford, which grew around its university (founded c. 1096), and Henley-on-Thames, a river trading town and was vital for transporting goods like grain, wool and timber. The valley became increasingly agricultural, with many villages producing crops for nearby towns and London. Thames towns developed industries like brewing, milling, and boat-building. Navigation improvements allowed larger boats to transport goods efficiently.

The Thames Valley was transformed by canals, railways and improved roads. Towns like Reading and Slough became industrial hubs. Agriculture became more mechanised, but some areas retained traditional farming.

The Thames Valley has evolved into a mix of urban and rural areas, with major towns like Reading, Maidenhead, and Oxford being centres of business, education and technology. The region is part of the "Silicon Valley" of the UK, with a strong presence of tech and research industries. The Thames continues to be used for leisure, transport and tourism.

== Geography ==
As a National Character Area, the Thames Valley is bounded to the west by Reading, fanning out roughly in a wedge shape towards the fringes of London. It contains 38 Sites of Special Scientific Interest and significant amounts of broadleaf forest, including Burnham Beeches, Windsor Great Park and Richmond Park.

== Governance ==
In December 2025, local councils in Oxfordshire, Berkshire and Swindon submitted an expression of interest in forming a Thames Valley mayoral strategic authority covering their combined areas. Buckinghamshire, which has a separate county devolution deal, and the City of Milton Keynes declined to join. Milton Keynes is intending to join a devolution bid with Bedfordshire.

== Economy ==
The Thames Valley is a technology hub centred around Reading, and stretching as far out as Swindon, Oxford and Slough. It is part of the M4 corridor.

== Tourism ==
As a tourist destination, the Thames Valley is close to the River Thames, running from the source to the M25 motorway. It is a popular boating destination.

== Policing ==
Thames Valley Police cover the counties of Berkshire, Buckinghamshire and Oxfordshire. The force is governed by the Thames Valley Police and Crime Commissioner.

== See also ==
- Diocese of Oxford – Diocese of the Church of England
- South Midlands – Region of England
- Three Counties (Gloucestershire, Herefordshire and Worcestershire) – Area of England
