= Robert David Steele =

American CIA officer and conspiracy theorist (1952–2021)

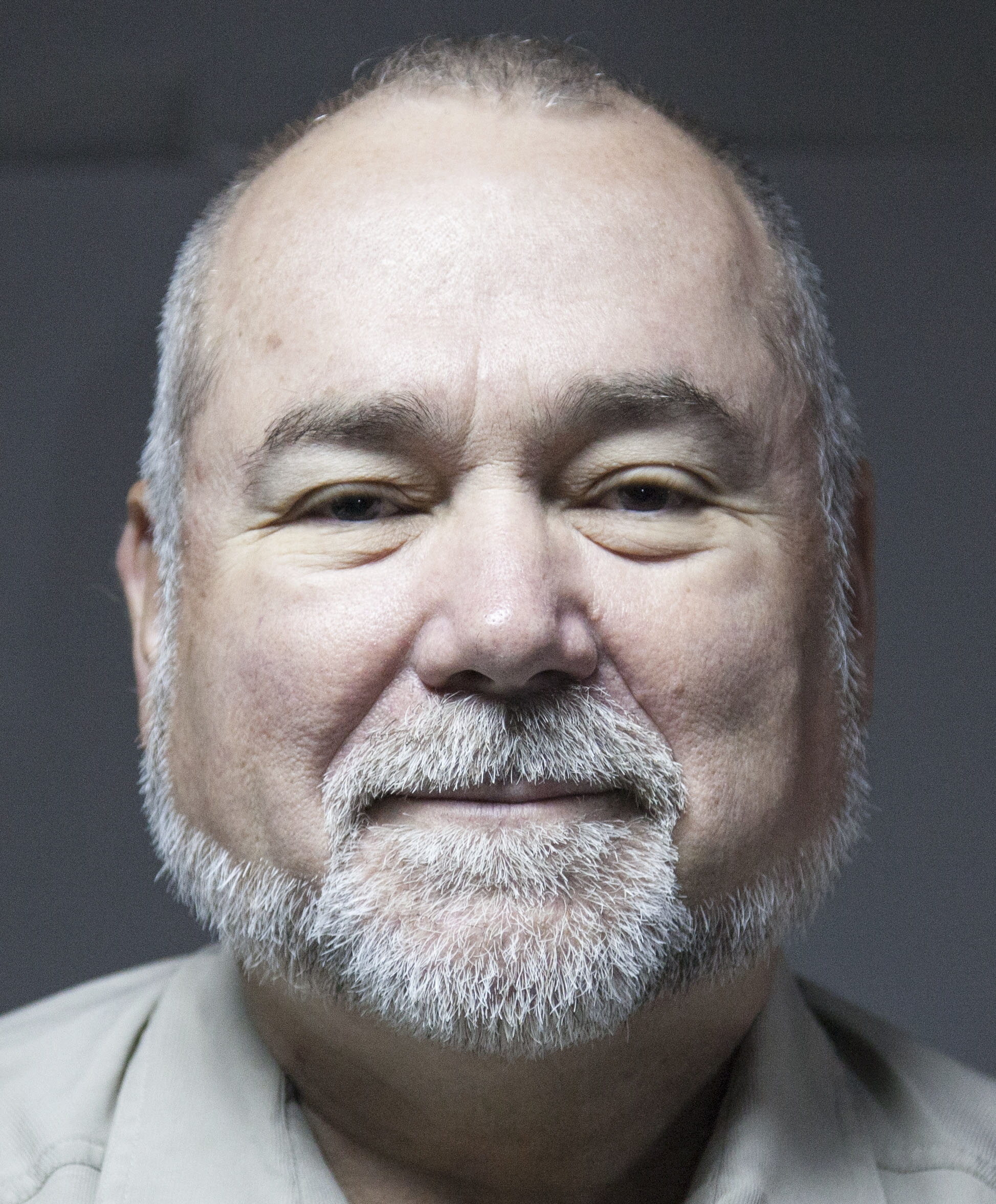
- Steele in 2013
- Born: July 16, 1952; New York City, U.S.
- Died: August 29, 2021 (aged 69); Florida, U.S.

Robert David Steele (July 16, 1952 – August 29, 2021) was an American case officer for the Central Intelligence Agency, co-founder of the United States Marine Corps Intelligence Activity and conspiracy theorist.

== Early life and career ==
Steele's father was an executive for an oil company, and Steele therefore spent the first twenty years of his life in Asia and Latin America. He held a Bachelor of Arts in political science, a master's degree in international relations, and an Advanced Management Program in public administration. He worked at the United States's embassy in El Salvador during the Salvadoran Civil War as a political officer. He then researched artificial intelligence and cognitive strategy.

Steele is credited with coining the terms "virtual intelligence" and "peacekeeping information". He called for intelligence reforms in the United States and advocated for the private sector to develop and sell such intelligence to the central government. He was a supporter of open-source intelligence and argued that the CIA refused to take open-source information seriously and should not be responsible for developing new systems that ran contrary to its history of secrecy.

== Conspiracy theories ==
While touring his 2014 'Open Source Everything Manifesto', Steele said "I personally think that pedophilia is going to be the straw that breaks the camel's back ... the U.S. public is in massive denial of how corrupt its elites are. Pedophilia is considered an elite privilege."

Steele was a regular guest on Alex Jones's radio show. In an interview by Jones in June 2017, Steele claimed NASA holds a colony on Mars populated by human slaves who were kidnapped as children and sent to the planet. NASA spokesperson, feeling the need to respond about numerous false rumors, said "There are no humans on Mars" and that “there’s only one stupid rumor on the Internet? Now that’s news."

On his Public Intelligence Blog, Steele cited The Protocols of the Elders of Zion at least 42 times to expound on the "Zionist conspiracy". He stated in a September 2019 blog entry that Jews in financial sectors were "a secret society" that "believes [itself] to be exempt from all laws and customs", leading to accusations of antisemitism, and called for the incarceration of Jews who were insufficiently loyal to the republic. He described the Holocaust as being a "contrived myth" and Zionism as “a cancer on humanity” urging the eradication of "every Zionist who refuses to be loyal to their country of citizenship and the rule of law.”

In September 2020, he implied "two Zionists", one of whom was Yitzhak Rabin, were in Dallas and somehow involved in the assassination of John F. Kennedy. Additionally, he claimed Rabin and Dick Cheney agreed on a proposal for the September 11 attacks: "The Zionists installed the controlled demolitions that assisted what I believe was clearly a directed energy controlled frequency event in the twin towers, controlled demolitions alone for WTC seven, and a massive coverup was executed….9/11 [legal] cases did not go to trial; controlled Zionist judges and prosecutors ensured that all cases were generously settled".

Steele was the organizer of the Arise USA tour, a three-month tour of all 50 American states. The Daily Beast reported the tour began in May 2021. Steele promoted Donald Trump's false claims of fraud in the 2020 presidential election and told his audiences of "the treason and high crimes represented by the fake pandemic, unconstitutional lockdown, mask idiocy, and the deaths and sterilization and mutations associated with the untested toxic 'vaccines'". The tour featured speakers such as Oath Keeper Richard Mack and conspiracy theory promoter Sacha Stone. In July 2021, he held a demonstration in Belfast, Maine to claim that the 2020 presidential election was rigged and called COVID-19 a hoax. He claimed to be the first person to call COVID-19 a hoax. The tour concluded in August 2021, following allegations that $300,000 had been stolen from the tour's budget. He also promoted the QAnon conspiracy theory.

== Death ==
Steele died from COVID-19 in Florida on August 29, 2021, at the age of 69. Friend and fellow conspiracy theorist Mark Tassi, who confirmed Steele's death, claimed that his health had deteriorated after being given treatment in hospital for COVID-19. Before his admission to hospital, Steele had promoted an anti-vaccination campaign.

== Publications ==
- On Intelligence: Spies and Secrecy in an Open World (2000)
- The New Craft of Intelligence: Personal, Public, & Political (2002)
- Peacekeeping Intelligence: Emerging Concepts for the Future (2003)
- Information Operations: All Information, All Languages, All the Time (2005)
- The Smart Nation Act: Public Intelligence in the Public Interest (2006)
- The Open-Source Everything Manifesto: Transparency, Truth, and Trust (2012)
- Intelligence For Earth: Clarity, Diversity, Integrity, & Sustainability (2015)

== Filmography ==
- American Drug War: The Last White Hope (2007)
