= 5GBioShield =

Fraudulent alternative medicine device

Bauer 5GBioShield
- Type: Scam
- Inventor: Jacques Bauer; Ilija Lakicevic
- Inception: 2020
- Manufacturer: BioShield Distribution
- Available: No longer available
- Current supplier: BioShield Distribution
- Last production year: 2022

The Bauer 5GBioShield, usually shortened to 5GBioShield, is a fraudulent device which was claimed to protect against radiation from 5G mobile networks. The device was invented by clinical pharmacist Jacques Bauer and former scientist Ilija Lakicevic and marketed by alternative medicine activist Sacha Stone. The product, which was sold for approximately £330 through an affiliate marketing scheme, was found to be composed of a normal USB thumb drive and a sticker. As of April 26, 2022, the official website is no longer online. British Trading Standards officials determined that the device was a scam.

== Description ==
The manufacturers claim that:

"Through a process of quantum oscillation the 5G BioShield USB Key balances and reharmonizes the disturbing frequencies arising from the electric fog induced by devices, such as laptops, cordless phones, wifi, tablets, etc."

The device is simply a common USB thumb drive containing marketing documents and usage instructions. The USB device is housed in a clear perspex block imprinted with a stylized version of St George slaying a dragon, as based on a medal originally made by William Wyon for Albert, Prince Consort.

Lakicevic, the co-inventor of the product, describes the device as containing a "new energy" embedded in a sticker, and that the USB stick is merely a carrier and need not be powered on to work. Lakicevic's claims regarding this product were published in an issue of the International Journal of Science and Research (ITNJ), a pay-to-publish science journal with no peer review processes in place.

== Reception ==
The device was recommended in a report published by Glastonbury Town Council. Town councillor Toby R. Hall stated that the device could be "helpful" and "provide protection" due to a "wearable holographic nano-layer catalyser".

An analysis by Pen Test Partners, however, concluded that this device was nothing more than a 128 megabyte capacity generic USB thumb drive. The security firm concluded that the device "should [not] be promoted by publicly-funded bodies".

Following this report, the device was investigated by Trading Standards and found to be a scam and the matter had been referred to City of London Police Fraud Squad.
