= Anthony Stansfeld =

British politician and Police and Crime Commissioner (b.1945)

Thames Valley Police and Crime Commissioner
- In office 22 November 2012 – 12 May 2021
- Preceded by: Office created
- Succeeded by: Matthew Barber

Councillor for Kintbury Ward West Berkshire Council
- In office 2003–2008

Personal details
- Born: 14 October 1945 (age 81)
- Party: Conservative
- Profession: Defence and Aviation Exports
- Military career
- Allegiance: United Kingdom
- Branch: British Army
- Units: Royal Green Jackets; Territorial Army
- Conflicts: Falklands War

Anthony Hamer Rennie Stansfeld (/ˈstænsfiːld/ STANSS-feeld; born 14 October 1945) is a British Conservative Party politician who was the first Thames Valley Police and Crime Commissioner (2012–21).

== Career ==
Stansfeld has had a career in both the military and in industry. He enlisted in the Army at 17 and joined the Royal Green Jackets where he saw active service in Borneo and Northern Ireland. He learnt to fly helicopters at Middle Wallop and commanded various Army Air Corps Squadrons, including the Army helicopters in the Falkland Islands in the latter half of 1982. He spent two years as Chief of Staff Intelligence in the Far East. While in the Army he spent 4 months carrying out the reconnaissance for the crossing of the Darién Gap in Panama and Colombia, and led the first stage of Operation Raleigh, taking young people through the jungles of Honduras and Belize.

On leaving the Army he was marketing director, and then, for 6 years, managing director of the aircraft company Pilatus Britten Norman. At the same time he commanded the Army reserve helicopters as a Territorial Army officer. He has an MSc and studied international terrorism and global security at university.

== Political career ==
Stansfeld was elected to West Berkshire Council as a Councillor in 2003 representing Kintbury Ward, having previously served on Kintbury Parish Council. He was a Trustee of the Thames Valley Air Ambulance for 8 years.

From 2008 to 2012 he was appointed to Thames Valley Police Authority (becoming Chairman of the Performance Committee in 2011). He was the first person to serve as the Thames Valley Police and Crime Commissioner, being elected on 15 November 2012. In 2019, he was reported to have intervened in a case with which Thames Valley Police were not involved, on behalf of a fellow member of the International Tribunal for Natural Justice (ITNJ). This was the subject of a misconduct hearing and he was found, by the police force's complaints panel, to have acted outside his remit and he did not seek re-election. At a 2019 event organised by Sacha Stone (founder of the ITNJ), Stansfeld was a guest speaker. He said "The implications of microwave radiation has increased exponentially and will continue to do so, and it does seriously need some very open scientific study to prove that it is safe and I don’t think we’ve got that at the moment."
