= Sacha Stone =

British New Age conspiracy theorist

- Born: Simon Jean Paul Sacha Adams; 1966 (age 59–60); Rhodesia
- Citizenship: United Kingdom
- Movement: New Age conspiracism

Simon Jean Paul Sasha Adams (born 1966), known as Sacha Stone, is a Rhodesian/Zimbabwean-British New Age influencer and conspiracy theorist. He is marketing 5GBioShield, an fake anti-radiation protection device. He is also known for founding The International Tribunal for Natural Justice, The New Earth Project and the New Earth Festival which he hosts at his private resort, Akasha New Earth Haven, in Ubud, Bali.

== Early life ==
Stone was born in Rhodesia. In the late 1990s, he was the lead vocalist in the eponymously titled band Stone, which released one album, Cover The Sun, but did not achieve commercial success.

== Activism ==
=== NewEarthProject ===
Stone launched the NewEarth Project, promoting "conscious living", in 2013. This led to the NewEarth Festival, launched in 2017, attended by 2,000.

=== International Tribunal for Natural Justice ===
In 2015, Stone founded ITNJ (The International Tribunal For Natural Justice), an organisation which stages court-like hearings dedicated to applying the principle of "natural law" to matters of current affairs. ITNJ has featured discredited individuals who have subsequently used it as a forum for making claims that have been deemed to be false or misleading statements.

ITNJ hearings are chaired by Sir [sic] John Walsh of Brannagh, a lawyer disbarred from his practice in Victoria, Australia, who is a former chancellor of Greenwich University, an unaccredited university formerly of Norfolk Island, Victoria.

Robert O. Young, an American naturopath, who was jailed for illegally practising medicine, claimed in a November 2019 ITNJ video that "Mandating vaccines is part of depopulation plan". In a widely circulated clip, Young makes unsubstantiated claims that Bill Gates wants to kill three billion people, that international health agencies are "using chemical warfare against all of us", that viruses are not real, that vaccines are poison, and that alkaline can be used to cure any ailment. The video went viral on social media. Its claims were dismissed as false by numerous factcheck organisations.

The ITNJ organised a hearing on child trafficking, with "chief counsel" Robert David Steele, a former CIA-agent. His opening speech supported the Pizzagate conspiracy theory and suggested that Hillary Clinton's 2016 US presidential campaign team were Satanic paedophiles.

Since 2020, ITNJ has spread conspiracy theories about the COVID-19 pandemic, including claims that 5G technology helps the coronavirus spread. On 10 May 2020, ITNJ hosted a hearing which included testimony from discredited former doctor Andrew Wakefield and Sherri Tenpenny, an American anti-vaccination activist.

=== Arise USA Tour ===
Stone was a guest speaker in Robert David Steele's Arise USA tour. He used this as a platform to alert his audience to a "wave of unprecedented evil" which he believed to be taking over America.

== Views ==
=== Antisemitism ===
Stone posits that humanity is ruled by elite "Hidden Masters", which he refers to as "the Illuminati", "the Babylonian blood-cult", the "Luciferians", and the "Sabbateans":

Our holonomic reality can realistically be defined as a culture underpinned by generational satanism, ritual sacrifice, blood-economics and arch deception perpetrated by approximately 1 out of 10 people against an unwitting 9 out of 10. That is if any reasonable statistical analysis of contemporary satanism holds true.

Stone blamed the world's current woes on "Sabbatian Zionist Lurian Kabbalists behind the veil," a formulation referring to followers of the 16th century Kabbalist Rabbi Isaac Luria and the 17th century mystic Shabtai Tzvi.

=== Anti-vaccine claims ===
At the 2019 NewEarth Festival, curated by Stone in Bali, invited speakers included anti-vaccine activist Del Bigtree and US conspiracy theory author G. Edward Griffin.

Stone has stated that the COVID-19 vaccine is a conspiracy to implant a "nanochip" in the human body so that "the Beast" can "take control of their soul." Stone has stated that use of vaccines is misguided: "Anyone who rolls their sleeve up for a vaccine – or an RFID nanochip – is absolutely inviting the Beast to take control of their soul".

On 5 January 2021, Stone hosted an event titled "Focus on Fauci" with anti-vaccine activists Judy Mikovits, a discredited biochemist, and Robert F. Kennedy Jr., an American lawyer known for promoting skeptical views on vaccines and radio-communication systems.

=== Claims about 5G ===
Stone has promoted the claim that 5G is associated with health risks. He produced 5G Apocalypse: The Extinction Event, an hour-long documentary film promoting the idea that 5G telephone networks are a military weapon disguised as a telephone system. The documentary introduced Mark Steele, whose claims comprise the bulk of its content. The hour-long documentary had over a million views before being removed from YouTube.

At the documentary's launch, Stone sold access to the film for $10, which included a 10% discount on the Bauer 5GBioShield, a USB-stick which Stone marketed as being able to protect users from the harmful effects of 5G radiation. The USB stick was sold by Stone through an affiliate marketing network, but was later considered to be a scam by Trading Standards.

=== NewEarth Tenasi project in Tennessee ===
In 2025, Stone's organisation NewEarth Nation purchased around 60 acres of land in Stanley Valley, Hawkins County, Tennessee, for what was described as a "micronation" or intentional religious community called NewEarth Tenasi. The plans drew significant local opposition after residents raised concerns about connections to the sovereign citizen movement, as well as fears about cult-like behaviour and the potential erosion of local governance.

Through May and June 2025, multiple public meetings and forums were held between Hawkins County residents and NewEarth leaders, including Sacha Stone himself. Citizens voiced worries about sovereignty claims, lack of transparency, and safety. NewEarth representatives denied extremist intent, framing the project as a spiritual sanctuary.

Some neighbours organised daily prayer meetings opposing the project in the run-up to its planned consecration. Despite the pushback, NewEarth Tenasi held its first ceremony on 21 June 2025.
