= Thames Valley Police and Crime Commissioner =

Elected official in England

- Incumbent; Matthew Barber since 13 May 2021
- Police and crime commissioner of Thames Valley Police
- Reports to: Thames Valley Police and Crime Panel
- Appointer: Electorate of Berkshire, Buckinghamshire and Oxfordshire
- Term length: Four years
- Constituting instrument: Police Reform and Social Responsibility Act 2011
- Precursor: Thames Valley Police Authority
- Inaugural holder: Anthony Stansfeld
- Formation: 22 November 2012
- Deputy: Deputy Police and Crime Commissioner
- Salary: £88,600
- Website: www.thamesvalley-pcc.gov.uk

The Thames Valley Police and Crime Commissioner (PCC) is a police and crime commissioner, an elected official tasked with setting out the way crime is tackled by Thames Valley Police in the ceremonial English counties of Berkshire, Buckinghamshire and Oxfordshire. The post was created in November 2012, following an election held on 15 November 2012, and replaced the Thames Valley Police Authority. The current incumbent is Matthew Barber, who represents the Conservative Party.

== List of Thames Valley Police and Crime Commissioners ==
Name	Political party	From	To
Anthony Stansfeld	Conservative	22 November 2012	12 May 2021
Matthew Barber	Conservative	13 May 2021	Incumbent

== Elections ==
Elections for the role of Thames Valley Police and Crime Commissioner took place in 2012, 2016, 2021 and 2024. The PCC was elected by a supplementary vote system with a term of four years; however, elections scheduled for 2020 were postponed until 2021 due to the COVID-19 pandemic.

Since May 2023 the voting system was changed to the first past the post system meaning the 2 May 2024 PCC elections were held under the changed system.

=== 2024 ===
Matthew Barber was re-elected on 2 May 2024 with a majority of 2,343. The count for the election was undertaken by West Berkshire Council and the result announced on 4 May 2024 at Newbury Racecourse.

==== Results ====
Thames Valley Police and Crime Commissioner 2 May 2024
Party	Candidate	Votes	%	±%
Conservative	Matthew Barber	144,092	32.1	
Labour Co-op	Tim Starkey	141,749	31.6	
Liberal Democrats	Tim Bearder	84,341	18.8	
More Police Officers for Thames Valley	Ben Holden-Crowther	46,853	10.4	
Independent	Russel Fowler	31,460	7.0	
Turnout		448,495	24.4	
Rejected ballots		7,207		
Total votes		455,718	24.8	
Registered electors		1,835,463		
Conservative hold		Swing		

=== 2021 ===
Voters in the Thames Valley Police Area voted for their next PCC on Thursday 6 May 2021, on the same day as local elections were held across the United Kingdom. Votes were counted in 13 locations in the Thames Valley area on Monday 10 May 2021 including at Spiceball Leisure Centre in Banbury, where the results were announced.

==== Results ====
Thames Valley Police and Crime Commissioner 6 May 2021
Party	Candidate	1st round		2nd round			1st round votesTransfer votes, 2nd round
Party	Candidate	Total	Of round	Transfers	Total	Of round	1st round votesTransfer votes, 2nd round
Conservative	Matthew Barber	267,404	42.46%	45,744	313,148	57.29%	
Labour	Laetisia Carter	175,123	27.81%	58,323	233,446	42.71%	
Liberal Democrats	John Howson	110,072	17.48%				
Independent	Alan Robinson	77,210	12.26%				
Turnout		629,809					

=== 2016 ===
In 2016, Anthony Stansfeld was re-elected for a second term as Thames Valley PCC.

==== Results ====
Thames Valley Police and Crime Commissioner 5 May 2016
Party	Candidate	1st round		2nd round			1st round votesTransfer votes, 2nd round
Party	Candidate	Total	Of round	Transfers	Total	Of round	1st round votesTransfer votes, 2nd round
Conservative	Anthony Stansfeld	164,554	39.93%	37,842	202,396	53.96%	
Labour	Laetisia Carter	138,084	33.50%	34,633	172,717	46.04%	
Liberal Democrats	John Howson	59,575	14.45%				
UKIP	Lea Trainer	49,942	12.12%				
Turnout		412,155					

=== 2012 ===
In 2012, Anthony Stansfeld was elected as the first PCC for the Thames Valley Police Area.

==== Results ====
Thames Valley Police and Crime Commissioner 15 November 2012
Party	Candidate	1st round		2nd round			1st round votesTransfer votes, 2nd round
Party	Candidate	Total	Of round	Transfers	Total	Of round	1st round votesTransfer votes, 2nd round
Conservative	Anthony Stansfeld	76,011	34.70%	18,227	94,238	57.24%	
Labour	Tim Starkey	56,631	25.85%	13,772	70,403	42.76%	
Independent	Geoff Howard	31,716	14.48%				
UKIP	Barry Cooper	19,324	8.82%				
Independent	Patience Awe	14,878	6.79%				
Turnout		219,071					
